= Antonie Lilienfeld-Schulz =

Antonie Lilienfeld-Schulz (1876–1972) was a Polish art collector who specialized in Dutch and Flemish painters, including works by Frans Hals, Gerard Dou, Jan Steen, and Salomon van Ruysdael. She lived in Vienna with her husband. Several paintings from her collection were selected during World War II for the planned Führermuseum in Linz, but were returned to her after the war.

== Biography ==
Schulz was born in 1876 in what is now the Czech Republic. In 1914, she married Joseph Leib Leon Lilienfeld, a wealthy patent holder for various types of cellulose. The couple lived in Vienna but retained their Polish citizenship.

Leon Lilienfeld owned a significant collection of paintings. In early 1938, shortly after the Anschluss of Austria into the Third Reich, Schulz and Lilienfeld moved to Milan. Lilienfeld died of pneumonia on 6 June 1938, leaving Schulz as his sole heir.

Schulz left faschist Italy for Switzerland, while her lawyer, Emmerich Hunne, managed her affairs in Vienna. Following the Anschluss and the rise of anti-Jewish persecution under the Nazi regime, Schulz—whose late husband had been Jewish—was placed under close scrutiny by the authorities.

She managed to convince the National Socialist administration that her art collection, which remained in Vienna, was her personal property, and thus not Jewish. In 1939, she applied for permission to export her collection of about 145 paintings. Of these, eight works were confiscated on the grounds that they were too valuable to leave the Third Reich. Hermann Voss selected them for the planned Führermuseum in Linz.

The eight paintings were: "Portrait of a Man by Frans Hals, Vanitas by Gerard Dou, The Duet by Jacob Ochtervelt, Flowers in a Vase with Butterflies by Johan Baptist Drechsler, River Landscape by Salomon van Ruysdael, A Garden Arbor by an Inn by Jan Steen, A Family Group by Hendrik Martenszoon Sorgh, and Interior of a Peasant Cottage by David Teniers II. The authorities sought to coerce Schulz into selling these works to the Nazi-controlled art institutions.

In February 1940, Schulz emigrated to Montreal via New York, while her lawyer, Emmerich Hunne, continued corresponding with the National Socialist authorities regarding her paintings. By 1941, she had settled permanently in Winchester, Massachusetts, where she lived until her death in 1972.

During this period, Schulz grew increasingly concerned about the eight paintings left behind in Vienna, but she received no further communication from Hunne or any news about the works until the end of the war.

In 1945, all eight paintings were recovered. After considerable difficulties, the Frans Hals and Gerard Dou works arrived in the United States in 1948. They were received by the Museum of Fine Arts (MFA), Boston, with which Schulz had by then established a close relationship.

The remaining six paintings—with the exception of the Drechsler—arrived at the MFA in 1949, while the Drechsler painting itself followed in 1951. In 1948, Schulz donated the Dou painting to the MFA, and in 1966, the Hals painting was also gifted to the museum.
