= Hans Posse =

German art historian and museum curator

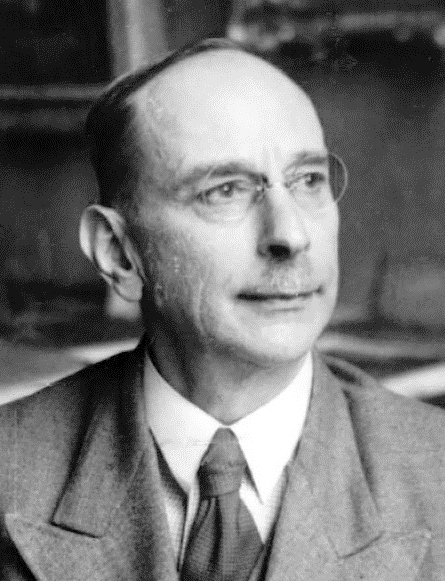
Hans Posse in 1938

Dr. Hans Posse (6 February 1879 – 7 December 1942) was a German art historian, museum curator, and, for over three years, from June 1939 until his death, the special representative of Adolf Hitler appointed to expand the collection of paintings and other art objects which Hitler intended for the so-called "Führermuseum" in Linz, Austria. The museum, which was never built, was to be the core of a cultural center which was part of a planned general rebuilding of the city intended to have it surpass Vienna and rival Budapest.

== Life and career ==
Posse was the son of Otto Adalbert Posse, an historian and archivist who was director of the Saxon Central State Archive in Dresden. The younger Posse studied art history, archaeology and history in Marburg and Vienna, and received his doctorate in 1903 in Vienna under Franz Wickhoff with a thesis on the 17th century Roman painter Andrea Sacchi.

Posse's museum career began that same year as a volunteer at the Kaiser Friedrich Museum in Berlin, where he soon became the assistant to and protégé of Wilhelm von Bode, the museum's director. Posse made a name for himself in the world of art history by his handling of the museum's collections of German, Dutch and English paintings; a two-volume inventory catalog was published in 1911.

He spent several years in Florence as an assistant at the city's German Institute of Art History, and in Rome as a researcher at the Bibliotheca Hertziana, which resulted in a work on the ceiling paintings of Pietro da Cortona. His later publications would investigate Lucas Cranach and the German Impressionist Robert Sterl.

In 1910, at age 31, thanks in large part to the efforts of Bode, Posse was appointed to be the director of the Dresden Picture Gallery, also known as the Gemäldegalerie Alte Meister ("Old Master's Gallery") or simply the "Dresden Gallery".

=== Dresden Gallery ===
Posse reorganized the museum along the new ideas of Bode, and built up its holdings of German paintings, primarily from the 19th century, paying particular attention to the Dresden Romantics.

Called up for military service in World War I, he wrote to Bode from the front lines in 1914 "I would be very happy to participate in the division of the Louvre."

After the war, from the summer of 1919, he began to add expressionist works to the museum. He was a significant supporter and friend of Oskar Kokoschka, the Austrian expressionist artist, poet and playwright, who was at the time a professor at the Dresden Academy of Fine Arts and become a lodger in Posse's apartment. When Posse put together the German contribution to the XIII Venice Biennale in 1922, he featured Kokschka's work. As curator of the Dresden International Art Exhibition 1926 and both the 1922 and 1930 Venice Biennales, Posse advocated for avant-garde works to be considered as a legitimate part of the German art world. This stance provoked bitter opposition from German nationalist artists, whose attacks he suffered from 1926 on.

In his speech on 12 June 1926 for the opening of the International Art Exhibition, Posse emphasized the international orientation of Dresden's contemporary art life, which was necessary for the artists of Dresden to remain relevant, and avoid the stagnation of provincialism and possible extinction. He also pointed out the strategic importance of the Exhibition as a window to the international world of art, especially after the isolation of the war years.

In 1931 Posse founded the New Masters Gallery on Brühl's Terrace in Dresden, which was based on the Dresden Gallery's "Modern Department" collection of 19th and 20th century paintings, including Romantics, Expressionists and Impressionist works.

=== Relationship with the Nazis ===
Adolf Hitler's National Socialist German Worker's Party (NSDAP, commonly called the Nazi Party), had, following their leader's example, long taken a strong stance against all modern art styles, which it called "degenerate art" or "Bolshevik art". After Hitler was appointed Chancellor in January 1933 – the so-called "seizure of power" – the Nazi Party in Dresden launched a smear campaign against Posse, accusing him of displaying "degenerate art" in the museum, and claiming, inaccurately, that he was partly Jewish. At least one of his attackers, Walter Gasch, was motivated by a desire for Posse's job. Posse was nevertheless able to keep his position, at least temporarily, by distancing himself from the Modernist works he had previously championed. He argued that of the 310 works added to the collection under his leadership, only 33 were dated after 1910, that many of those were gifts and on loan, and he had received them only in the spirit of helping local artists. At about the same time, Posse – whose housekeeper and future wife had joined the Nazi Party in 1931 – applied to become a party member, and received his interim membership card in December 1933. His opponents, however, prevented him from becoming a full member; he remained a provisional member of the Party until June 1934, when his membership was finally rejected.

In December 1937, the Nazi campaign resulted in the confiscation and sale of 56 paintings from the New Masters Gallery, including works by Edvard Munch, Max Beckmann and Emil Nolde, and on 7 March 1938 Posse was summoned to answer for having hung these paintings. It was suggested that he retire, but he refused and took a leave of absence instead. Nevertheless, he was fired, only to be rehabilitated by Hitler, probably through the influence of art dealer Karl Haberstock, who often sold paintings to Hitler, as well as to Posse for the Dresden Gallery. Hitler visited Dresden on 18 June 1938, and questioned Posse about his dismissal. He asked for and examined the documents connected with the firing, and made the decision that Posse should get his position back. He and Martin Bormann were led through the museum by Posse.

=== Hitler's Special Envoy ===
A year later, on 20 June 1939, Hitler summoned Posse to his summer home, the Berghof, and told him that he wanted Posse to be the head of what would be perhaps the most massive art acquisition project in history, the gathering of paintings and other art works for Hitler's planned art museum in Linz, Austria, the city Hitler considered to be his hometown. What came to be called the "Führermuseum" – which was never built – was to be the core of a cultural center which was part of a general rebuilding of the city intended to have it surpass Vienna and rival Budapest. Posse's job would be to supplement Hitler's own previously purchased collection of mostly 19th century Germanic Romantic paintings. According to Posse's diary, Hitler told him that the museum would contain "only the best of all periods from the prehistoric beginnings of art ... to the nineteenth century and recent time," and the works were to be obtained both by purchase and by confiscation. "You are ... to deal only with me. I shall make the decisions," Posse was told.

The next day, Hitler set up the Sonderauftrag Linz ("Special Commission: Linz") in Dresden and appointed Posse as his special envoy. A few days later, on 26 June, Hitler signed a letter intended to give Posse the authority he would need to do the job. He wrote:

I commission Dr. Hans Posse, Director of Dresden Gallery, to build up the new art museum for Linz Donau. All Party and State services are ordered to assist Dr. Posse in fulfillment of his mission.

Although Hitler had favored German and Austrian paintings from the 19th century, Posse's focus was on early German, Dutch, French, and Italian paintings.

The Sonderauftrag not only collected art for the Führermuseum, but also for other museums in the German Reich, especially in the eastern territories. The artworks would have been distributed to these museums after the war. The Sonderauftrag had approximately 20 specialists attached to it: "curators of paintings, prints, coins, and armor, a librarian, an architect, an administrator, photographers, and restorers." The sizable staff included Robert Oertel and Gottfried Reimer of the Dresden Gallery, Friedrich Wolffhardt, an SS officer, as curator of books and autographs; Leopold Rupprecht of the Kunsthistorisches Museum as curator for armour, and Fritz Dworschak, also of that museum, as curator for coins.

=== Collecting for Linz ===
Immediately following the Nazi Anschluss with Austria " thousands of paintings were quickly seized following a general ban on Jewish art dealers and gallery owners. With many fleeing abroad, their holdings were ruthlessly liquidated and "Aryanized." On July 10, 1939, Posse visited the Austrian central depot of artworks confiscated from Jewish art collections, noting in his travel diary "Over 8000 pieces".

In the late summer and autumn of 1939, Posse traveled a number of times to Vienna to the Central Depot for confiscated art in the Neue Burg to pick out art pieces for the Linz museum, and in October he gave to Martin Bormann, for Hitler's approval, the list of artworks confiscated from the Vienna Rothschilds which Posse had selected for the museum. These included works by Hans Holbein the Elder, van Dyck, Rembrandt, Frans Hals, Tintoretto, Gerard ter Borch and Francesco Guardi, among others. These 182 pieces were included in Posse's July 1940 list of 324 paintings he had chosen for the museum's collection.

Other works which Hans Posse purchased in Vienna for the Linz collection included Rembrandt's The Artist in his Studio, Titian's The Toilet of Venus, Antonio Canova's Polyhymnia, and several works by Rembrandt. Among the many paintings Haberstock sold to the collection were two Rembrandts, one of which, Portrait of Hendrickje Stoffels is now thought to be from the Rembrandt workshop and not a work of the master. Oddly, Hitler purchased these for an inflated price, despite the fact that the seller was a partly Jewish woman and the paintings could have been confiscated. Posse also purchased over 200 pieces which Jewish owners fleeing Nazi Germany had managed to get into Switzerland. On the other hand, Posse also acquired confiscated or looted art in Czechoslovakia, Poland and the Netherlands. Posse commission Erhard Göpel to explore the Dutch art market.

Posse also went to Poland to examine confiscated artworks there, selecting works by Leonardo, Raphael, and Rembrandt for the museum in Linz, although these pieces never actually left the control of the General Government, the rump of Poland left after Nazi Germany and the Soviet Union took the territory they wanted.

On 10 June 1940, Posse wrote to Bormann:

The special delegate for the safeguarding of art and cultural properties has just returned from Holland. He notified me today that there exists at the moment a particularly favorable opportunity to purchase valuable works of art from Dutch dealers and private owners in German currency. Even though a large number of important works have doubtless been removed recently from Holland, I believe that the trade still contains many objects which are desirable for the Führer's collection, and which may be acquired without foreign exchange.

As a result of this, accounts of about 500,000 Reichsmarks were opened in Paris and Rome for Posse's personal use, and, around July 1940, he expanded the scope of the Sonderauftrag Linz into Belgium and the Netherlands when he established an office in The Hague as Referent für Sonderfragen (Adviser on "Special Questions"). Posse was able to report to Bormann that as of March 1941 he had spent 8,522,348 Reichsmarks on artworks for the Führermuseum. He later bought most of the Mannheimer Collection in 1944, including Rembrandt's Jewish Doctor – assisted by the threat of confiscation from the Nazi government of Arthur Seyss-Inquart – with the remainder of the collection being purchased in the same manner in France later on. The collecting of the Sonderauftrag Linz includes many such cases of forced sale, using funds from sales of Hitler's book Mein Kampf and stamps showing his portrait. Members of the Sonderauftrag Linz made a considerable number of purchasing trips throughout Europe, acquiring a significant number of artworks, and also arranged purchases through art dealers.

When Posse went to France, he took Nazi art looter Karl Haberstock with him, and the dealer, working through 82 local agents, purchased 62 pieces for the Linz collection, including works by Rembrandt, Brueghel, Watteau and Rubens.

In the "authoritarian anarchy" and "administrative chaos" that was typical of the way the Third Reich operated, the Sonderauftrag Linz was not the only Nazi agency collecting art works. In France, as in many other countries in Europe, the office of Einsatzstab Reichsleiter Rosenberg (Special Purposes Reich Leader Rosenberg, ERR) was the primary agency. Hitler issued on 18 November 1940 a directive, a Führerbefehl similar to the ones he had issued for Poland and Austria, announcing his prerogative over all confiscated art in the occupied Western territories. Rosenberg thus became a formal procurement agent for the Führermuseum. This apparently brought about some internecine squabbling, as Posse had been given the authority to act on Hitler's behalf, and the German commanders of occupied countries were required to keep him regularly informed about their confiscations of artwork. Probably because of the interference of Hermann Göring – who was busy using the ERR to confiscate art for himself – Posse formally requested that the Reich Chancellery reiterate his power to act for the Führer. The result was a "general high-level directive" confirming Hitler's primacy through Posse, and a direction to Posse to review the ERR's inventory in regard to the needs of the planned museum in Linz.

S.A. Gruppenführer Prince Philipp of Hessen was a connoisseur of the arts and architecture and acted as Posse's principal agent in Italy, where he lived with his wife, a daughter of King Victor Emmanuel. A grandson of the German Emperor Frederick III, and a great-grandson of Queen Victoria, Philipp provided "a veneer of aristocratic elegance which facilitated important purchases from the Italian nobility." Philipp assisted Posse in purchasing 90 paintings from Italy, and bought several more for the Linz collection on his own account. Another dealer used by Hans Posse was Hildebrand Gurlitt, through whom he made expensive purchases of tapestries, paintings and drawings.

In October 1939, Hitler and Benito Mussolini had made an agreement that any Germanic artworks in public museums in the South Tyrol – a traditionally German-speaking area which had been given to Italy after the First World War in return for entering the war on the side of the Triple Entente – could be removed and returned to Germany, but when Posse attempted to do so, with the assistance of Heinrich Himmler's Ahnenerbe, the Italians managed to keep putting things off, and no repatriations ever took place.

=== Relationship with Hitler ===
Hitler was pleased with Posse's work – the curator became one of the few people whose artistic opinion Hitler respected – and in April 1940 awarded him the honorific title of "Professor", something the Führer did for many of his favorites in the arts, such as architects Albert Speer and Hermann Giesler; sculptors Arno Breker and Josef Thorak; and photographer Heinrich Hoffmann; among others.

=== Death ===
Posse died on 7 December 1942 of oral cancer in a clinic in Berlin. His funeral was a high state event to which Hitler invited the directors of all art museums in the Reich; Propaganda Minister Joseph Goebbels delivered the eulogy, although there was no mention made of the Linz Museum project, since it was a state secret. Posse had gathered more than 2500 art works for the Linz museum in the three years he was head of the Sonderauftrag Linz.

Posse's successor as Hitler's special envoy was the art historian and former director of the Kaiser Friedrich Museum, Hermann Voss.

== Nazi-looted art ==
Research is ongoing into the artworks looted from Jewish collectors during the Holocaust that Posse acquired. A research database listing the art destined for Hitler's Linz museum was published in 2008 by the German Historical Museum. The German Lost Art Foundation also lists artworks acquired by Hans Posse.

== See also ==
- Nazi plunder
- The Holocaust
- List of claims for restitution for Nazi-looted art
