= An Allegory of Truth and Time =

Painting by Annibale Carracci

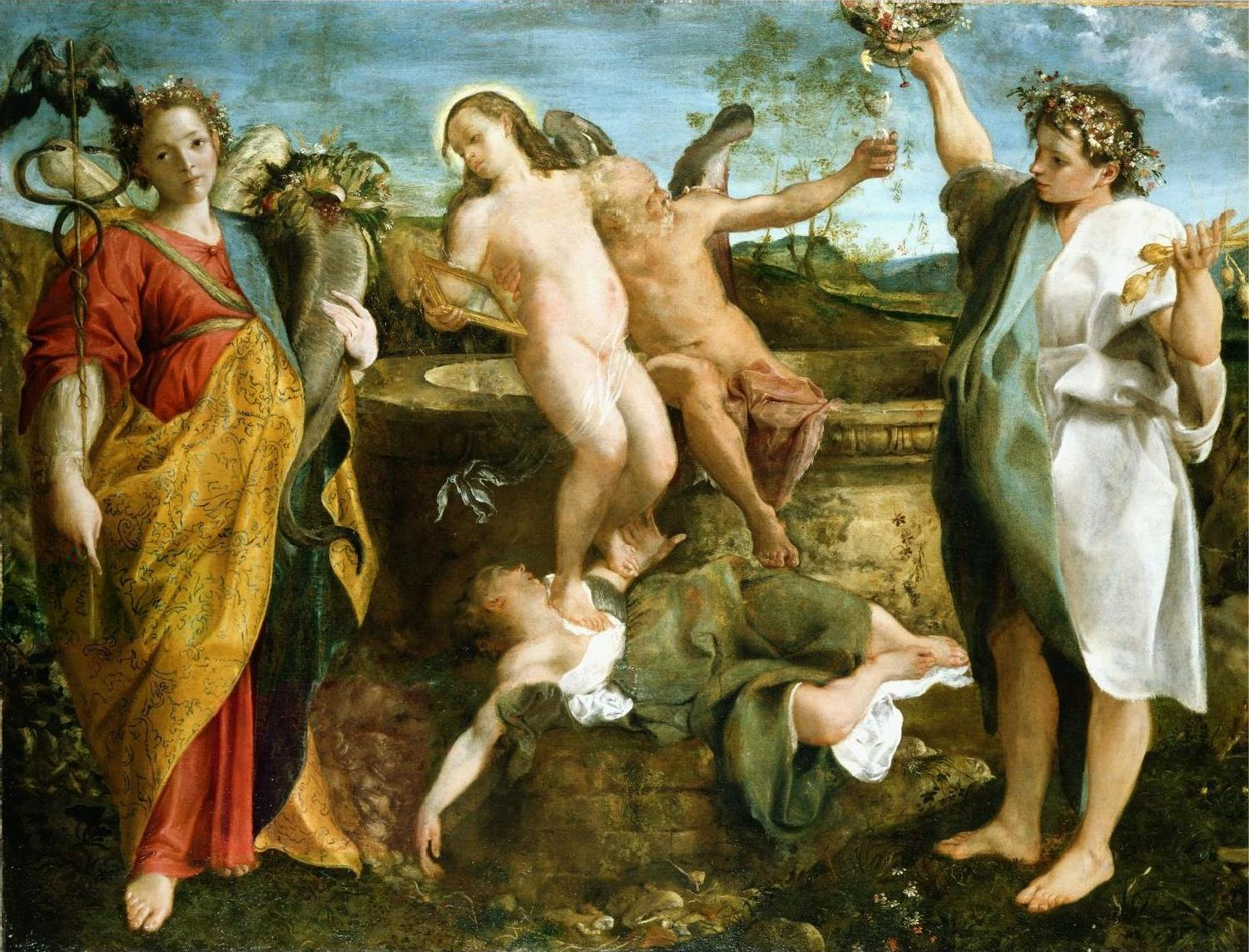
An Allegory of Truth and Time (1584–85) by Annibale Carracci

An Allegory of Truth and Time is a 1584–85 oil on canvas painting by the Italian Baroque master Annibale Carracci, now on display in Hampton Court as part of the Royal Collection.

It is not mentioned in any of the 17th-century biographical sources on Carracci's life and it is thought to have been in England by the early 18th century at the latest. The first definite reference to it dates to the mid 19th century, by which time it was in Queen Victoria's collection and thought to be by an unknown artist. Roberto Longhi and Hermann Voss assigned it its present attribution in the early 20th century.

Its style is very close to that of the artist's work on the Lives of Jason and Medea frescoes at the Palazzo Fava in Bologna, produced around 1584 with his relations Agostino Carracci and Ludovico Carracci. For this reason it is sometimes argued that the canvas was commissioned by that palazzo's owner, Filippo Fava. Its style and composition are both close to a drawing for a Judgement of Paris (Fogg Art Museum), argued by some art historians to have been produced by Carracci as a preparatory for a lost or never-executed painting.

== Iconography ==
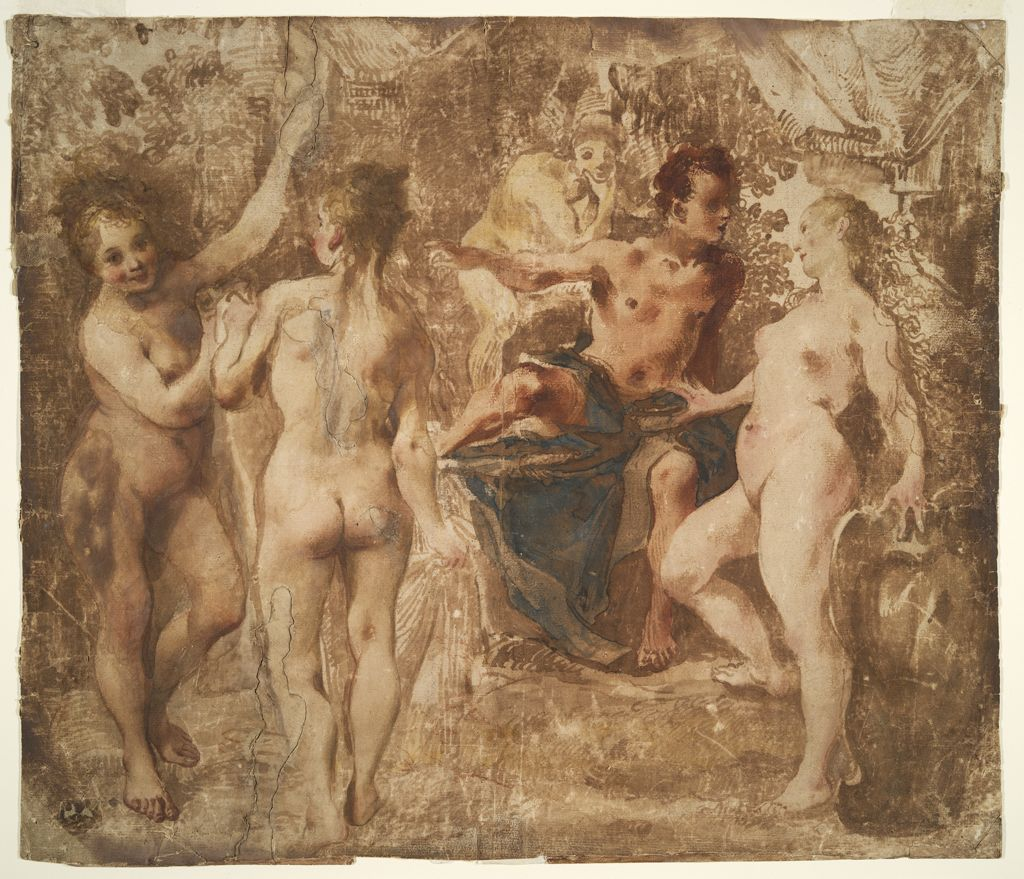
Annibale Carracci (attributed to), Judgement of Paris, 1584–1585, Fogg Art Museum, Cambridge (Massachusetts).

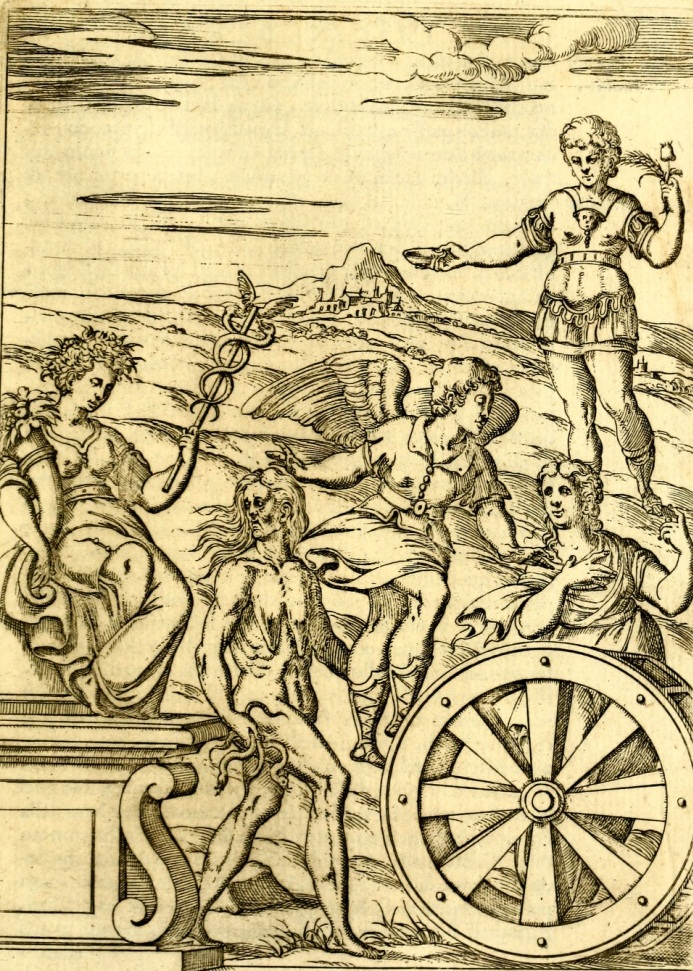
Bolognino Zaltieri, Good Fortune and other allegorical figures. Illustration from Le immagini de i dei antichi by Vincenzo Cartari

== Influences ==
One of the masterpieces of the painter's youth, it reflects his reaction to Correggio's style, a reaction which marked his paintings immediately after entering the art scene. Some argue that in this work that reaction is also filtered through the work of Federico Barocci.

== Gallery ==
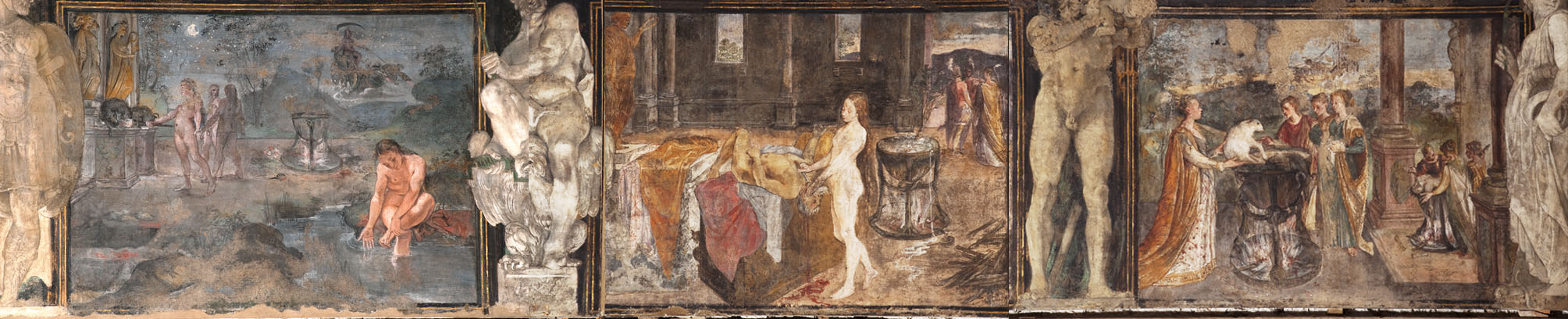
Annibale, Agostino and Ludovico Carracci, Lives of Jason and Medea, circa 1584, fresco, Palazzo Fava, Bologna

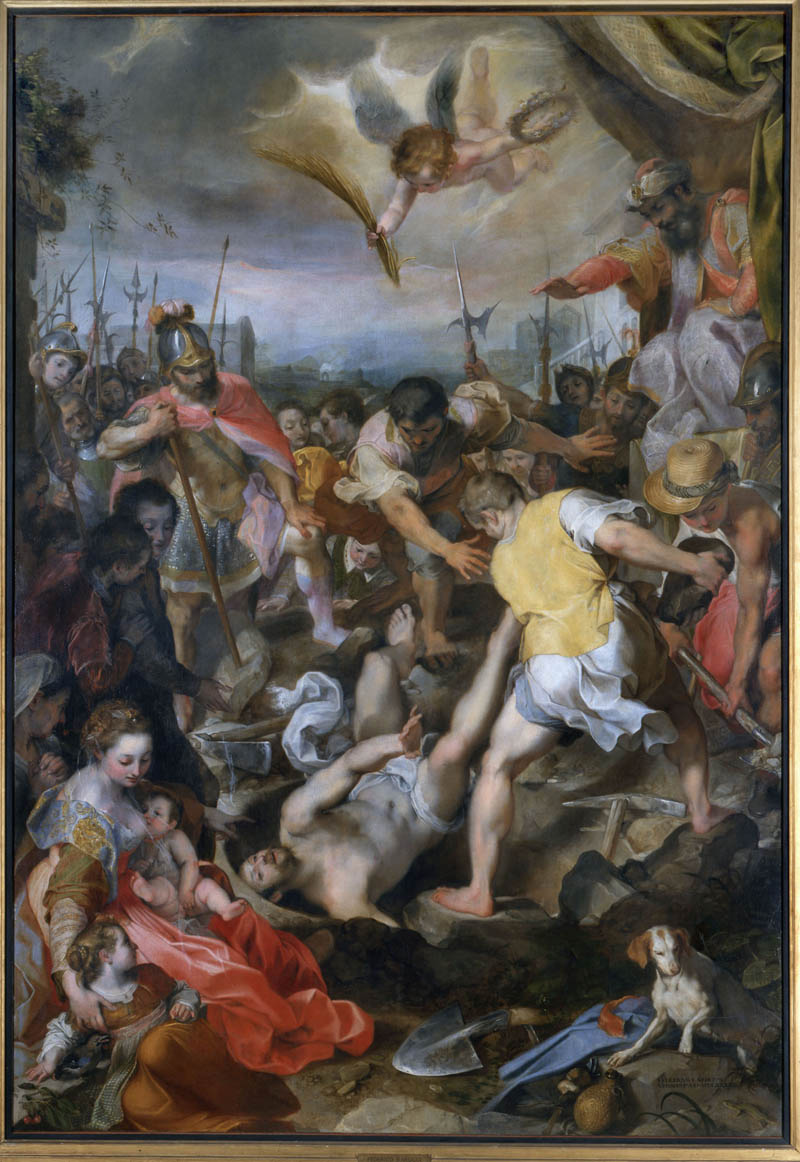
Federico Barocci, Martyrdom of Saint Vitalis, 1583, Pinacoteca di Brera, Milan

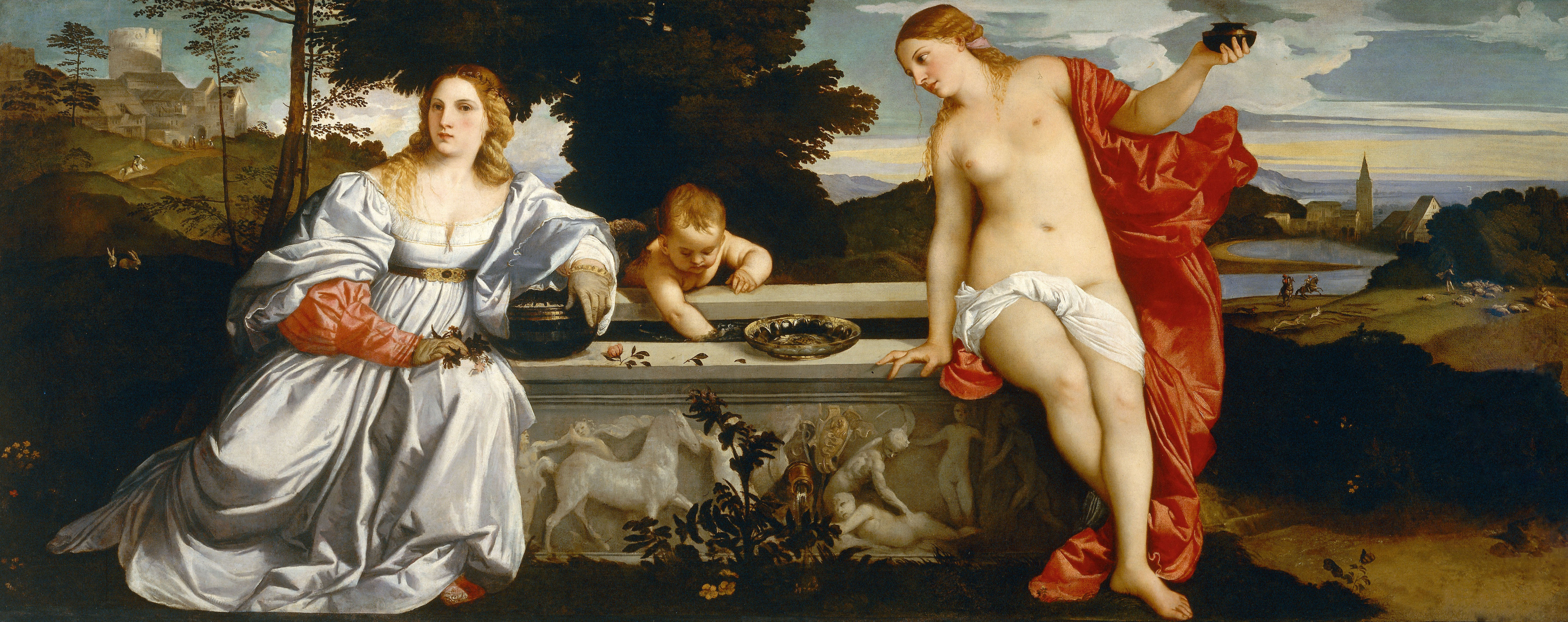
Titian, Sacred and Profane Love, circa 1515, Galleria Borghese, Rome
