= Erhard Göpel =

German art historian, Hitler's Linz agent (1906–1966)

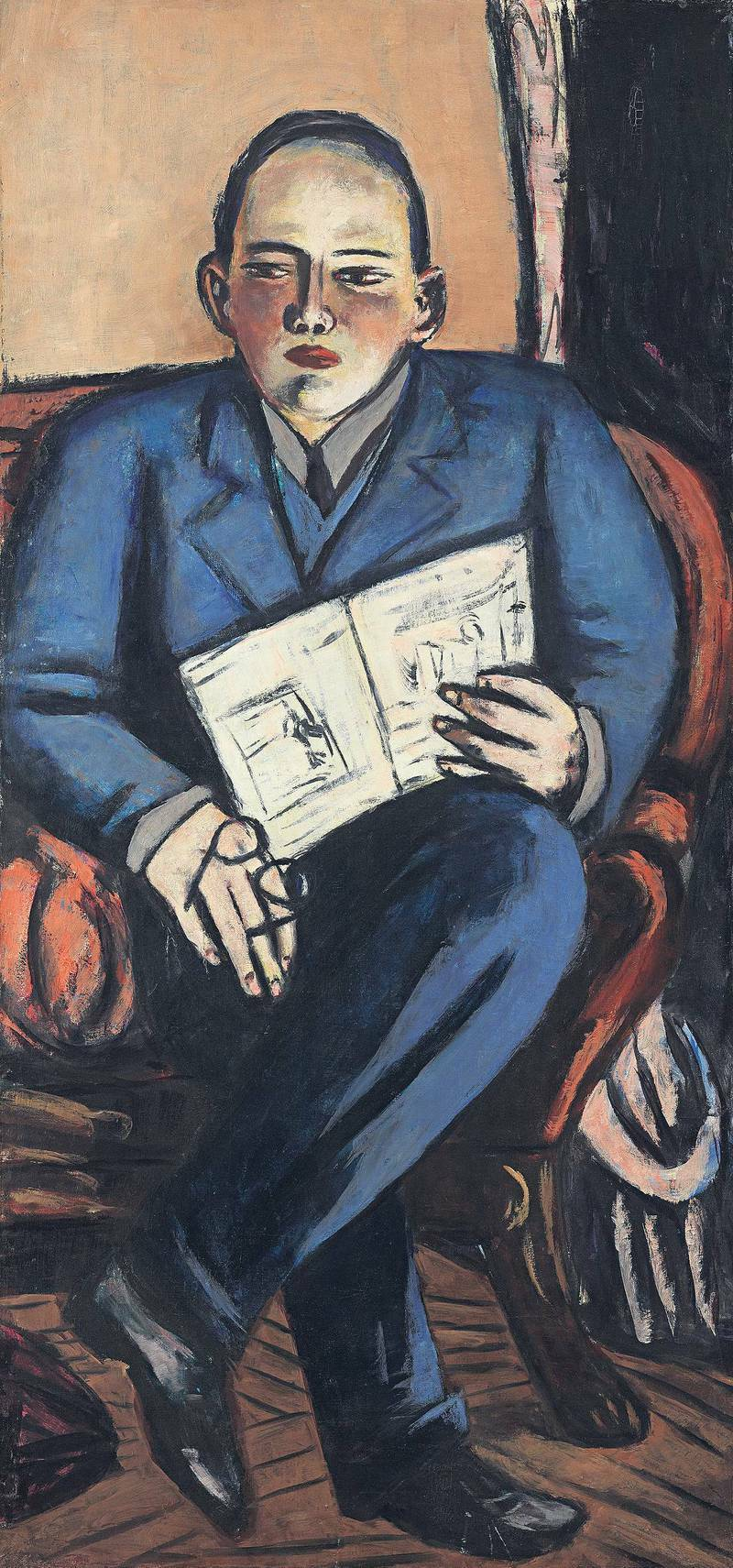
Max Beckmann: Portrait of Erhard Göpel (1944), Alte Nationalgalerie, Berlin

Erhard Göpel (born June 3, 1906 in Leipzig, † October 29, 1966 in Munich) was a German art historian and high level Nazi agent who acquired art, including looted art, for Hitler’s Führermuseum.

== Life and work before 1939 ==
Erhard Göpel (also spelled Goepel) studied art history with Wilhelm Pinder and Theodor Hetzer, who received his doctorate in 1937 with a thesis on "Anthonis van Dyck, Philipp Le Roy and the copper engravers". Göpel was also a fan of modern art and, as an art critic, wrote for liberal daily newspapers such as the Vossische Zeitung, Berliner Tageblatt and the Frankfurter Zeitung, articles for the journal Kunst und Künstler, published by Karl Scheffler.

== Nazi era ==
When the war broke out, Göpel served as an interpreter for various armed forces staff. From February 1942, Göpel was the representative of the Linz special commission to the Reich Commissioner in the occupied Dutch territories and responsible for the Linz special commission in France and Belgium.

Together with Hitler's art dealer Hildebrand Gurlitt, Goepel visited Beckmann in the autumn of 1944, when they were in the Netherlands buying paintings for Hitler's FührerMuseum in Linz.

The Sonderauftrag Linz was an organization set up by Hitler to acquire art for Hitler's Fuehrermuseum in Linz. The first director was the Dresden gallery director Hans Posse, who died in 1942. His successor as director of the Dresden gallery and as head of the special order Linz was the art historian Hermann Voss. Göpel worked for him and, under his supervision, procured works for Hitler's museum from the occupied western countries, much of it looted from Jews or acquired under duress. Göpel was also active in France. The deputy head of the special staff fine arts in Paris Bruno Lohse had set up an office for him in the rooms of the task force.

In 1943 Göpel played a leading role in the acquisition of large parts of the "Alphonse Schloss" Jewish art collection, which was confiscated in France and which was stolen from the owners in the south of France in cooperation with the police of the Vichy regime and the Reichsleiter Rosenberg (ERR) staff . An ERR task force, which at the time was under the command of Lohse and his colleague Borchers, stole the collection from Chambon Castle in southern France and finally handed it over to the Vichy government. The Louvre acquired 49 of the 330 paintings. From the remaining stock, Göpel and Bruno Lohse selected 262 pictures for the special order Linz. Göpel and Lohse received these pictures from the French on November 3, 1943 in the Jeu de Paume Museum, the ERR depot, from where they were then transported to Germany.

Göpel is also credited with protecting the painter Max Beckmann, who was vilified by the National Socialists and living in exile in Amsterdam. But what the personal relationship between the painter and Göpel was like is still unclear today. It is noticeable that Göpel's post-war journalistic activities only started after the painter's death in 1950. Beckmann completed a portrait of Göpel in 1944. In an analysis of Beckmann's 1943 painting Dream of Monte Carlo, art historians Christian Fuhrmeister and Susanne Kienlechner identified the central figures in the work as Göpel and Bruno Lohse, a notorious Nazi art looter.

== Investigated by the Art Looting Investigation Unit for role in Nazi looting, 1945-1946 ==
Erhard Göpel was considered a Red Flag Name for his involvement in the Nazi looting of art, notably from Jewish collectors. In 1945-6, the OSS Art Looting Investigation Unit published a series of reports about the Nazi looted art trade. Erhard Göpel in mentioned in the Consolidated Interrogation Reports concerning Hitler's Führermuseum, the E.R.R looting organization and the Hermann Goering Collection as well as in the Detailed Interrogation Reports concerning Hermann Voss, Heinrich Hoffmann, and Bruno Lohse.

== Postwar ==
After 1948 Göpel worked in Munich as a lecturer at Prestel-Verlag and as an art critic, he wrote, inter alia. Article for the Süddeutsche Zeitung and Die Zeit. A museum career at the Bayerische Staatsgemäldesammlungen failed, however, because of the opacity of its activities during the Third Reich. Nearly all of its advocates had collaborated in one way or another with the Linz Special Mission. Ernst Buchner, General Director of the Bavarian State Painting Collections, who wanted to get him this museum position, was one of Hitler's most important art advisors at the time.

Göpel worked on Max Beckmann, publishing “Max Beckmann der Konstruktor” (1954), “Max Beckmann in his late years” (1955), Beckmann's diaries from 1940 to 1950 as well as essays entitled “Max Beckmann. Eyewitness Reports”. In 1953 he was a co-founder of the Max Beckmann Society. His lifelong work for Beckmann culminated in the large two-volume catalog of paintings that his wife Barbara Göpel completed after his death in 1966 with the help of the Max Beckmann Society and which appeared in 1976.

Research into Göpel is ongoing. The discovery of the Gurlitt trove in the home of the son of Hildebrand Gurlitt reignited interest in Göpel's relations with Gurlitt and other known dealers of Nazi looted art.

== Donation of the Goepel collection to Berlin Museum ==
In 2018 Göpel's widow Barbara donated his collection of Max Beckmann artwork to the Berlin State Museums (Staatlichen Museen Berlin) which included forty-six drawings and fifty-two graphics by Beckmann, plus a landscape by Hans Purrmann. The donation was controversial because of Goepel's role in channeling Nazi looted art to Hitler's Führermuseum during the Third Reich. The Berlin State museums issued a statement saying there was "no concrete cause for suspicion that these works were looted"

== Restitutions of Nazi-looted art acquired through Göpel ==
In 2014, The Holy Family in a garden by The Master of the Antwerp Adoration (active Antwerp c. 1505-1530) was restituted to the heirs of Hands Ludwig Larsen from whom it had been seized during the Nazi occupation of the Netherlands. Göpel had acquired it for Hitler's Linz museum (Linz no. 2758) at Van Marle and Bignell, the Hague, 25 January 1943, lot 24.

== Writings ==
- Der Buchbinder Ignatz Wiemeler. Rohrer Verlag. Leipzig, Brünn u. a. 1938.
- Ein Bildnisauftrag für van Dyck - Anthonis van Dyck, Philipp Le Roy und die Kupferstecher. Prestel, Frankfurt a. M. 1940; zugl. Phil. Diss. Leipzig 1940.
- Die Bretagne : Volkstum, Geschichte, Kunst. Zeichnungen A. Conrad. Ein Armee-Oberkommando, Paris um 1940.
- Die Normandie. Von einem Armeeoberkommando. Hrsg. Erhard Göpel. Staackmann, Leipzig 1942. Weitere Auflagen Pariser Zeitung, Paris 1942.
- Neujahrsglückwünsche für 1944 Den Freunden in Herzlichkeit gewidmet von Erhard Goepel. Druck Haumont, Paris 1944.
- Max Beckmann. Der Zeichner. Piper, München 1954.
- Max Beckmann in seinen späten Jahren. München 1955
- Deutsche Holzschnitte des XX. Jahrhunderts. Wiesbaden 1955 (Insel-Bücherei Nr. 606)
- München. Lebenskreise einer Stadt. Lindau 1955 (Fotos von Peter Keetman)
- Max Beckmann. Der Maler. München 1957.
- Max Beckmann - Die Argonauten, ein Triptychon. Einführung von Erhard Göpel. Reclam, Stuttgart 1957.
- Deutsche Porträtplastik des zwanzigsten Jahrhunderts. Leipzig und Wiesbaden 1958 (Insel-Bücherei Nr. 650)
- Blick auf Beckmann - Dokumente und Vorträge. Für die Max-Beckmann Gesellschaft hrsg. von Hans Martin Frhr. von Erffa und Erhard Göpel. Piper, München 1962.
- Mit Barbara Göpel. Max Beckmann. Katalog der Gemälde. 2 Bde. Hrsg. Hans Martin Freiherr von Erffa (= Schriften der Max Beckmann Gesellschaft 3). Kornfeld, Bern 1976.
- Max Beckmann - Berichte eines Augenzeugen. Hrsg. und mit Einführung versehen von Barbara Göpel. Nachwort von Günter Busch. Frankfurt a. M. 1984. ISBN 3-596-23605-3.

== Literature about Erhard Göpel ==
- Jonathan Petropoulos: The faustian bargain. The art world in Nazi Germany. Oxford 2000.
- Stephan Reimertz: Max Beckmann. Biographie. München 2003.
- Birgit Schwarz: Hitlers Museum. Die Fotoalben Gemäldegalerie Linz: Dokumente zum "Führermuseum". Wien 2004.
- Andreas Hansert: Hermann Hesse, Max Beckmann und das Linzer „Führermuseum“ – Bibliophile Buchprojekte der Bauerschen Gießerei in Frankfurt während des Zweiten Weltkriegs. In: Kirchliche Zeitgeschichte 20, 2007.
- Andreas Hansert: Georg Hartmann (1870–1954). Biografie eines Frankfurter Schriftgießers, Bibliophilen und Kunstmäzens, Wien 2009
- Christian Fuhrmeister, Susanne Kienlechner: Erhard Göpel im Nationalsozialismus – eine Skizze. Zentralinstitut für Kunstgeschichte München 2018, Online-Ressource über das Kubikat (kooperatives bibliographisches Informationsangebot von vier Kunsthistorischen Instituten in Florenz, München, Paris, Rom).

== See also ==
- Fuhrermuseum
- Max Beckmann
- Hermann Voss (art historian)
- Hildebrand Gurlitt
