= Karl Haberstock =

Berlin art dealer who trafficked in Nazi-looted art

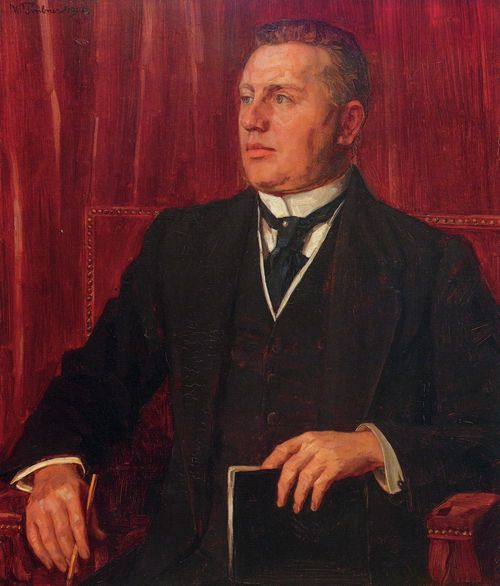
Karl Haberstock by Wilhelm Trübner, 1914.

Karl Haberstock (born 19 June 1878 in Augsburg; died 6 September 1956 in Munich) was a Berlin art dealer who trafficked in Nazi-looted art. Haberstock's name appears 60 times in the Art Looting Investigation Unit (ALIU) Reports 1945–1946 and ALIU Red Flag Names List and Index.

== Aryanization ==
Among Haberstock's many spoliation activities documented by the ALIU was the aryanization, with the assistance of Baron von Poellnitz and Roger Louis Adolphe Dequoy, of the Wildenstein firm which then continued to trade.

According to historian Jonathan Petropoulos "Haberstock, despite selling works to Göring and other Nazi elite, owed his status to Hitler alone."

== Arrest for Nazi art looting ==
At the end of World War II Haberstock was arrested for his Nazi art looting activities, however he testified against Hermann Göring at the Nuremberg Trials and was subsequently released. In the 1950s he opened a gallery in Munich living in the apartment below that of the director of Göring's art collection, Walter Andreas Hofer.

Haberstock's role in trafficking artworks looted from Jews was not generally known until reports that had been classified secret were published at the end of the twentieth century, in particular the ALIU Final Reportand the ALIU Detailed Interrogation Report (DIR) No. 13 Karl Haberstock May 1946.

== Donations to Augsburg ==
Haberstock donated forty paintings to the Augsburg Municipal Art Museum in Augsburg. Haberstock's portrait (shown in this entry) hangs prominently in the city's leading art museum, the Schaezlerpalais, and a minor residential street bears his name. After the declassification of the intelligence reports on Nazi looting, however, the museum was criticized for "glorifying" a notorious Nazi looted art dealer. “What we have here is a museum that glorifies the most notorious Nazi art dealer,” says Elan Steinberg, executive director of the World Jewish Congress, who has demanded that the local cultural authorities strip the galleries of grateful references to the Haberstock Foundation.

== See also ==
Nazi plunder
The Holocaust
List of claims for restitution for Nazi-looted art
Bruno Lohse
Hans Posse
Führermuseum
