= Fritz Dworschak =

Austrian numismatist and art historian (1890–1974)

- Born: February 27, 1890; Krems an der Donau
- Died: September 7, 1974 (aged 84)
- Education: University of Vienna; Institute for Austrian Historic Research

Friedrich Dworschak (27 February 1890 – 7 September 1974) was an Austrian numismatist and art historian, and museum director during the Nazi era.

== Biography ==
Fritz Dworschak, son of Ernest Dworschak and Franziska (née Knapp), was born in Krems an der Donau and attended elementary school there. From 1908 he studied history and art history at the University of Vienna, where he received his doctorate in March 1913.

After passing the state examination at the Institute for Austrian Historical Research in the same year, he worked as a volunteer at the Kunsthistorisches Museum in Vienna, where he was hired in 1915. In addition to his work as the museum's curator, he was also an expert on coins and medals at the Dorotheum from 1924 to 1939. In March 1938, Dworschak became the head of the Kunsthistorisches Museum, initially serving as its Kommissarischer Leiter (Provisional Director) and from 1941 until his dismissal from office on 26 April 1945 as its Erster Direktor (First Director).

== Nazi activities ==
In July 1938, Dworschak applied for membership in the NSDAP, citing his "all-German attitude" and because he had "always felt connected to the Hitler movement". This was initially rejected, but from October 1940 he carried the membership number 9,020,874. Supported by the weapons expert Leopold Ruprecht, who had already been active in the NSDAP since 1932, Dworschak administered the central depot for confiscated collections set up in the Neue Burg in the fall of 1938 "as a depository for objects from Viennese collections confiscated from Jews by the Nazi regime from mid-March 1938 onwards for subsequent dispersal in various museums. They included artworks belonging to the collectors Emmy Aldor, Bernhard Altmann, Alois Bauer, Leo Fürst, David Goldmann, Rudolf Gutmann, Felix Haas, Felix Kornfeld, Moritz Kuffner, Wally Kulka, Otto Pick, N. Pilzer, Valentin Viktor Rosenfeld, Alphonse Rothschild, Louis Rothschild and Alfons Thorsch, as well as objects of unknown origin."

From the summer of 1939, he coordinated the salvage operations from the Viennese state museums, the overall supervision of which was taken over in the summer of 1942 by Ludwig Berg of the General Department for the Promotion of the Arts, State Theaters, Museums and Public Education. In addition to these functions, Dworschak became an expert for the acquisition office for cultural property of the Reich Chamber of Fine Arts in August 1941. From August 1942 he also headed the "Special Order for Coins" and thus played the central role in the acquisitions of coins and medals for the "Führer Museum" planned in Linz. In October 1943 he married Elfriede Höbarth, who had been employed since June 1943 as a specialist in Greek coins for this special commission. He worked closely with Nazi art looters Seyss-Inquart and Muehlmann, and was listed by the Art Looting Investigation Unit Red on its Flag List of Names.

== Postwar ==
In 1946, Dworschak denied his NSDAP membership in the course of a People's Court trial. A federal employee, Dworschak was permanently retired in March 1947, but a few months later found employment as a contract employee of the city of Krems, where he remained until his retirement in 1958. In 1960 he was awarded the professional title of Hofrat "on account of special merits".

== Honors ==
- Ernennung zum Hofrat
- 1960: Ehrenmedaille der Stadt Wien
- 1970: Eckhel-Medaille der Österreichischen Numismatischen Gesellschaft.
- Porträtmedaille von Rudolf Schmidt
- Ehrenring der Stadt Krems

== Publications ==
- Krems, Stein und Mautern. Mit dem Katalog des Städtischen Museums in Krems an der Donau. Filser, Wien u. a. 1928.
- mit Karl Moeser: Die große Münzreform unter Erzherzog Sigmund von Tirol. Die ersten großen Silber- und deutschen Bildnismünzen aus der Münzstätte Hall im Inntal. Mit einer Ikonographie Erzherzog Sigmunds. = Erzherzog Sigmund der Münzreiche von Tirol. 1427–1496 (= Österreichisches Münz- und Geldwesen im Mittelalter. 7, ZDB-ID 2521622-3). E. Stepan, Wien 1936.
- Über 70 Artikel in Fachzeitschriften: Bernhard Koch: "Numismatisches Oevreverzeichnis". In: Numismatische Zeitschrift. Bd. 90, 1975, S. 3–6, (online).

== Literature ==
- Harry Kühnel: "Fritz Dworschak". In: Mitteilungen des Kremser Stadtarchivs. 1985, S. 23–25
- Herbert Haupt: Das Kunsthistorische Museum. Die Geschichte des Hauses am Ring. Hundert Jahre im Spiegel historischer Ereignisse. Brandstätter, Wien 1991, ISBN 3-85447-409-1.
- Birgit Schwarz: Auf Befehl des Führers. Hitler und der NS-Kunstraub. Theiss, Darmstadt 2014, ISBN 978-3-8062-2958-5.
- Emanuele Sbardella: Die dritte Seite der Medaille. Dworschak als Sonderbeauftragter Hitlers für den Aufbau eines Münzkabinetts im sog. Führermuseum, Masterarbeit, Technische Universität Berlin, 2015.
