= Hermann Voss (art historian) =

German art historian and museum director

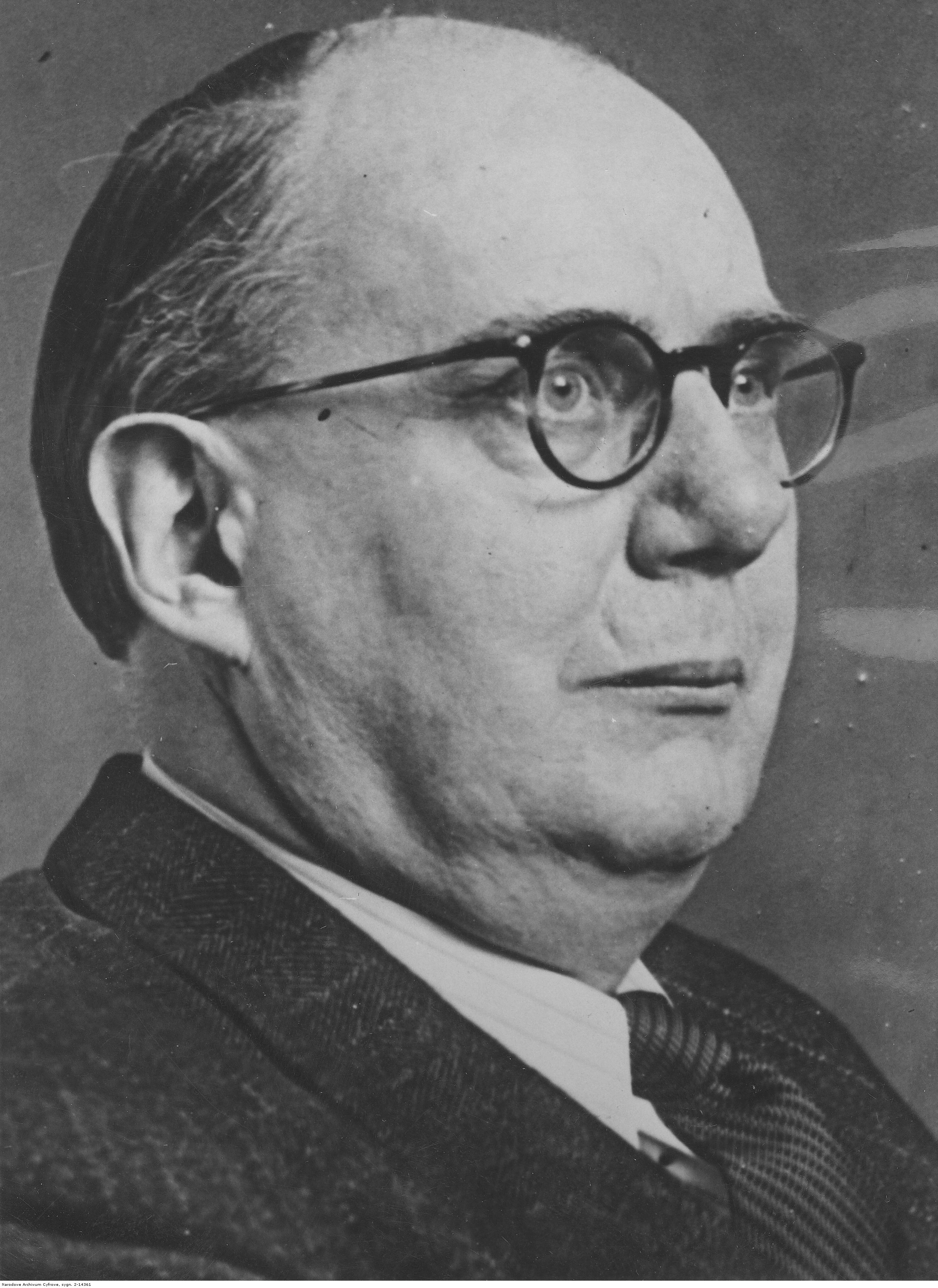
- 1943
- Born: July 30, 1884; Lüneburg, Kingdom of Prussia, German Empire
- Died: April 28, 1969 (aged 84); Munich, West Germany
- Education: Heidelberg University
- Occupation: Art historian

Hermann Voss (born July 30, 1884, in Lüneburg; died April 28, 1969, in Munich) was a German art historian and museum director appointed by Hitler to acquire art, much of it looted by Nazis, for Hitler's planned Führermuseum in Linz, Austria.

He is also credited with rediscovering Georges de La Tour, one of France’s greatest 17th-century painters. Though celebrated in his lifetime, La Tour’s work fell into obscurity, with many of his paintings misattributed to more commercially recognised artists.

== Education ==
Hermann Georg August Voss was born in Lüneburg in July 1884 as the son of the businessman Johann Voss and his wife Sophie Voss née Erzgräber. He attended the grammar school in Lüneburg and Stralsund, obtaining his secondary school leaving certificate in March 1903. Voss studied art history at Heidelberg University and Berlin and received his doctorate in 1907 under Henry Thode on the old German Renaissance painter Wolf Huber. From 1908 he volunteered with Wilhelm von Bode and Max Jakob Friedländer at the Royal Prussian Art Collections. His interest was in the then little-noticed art of the late Renaissance and early Baroque in Italy, which led him to work as an assistant at the Art History Institute in Florence from 1911 to 1912.

In December 1919, Voss married Marianne Boese, daughter of the painter Konrad Boese (1852–1938).

== Museum director ==
From 1912 to 1921, Voss was head of the drawing collection of the Museum of Fine Arts in Leipzig and, from 1922 to 1935, curator and deputy director of the Kaiser-Friedrich-Museum in Berlin. From 1935 to 1945, he headed the municipal art collection at the Nassauisches Landesmuseum in Wiesbaden, which was renamed Museum Wiesbaden postwar. Voss examined and appraised confiscated Jewish art collections and, through his Nazi and art market connections, was deeply involved in selling so-called "Degenerate Art" removed from museums and plundered from Jewish collectors. In March 1943 Voss was appointed, in addition, director of Sonderauftrages Linz (Special Commission: Linz), responsible for building the collections of Hitler's Führermuseum. Voss was, both before and after his appointment to direct Hitler's Führermuseum, a major player in the Nazi system of confiscations and forced sales of Jewish artworks.

=== Director of the Führermuseum 1943-1945 ===
In March 1943, on Hitler's instructions, Joseph Goebbels appointed Voss to succeed Hans Posse as director of the Dresden State Art Collections and director of the planned Führermuseum in Linz. Voss, with his art consultant Gottfried Reimer and many art dealers, acquired artworks in Germany, Austria and countries occupied by Nazi Germany including massive quantities of art looted from Jews during the Holocaust. Voss, like Posse before him, disposed of massive buying power and, after the Anschluss, the right of first refusal. Auction houses such the Dorotheum which traded massively in looted Jewish property also provided art for Voss. Voss frequently did business with Hildebrand Gurlitt, who procured art from Paris and Erhard Göpel, who was also an official Linz buyer. Many of the artworks destined for the Führermuseum also came through Maria Almas-Dietrich who had direct permission from Hitler to select artworks and acquired more art for Linz than any other dealer. During the Nazi occupation of France, Voss obtained numerous artworks looted from French Jewish collectors like the looted Schloss collection. According to Allied investigators, "VOSS' position in all this intrigue is the unenviable one of a professed lover of France who kept his hands clean by leaving the dirty work to others and not asking too many questions."

S. Lane Faison, who interrogated Voss in 1945 for the OSS Art Looting Intelligence Unit, recommended in his official interrogation report that Voss "be detained as a potential war criminal for the forthcoming war trials".

=== Interrogation of Voss in 1945 ===
Voss, who was based in Dresden, was left as director by the Soviet occupying forces after the end of the war. In July 1945, he fled back to the museum in Wiesbaden in the American zone of occupation, where he was immediately arrested.

Voss was interrogated from August 15 to September 15, 1945, in Altaussee by officers of the Art Looting Investigation Unit (ALIU), who were aware of his role as head of the special staff in Linz and his involvement in the acquisition of art looted from Jewish collectors. However, he gave little useful information that would have allowed the works to be returned to their owners. Voss stated that he had made 3,000 new acquisitions in his two-year tenure. Voss' statements can be found in the "Detailed Interrogation Report No. 12 Hermann Voss (DIR 12)" and in the report on the structure of the Führermuseum, "Consolidated Investigation Report No. 4 (CIR 4)", entitled Linz: Hitler's Museum And Library.

Voss underwent denazification, but avoided any punishment for his role in Nazi looting. On the denazification questionnaire, Voss failed to mention that he had been head of Hitler's Führermuseum in Linz. The Chamber did not notice the omission and considered that Voss was not concerned by the Law for Liberation from National Socialism and Militarism of March 5, 1946. The Public Prosecutor of the Chamber of Appeal, who was aware that the US authorities held incriminating material about Voss, started a new case against him. For this purpose, the Appeals Chamber asked the US military government in Munich for the requested material, the content of which it did not know and which was located in the Central Collecting Point in Munich. The US authorities had difficulty finding the material. Finally, the military administration sent reports "DIR 12" and "CIR 4" to the Appeals Chamber. However, these reports were lost in transit between German judicial authorities. As a result, the proceedings against Voss were discontinued on March 24, 1949.

== Postwar career ==
Voss enjoyed a successful career in the artworld after the war. An expert on the painting of the Seicento and Settecento, he wrote numerous essays, reviews and exhibition reviews that appeared in leading journals. He was recruited into the buying committee of the Bavarian State Painting Collections and acted as an advisor to the Bavarian State Government on art acquisitions.

On his 80th birthday, Voss was celebrated with a festschrift published by his (former) business partner, the art dealer Vitale Bloch.

Obituaries written about him were laudatory in nature.

== Nazi-looted art ==
After the war, the Allies photographed and catalogued each of the 4,731 pieces, including paintings and sculptures as well as furniture and works in porcelain. However, the investigative reports into Voss' role in acquiring Nazi looted art were classified secret for more than fifty years after the war. At the end of the Allied occupation of Germany, management of looted artworks recovered by the Monuments Men was returned to Germany which was supposed to restituted them to their original owners. Many artworks acquired by Voss for Hitler's museum ended up being distributed to museums in Germany and across Europe. Some were returned to their original owners, many were not. The families of Nazi officials and dealers in Nazi-looted art such as Hildebrand Gurlitt, Heinrich Hoffmann and Maria Almas-Dietrich submitted claims to looted artworks and in many cases were successful. Responding to demand for transparency, the German Historical Museum published a Linz database in 2008 and republished it in 2021 in order to assist researchers in tracking Nazi-looted art.

In recent years, many of the artworks Posse or Voss acquired have been found to have been looted.

Since August 2009, the Wiesbaden Museum has been researching the origins of more than 200 paintings that Voss bought for the museum between 1935 and 1944.

== Publications ==
- Deutsche Selbstkritik, Bachmair, Starnberg am See 1947.
- Gemäldesammlung Heinrich Scheufelen : Stuttgart-Oberlenningen, Bearb. unter Mitw. v. Juliane Harms. Hrsg. aus Anlaß d. Ausstellg d. Gemäldesammlg. H. Schleufelen in d. Gemäldegalerie d. Nassauischen Landesmuseums zu Wiesbaden im Sommer 1938. Stuttgart 1938.
- Amtlicher Katalog der Gemäldegalerie Wiesbaden, Nassauisches Landesmuseum, Wiesbaden 1937–1939.
- Sammlung Geheimrat Josef Cremer, Dortmund, (mit Friedrich Winkler) Wertheim, Berlin 1929.
- Die Malerei des Barock in Rom, Propyläen-Verlag, Berlin 1925.
- Geschichte der italienischen Barockmalerei, Propyläen-Verlag, Berlin 1925.
- Die Malerei der Spätrenaissance in Rom und Florenz, 2 Bände. G. Grote, Berlin, 1920.
- Der Ursprung des Donaustiles – Ein Stück Entwicklungsgeschichte deutscher Malerei, Hiersemann, Leipzig 1907.

== Literature ==
- Kathrin Iselt: „Sonderbeauftragter des Führers“: Der Kunsthistoriker und Museumsmann Hermann Voss (1884–1969) (= Studien zur Kunst, Band 20). Böhlau, Köln/Weimar/Wien 2010, ISBN 978-3-41220572-0 (Dissertation an der Technischen Universität Dresden 2009, 516 Seiten).
- Hanns Christian Löhr: Das Braune Haus der Kunst: Hitler und der Sonderauftrag Linz, Visionen, Verbrechen, Verluste. Akademie Verlag, Berlin 2005, ISBN 978-3-05004156-8, S. 51 ff.
- Birgit Schwarz: Hitlers Museum. Die Fotoalben Gemäldegalerie Linz. Dokumente zum „Führermuseum“. Böhlau, Wien 2004, ISBN 3-205-77054-4.
