= Führermuseum =

Unbuilt museum planned by Hitler for Linz, Austria

Coordinates: 48°17′25″N 14°17′31″E

The Führermuseum was an unrealized art museum within a cultural complex planned by Adolf Hitler for his hometown, the Austrian city of Linz, near his birthplace of Braunau. Its purpose was to display a selection of the art bought, confiscated or stolen by the Nazis from throughout Europe during World War II. The cultural district was to be part of an overall plan to recreate Linz, turning it into a cultural capital of Nazi Germany and one of the greatest art centers of Europe, overshadowing Vienna, for which Hitler had a personal distaste. He wanted to make the city more beautiful than Budapest, so it would be the most beautiful on the Danube River, as well as an industrial powerhouse and a hub of trade; the museum was planned to be one of the greatest in Europe.

A model of Adolf Hitler's planned Führermuseum in Linz, Austria, designed by Roderich Fick based on Hitler's sketches

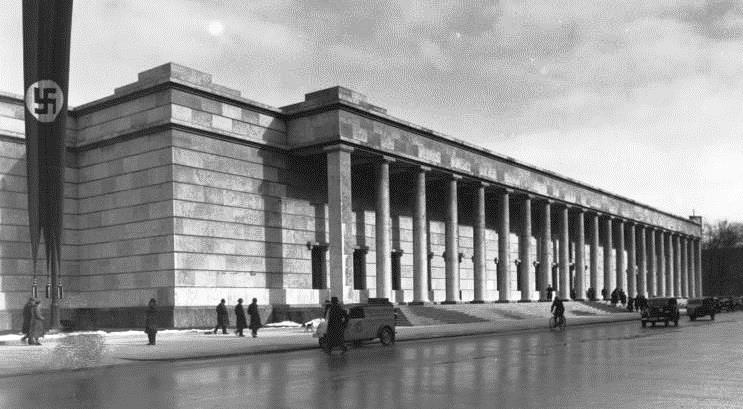
The design of the Führermuseum was based in part on the Haus der Deutschen Kunst in Munich, shown above. Built in 1933–1937 and designed by Paul Troost, with considerable input from Hitler, the Haus was one of the first monumental structures built during the Nazi era.

A model of the European Culture Centre; the facade of the Führermuseum can be seen at the centre of the image, near the top, facing the camera.

The expected completion date for the project was 1950, but neither the Führermuseum nor the cultural centre it was to anchor were ever built. The only part of the elaborate plan which was constructed was the Nibelungen Bridge, which is still extant.

== History and design ==
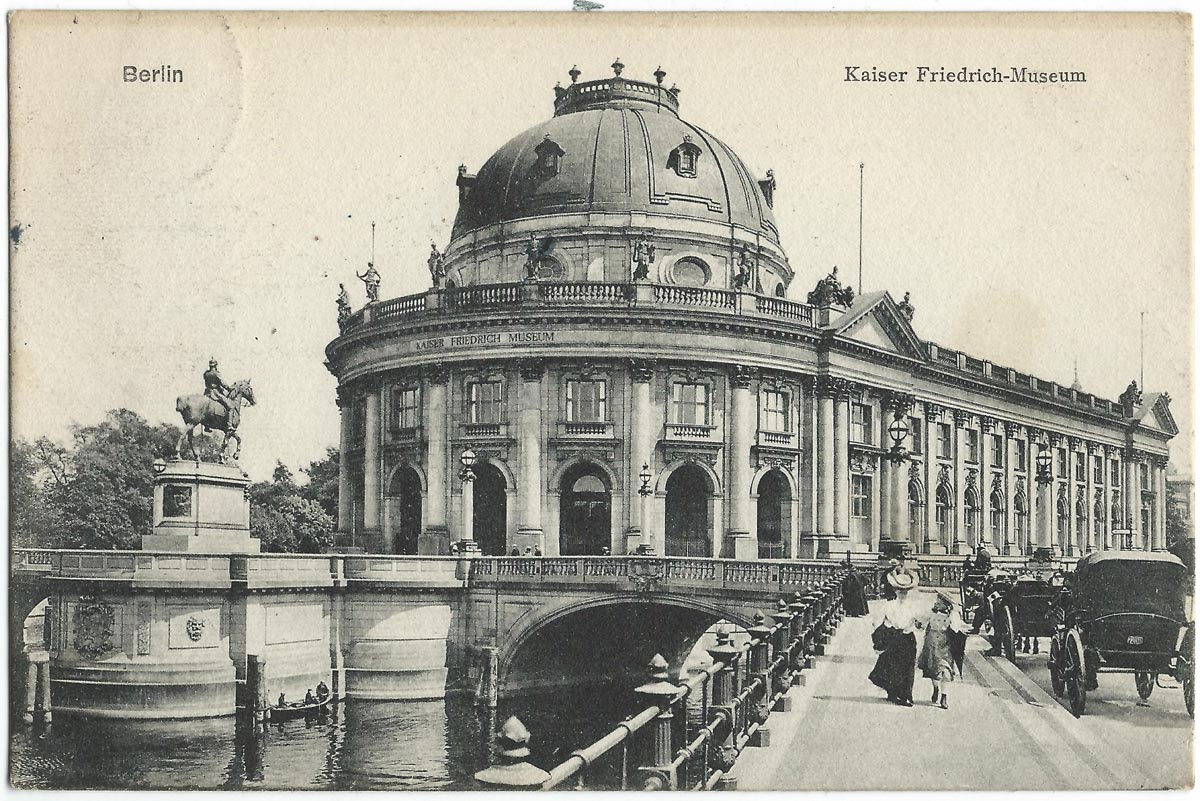
The Kaiser-Friedrich-Museum – now the Bode Museum – seen here in 1909, may have influenced Hitler's original design for a "German National Gallery".

As early as 1925, Hitler had conceived of a "German National Gallery" to be built in Berlin with himself as director. His plan, drawn out in a sketchbook, may have been influenced by the Kaiser-Friedrich-Museum, and consisted of a building with two sections, one with 28 rooms and the other with 32. Hitler denoted which of his favorite 19th-century German artists were to be collected, and in what rooms their work would hang. Among his favorite painters were Hans Makart, Franz Defregger, Eduard Grützner, Franz von Stuck, Franz von Lenbach, Anselm Feuerbach, Heinrich Zügel and Carl Spitzweg, and he had extolled "Aryan art" by Moritz von Schwind and Arnold Böcklin in Mein Kampf. At one time in his planning he dedicated five of the rooms in the museum to the work of Adolph von Menzel and three rooms to both Schwind and Böcklin. Carl Rottmann, Edouard von Engerth, and Anton von Werner were to share a single room, as were Makart and Karl von Piloty; Wilhelm Trübner and Fritz von Uhde; Grützner and Defregger; and the artists of the Nazarene movement. Other painters who would enjoy their own room in Hitler's original plans were Peter von Cornelius, Hans von Marées, Bonaventura Genelli, Anselm Feuerbach and Wilhelm Leibl. These choices reflected Hitler's taste at the time, which was a preference for sentimental 19th-century Germanic romantic painters, including "both 'schmaltzy' genre pictures ... [and] heroic, idyllic, allegorical. historical-patriotic themes, the visual equivalent of Wagner, without the genius."

It was after the Anschluss with Austria, with the House of German Art in Munich already completed, that Hitler conceived of having his dream museum not in any of the premiere cities in Germany, where it could be overshadowed, but in his "hometown" of Linz in Austria, and discussed his plans with the director of the local Provincial Museum, Theodor Kerschner, while visiting there.

Additionally, after a state trip to Rome, Florence and Naples in 1938 – between the Anschluss with Austria and the taking of the Sudetenland from Czechoslovakia – Hitler, "overwhelmed and challenged by the riches of the Italian museums" expanded the conception of his planned gallery. It would now be the unsurpassed art gallery in all of Europe, indeed "the greatest museum in the world", featuring the finest of all European art. He conceived that the best of Germanic art would have pride of place in the National Gallery in Berlin, while the new museum in Linz would feature the best of the art of the Mediterranean world, especially from the nineteenth century.

The idea and overall design concept for a new cultural district in Linz anchored by the Führermuseum was Hitler's own. He intended Linz to be one of the future cultural capitals of the Reich, to have its own university, and to overshadow Vienna, a city in which he had spent some years as a struggling artist, and about which he felt considerable distaste, not only because of the Jewish influence on the city, but because of his own failure to gain admission to the Vienna Academy of Fine Arts.

[Hitler] envisaged Linz as the future seat of the new German Kultur, and lavished all his limited pictorial talent and architectural training on a vast project which would realize this ambition.... [He] devoted a disproportionate amount of time and energy, for a chief of state, to the plans for Linz, personally creating the architectural scheme for an imposing array of public buildings, and setting the formula for an art collection which was to specialize heavily in his beloved, mawkish German school of the nineteenth century. His private library, discovered by the American Army deep in Austria, contained scores of completed architectural renderings for the Linz project...

According to one of Hitler's secretaries, he never tired of talking about his planned museum, and it was often the subject at his regular afternoon teas. He would expound on how the paintings were to be hung: with plenty of space between them, in rooms decorated with furniture and furnishings appropriate to the period, and how they were to be lit. No detail of the presentation of the artworks was too small for his consideration. He said of the museum in 1942 "Anyone who wants to study nineteenth-century painting will sooner or later find it necessary to go to the Linz gallery, because only there will it be possible to find complete collections."

=== Design and model ===
In Autumn 1940, Hitler commissioned architect Hermann Giesler, a devout Nazi, to be in overall charge of the rebuilding of Linz, one of the five designated Führerstädte ("Führer cities"), along with Berlin, Hamburg, Nuremberg and Munich, which were to be redeveloped drastically. Linz was to become a major cultural center, an art capital of Europe, a hub of trade and commerce, and the most beautiful city on the Danube, surpassing Budapest. It would have a new City Hall, new Nazi Party headquarters, a "Gau forum" featuring a massive auditorium, and a new railway station, a stadium, a community hall, a technical university, an institute of metallurgy, a planetarium, a suspension bridge, and two new towers, one of them with a carillon and a mausoleum for Hitler's parents. The city would also have Hitler's own retirement residence, designed by Giesler. In addition to all this, the Vienna facilities of the Hermann-Göring-Werks steel plant were to be moved to Linz as well, over the objections of officials of the city, the architects, and Fritz Todt, who thought the industrial facilities were incompatible with a city of art, architecture and culture. Hitler, though, wanted to provide the city with an ongoing means of income after he was dead and could no longer subsidize it.

The cultural center at the heart of the redevelopment, the buildings for which were based on Hitler's ideas and rough designs, came to be referred to as the "European Culture Center". It included a monumental theatre, a concert hall, a library with over 250,000 volumes, an opera house as well as an operetta house, a cinema, a collection of armor and an Adolf Hitler Hotel, all surrounded by huge boulevards and a parade ground. Located south of the historic section of Linz, the main buildings, including the Führermuseum, were to be aligned along one main avenue, In den Lauben, which after the war was called "a typical National Socialist axis street." It would be anchored at the other end by the new railway station.

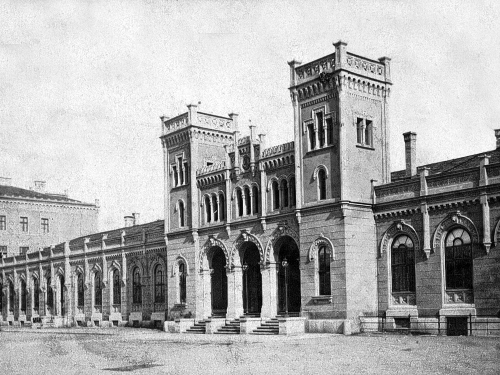
Linz's original central station building where the Führermuseum was intended to be located; the station would be moved 6.4 kilometres (4 mi) south.

The design of the many buildings of the cultural center were assigned to various architects Hitler favored. The museum itself was designed by Roderich Fick based closely on Hitler's sketches and specifications, modeled somewhat after Paul Troost's Haus der Deutschen Kunst ("House of German Art") in Munich – itself strongly influenced by Hitler's participation in the design process – and would feature a colonnaded facade about 500 feet (150 meters) long. It would stand on the site of the Linz railroad station, which was to be moved four kilometers to the south. Should the volume of German art bought, confiscated and plundered for the museum be such that expansion was needed, an additional building could easily be integrated into the planned district.

By January 1945, Hitler became obsessed with seeing a model of the planned cultural complex; he had his adjutants and Martin Bormann, his personal secretary and head of the Nazi Party Chancellery, call Giesler's office repeatedly, to ask when the Führer could view the model. Giesler's office worked around the clock to finish it. On the night of 7–8 February, Giesler brought the model to Berlin by truck and had it set up in the cellar of the New Chancellery building, where it was ready for viewing on 9 February by Hitler, Robert Ley, the Leader of the German Labor Front, and SS-Oberguppenfūhrer Ernst Kaltenbrunner, Chief of the Security Police, along with Hitler's personal photographer Walter Frentz and his valet, Heinz Linge. Frentz took some pictures of the event, one of which shows Hitler seated in deep contemplation of the model. Hitler was apparently entranced by what he saw:

Bent over the model, he viewed it from all angles, and in different kinds of lighting. He asked for a seat. He checked the proportions of the different buildings. He asked about the details of the bridges. He studied the model for a long time, apparently lost in thought. While Geisler stayed in Berlin, Hitler accompanied him twice daily to view the model, in the afternoon and again during the night. Others in his entourage were taken down to have his building plans explained to them as they pored over the model. Looking down on the model of a city which, he knew, would never be built, Hitler could fall in reverie, revisiting the fantasies of his youth, when he would dream with his friend Kubizek about rebuilding Linz.

Hitler visited the model frequently during his time living in the bunker under the Reich Chancellery, spending many hours sitting silently in front of it. The closer Germany came to military defeat, the more viewing the model became Hitler's only relief; being invited to view it with him was an indication of the Führer's esteem.

Near the end of the war, when American forces overran Hitler's private library, which was hidden deep in Austria, it contained "scores" of plans and renderings for the museum and the complex. They also found The Future Economic Status of the City of Linz a 78-page bound volume prepared for Hitler by the Economic and Research Section of the Oberdonau Department of the Interior, which outlined in detail how the revitalization of Linz would take place. The entire Linz project was treated as a state secret on Hitler's order.

== Collection ==
The collection for the planned museum in Linz was accumulated through several methods. Hitler himself sent Heinrich Heim, one of Martin Bormann's adjutants who had expertise in paintings and graphics, on trips to Italy and France to buy artworks, which Hitler paid for with his own money, which came from sales of Mein Kampf, real estate speculation on land in the area of the Berghof, Hitler's mountain retreat on the Obersalzberg, and royalties from Hitler's image used on postage stamps. The latter, which was divided with his official photographer Heinrich Hoffmann, amounted to at least 75 million marks over the course of Hitler's reign.

This, however, was not the primary method used to build up the collection.

=== Hitler's birthday ===
In Nazi Germany, Hitler's birthday was celebrated nationally on 20 April beginning in 1933, the year Hitler became Chancellor, through 1944. For his 50th birthday in 1939, the day was declared a National Holiday. As part of these celebrations Hitler would receive numerous presents, among which were paintings and other art objects. These were set aside for use in the planned Führermuseum in Linz.

Hitler's 56th birthday in 1945 was a private celebration held in the bunker under the Reich Chancellery in Berlin as the Soviet Red Army battled to take the city; even under those circumstances, Hitler would frequently spend hours in the bunker of the Chancellery looking at the scale model of the proposed rebuilding of Linz, which centered on the cultural district around the Fŭhrermuseum. Ten days after his birthday, Hitler married Eva Braun, and they committed suicide together on 30 April 1945.

=== Führer-Reserve ===
In the first weeks after the Anschluss in March 1938, which brought Austria into the German Reich, both the Gestapo and the Nazi Party confiscated numerous artworks for themselves. In response, on 18 June 1938, Hitler issued a decree placing all artwork that had been seized in Austria under the personal prerogative of the Führer:

As part of the seizure of assets hostile to the state – especially Jewish assets – in Austria, paintings and other artwork of great value, among other things, have been confiscated. The Führer requests that this artwork, for the most part from Jewish hands, be neither used as furnishings of administration offices or senior bureaucrats' official residences nor purchased by leading state and party leaders. The Führer plans to personally decide on the use of the property after its seizure. He is considering putting artwork first and foremost at the disposal of small Austrian towns for their collections.

The intent of the order was to guarantee that Hitler would have first choice of the plundered art for his planned Führermuseum and for other museums in the Reich. This later became a standard procedure for all purloined or confiscated art, and was known as the "Führer-Reserve."

=== Sonderauftrag Linz ===
On 21 June 1939, Hitler set up the Sonderauftrag Linz ("Special Commission Linz") in Dresden and – at the recommendation of art dealer and Nazi Party member Karl Haberstock – appointed Hans Posse, director of the Gemäldegalerie Alte Meister ("Dresden Painting Gallery"), as a special envoy. A few days later, on 26 June, Hitler signed a letter intended to give Posse the authority he would need to do this job. He wrote:

I commission Dr. Hans Posse, Director of Dresden Gallery, to build up the new art museum for Linz Donau. All Party and State services are ordered to assist Dr. Posse in fulfillment of his mission.

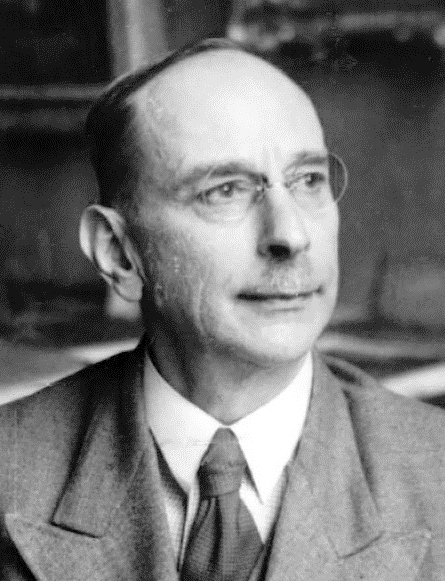
Hans Posse in 1938

Posse had a checkered relationship with the Nazis. His wife had joined the Nazi Party in 1932, but when Posse himself tried to join in 1933, his application was rejected a year later. He was later accused of having promoted so-called "Degenerate art", and of having Jewish ancestry. In 1938 he was asked to resign as director – a position he had held since 1910 from the age of 31 – but refused, taking a leave of absence instead. He was nevertheless fired, only to be restored to the position on Hitler's orders, possibly through the influence of Haberstock.

Although Hitler had favored German and Austrian paintings from the 19th century, Posse's focus was on early German, Dutch, French, and Italian paintings. Posse wrote in his diary that Hitler intended the museum to hold "only the best of all periods from the prehistoric beginnings of art...to the nineteenth century and recent times." Hitler told Posse that he was only to answer to him.

The Sonderauftrag not only collected art for the Führermuseum, but also for other museums in the German Reich, especially in the eastern territories. The artworks would have been distributed to these museums after the war. The Sonderauftrag was located in Dresden had approximately 20 specialists attached to it: "curators of paintings, prints, coins, and armor, a librarian, an architect, an administrator, photographers, and restorers." The staff included Robert Oertel and Gottfried Reimer of the Dresden Gallery, Friedrich Wolffhardt, an SS officer, as curator of books and autographs; Leopold Rupprecht of the Kunsthistorisches Museum as curator for armour, and Fritz Dworschak, also of that museum, as curator for coins.

==== Under Hans Posse ====
On 24 July 1939, Martin Bormann, Deputy Führer Rudolf Hess's assistant, informed Josef Bürckel, who Hitler had appointed to head the administration of Austria after the Anschluss, that all artwork which was confiscated was to be made available for examination by Posse or by Hitler personally. Although the order did not originally include the artworks taken earlier from the Vienna Rothschilds, by October Posse had managed to get those included in his remit as well.

In the late summer and autumn of that year, Posse traveled a number of times to Vienna to the Central Depot for confiscated art in the Neue Burg to pick out art pieces for the Linz museum, and in October he gave to Bormann, for Hitler's approval, the list of artworks confiscated from the Rothschilds which Posse had selected for the museum. These included works by Hans Holbein the Elder, van Dyck, Rembrandt, Frans Hals, Tintoretto, Gerard ter Borch and Francesco Guardi, among others. These 182 pieces were also included in Posse's July 1940 list of 324 paintings he had chosen for the museum's collection.

On 13 June 1940, Hitler authorized Posse to travel to the Netherlands, where he had to compete with Alfred Rosenberg's ERR organization (see below), Kajetan Mühlmann, Hermann Göring's art curator Walter Andres Hofer and Göring himself in claiming works by Dutch masters, many of which had been purloined, expropriated or confiscated by various Nazi agencies on a number of grounds.

Posse went to Poland around November 1940 to examine expropriated artworks there, some of which had been looted by the German Army from museums, palaces and country homes. All of the country's artworks in the German-occupied areas were then cataloged by SS officer and art historian Kajetan Mühlmann, who had done the same previously in Vienna. Posse selected works by Leonardo, Raphael, and Rembrandt for the museum in Linz, although these pieces never actually left the control of the General Government, the Nazi-occupied rump of Poland left after Germany and the Soviet Union took the territory they wanted.

On 10 June 1940, Posse wrote to Bormann:

The special delegate for the safeguarding of art and cultural properties has just returned from Holland. He notified me today that there exists at the moment a particularly favorable opportunity to purchase valuable works of art from Dutch dealers and private owners in German currency. Even though a large number of important works have doubtless been removed recently from Holland, I believe that the trade still contains many objects which are desirable for the Führer's collection, and which may be acquired without foreign exchange.

As a result of this, accounts of about 500,000 Reichsmarks were opened in Paris and Rome for Posse's personal use, and, around July 1940, he expanded the scope of the Sonderauftrag Linz into Belgium and the Netherlands when he established an office in The Hague as Referent für Sonderfragen (Adviser on "Special Questions"). Posse was able to report to Bormann that as of March 1941 he had spent 8,522,348 Reichsmarks on artworks for the Führermuseum. He later bought most of the Mannheimer Collection in 1944, including Rembrandt's Jewish Doctor – assisted by the threat of confiscation from the Nazi government of Arthur Seyss-Inquart – with the remainder of the collection being purchased in the same manner in France later on. The collecting of the Sonderauftrag Linz includes many such cases of forced sale, using funds from sales of Hitler's book Mein Kampf and stamps showing his portrait. Members of the Sonderauftrag Linz made a considerable number of purchasing trips throughout Europe, acquiring a significant number of artworks, and also arranged purchases through art dealers.

Hitler was pleased with Posse's work, and in 1940 awarded him the honorific of "Professor", something the Führer did for many of his favorites in the arts, such as Leni Riefenstahl, the actress and film director; architects Albert Speer and Hermann Giesler; sculptors Arno Breker and Josef Thorak; Wilhelm Furtwängler, conductor of the Berlin Philharmonic; actor Emil Jannings; and photographer Heinrich Hoffmann; among others.

In October 1939, Hitler and Benito Mussolini had made an agreement that any Germanic artworks in public museums in the South Tyrol – a traditionally German-speaking area which had been given to Italy after the First World War in return for entering the war on the side of the Triple Entente – could be removed and returned to Germany, but when Posse attempted to do so, with the assistance of Heinrich Himmler's Ahnenerbe, the Italians managed to keep putting things off, and no repatriations ever took place.

Posse died in December 1942 of cancer. His funeral was a high state event to which Hitler invited the directors of all art museums in the Reich; Propaganda Minister Joseph Goebbels delivered the eulogy, although there was no mention made of the Linz Museum project, since it was a state secret Posse had gathered more than 2500 artworks for the Linz museum in the three years he was head of the Sonderauftrag Linz.

==== Under Hermann Voss ====
In March 1943, Hermann Voss, an art historian, director of the Wiesbaden Gallery and former deputy director of the Kaiser Friedrich Museum in Berlin took over the Special Commission. His appointment was considered odd by some, since he was known to be an anti-Nazi with a considerable number of Jewish friends and colleagues, but Hitler was known to overlook political factors when dealing with matters of art, and Voss's knowledge of southern German artwork, as well as French and Italian painting, may have decided the matter for him. Voss was not nearly as active or energetic as Posse had been, but was still "caught squarely in the flow of loot." He was prone to send out agents rather than to travel himself to make purchases, or to make dealers bring works to him.

Hitler's relationship with Voss was not as warm as with Posse. The two men met only on several occasions, and Voss was not given authority over books, armour and coins, as Posse had been. Voss is said to have remarked after one meeting with the Führer, "He's even worse than I thought." Voss attempted to mend his fences with Hitler with an elaborate gift for his birthday in 1944, accompanied by a list of his acquisitions in which he claimed to have bought 881 items, compared to 122 paintings that Posse had collected the year before. Voss did indeed spend money more profligately than Posse had, and his budget was later reduced near the end of the war. Under interrogation after the war he claimed to have acquired 3000 paintings for the Führermuseum between 1943 and 1944, although the records do not support this figure, and many of the artworks were of distinctly secondary importance.

In April 1943, the German public first heard about the Linz project in a special edition of Heinrich Hoffmann's art magazine Kunst dem Volk ("Art to the People"). It revealed both the intention to build a great art gallery in Linz and the existence of the collection which had been amassed for it, although, of course, nothing was said about the objectionable methods used to acquire many of the pieces. The magazine featured colored plates of works in the collection by Rembrandt, Leonardo da Vinci, Breughel and Vermeer, among others. Up to that time, only two works which had been collected for the Linz museum had been seen by the public, although even for these their ultimate destination was never revealed. The first was Myron's sculpture Discobolus ("The Discus Thrower"), which Hitler obtained surreptitiously in 1938 through the Berlin State Museum, but ordered to be displayed at the Glyptothek in Munich, where he proudly told his invited guests at the unveiling: "may you all then realize how glorious man already was back then in his physical beauty". The other work was Makart's triptych The Plague in Florence, which Hitler acquired as a gift from Mussolini, who, when the owners refused to sell it, seized their villa and confiscated the painting. He then presented it to the Führer himself at the train station in Florence.

==== Results ====
By December 1944, Posse and Voss had collectively spent 70 million Reichsmarks (equivalent to 282 million 2021 euros) on accumulating the collection intended for the Fuhrermuseum; although artworks bought in Vichy France were paid for with francs which were set by the Nazis at an artificially low exchange rate with the Reichsmark. In 1945, the count of art items in the collection was over 8,000.

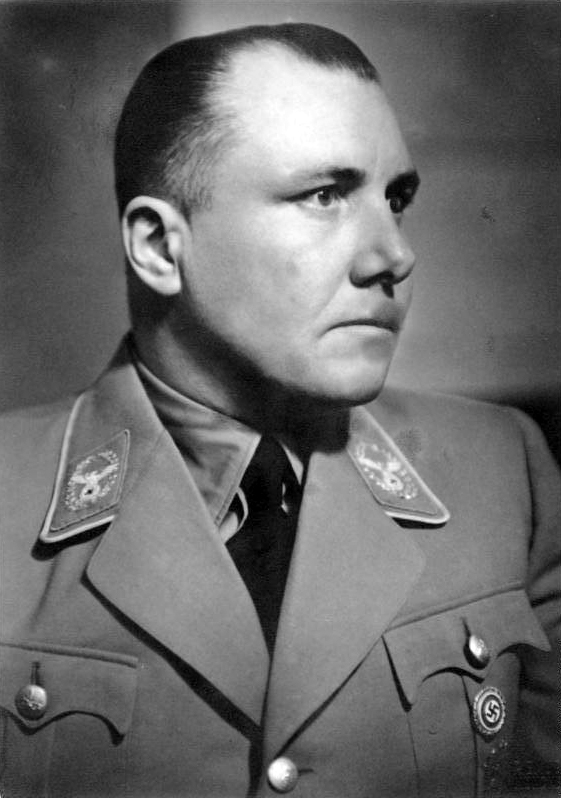
Martin Bormann in 1939

==== Legal authority ====
The legal authority for the collection of artworks for the Führermuseum began with Hitler himself, who, after the Enabling Act of 1933, had the power to enact laws without the involvement of the Reichstag. In effect, whatever Hitler directed to be done had the absolute force of law. It was his personal desire for the creation of a museum and the revitalization of Linz which began the collection program. Martin Bormann, who became chief of the Nazi Party Chancellery and also Hitler's private secretary, was also closely connected to the program from the beginning, in particular as a conduit providing access to Hitler. He also acted as the Chief of Staff for the Sonderauftrag Linz.

On the next level of hierarchy was Reichsminister Hans Lammers, who was President of the Reich Chancellery, and Helmut von Hummel, Bormann's Special Assistant who was described as "a particularly vicious Nazi" and had replaced Kurt Hanssen. It was Hummel who actually drew up the directives laying out the policies and procedures which governed the collecting process, both for confiscations and purchases. The financing and administration of the Linz program was the responsibility of Hummel and Lammers.

Other Nazi officials involved in the confiscation of art, but not specifically with collection for the Linz museum, included the Reich Minister for Science, Education, and Culture, Bernhard Rust; the Governor General for Poland, Hans Frank; and Heinrich Himmler, chief of the SS (Reichsführer-SS).

==== Photograph albums ====
In 2004, Birgit Schwarz published documents related to the project in a series of nineteen photographic albums. These "Führer albums", which were created between autumn 1940 and autumn 1944, were presented to Hitler every Christmas and on his birthday, April 20. Originally thirty-one volumes existed, but only nineteen have been preserved in Germany, and 11 are considered to be lost. The albums are documents of the intended gallery holdings and are the most important historical and visual sources relating to the gallery of the Führermuseum. Notably, the collection included three Rembrandts, La Danse by Watteau, the Memling portrait by Corsini, the Rubens Ganymede, and Vermeer's The Artist in His Studio, a forced sale far below market value.

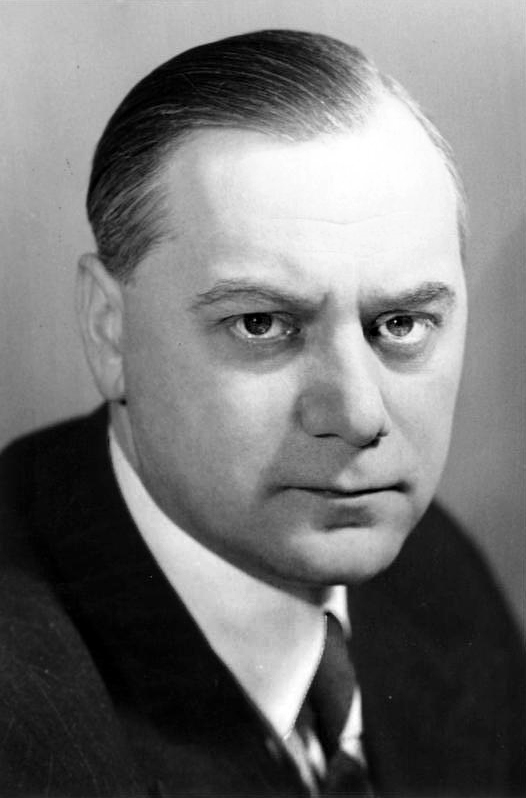
Alfred Rosenberg

=== Einsatzstab Reichsleiter Rosenberg (ERR) ===
In the "authoritarian anarchy" and "administrative chaos" that was typical of the way the Third Reich operated, the Sonderauftrag Linz was not the only Nazi agency collecting artworks. In France, as in many other countries in Europe, the office of Einsatzstab Reichsleiter Rosenberg (Special Purposes Reich Leader Rosenberg) was the primary agency. On 5 November 1940, a directive from Reichsmarschall Hermann Göring to Alfred Rosenberg, the head of the ERR, and to the Chief of Military Administration in Paris, outlines the several categories of "ownerless" art confiscated from Jews for what was referred to as "safeguarding". One of the categories were: "those art objects for the further disposition of which the Führer has reserved for himself the right of decision". Other categories were those works desired by Göring himself, and those destined for German museums apart from the Führermuseum. Although the directive was intended to be effective immediately, Göring indicates that he had yet to clear it with Hitler, but intended to do so.

Hitler then issued on 18 November his own directive, a Führerbefehl similar to the ones he had issued for Poland and Austria, announcing his prerogative over all confiscated art in occupied Western Europe. Rosenberg thus became a formal procurement agent for the Führermuseum, except when Göring intervened. This apparently brought about some internecine squabbling, as Dr. Posse had been given the authority to act on Hitler's behalf, and the German commanders of occupied countries were required to keep him regularly informed about their confiscations of artwork. Probably because of Göring's interference, Posse formally requested that the Reich Chancellery reiterate his power to act for the Führer. The result was a "general high-level directive" confirming Hitler's primacy through Posse, and a direction to Posse to review the ERR's inventory in regard to the needs of the planned museum in Linz.

On 20 March 1941, Rosenberg reported that his unit had proceeded to follow the directive, having "collected" over 4000 items; those personally selected by Göring had already been shipped by train to the air-raid shelters of the Führer Building in Munich. Several years later, on 16 April 1943, Rosenberg sent Hitler photographs of some of the more valuable paintings seized from throughout Western Europe, in addition to the 53 photographs he had sent earlier. Rosenberg asked for permission to see Hitler personally, to present a catalog of works seized, as well as 20 additional folders of photographs.

By one conservative estimate, about 21,903 objects were confiscated from France alone. Of these, about 700 went to Göring, 53 were earmarked for the Führermuseum in Linz, while Rosenberg kept the rest under his own control until 1945. In 2008, the German Historic Museum of Berlin published a database with paintings collected for the Führermuseum and for other museums in the German Reich.

==== Wolff-Metternich, Jaujard and Valland ====
The German occupation of Paris began on 14 June 1940, and on 30 June Hitler ordered that artworks in the French national collection be "safeguarded", and in particular "ownerless" art and historical documents – meaning works which were the property of Jews and could therefore be confiscated from them – be "protected" as well. Three days later, the German ambassador in France, Otto Abetz, ordered the confiscation of the collections of the 15 most important art dealers in the city, most of whom were Jewish. These pieces were then brought to the German Embassy. Through the actions of Count Franz von Wolff-Metternich, the head of the Kunstschutz (Art Protection) – an agency which dated from World War I and which had a mission which was superficially similar to that of the Allied Monuments, Fine Arts, and Archives program (MFAA) – Nazi military authorities intervened and stopped Abetz from making any more confiscations. Most of the artwork in the Embassy was then transferred for storage to the Louvre, at the suggestion of Jacques Jaujard, the Director of French National Museums.

Wolff-Metternich continued in his efforts to protect the artworks, which what he saw as the proper role of his agency. In particular, he was able to fend off Joseph Goebbels' demand that almost a thousand pieces of "Germanic" art held in the collection of confiscated pieces be shipped immediately to Germany. Wolff-Metternich did not disagree that the artworks properly belonged in the Reich, but did not think that sending them at the time was the correct course of action, and held off Goebbels with bureaucratic maneuvers and a strict interpretation of Hitler's directive, which specified that artwork in France should not be moved until a peace treaty between France and German had been signed, which had not as yet occurred.

The collection of artwork in the Louvre was destined to survive the war, and was not subjected to predation from the various Nazi entities confiscating and collecting artwork for shipment back to Germany, including those doing so for Hitler's planned museum in Linz. Wolff-Metternich was eventually removed from his office, as he was not pliable enough to provide the veneer of legality that was wanted by the Nazi authorities. Jaujard was fired as well after his vehement protest over the German theft of the Ghent Altarpiece in 1942, but when the staffs of every French museum resigned in protest over his dismissal, the Nazis were forced to restore him to his office, where he was able to continue to safeguard the French national collection, and provide assistance to the Resistance.

Jaujard, however, could do very little to protect the private art collections of Paris and France from the predations of the ERR. These collections – those of the French Rothschilds; Paul Rosenberg, the art dealer; Georges and Daniel Wildenstein; the investment banker Pierre David-Weill; Germain Seligman, the art historian and dealer; Alphonse Kann; and the other great collectors of the time – were systematically subjected to confiscations under various bureaucratically outlined pretenses of "protection", and were then brought to the Jeu de Paume museum, where they were cataloged and divided up for Hitler's collection – Posse took 53 paintings, for Göring's, for the use of Alfred Rosenberg's "scholarly" institutions which were attempting to prove the inferiority of Jews, as well as for other purposes. Fortunately, Rose Valland – at the time an unpaid museum employee, later the museum's attaché and Assistante, – was a member of the French resistance, and had remained working at the museum on Jaujard's orders. Valland kept lists of all the works which came in, the secret storehouses where they were stockpiled when they left the museum, and the numbers of the train cars when the last of the paintings were shipped to Germany just before the Allied recapturing of Paris. Using Valland's information, the Resistance was able to delay the train sufficiently so that it never reached Germany.

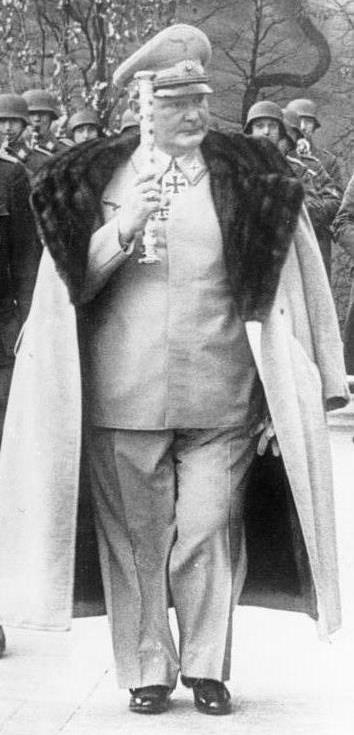
Hermann Göring in 1942

==== Hermann Göring ====
Although the ERR, in theory, was part of Alfred Rosenberg's Nazi empire, Rosenberg was an ideologue who had no interest in art, and did not appreciate the value to Germany of looting the patrimony of the occupied countries. Reichsmarschall Hermann Göring, on the other hand, Hitler's anointed successor and the head of the Luftwaffe, was an avid collector of confiscated artworks, with an unquenchable appetite for jewels and finery as well. As a result, the ERR in France became in large part "Göring's personal looting organization." During the course of the war, Göring paid 20 visits to the Jeu de Paume in Paris to views the results of the ERR's confiscations. At times Göring also utilized Kajetan Mühlmann, an Austrian art historian and SS officer, as his personal agent.

On occasion, Göring's desires conflicted with those of Hitler and Hitler's agents. When this occurred, Göring gave way, not wanting to provoke trouble with the Führer. Several times, he also made "gifts" to the collection of the Führermuseum. He sent 53 pieces from the French Rothschild Collection, which had been confiscated in Paris for him by the ERR, to Munich to be held for the Linz museum, including Vermeer's The Astronomer, sent in November 1940, and which became Hitler's most cherished painting in his collection. Later on, in 1945, Göring gave Hitler 17 paintings and 4 bronzes from the Naples Museum. These had been confiscated by the Hermann Göring Panzer Division while they were being shipped to safety from Monte Cassino to the Vatican, and were later presented to the Reichsmarschall at Carinhall, his "hunting lodge/art gallery/imperial palace."

At its peak, Göring's art collection included 1,375 paintings, 250 sculptures and 168 tapestries. Its value has been estimated at several hundred million marks.

When the Soviet Army was about to cross the Oder River into Germany in February 1945, threatening Carinhall, Göring began to evacuate his art collection by train, sending it to his other residences in the south of Germany. A second trainload went out in March. and a third in April. The contents of the shipments were personally chosen by Göring, who, at first, was inclined not to take the artwork he had acquired through the confiscations of the ERR, in case there might be questions of provenance in the future, but he was dissuaded from this course by Walter Andreas Hoffer, who was in charge of Göring's collection. Even after the contents of three long trains had left, Carinhall still had a considerable amount of art left in it, statues buried around the grounds, and looted furniture still in the rooms. Göring had Luftwaffe demolition experts wire the estate for destruction, so the treasures he had left behind would not fall into the hands of the Russians.

=== Dealers and agents ===
A number of art dealers and private individuals profited greatly from Hitler's campaign to stock his planned museum. Primary among them was Karl Haberstock, who operated a wide network of German agents in Paris, the south of France, the Netherlands and Switzerland, but also at least 75 French collaborators. Haberstock declined to take a commission on the major purchases for the museum, but took his regular fee otherwise, amassing a fortune. Thanks to his relationships with Hans Posse and with Hitler, he sold over 100 paintings designated for the Linz collection. When Posse went to France under Hitler's orders, he took the unscrupulous Haberstock with him, and the dealer, working through 82 local agents, purchased 62 pieces for the Linz collection, including works by Rembrandt, Brueghel, Watteau and Rubens.

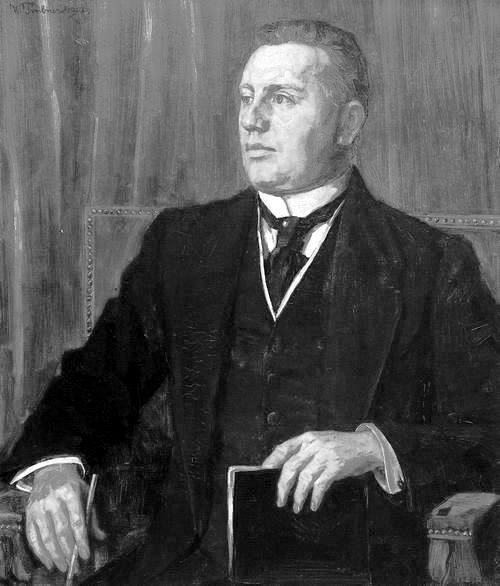
Karl Haberstock in 1914

Maria Almas Dietrich was another art dealer who did well by the Nazi obsession with obtaining art. An acquaintance of Hitler through his official photographer, Heinrich Hoffmann, Dietrich sold 80 paintings to the Linz museum collection, and a further 270 for Hitler's personal collection, as well as over 300 for other German museums and Nazi Party functionaries. Prolific rather than knowledgeable, Dietrich still managed to make a considerable amount of money from the Linz program. She also managed to avoid being sent to a concentration camp, despite having a Jewish father, bearing a child with her Jewish lover, and marrying a Jew from Turkey, although she renounced Judaism after divorcing him. Hitler, despite his rabid anti-Semitism, was frequently, but not consistently, an unconventional Nazi when it came to Jews involved in the arts. It may also have helped that Hitler's mistress Eva Braun was a friend of Dietrich's daughter.

Unlike Dietrich, SA-Gruppenführer Prince Philipp of Hessen was a connoisseur of the arts and architecture and acted as Posse's principal agent in Italy, where he lived with his wife, a daughter of King Victor Emmanuel. A grandson of the German Emperor Frederick III, and a great-grandson of Queen Victoria, Philipp provided "a veneer of aristocratic elegance which facilitated important purchases from the Italian nobility." Philipp assisted Posse in purchasing 90 paintings from Italy, and bought several more for the Linz collection on his own account.

Another dealer used by Hans Posse was Hildebrand Gurlitt, through whom he made expensive purchases of tapestries, paintings and drawings.

Other Nazi agents in the Linz program included Kajetan Mühlmann, a high SS official whose territories were Poland and the Netherlands; Baron Kurt von Behr, the head of the ERR in France; and Hitler's photographer Heinrich Hoffmann, an early art adviser who fell from Hitler's favor after 1941, due to Martin Bormann's dislike of him, but who had acted as an intermediary between some German art dealers and the Linz program, and possibly did the same in the Netherlands as well.

=== Confiscated or bought? ===
There is some debate about whether art for the Führermuseum was primarily stolen or purchased. Hanns Christian Löhr argues in Das Braune Haus der Kunst: Hitler und der "Sonderauftrag Linz" ("The Brown House of Art and the 'Sonderauftrag Linz'") that only a small portion of the collection – possibly 12 percent – came from seizures or expropriation. Moreover, another 2.5% was derived from forced sales. However, Jonathan Petropoulos, a historian at Loyola College in Baltimore and an expert in wartime looting, argues that most of the purchases were not "arm's length" in nature. Gerard Aalders, a Dutch historian, said those sales amounted to "technical looting," since the Netherlands and other occupied countries were forced to accept German Reichsmarks that ultimately proved worthless. Aalders argues that "If Hitler's or Goering's art agent stood on your doorstep and offered $10,000 for the painting instead of the $100,000 it was really worth, it was pretty hard to refuse." He adds that Nazis who encountered reluctant sellers threatened to confiscate the art or arrest the owner. Birgit Schwarz, an expert on the Führermuseum, in her review of Löhr's book, pointed out that the author focused on the purchases which were held in the Führerbau in Munich and ignored the deposits of looted art in Upper Austria in Thürntal, Kremsmünster and Hohenfurt/Vyssi Brod.

On the subject of purchases versus confiscations, Dr. Cris Whetton, the author of Hitler's Fortune commented:

I had expected to find that [Hitler] was directly responsible for looting and stealing of paintings that he wanted for himself, and I couldn't find any evidence of it, I found evidence that he paid for them; sometimes at knock-down prices, but not direct theft in any way. I was quite surprised by this, and I have to say in all honesty that's what I found.

The Dutch Advisory Committee on the Assessment of Restitution Applications for Items of Cultural Value and the Second World War assesses sales by Dutch Jews to the Sonderauftrag Linz. At least two restitution claims were rejected because the Committee argued that there were not enough indications showing coercion as the cause of the sale. For example, in 2009 the Restitution Committee rejected the application for the restitution of 12 works sold by the Jewish art dealer Kurt Walter Bachstitz to the Sonderauftrag Linz between 1940 and 1941. The Committee argued that Bachstitz had been "undisturbed" in the first years of the occupation and said it had not found signs of coercion. In 2012 the Commission rejected a claim of the heirs of Benjamin and Nathan Katz, former Jewish art dealers in the Netherlands. The claim related inter alia to 64 works that the art dealership Katz sold to the Sonderauftrag Linz. The Commission came to the conclusion that there were not enough indications demonstrating that the sales were made under duress.

Works which Hans Posse purchased in Vienna for the Linz collection included Vermeer's The Artist in His Studio / The Art of Painting, (Note: The Vermeer painting was purchased for 1.6 million Reichsmarks from Count Jaromir Czernin-Morzin, who claimed in the early 1950s that he had been coerced into the sale. Czernin-Morzin demanded restitution from the Austrian State, which provoked a legal investigation and a court action against Hitler's estate seeking to confiscate his private property. The Austrian government declared that the painting was the property of the Austrian State, and it was therefore sent to Vienna. Joachimsthaler, Anton (1996). The Last Days of Hitler: The Legends, the Evidence, the Truth. Translated by Helmut Bölger. London: Arms and Armour. pp. 10–11. ISBN 1-85409-380-0.) Titian's The Toilet of Venus, Antonio Canova's Polyhymnia, and several works by Rembrandt. Among the many paintings Karl Haberstock sold to the collection were two Rembrandts, one of which, Portrait of Hendrickje Stoffels is now thought to be from the Rembrandt workshop and not a work of the master. Oddly, Hitler purchased these for an inflated price, despite the fact that seller was a partly Jewish woman and the paintings could have been confiscated. Posse also purchased over 200 pieces which Jewish owners had managed to get into Switzerland, where they were safe from expropriation. On the other hand, Posse did not shy away from confiscation either, particular in the former Czechoslovakia and Poland, where all property was subject to it, but also in the Netherlands.

Hitler on 20 April 1945 in his last filmed public appearance, in the garden of the Reich Chancellery, 10 days before he and his newly married wife, Eva Braun, died by suicide on 30 April 1945

=== Size of the collection and Hitler's will ===
It is not possible to determine with any accuracy the size of the collection which had been amassed for Hitler's planned museum in Linz, but Frederick Spotts suggests that something around 7,000 pieces had been confiscated, bought or purloined specifically for the Führermuseum, and that others from the many other art repositories scattered around Germany would most probably have been added had Hitler won the war and he and his art experts had the opportunity to sort through the artworks and assign them to various museums. According to Spotts the figure of 7,000 accords well with the data released by the Art Looting Investigation Unit. Other experts quote higher figures of up to 8,500 for the ultimate size of the collection.

Despite its size, and the unprecedented access Hitler' agents had to artworks throughout Occupied Europe, the Linz collection had noticeable flaws. According to Spotts, its "gaps" included English art, Spanish art and art of the Northern Renaissance; major artists were missing from the Italian part of the collection as well.

Whatever its size and quality, near the end of the war Hitler wanted it understood that he meant the collection to be for the public – even though there were hundreds of artworks that were specifically marked for use in the Berghof, his mountain retreat, and for a castle in Posen which Hitler intended as another residence. Still, in his "Private Testament" – dictated in the underground Fuhrerbunker in the garden of the ruined Reich Chancellery building in Berlin, shortly before he committed suicide – he specified that the collection should go to the museum when it was built, writing that "The paintings in my private collection bought by me during the course of the years were never assembled for private purposes, but solely for the establishment of a picture gallery in my home town of Linz on the Danube."

== Storage and recovery ==
=== Repositories ===
The artworks collected for the Führermuseum were originally stored in a number of places. The purchases were mostly kept in the air raid shelters of the Führerbau in Munich – one of a number of large buildings Hitler had built in the birthplace of the Nazi Party – where they were under the control of the Nazi Party Chancellery; Hitler would often come to visit them and indulge in long discussions on art as one of the first tasks when coming to Munich, even during the war. Confiscated artworks were stored in deposits in the area of Upper Austria, located in the middle of forests or in the mountains. The ERR alone requisitioned six estates for storage, including Neuschwanstein Castle in the Bavarian Alps, in which items from France were stored; the Benedictine monastery on the island of Frauenchiemsee in the Chiemsee lake, halfway between Munich and Salzburg; an estate in the Salzkammergut hills, which had been a summer residence for the Austrian royal family; and the Grand Duke of Luxembourg's hunting lodge.

Rose Valland eventually shared the trove of information she had gathered at the Jeu de Paume museum, while the Nazis were using it as a way-station for confiscated art, with 1st Lt. James Rorimer, one of the "Monuments Men" of the MFAA, who would be attached to the U.S. Seventh Army. It would overrun the places in southern Germany – Heilbronn, Baxheim, Hohenschwangau and Neuschwanstein Castle – which Valland was certain were the locations of the repositories of much of the ERR-looted art which had been shipped back to Germany. Captain Walker Hancock, the Monuments officer for the U.S. First Army, learned the locations of 109 art repositories in Germany east of the Rhine from the former assistant of Count Wolff-Metternich of the Kunstschutz, thereby doubling the number of repositories known at that time. Additional information came to Monuments Men Captain Robert Posey and Private Lincoln Kirstein, who were attached to the U.S. Third Army, from Hermann Bunjes, a corrupted art scholar and former SS Captain who had been deeply involved in the ERR's Jeu de Paume operation on behalf of Hermann Göring. From Bunjes came the information that Göring had moved his collection out of Carinhall, and, most importantly, the revelation of the existence of a massive repository in the Altaussee salt mines, which included much of Hitler's collection intended for the Fuhrermuseum in Linz.

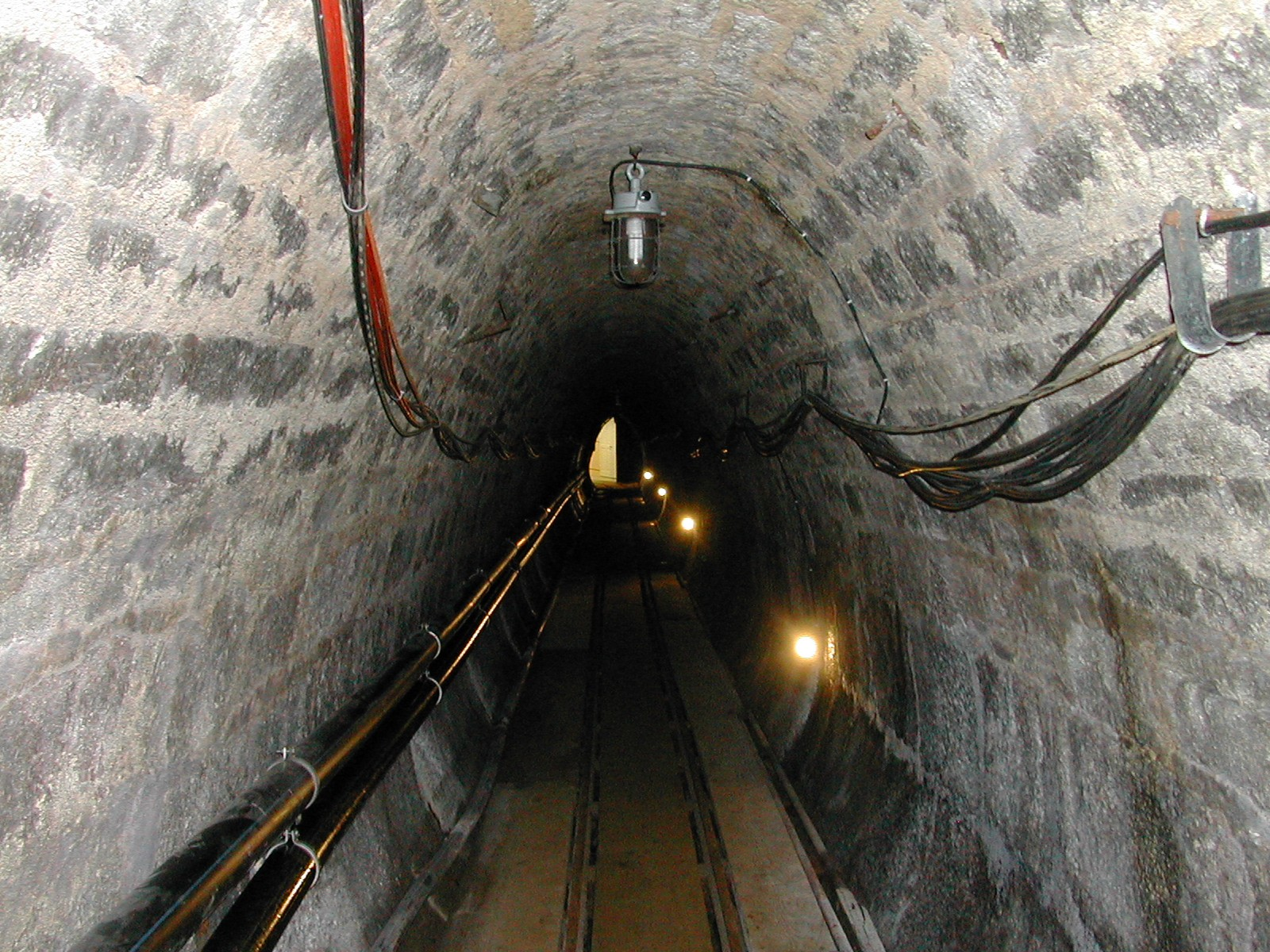
A tunnel in the Altaussee salt mine

=== Altaussee salt mines ===
Despite the fact that the original storage locations, which had no military purpose and were culturally important in any case, would have been extremely unlikely to have been the subject of an Allied air attack, in 1943 Hitler ordered that these collections be moved. Beginning in February 1944, the artworks were relocated to the 14th-century Steinberg salt mines above the village of Altaussee, code-named "Dora", in which the holdings of various Viennese museums had earlier been transferred. The transfer of Hitler's Linz collection from the repositories to the salt mine took 13 months to complete, and utilized both tanks and oxen when the trucks could not navigate the steep, narrow and winding roads because of the winter weather. The final convoy of purloined art arrived at the mine in April 1945, just weeks before V-E Day.

The labyrinthine salt mine has a single entrance, and a small gasoline-powered narrow-gauge engine pulling a flat car was utilized to navigate to the various caverns created by centuries of salt mining. Into these spaces, workmen built storage rooms which boasted wooden floors, racks specifically designed to hold the paintings and other artworks, up-to-date lighting, and dehumidification equipment. Despite the fact that the salt was mined using pipes and sluices through which flowed gravity-fed water from the mountain, which carried dissolved salt 17 miles away to Bad Ischl, where the water was evaporated, leaving behind the salt, the mine was not naturally humid, as the salt in the mine's walls absorbed excess moisture, keeping the chambers at a constant 65% humidity, while the temperature only varied from a low of 4 degrees Celsius (40 degrees Fahrenheit) in the winter to 8 degrees Celsius (47 degrees in the summer). Mining operations continued as the artwork was loaded into the mines, with the miners occasionally dragooned into helping to unload.

According to James S. Plaut, who from November 1944 to April 1946 was Director of the Art Looting Investigation Unit of the Office of Strategic Services (OSS), the salt mines held:

6755 old master paintings, of which 5350 were destined for Linz, 230 drawings, 1039 prints, 95 tapestries, 68 sculptures, 43 cases of objects d'art, and innumerable pieces of furniture; in addition, 119 cases of books from Hitler's library in Berlin, and 237 cases of books for the Linz library. (Note: In Monuments Men Edsel gives a slightly different list, which had been prepared by Karl Sieber, the art restorer, and Max Eder, an engineer at the mine, and subsequently given to MFAA officer George Stout: 6577 paintings; 230 drawings or watercolors; 954 prints; 137 pieces sculpture; 129 pieces arms and armor; 79 baskets of objects; 484 cases objects thought to be archives; 78 pieces furniture; 122 tapestries; 181 cases books; 1200–1700 cases apparently books or similar; 283 cases contents completely unknown; Edsel with Witter (2009), p.384)

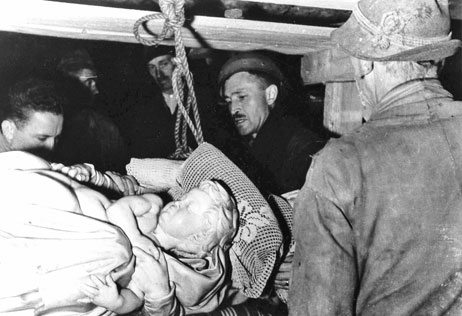
Michelangelo's Madonna of Bruges being removed from the mine

The noted Ghent Altarpiece – the stealing of which had caused Jacques Jaujard to protest vehemently and temporarily lose his job – arrived in the salt mine from Neuschwanstein in the autumn of 1944, and Michelangelo's Bruges Madonna in October of that year. Detailed records were kept at Dresden and moved to Schloss Weißenstein at the end of the war, where they were confiscated by the Soviets, but these were primarily of the paintings stored in Munich in the Fuhrerbau.

Also in the Altausee repository was The Plague in Florence by Hans Makart, a favorite of Hitler's. It had been given to him by Mussolini after Hitler had asked for it numerous times.

In April 1945, Supreme Allied Commander Dwight D. Eisenhower gave up Berlin as a "prestige objective" that would not be worth the troops killed in order to take it – the death toll was estimated at 100,000 – and ordered the Third and Seventh Armies to turn south, towards what the Allies feared might be an "Alpine Redoubt" from which Hitler or fanatical Nazis could operate a harassing guerilla campaign. The area was known to have hidden caches of arms and supplies, and intelligence reports had told of SS units moving from Berlin into that area. This new strategy meant that Neuschwanstein and Altausee would be overrun, and the "Monuments Men" would be able to verify and recover the important art repositories that their information said were located in those places.

=== Attempted destruction of the Altaussee repository ===
As the Allied troops approached the salt mines, August Eigruber, the Gauleiter of Upper Austria, gave orders to blow it up and destroy the artwork using the eight crates of 500-kilogram bombs he had stored in the mine on 10 and 13 April 1945. Hitler, through Martin Bormann, countermanded this order, and Albert Speer, the Minister of Armaments and War Production, had "clarified" Hitler's scorched earth "Nero Decree", but Eigruber felt he knew what Hitler's actual intent was. He ignored the pleas from the managers of the mine that it be saved as a vital resource – in Heilbronn another salt mine which was used to store art had been ordered to be blown up, but the miners refused to do so, as the mine was vital to their lives and livelihoods. After the Führer's suicide, Eigruber ignored the conflicting and confusing orders coming from Berlin and again ordered the destruction of the mine and all the artwork in it. The managers of the mine attempted to remove the crates of bombs, but were headed off by Eigruber's adjutant, who placed armed guards loyal to the Gauleiter at the entrance. The bombs were then wired for detonation by a demolition team.

Eigruber fled with an elite SS bodyguard, fully expecting his order of destruction to be carried out. Nevertheless, this did not happen. Instead, between 1 and 7 May 1945, before the arrival of U.S. Army troops on 8 May, the eight 500-kilogram bombs were removed from the mine, and the tunnels near the mine entrance were blown up, blocking the mine and protecting it from intrusion without doing damage to the irreplaceable and priceless art collection inside.

Who, exactly, was responsible for saving the artwork took many years to determine, and was finally unravelled in the 1980s by Austrian historian Ernst Kubin. The plan was devised by Dr. Emmerich Pöchmüller, the general director of the mine, Eberhard Mayerhoffer, the technical director, and Otto Högler, the mine's foreman. It was sanctioned by Ernst Kaltenbrunner, an SS officer of high rank in the Gestapo who had grown up in the area, and was later convicted of mass-murder and hanged. The plan was carried out by the miners, with the tacit approval of Eigruber's guards, several of whom had been persuaded by Karl Sieber, an art restorer who had worked on paintings stored in the mine, that destroying the artwork and the mine was not a good idea. The entire operation took three weeks to implement. On 5 May the signal was given, and six tons of explosives with 386 detonators and 502 timing switches were activated, causing 66 blasts which closed off 137 tunnels. The blockages took about a month to clear away totally, although a hole big enough for a man to sidle through was completed by the miners overnight after the Americans arrived.

The signatories at the Yalta Conference gave Eastern Austria to the Soviet Union. As the United States did not want the paintings and artworks in the mine falling to the Soviets they were quickly transferred elsewhere in about two weeks, rather than the year which had originally been planned.

Most of the approximately 12,000 pieces of art in the mine were recovered. The Altaussee trove included both works meant specifically for the Führermuseum and other looted artwork as well. Other caches of art not intended for Linz were recovered in places throughout the Reich; there were over 1000 repositories in southern Germany alone, although some of the artworks in them came from the collections of German museums – these were eventually returned. Much of Göring's collection from his estate at Carinhall was discovered in a cave at Berchtesgaden, where he had a summer home near Hitler's Berghof retreat, part of it was also left in his private train, which was found in Unterstein, and had been looted by the local residents.

=== Looting of the Munich repository ===
Part of the collection designated for the Linz museum was stored in the air raid shelters of the Führer Building in Munich, part of the Nazi complex there. The building was broken into by a mob before American troops arrived in the city, and most of the 723 paintings still there were looted, while others were taken by American soldiers. Only 148 paintings were eventually recovered.

== Post-war ==
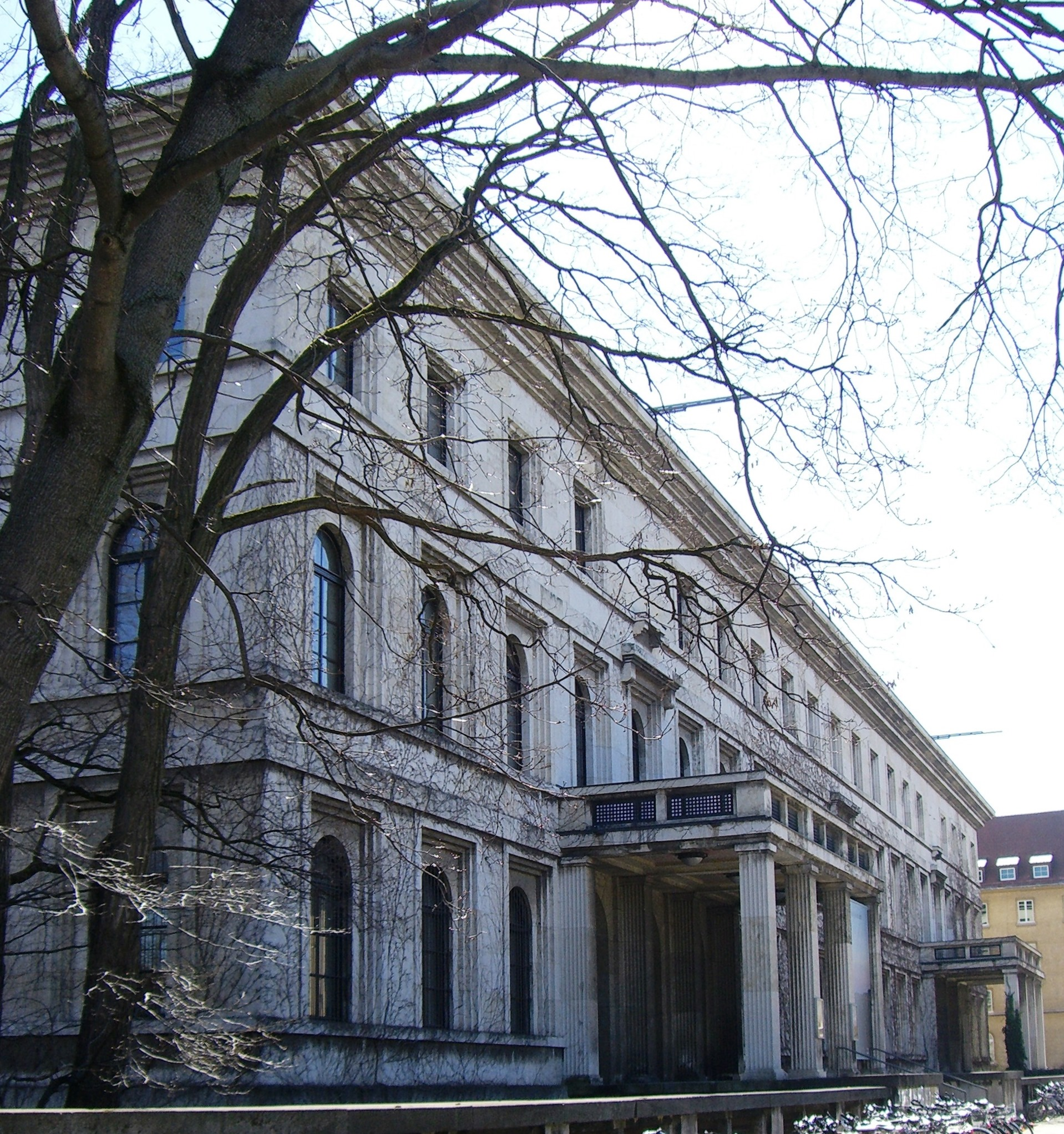
The first building of the "Central Collecting Point" in Munich, which later became the Museum of Casts of Classical Statues; it had been an administrative building for the Nazi Party. Later, other buildings in the complex were used when this building was full.

After the war, the American Art Looting Investigation Unit (ALIU) of the Office of Strategic Services (OSS) made thirteen detailed reports on the Linz museum and the Nazi plundering of art. These reports were synthesised into four consolidated reports; the fourth of these was written by S. Lane Faison covering the Führermuseum. These reports focused on returning art to rightful owners. The authority for this was the 1943 Declaration of London, which invalidated all German art purchases in the occupied territories.

Most of the paintings and other artworks were brought to the "Central Collecting Point" in Munich, a former Nazi Party administrative building, where they were registered and rephotographed if necessary. Restitutions occurred as early as autumn 1945. The work was turned over to German authorities in September 1949. In 1962, the responsible agency was disbanded, and the remaining unreturnable artworks were assessed for their value as museum items. These were loaned to various museums, while other pieces are on loan to government agencies.

Jacques Jaujard, the French Director of National Museums, was hailed as a national hero following the war for his part in saving the French national art collection. He was made a Commander of the Legion of Honor and given the Medal of Resistance. Rose Valland, who surreptitiously collected information on the looted artwork that passed through the Jeu de Paume museum, became a fine arts officer with the French First Army and assisted the MFAA in the collection of looted artwork. She was inducted into the French Legion of Honor and also received the Medal of Resistance, was awarded the Medal of Freedom from the U.S. and the Officer's Cross of the Order of Merit from West Germany. In 1953, she finally received the coveted title of "curator". Count Franz von Wolff-Metternich, the "good German" arts officer who helped to protect the French national art collection from Nazi predation worked with the Allies after the war, return artworks to their rightful owners, then joined the West German Foreign Office, where he tracked looted art.

The men of the Altaussee salt mine who were responsible for saving the artwork stored there by preventing the mine from being blown up did not fare well in the postwar period. All members of the Nazi Party, as were most professionals at that time in order to be allowed to work, they were all affected to one degree or another by the post-war denazification efforts. None of them received during their lifetimes the credit that was due to them for their acts in saving a significant portion of the art which had been looted by the Nazis from the Occupied Territories.

In Eastern Europe, Soviet premier Joseph Stalin tasked Mikhail Khrapchenko with taking many of the Führermuseum artworks to stock Soviet art galleries. Khrapchenko said "it would now be possible to turn Moscow's Pushkin Museum into one of the world's great museums, like the British Museum, the Louvre, or the Hermitage." Stockpiled artwork was recovered by the Soviet "Trophy Brigades" from the two enormous flaktowers which had been built in Berlin to shelter people and supplies; many of the paintings in the Friedrichshain Flaktower were destroyed by fires.

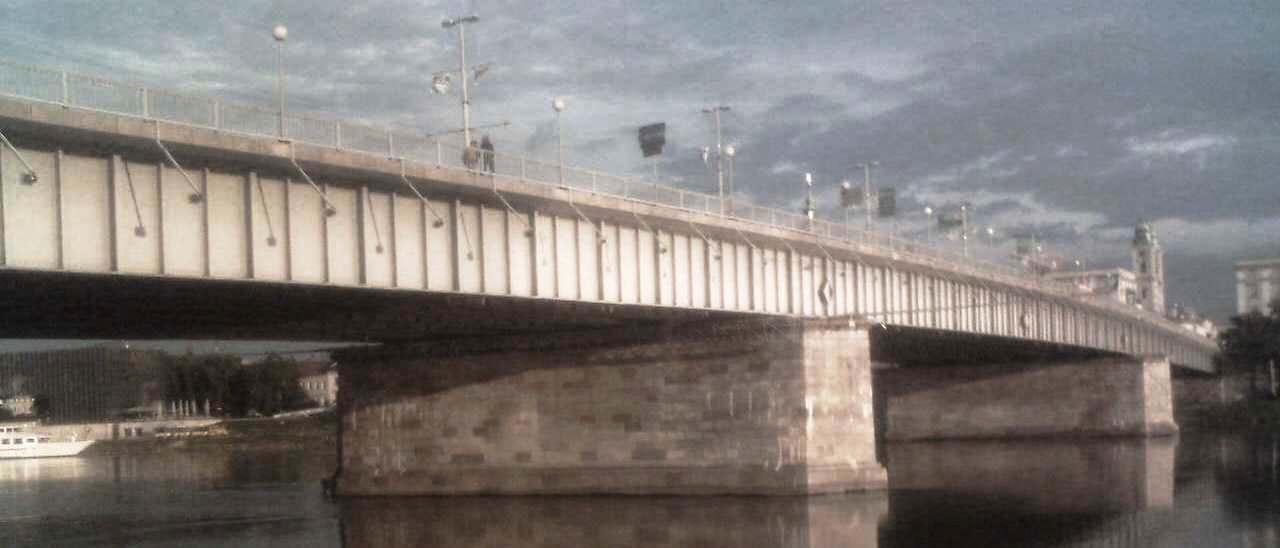
The Nibelungen Bridge in Linz, the only part of Hitler's planned cultural district ever built

=== Recent developments ===
In 1998, the Federal Republic of Germany and 43 other countries agreed to the "Washington Principles", which required them to closely inspect their art inventories to establish the provenance of works which had changed ownership between 1933 and 1945. In particular, German, France, Austria and the Netherlands and other countries publicly disclosed what artworks from the Sonderauftrag Linz collection remained in their inventories. The work began in Germany in 2000, and artworks which are "shown by renewed research to involve a persecution-related deprivation of property during the National Socialist period are to be returned." In his book Das Braune Haus der Kunst: Hitler und der "Sonderauftrag Linz" ("The Brown House of Art and the 'Sonderauftrag Linz'"), published in Germany in 2005, Hans Christian Löhr argued that 191 artworks were missing at that time, and that they may be hanging in museums or private collections. This is discussed in the film documentary The Rape of Europa and in Noah Charney's book The Ghent Altarpiece, Stealing the Mystic Lamb.

As of 2010, a photo album that an American soldier took from the Berghof, Hitler's vacation home, which catalogued artwork Hitler desired for the museum, was to be returned to Germany. Of the photo albums created for Hitler, 39 of them were discovered by American armed forces at Neuschwanstein, where they had been deposited for safekeeping in April 1945. These were used as evidence in the Nuremberg trials, and are now at the United States National Archives, with two others donated by Robert Edsel in 2007 and c.2013. Edsel is the author of the book The Monuments Men about the activities of the Allied Monuments, Fine Arts, and Archives program (MFAA), on which the film of the same name was loosely based, and also the founder of the Monuments Men Foundation for the Preservation of Art. He got the two albums from the heirs of an American soldier. Nineteen other albums recovered from Berchtesgaden were in Germany on permanent loan from the German Federal Archives (Bundesarchiv) to the German Historical Museum as of 2010, and 11 albums are considered to be lost.

== Gallery ==
Some masterpieces intended for the Führermuseum in Linz

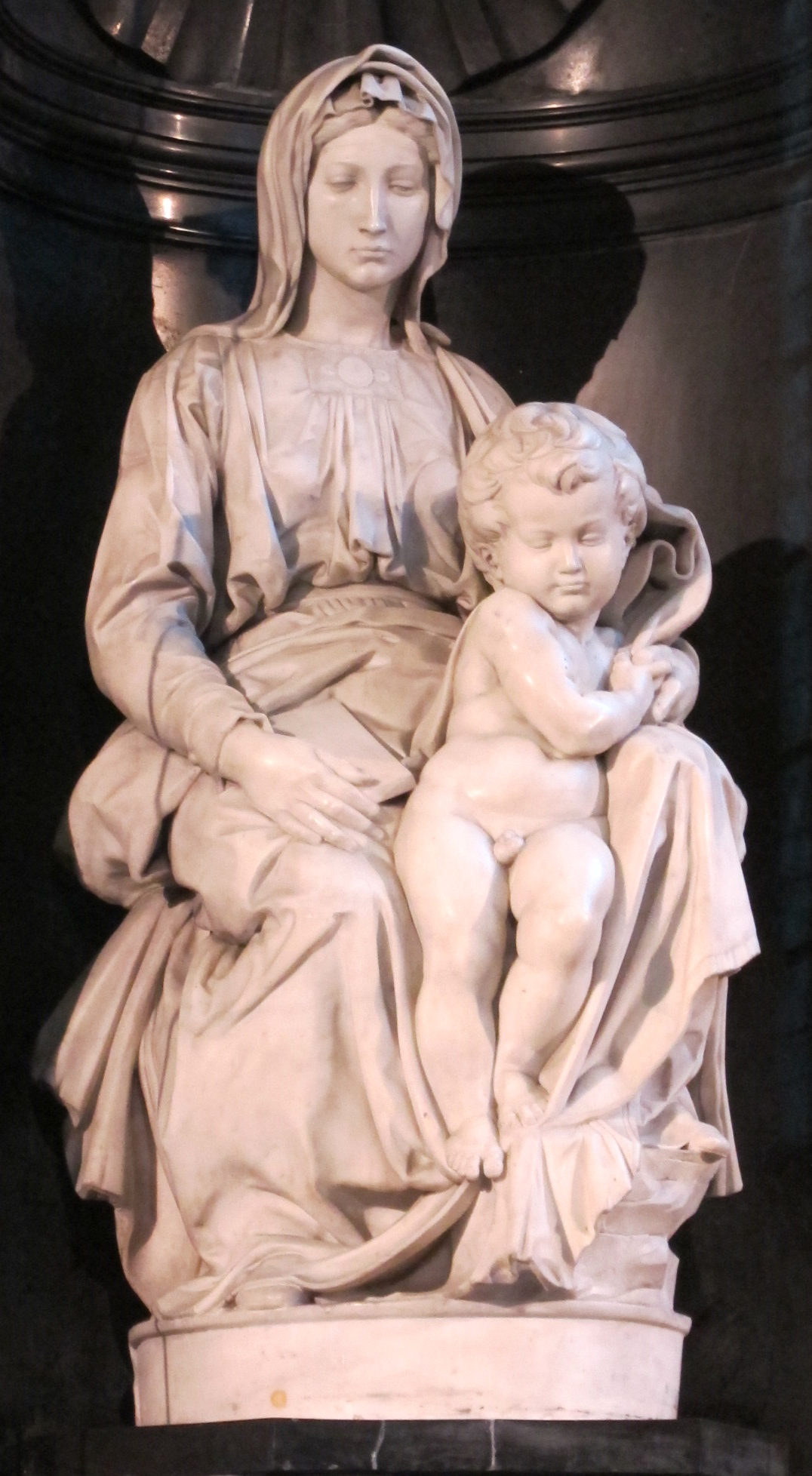
Madonna of Bruges by Michelangelo (1501–1504)
(This was Michelangelo's only work located outside of Italy in his lifetime. Napoleon took it after he conquered Belgium in 1794; it was returned after he was defeated 20 years later.)

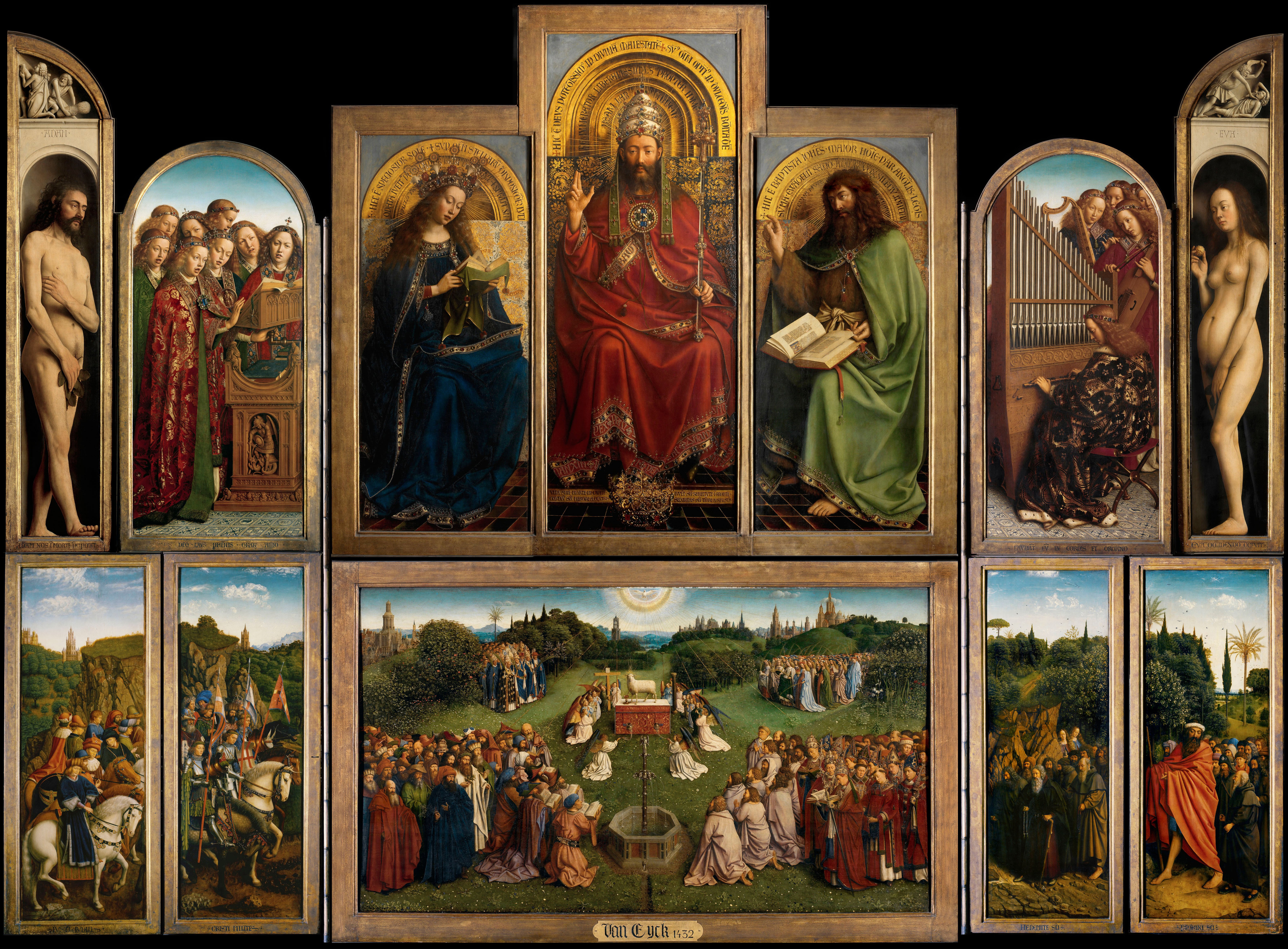
Adoration of the Mystic Lamb (the Ghent Altarpiece)
by Hubert and Jan van Eyck (1430–1432)
(The altarpiece was taken from a French repository in a château in Pau, where it had been left in 1940 by a Belgian convoy hoping to carry the country's national treasures to safety in the Vatican. In 1942, Hitler sent a secret delegation to get it; when the repository refused to turn it over, they were ordered to do so by Pierre Laval of the collaborationist Vichy government.)

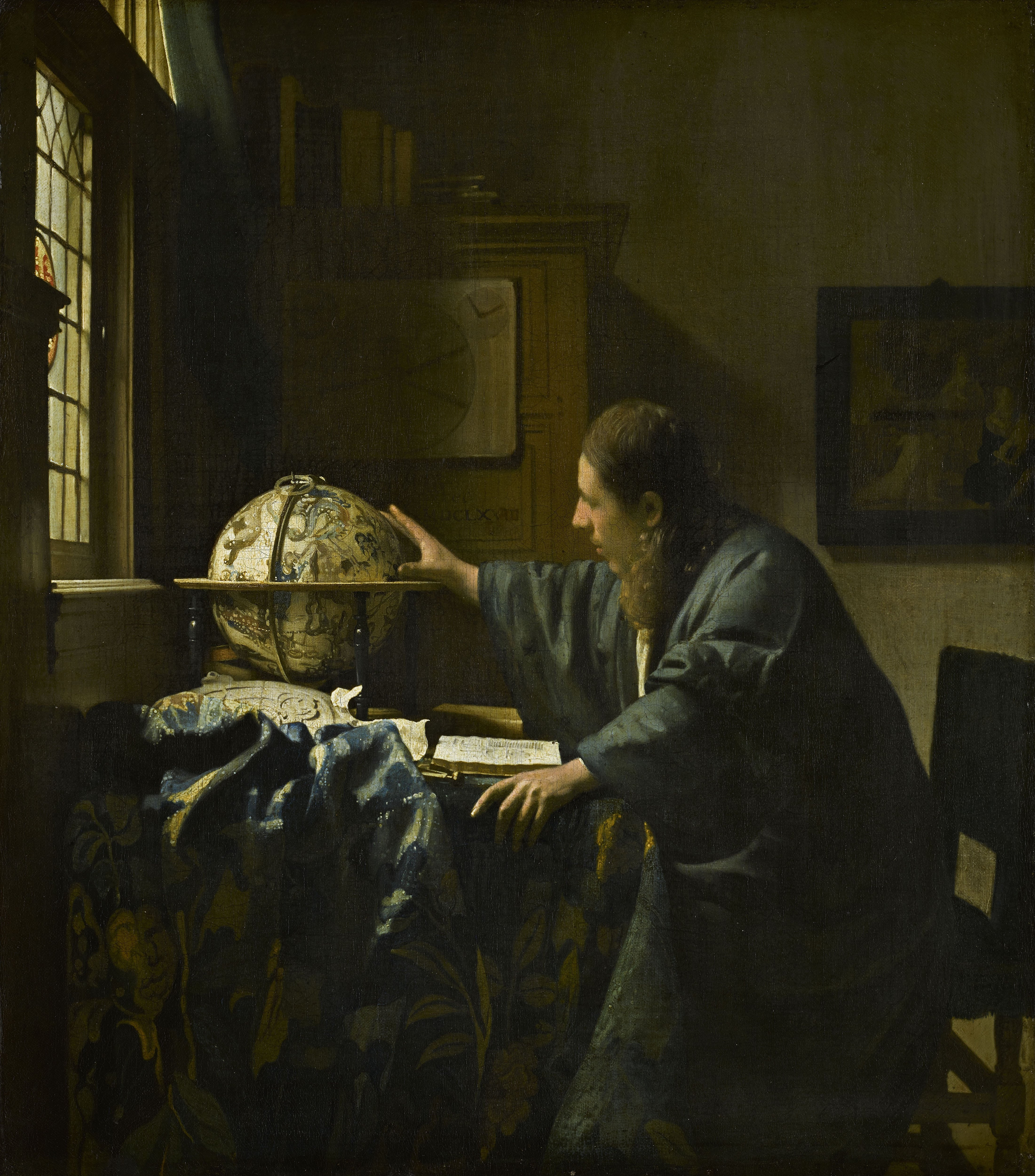
The Astronomer by Johannes Vermeer
(c.1668)
(This was one of Hitler's favorite paintings, and was said to be the one he coveted the most in France. He kept a photograph of it in his office in the Reich Chancellery.)

== See also ==
- List of claims for restitution for Nazi-looted art
- Bruno Lohse, Göring's art agent in Paris
- Gurlitt Collection
- Nazi plunder
- Monuments, Fine Arts, and Archives program (MFAA, the "monuments men")
- The Monuments Men (2014 film)
