= Bruno Lohse =

German art dealer (1911–2007)

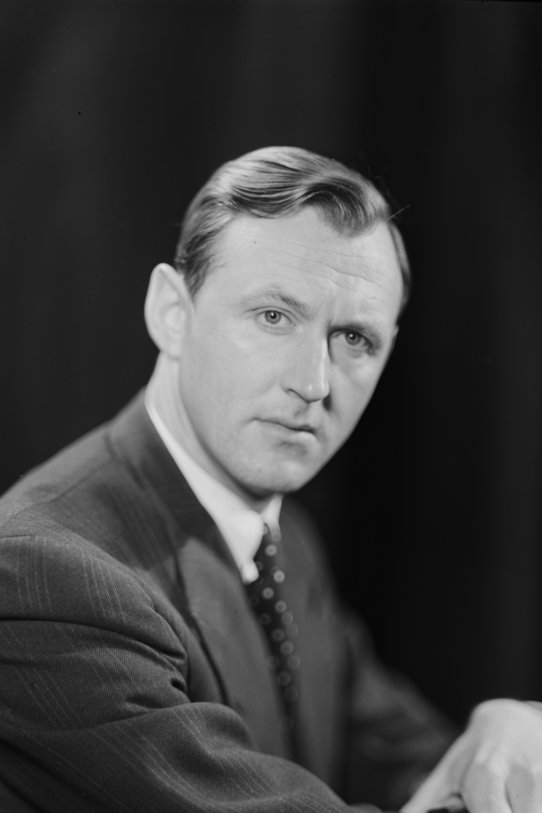

Personal details
- Born: 17 September 1911 Düingdorf, German Empire
- Died: 19 March 2007 (aged 95) Munich, Germany
- Occupation: Art dealer and historian
- Known for: Art dealer during the Nazi era, war profiteering

Military service
- Allegiance: Nazi Germany
- Branch/service: Schutzstaffel
- Years of service: 1933–1945
- Rank: SS-Hauptsturmführer
- Unit: Reichsleiter Rosenberg Taskforce
- Battles/wars: World War II
- Awards: War Merit Cross

Wilhelm Peter Bruno Lohse (17 September 1911 – 19 March 2007) was a German art dealer and SS-Hauptsturmführer who, during World War II, became the chief art looter in Paris for Hermann Göring, helping the Nazi leader amass a vast collection of plundered artworks. During the war, Göring boasted that he owned the largest private art collection in Europe. His story is told in the documentary film, Plunderer: The Life and Times of a Nazi Art Thief (2025).

== World War II ==
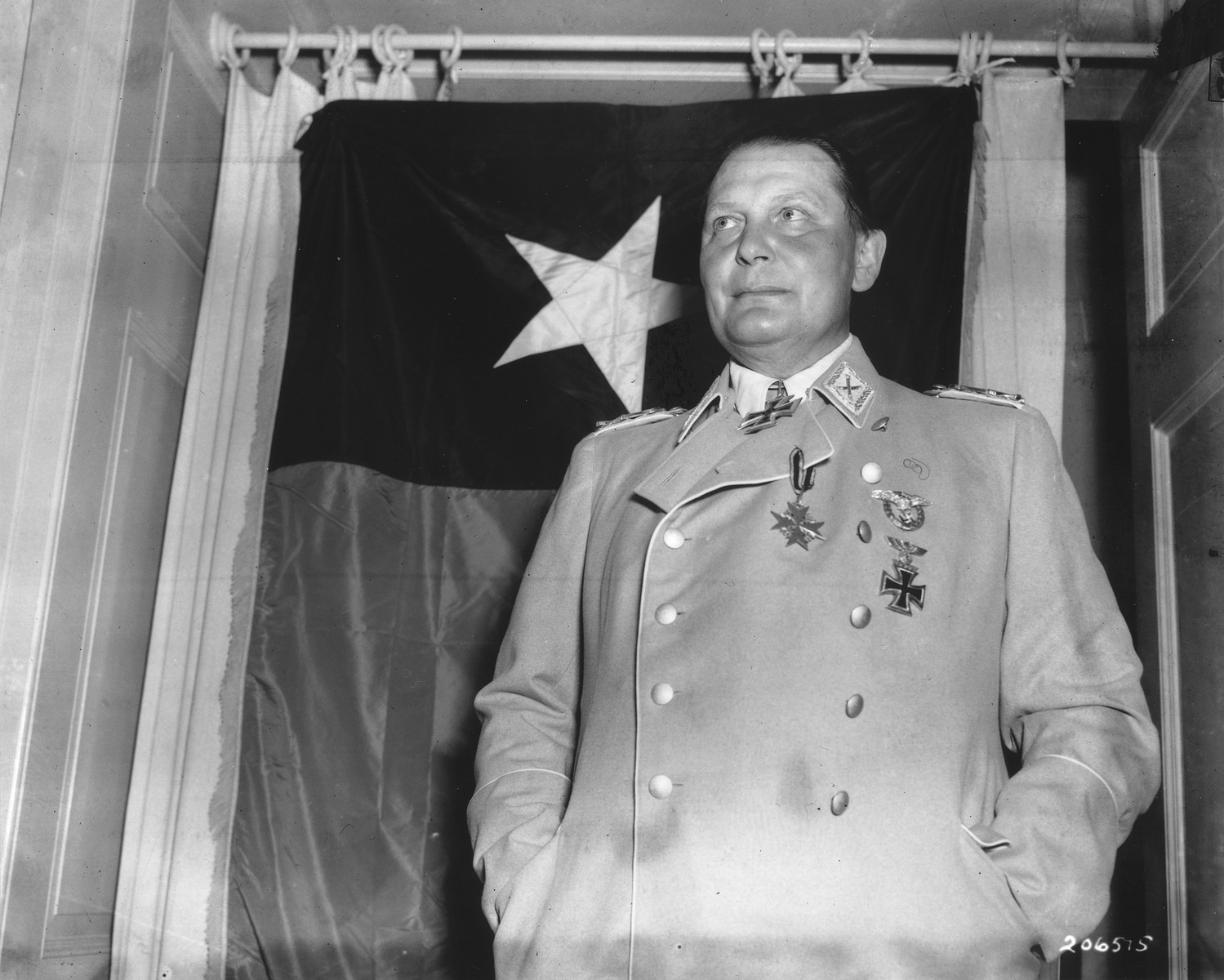
Göring in captivity 9 May 1945

Lohse, who published a scholarly thesis on the painter Jacob Philipp Hackert in 1936, worked as an art dealer in Berlin from 1936 to 1939, selling paintings out of his father's home. Having joined the SS in 1933, Lohse became a member of the Nazi Party in 1937. He would eventually be drafted into Göring's Luftwaffe, then appointed by Göring to the Einsatzstab Reichsleiter Rosenberg (ERR), Hitler's special art looting unit.

Lohse arrived in Paris by November 1940 to help catalogue the celebrated and eclectic collection of Alphonse Kann, which numbered 1,202 items. Though Lohse reported to Paris ERR chief Kurt von Behr (1890–1945), he enjoyed "special agent" status conferred on him by Göring. Among other privileges, Lohse was not required to wear a uniform for the nearly four years he lived in occupied Paris. As the ERR's Deputy Director in Paris from 1942 to 1944, Lohse helped supervise the systematic theft of at least 22,000 paintings and art objects in France, most of which were taken from Jewish families.

Although Lohse set aside the most highly prized Old Masters for Hitler's Führer Museum (planned in Linz), he helped Göring develop his own enormous private art collection, which accumulated during the war at Göring's vast German estate, Carinhall. Between November 1940 and November 1942, Lohse staged 20 exhibitions of looted art for Hitler's second-in-command in the Jeu de Paume (museum), from which Göring selected at least 594 pieces for his own collection.

Lohse was awarded the War Merit Cross, 2nd class by Adolf Hitler because of his activities in art theft in Paris.

== Interrogation and imprisonment ==
Lohse fled Paris in August 1944 and briefly served in one of Göring's safe Berlin regiments before travelling to Neuschwanstein Castle in February 1945, where a major cache of art looted in France (as well as the Rothschild family jewels) had been safely stored. Lohse was ordered by Robert Scholz to protect Nazi art holdings and records from destruction, and to "turn them over to the American authorities at such time as Füssen [a nearby town] might be occupied."

Facing a possible death sentence for crimes witnessed in Paris by Rose Valland (and others), Lohse underwent a two-month interrogation, during which he shared a cell with two other notorious Nazi art looters, Karl Haberstock and Walter Hofer. The suicide of Baron Kurt von Behr proved to be a godsend to Lohse, permitting him to blame the systematic confiscation of French art collections on his former ERR chief in Paris. Lohse cooperated with American occupiers and repeatedly traded his encyclopedic knowledge of the Nazi art trade for further leniency. He testified, for example, in the Nuremberg trials in November 1945, providing evidence against his superiors and professing a personal distaste for activities of the ERR. Lohse was described, however, as "elusive" and known to lie.

After being transferred from American to French custody in 1948, the American ALIU investigators James S. Plaut, S. Lane Faison and Theodore Rouseau, intervened repeatedly to help free Lohse, to whom Plaut wrote, in June 1948, "My friends, Rousseaux and Faison, and I have all been working in your interest for some time and you have been very much in our thoughts We would like to do anything in our power to facilitate your release and we all wish that you could have had your freedom long before now." They also wrote to Lohse's lawyer, Albert Naud, to help him with Lohse's defence at the French trial, and Plaut and Rousseau wrote to Albert Henraux, in charge of the French Commission for Art Recovery to try convince him to intervene on Lohse's behalf, to which Henraux responded, "If you continue to want to intervene on behalf of one of the greatest pillagers of France's artistic patrimony and one who is most responsible for its impoverishment, you will have to follow the usual legal procedures."

Lohse was acquitted in a 1950 military tribunal in Paris and never conceded responsibility for art looting, admitting only to possessing furniture stolen from deported Jewish families, which Lohse had abandoned in his Paris apartment.

== Later years ==
Lohse found refuge in the home of another Nazi art dealer, Benno Griebert, whose son Peter became a close contact and business partner. Although the conditions of Lohse's release forbade him ever to work again as an art dealer, German officials quietly allowed Lohse to resume his profession in Bavaria (Munich) in the early 1950s. An unrepentant Nazi, Lohse was among several former Nazi art dealers who, after the war, pressed their own restitution claims for work they claimed to have lost during the years of conflict. Lohse's collection of Dutch old masters and Expressionist paintings was said to be valued in the "millions".

According to the historian Jonathan Petropoulos, Lohse maintained contact with former Monuments Man Theodore Rousseau, a curator at the Metropolitan Museum of Art, exchanging letters and seeing him in New York and in Europe on multiple occasions. Lohse's death in March 2007 was little-noticed, apparently because few realised one of the Third Reich's most notorious art looters was still alive.

== Secret vault ==
In May 2007, the seizure of a secret bank vault registered to Schönart Anstalt (under Lohse's control since 1978) at the Zurich Cantonal Bank turned up a valuable Camille Pissarro painting stolen by the Gestapo from a prominent Jewish publisher in Vienna in 1938, as well as paintings of uncertain provenance by Monet and Renoir. According to U.S. historian and looted art expert Jonathan Petropoulos, who "got to know [Lohse] well" in the last decade of his life, the existence of the vault makes it "not only possible, but likely" that Lohse had sold looted artworks in recent decades. Painted in 1903 and the first in Pissarro's last series of Paris city views, "Le Quai Malaquais, Printemps" was restituted later in 2007 by a Liechtenstein court to an heir of Gottfried Bermann Fischer, and ultimately auctioned in November 2009 for $1,850,000 ($2,154,000 with Christie's premium) under its new title, "Le Quai Malaquais et l'Institut".

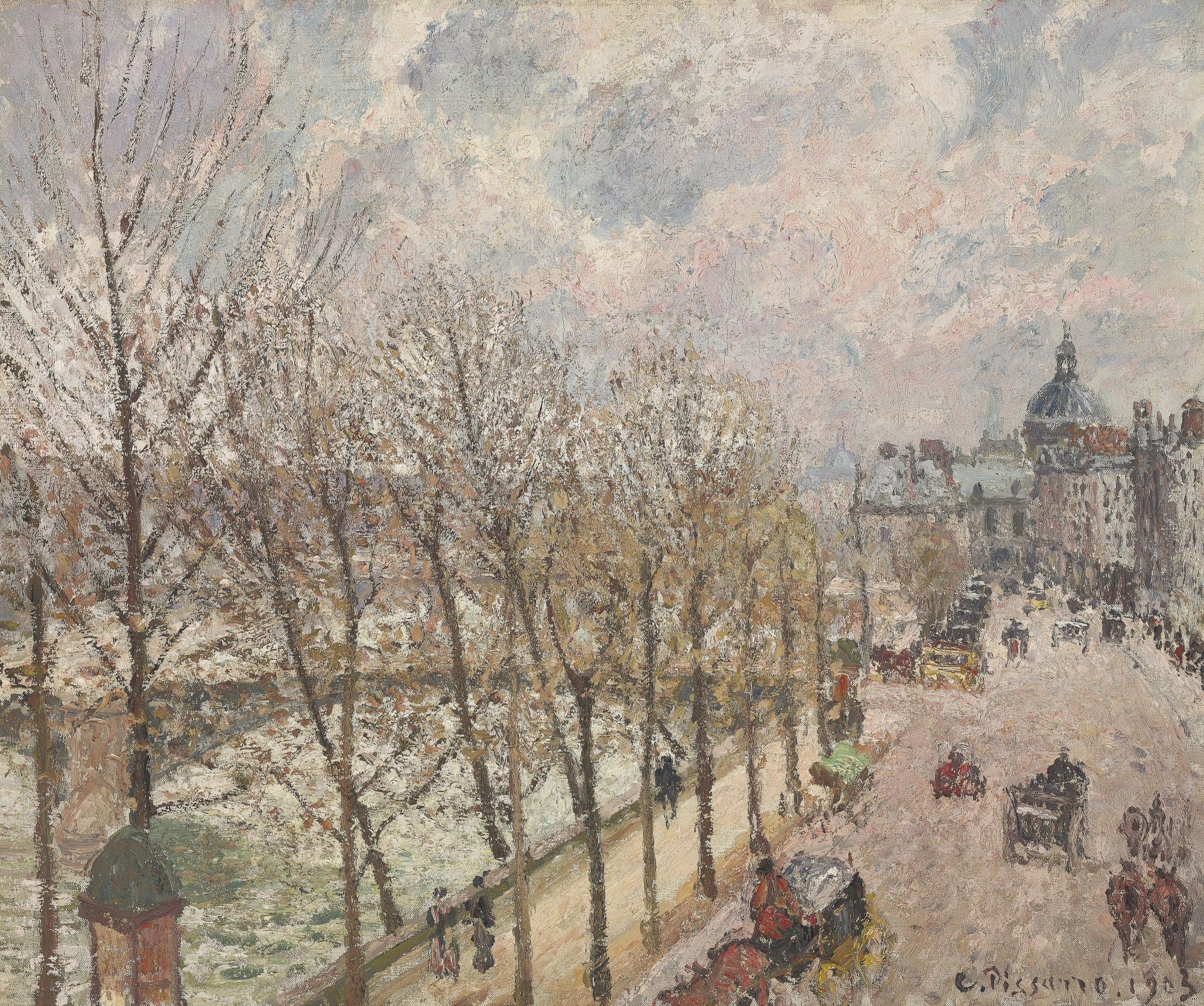
The Pissarro painting: Quai Malaquais, from 1903

European prosecutors seized documents confirming that at least 14 paintings left Lohse's safe since 1983, including paintings by Corot and Sisley as well as-yet-unnamed works by Dürer and Kokoschka, among others. An international investigation of Lohse's activities (as well as possible collusion with galleries and auction houses) was opened as of 2006 and currently involves three European countries: Germany, Switzerland, and Liechtenstein. According to widely accepted estimates, of the 600,000 artworks looted by the Nazis in World War II, up to 100,000 were destroyed or are still missing.

== See also ==
- Art theft and looting during World War II
- Hildebrand Gurlitt

== Bibliography ==
- Hector Feliciano. The Lost Museum: The Nazi Conspiracy to Steal the World's Greatest Works of Art. New York: Basic Books, 1997. ISBN 978-0465041947
- Esther Tisa Francini, Anja Heuss, Georg Kreis. Fluchtgut – Raubgut. Der Transfer von Kulturgütern in und über die Schweiz 1933–1945 und die Frage der Restitution. Zürich 2001.
- Günther Haase. Die Kunstsammlung des Reichsmarschalls Hermann Göring. Eine Dokumentation. Berlin 2000.
- Günther Haase. Kunstraub und Kunstschutz. Eine Dokumentation. Hildesheim 1991.
- Anja Heuß. Kunst- und Kulturgutraub. Eine vergleichende Studie zur Besatzungspolitik der Nationalsozialisten in Frankreich und der Sowjetunion. Heidelberg 2000.
- Stefan Koldehoff. Die Bilder sind unter uns: Das Geschäft mit der NS-Raubkunst. Frankfurt 2009, ISBN 978-3-8218-5844-9.
- Jacob Kurz. Kunstraub in Europa 1938–1945. Hamburg 1989.
- Michael J. Kurtz. America and the Return of Nazi Contraband: The Recovery of Europe's Cultural Treasures. New York: Cambridge University Press, 2006. ISBN 9780521849821
- Hanns Christian Löhr. Der Eiserne Sammler. Die Kollektion Hermann Göring – Kunst und Korruption im "Dritten Reich". Berlin 2009, ISBN 978-3-7861-2601-0.
- Hanns Christian Löhr. Kunst als Waffe – Der Einsatzstab Reichsleiter Rosenberg, Ideologie und Kunstraub im "Dritten Reich", Berlin 2018, ISBN 978-3-7861-2806-9.
- Lynn H. Nicholas. The Rape of Europa: The Fate of Europe's Treasures in the Third Reich and the Second World War. New York: Knopf, 1994. ISBN 978-0679400691
- Jonathan Petropoulos. Göring's Man In Paris: The Story of a Nazi Art Plunderer and His World. New Haven: Yale University Press, 2021. ISBN 9780300251920
- Jonathan Petropoulos. The Art World in Nazi Germany: Choices, Rationalization and Justice. Edited Jonathan Huener and Francis R. Nicosia in "The Arts in Nazi Germany: Continuity, Conformity, Change". University of Vermont 2007.
- Jonathan Petropoulos. The Faustian Bargain. The Art World in Germany. London: Oxford University Press, 2000. ISBN 9780195129649
- Jonathan Petropoulos. Art as Politics in the Third Reich. Chapel Hill: University of North Carolina Press, 1996. ISBN 978-0-8078-4809-8
- Jonathan Petropoulos. Kunstraub. Warum es wichtig ist, die Biographien der Kunstsachverständigen im Dritten Reich zu verstehen. In Die Politische Ökonomie des Holocausts. Zur wirtschaftlichen Logik von Verfolgung und "Wiedergutmachung". München: Oldenbourg, 2001. ISBN 978-3486565553
- Gunnar Schnabel, Monika Tatzkow. Nazi Looted Art. Handbuch Kunstrestitution weltweit. Berlin 2007.
- Matila Simon. The Battle of the Louvre. The Struggle to Save French Art in World War II. New York: Hawthorne, 1971. ISBN 9780615990392
- Elizabeth Simpson (ed.). The Spoils of War – World War II and Its Aftermath: The Loss, Reappearance, and Recovery of Cultural Property. Conf. proc. New York: Abrahms, 1997. ISBN 978-0810944695
- Julius H. Schoeps, Anna-Dorothea Ludewig. Eine Debatte ohne Ende? Raubkunst und Restitution im deutschsprachigen Raum. Berlin 2007, ISBN 978-3-86650-641-1.
- Nina Siegal. "At Lunch, Nazi Thief Unspools His Deeds." New York Times 170, no. 58,942 (8 January 2021): page C3.
