= A. S. Drey =

A. S. Drey was a company founded in Munich in the 1860s by Aaron S. Drey. In 1881, Drey expanded the firm to include his only son Siegfried (d. 1935) and his son-in-law Adolf Stern (1840–1931). Their sons in turn joined the business: Friedrich and Ludwig Stern and Paul and Francis Drey. In 1913 A.S. Drey moved into a building designed by Gabriel von Seidl on the Maximiliansplatz in Munich. The firm expanded to branches in the US and the UK, where the London branch was managed by Francis Drey. When the Nazis came to power in 1933, the Drey family was persecuted under Adolf Hitler's anti-Jewish laws, and their business was Aryanized by the German art dealer Walter Bornheim, who operated the business under the name of the Galerie für Alte Kunst.

== History ==
Kunsthaus A.S. Drey was established in 1837 by Aron Siegfried Drey (1813–1891). Initially based in Würzburg, it moved to Munich in 1854 becoming purveyor to the Bavarian royal house. Drey's son Siegfried (1859–1936) and son-in-law Adolf Stern (1882–1932) took over management of the firm, expanding to Paris, New York, London, Brussels and The Hague. In 1912 the Dreys moved to a house in Munich designed by Gabriel von Seidl. Opened at Maximiliansplatz 7, (now Max-Joseph-Straße 2) the house also served as the firm's headquarters.

Adolf Stern died in 1932, and his sons Fritz Stern (1888–1970) and Ludwig Stern (1882–1939) together with Siegfried's sons Paul Drey (1884–1953) and Franz Drey (1886–1952) became partners in A. S. Drey. Siegfried Drey owned 26.5%, Paul and Franz Drey 19.25% each and Fritz and Ludwig Stern 17.5% each. Siegfried Drey, a was the director. Siegfried Drey had been a Kommerzienrat (Counsellor of Commerce) since 1910 and in 1926 he was promoted to Geheime Kommerzienrat (Privy Counsellor of Commerce). He was also a commercial court judge and president of the Verband des Deutschen Kunst- und Antiquitätenhandels e.V (German Art and Antiques Trade Association).

== Nazi era ==
When the Nazis came to power in 1933, the Drey family was persecuted under Adolf Hitler's anti-Jewish laws and their business was targeted for boycotts and harassment. By 1935, most of the family had emigrated to the UK and USA, where the firm operated in New York. Discriminatory tax impositions specifically aimed at Jews forced the remaining family members in Germany to liquidate their assets on 17 June 1936 at the Graupe auction house in Berlin. The Maximilianplatz building was Aryanized by Walter Bornheim, who operated the business under the name of the Galerie für Alte Kunst.

== Legacy and restitution claims ==
Artworks from A. S. Drey are currently housed at the National Gallery of Art in Washington, D.C., the Cleveland Museum of Art and many other museums in the United States and Europe.

The heirs of A. S. Drey filed claims for restitution. In 2014 the British Library restituted to the heirs the Bicchena panel attributed to Guidoccio Cozzarelli following the recommendation of the UK's Spoliation Advisory Panel.

In 2020 the Uffizi gallery in Florence, Italy, restituted a renaissance statue by Andrea della Robbia that had been found in the home of Hermann Göring and given to the Italian government in 1954.

In 2021, the Bavarian State Painting Collections in Munich restituted a Nazi-looted painting created in 1480 work, recognizing that it had been sold off as a result of Nazi persecution.

In 2023, the Dutch Restitutions Committee issued an opinion concerning a Byzantine ivory relief entitled Hodegetria or Virgin and Child. The Committee recommended that the ivory be restituted to the Drey heirs.

== Literature and readings ==
Drey/Stern : a personal history of A.S. Drey, the art firm in Munich, Germany and members of the Drey and Stern families

== See also ==
- Aryanization
- Nazi plunder
- The Holocaust
- List of claims for restitution for Nazi-looted art
