= Art Looting Investigation Unit =

US government unit during World War II

The Art Looting Investigation Unit (ALIU) was an American special intelligence unit during World War II whose mission was to gather information and write reports about Nazi art looting networks. It was set up by the Office of Strategic Services (OSS). Composed of only a few handpicked men, the small unit conducted interrogations and investigations in Europe starting in 1944 and focusing mainly on Germany, France, the Netherlands, Switzerland, Italy, Spain and Portugal. Their mission was different from but related to that of the Monuments Men. After the war, the reports the ALIU wrote were marked secret and forgotten for many years until the late 1990s when they began to be declassified . The reports remain an important source for research into the history of the origin of works of art (provenance research) and for the restitution of looted art from the Nazi era.

== Creation of the ALIU ==
Justice Owen J. Roberts, who was chairman of the American Commission for the Protection and Salvage of Artistic and Historic Monuments in War Areas (the Roberts Commissions), initiated the creation of the ALIU to support both the Roberts Commission and the Monuments Men in the immense task of recovering and restituting artworks looted by the Nazis. Administratively the ALIU belonged to the Office of Strategic Services (OSS), which was headed by Brig. Gen. William J. Donovan. It was officially authorized on November 21, 1944. Its official mission was described as follows:

It will be the primary mission of the Art Looting Investigation Unit to collect and disseminate such information bearing on the looting, confiscation and transfer by the enemy of art properties in Europe, and on individuals or organizations involved in such operations or transactions, as will be of direct aid to the United States agencies empowered to effect restitution of such properties and prosecution of war criminals.

The mission of the ALIU intersected with that of other intelligence and military organisations that tracked Nazi assets and money and asset laundering networks of the Third Reich and its client states.

== ALIU members ==
The director of the Metropolitan Museum of Art, Francis Henry Taylor, was requested by the Roberts Commission to select art professionals to staff the Art Looting Investigation Unit. Taylor recruited Theodore Rousseau, S. Lane Faison, James Plaut, Charles Sawyer, and John Phillips. Otto Wittmann Jr. joined later. James S. Plaut was named director. The ALIU also worked closely with local professionals, most notably Dutch Army Intelligence officer Captain Jan Vlug, who would author the Vlug Report. Rousseau was responsible for investigating the Goering Collection. Faison was in charge of investigating Hitler's planned Fuhremuseum at Linz, Austria and Plaut investigated the Nazi looting organisation known as the Einsatzstab Reichsleiter Rosenberg (ERR), the Nazi looting organization.

The ALIU also helped investigate war crimes for prosecution. From June 10, 1945, until the spring of 1946, the ALIU conducted interrogations at Alt Aussee, Austria.

== ALIU reports ==
The ALIU compiled information on over 2,000 individuals believed to have participated in art looting and drafted three sets of reports: Detailed Intelligence Reports (DIR), Consolidated Interrogation Reports (CIR), and Final Report which contained a list of "Red Flag" names with brief summaries, accompanied by an index. The authors of the reports were James Plaut, Theodore Rousseau, Lane Faison, Jan Vlug (Vlug report), Otto Wittmann Jr. and Bernard Taper.

=== Detailed Intelligence Reports ===
  - No. 1 Heinrich Hoffman, July 1945 (6 pp)
  - No. 2 Ernst Buchner, July 1945 (34 pp)
  - No. 3 Robert Scholz, August 1945 (5 pp)
  - No. 4 Gustav Rochlitz, August 1945 (13 pp)
  - No. 5 Gunther Schiedlausky, August 1945 (4 pp)
  - No. 6 Bruno Lohse, August 1945 (15 pp)
  - No. 7 Gisela Limberger, September 1945 (5 pp)
  - No. 9 Walter Andreas Hofer, September 1945 (20 pp)
  - No. 10 Karl Kress, August 1945 (3 pp)
  - No. 11 Walter Bornheim, September 1945 (ca. 30 pp)
  - No. 12 Herman Voss, September 1945 (28 pp)
  - No. 13 Karl Haberstock, May 1946 (5 pp)

=== Consolidated Interrogation Reports (CIR). ===
- No. 1 Activity of The Einsatzstab Rosenberg in France, August 1945 (57 pp and ca. 50 pp of appendices)
- No. 2 The Goering Collection, September 1945 (176 pp and ca. 150 pp of appendices)
- No. 4 Linz: Hitler's Museum and Library, December 1945 (87 pp and ca. 200 pp of appendices)

=== Final Report ===
The Final Report contains an index of about one thousand "Red Flag Names". It was classified secret until the late 20th century. It is now available both online and on NARA Microfilm Publications M1782, Roll 1, and M1944, Roll 22.

DIRs are available on NARA Microfilm Publications M1782, Roll 1, and M1944, Roll 94 or in a digital form.

CIRs are available on NARA Microfilm Publications M1782, Roll 1, and M1944, Rolls 94–95. M1944 also includes records relating to the American Commission for the Protection and Salvage of Artistic and Historic Monuments in War Areas (The Roberts Commission) 1943–1946.

== Unpublished reports ==
According to the National Archives, DIR No. 8 on Kajetan Muehlmann was not issued. DIR No.14 on the activities of Maria Dietrich was planned. It was not issued, but a full accounting of her activities was incorporated into Consolidated Interrogation Report No. 4. Also, a DIR No. 15 on Rose Bauer, Muehlmann's secretary, was contemplated but not issued. CIR No. 3 on German methods of acquisition was planned but not issued. The Vlug report on Nazi looting in the Netherlands was also not issued.

== Literature ==
- Tanja Bernsau: Spione für den Kulturgüterschutz – Die Art Looting Investigation Unit, Akademiker-Verlag, 2016, ISBN 978-3-330-51011-1.
- Art Looting Investigation Unit: ALIU Reports 1945-1946, National Archives (NARA) Fold3 WWII OSS Art Looting Investigation Reports, https://www.fold3.com/browse/114/hvMxROzkd.

== See also ==
- Aryanization
- Bruno Lohse
- Monuments, Fine Arts, and Archives program
- Nazi looting of artworks by Vincent van Gogh
- Operation Safehaven (1944–1948)
- E.R.R. (Reichsleiter Rosenberg Taskforce)
