= Ernst Buchner =

Ernst Buchner may refer to:

- Ernst Büchner (1850–1924), German chemist
- Ernst Buchner (curator) (1892–1962), German arts administrator
- Hans Ernst August Buchner (1850–1902), German bacteriologist
