= Nazi plunder =

Nazi looting during World War II

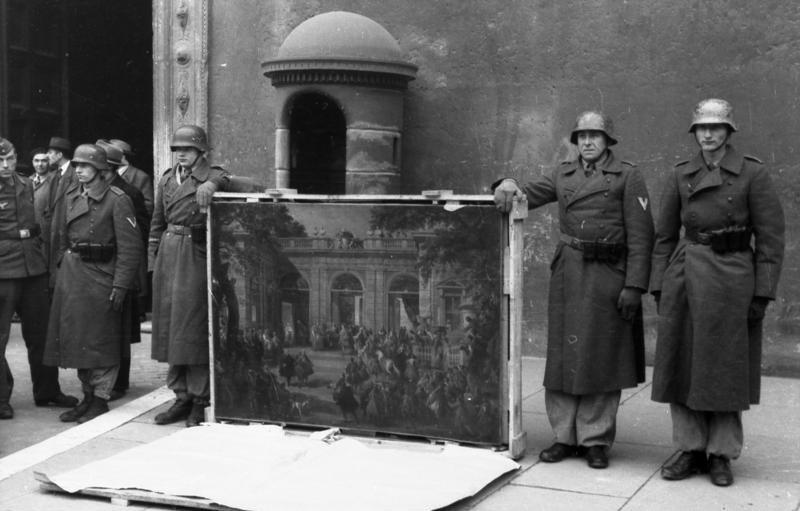
German soldiers in front of Palazzo Venezia in Rome in 1944 with a painting taken from the Naples National Archaeological Museum, Carlo III di Borbone che visita il papa Benedetto XIV nella coffee-house del Quirinale a Roma by Giovanni Paolo Panini

Nazi authorities systematically plundered art and valuables from occupied European countries. In Nazi Germany, the looting of Jewish property was a key part of the Holocaust. Nazis also plundered occupied countries, sometimes with direct seizures, and sometimes under the guise of protecting art through Kunstschutz units. In addition to gold, silver, and currency, cultural items of great significance were stolen, including paintings, ceramics, books, and religious treasures.

Many of the artworks looted by the Nazis were recovered by the Allies' Monuments, Fine Arts, and Archives program (MFAA, also known as the Monuments Men and Women), following the war; however many of them are still missing or were returned to countries but not to their original owners. An international effort to identify Nazi plunder which still remains unaccounted for is underway, with the ultimate aim of returning the items to their rightful owners, their families, or their respective countries.

== Background ==
Jean Metzinger, 1913, En Canot (Im Boot), oil on canvas, 146 cm × 114 cm (57 in × 45 in), exhibited at Moderni Umeni, S.V.U. Mánes, Prague, 1914, acquired in 1916 by Georg Muche at the Galerie Der Sturm, confiscated by the Nazis c. 1936, displayed at the Degenerate Art show in Munich, and missing ever since

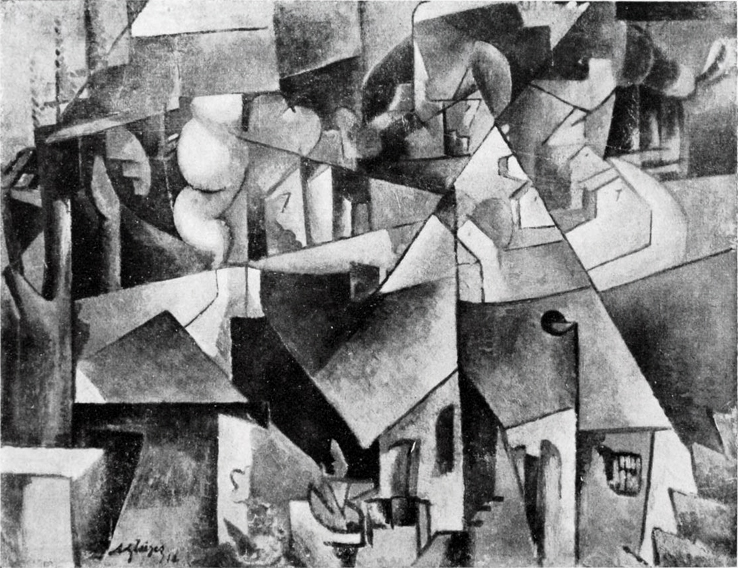
Albert Gleizes, 1912, Landschaft bei Paris, Paysage près de Paris, Paysage de Courbevoie, oil on canvas, 72.8 cm × 87.1 cm (28.7 in × 34.3 in), missing from Hannover since 1937

Adolf Hitler, an unsuccessful artist denied admission to the Vienna Academy of Fine Arts, thought of himself as a connoisseur of the arts, and in Mein Kampf, he ferociously attacked modern art as degenerate. He considered Cubism, Futurism, and Dadaism products of a decadent 20th-century society. When Hitler became chancellor of Germany in 1933, he enforced his aesthetics. The Nazis favored classical portraits and landscapes by Old Masters, particularly those of Germanic origin. Modern art was dubbed degenerate art by the Third Reich. All such art found in Germany's state museums was sold or destroyed. With the funds raised, the Führer's objective was to establish a European Art Museum in Linz. Other Nazi dignitaries like Reichsmarschall Hermann Göring and Foreign Affairs minister Joachim von Ribbentrop, also took advantage of German military conquests to grow their private art collections.

== Plunder of Jews ==
The systematic dispossession of Jewish people and the transfer of their homes, businesses, artworks, financial assets, musical instruments, books, and even home furnishings to the Reich was an integral component of the Holocaust. In every country controlled by Nazis, Jews were stripped of their assets through a wide array of mechanisms and Nazi looting organizations.

== Public auctions and private sales in Switzerland ==
The most notorious auction of Nazi looted art was the "degenerate art" auction organized by Theodor Fischer on 30 June 1939 at the Grand Hotel National in Lucerne, Switzerland. The artworks on offer had been deaccessioned from German museums by the Nazis, yet many well known art dealers participated alongside proxies for major collectors and museums. In addition to public auctions, there were many private sales by art dealers. The Commission for Art Recovery has characterized Switzerland as "a magnet" for assets from the rise of Hitler until the end of World War II. Researching and documenting Switzerland's role "as an art-dealing centre and conduit for cultural assets in the Nazi period and in the immediate post-war period" was one of the missions of the Bergier Commission, under the directorship of Professor Georg Kreis.

== Nazi looting organizations ==
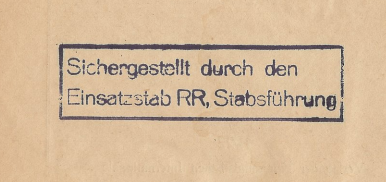
Seal of the "Einsatzstab Reichsleiter Rosenberg", used from 1941 to 1944 to mark seized documents by the German occupation troops

The Nazis plundered cultural property from Germany and every occupied territory, targeting Jewish property in particular in a systematic manner with organizations specifically created for the purpose, to determine which public and private collections were most valuable. Some were earmarked for Hitler's never realized Führermuseum, some went to other high-ranking officials such as Hermann Göring, and others were traded to fund Nazi activities.

In 1940, an organization known as the Einsatzstab Reichsleiter Rosenberg für die Besetzten Gebiete (Reichsleiter Rosenberg Taskforce), or ERR, was formed, headed for Alfred Rosenberg by Gerhard Utikal. The first operating unit, the western branch for France, Belgium, and the Netherlands, called the Dienststelle Westen (Western Agency), was located in Paris. The chief of this Dienststelle was Kurt von Behr. Its original purpose was to collect Jewish and Freemasonic books and documents, either for destruction or for removal to Germany for further "study". However, late in 1940, Hermann Göring, who in fact controlled the ERR, issued an order that effectively changed the mission of the ERR, mandating it to seize "Jewish" art collections and other objects. The war loot had to be collected in a central place in Paris, the Museum Jeu de Paume. At this collection point worked art historians and other personnel who inventoried the loot before sending it to Germany. Göring also commanded that the loot would first be divided between Hitler and himself. Hitler later ordered that all confiscated works of art were to be made directly available to him. From the end of 1940 to the end of 1942, Göring traveled 20 times to Paris. In the Jeu de Paume museum, art dealer Bruno Lohse staged 20 expositions of the newly looted art objects, especially for Göring, from which Göring selected at least 594 pieces for his own collection. Göring made Lohse his liaison-officer and installed him in the ERR in March 1941 as the deputy leader of this unit. Items which Hitler and Göring did not want were made available to other Nazi leaders. Under Rosenberg and Göring's leadership, the ERR seized 21,903 art objects from German-occupied countries.

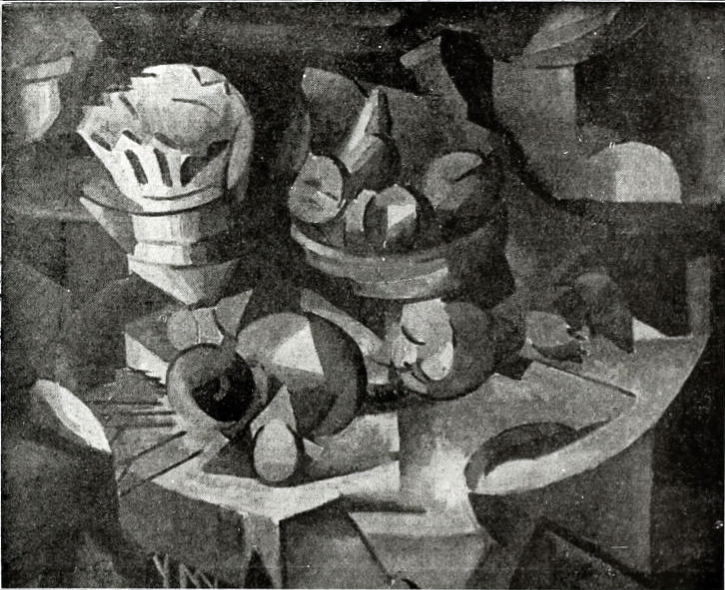
Albert Gleizes, 1911, Stilleben, Nature Morte, Der Sturm postcard, Sammlung Walden, Berlin. Collection Paul Citroen, sold 1928 to Kunstausstellung Der Sturm, requisition by the Nazis in 1937, and missing since

Other Nazi looting organizations included the Führermuseum, the organization run by the art historian Hans Posse, which was particularly in charge of assembling the works for the Führermuseum, the Dienststelle Mühlmann, operated by Kajetan Mühlmann which operated primarily in the Netherlands and in Belgium, and a Sonderkommando Kuensberg connected to the minister of foreign affairs Joachim von Ribbentrop, which operated first in France, then in Russia and North Africa. In Western Europe, with the advancing German troops, were elements of the "von Ribbentrop Battalion", named after Joachim von Ribbentrop. These men were responsible for entering private and institutional libraries in the occupied countries and removing any materials of interest to the Germans, especially items of scientific, technical, or other informational value.

Art collections from prominent Jewish families, including the Rothschilds, the Rosenbergs, the Wildensteins, and the Schloss Family, were the targets of confiscations because of their significant value. Also, Jewish art dealers sold art to German organizations—often under duress, e.g., the art dealerships of Jacques Goudstikker, Benjamin and Nathan Katz, and Kurt Walter Bachstitz. Also, non-Jewish art dealers sold art to the Germans, e.g., the art dealers De Boer and Hoogendijk in the Netherlands.

By the end of the war, the Third Reich amassed hundreds of thousands of cultural objects.

== Art Looting Investigation Unit ==
On 21 November 1944, at the request of Owen Roberts, William J. Donovan created the Art Looting Investigation Unit (ALIU) within the OSS to collect information on the looting, confiscation, and transfer of cultural objects by Nazi Germany, its allies and the various individuals and organizations involved; to prosecute war criminals and to restitute property. The ALIU compiled information on individuals believed to have participated in art looting, identifying a group of key suspects for capture and interrogation about their roles in carrying out Nazi policy. Interrogations were conducted in Bad Aussee, Austria.

=== ALIU reports and index ===
The ALIU Reports detail the networks of Nazi officials, art dealers, and individuals involved in Hitler's policy of spoliation of Jews in Nazi-occupied Europe. The ALIU's final report included 175 pages divided into three parts: Detailed Interrogation Reports (DIRs), which focused individuals who played pivotal roles in German spoliation; Consolidated Interrogations Reports (CIRs); and a "Red Flag list" of people involved in Nazi spoliation. The ALIU Reports form one of the key records in the US Government Archives of Nazi Era Assets.

==== Detailed Intelligence Reports (DIR) ====
The first group of reports detailing the networks and relations between art dealers and other agents employed by Hitler, Göring, and Rosenberg are organized by name: Heinrich Hoffmann, Ernst Buchner, Gustav Rochlitz, Gunter Schiedlausky, Bruno Lohse, Gisela Limberger, Walter Andreas Hofer, Karl Kress, Walter Bornheim, Hermann Voss, and Karl Haberstock.

==== Consolidated Interrogation Reports (CIR) ====
A second set of reports detail the art looting activities of Göring (The Goering Collection), the art looting activities of the Einsatzstab Reichsleiter Rosenberg (ERR), and Hitler's Linz Museum.

==== ALIU List of Red Flag Names ====
The Art Looting Intelligence Unit published a list of "Red Flag Names", organizing them by country: Germany, France, Switzerland, the Netherlands, Belgium, Italy, Spain, Portugal, Sweden, and Luxembourg. Each name is followed by a description of the person's activities, their relations with other people in the spoliation network and, in many cases, information concerning their arrest or imprisonment by Allied forces.

== Soviet Union ==
After the initiation of Operation Barbarossa, Eastern Europe was relentlessly plundered by Nazi German forces. In 1943 alone, 9,000,000 tons of cereals, 2,000,000 t (2,000,000 long tons; 2,200,000 short tons) of fodder, 3,000,000 t (3,000,000 long tons; 3,300,000 short tons) of potatoes, and 662,000 t (652,000 long tons; 730,000 short tons) of meats were sent back to Germany. During the course of the German occupation, some 12 million pigs and 13 million sheep were seized by Nazi forces. The value of this plunder is estimated at 4 billion Reichsmarks. This relatively low number in comparison to the German-occupied nations of Western Europe can be attributed to the indiscriminate scorched-earth policy pursued by Nazi Germany and the retreating Soviet Union forces in the Eastern Front.

To investigate and estimate Nazi plunder in the USSR during 1941 through 1945, the Soviet State Extraordinary Commission for Ascertaining and Investigating the Crimes Committed by the German-Fascist Invaders and Their Accomplices was formed on 2 November 1942. During the Great Patriotic War and afterward, until 1991, the Commission collected materials on Nazi crimes in the USSR, including incidents of plunder. Immediately following the war, the Commission outlined damage in detail to 64 of the most valuable Soviet museums, out of 427 damaged ones. In the Russian SFSR, 173 museums were found to have been plundered by the Nazis, with looted items numbering in the hundreds of thousands.

After the dissolution of the USSR, the Government of the Russian Federation formed the State Commission for the Restitution of Cultural Valuables to replace the Soviet Commission. Experts from this Russian institution originally consulted the work of the Soviet Commission, yet continue to catalog artworks lost during the war museum by museum. As of 2008, lost artworks of 14 museums and the libraries of Voronezh Oblast, Kursk Oblast, Pskov Oblast, Rostov Oblast, Smolensk Oblast, Northern Caucasus, Gatchina, Peterhof Palace, Tsarskoye Selo (Pushkin), Novgorod, and Novgorod Oblast, as well as the bodies of the Russian State Archives and CPSU Archives, were cataloged in 15 volumes, all of which were made available online. They contain detailed information on 1,148,908 items of lost artworks. The total number of lost items is unknown so far, because cataloging work for other damaged Russian museums is ongoing.

Alfred Rosenberg commanded the so-called ERR, which was responsible for collecting art, books, and cultural objects from invaded countries, and also transferred their captured library collections back to Berlin during the retreat from Russia. "In their search for 'research materials' ERR teams and the Wehrmacht visited 375 archival institutions, 402 museums, 531 institutes, and 957 libraries in Eastern Europe alone". The ERR also operated in the early days of the blitzkrieg of the Low Countries. This caused some confusion about authority, priority, and the chain of command among the German Army, the von Ribbentrop Battalion and the Gestapo, and as a result of personal looting among the Army officers and troops. These ERR teams were, however, very effective. One account estimates that from the Soviet Union alone: "one hundred thousand geographical maps were taken on ideological grounds, for academic research, as means for political, geographical and economic information on Soviet cities and regions, or as collector's items".

== Poland ==
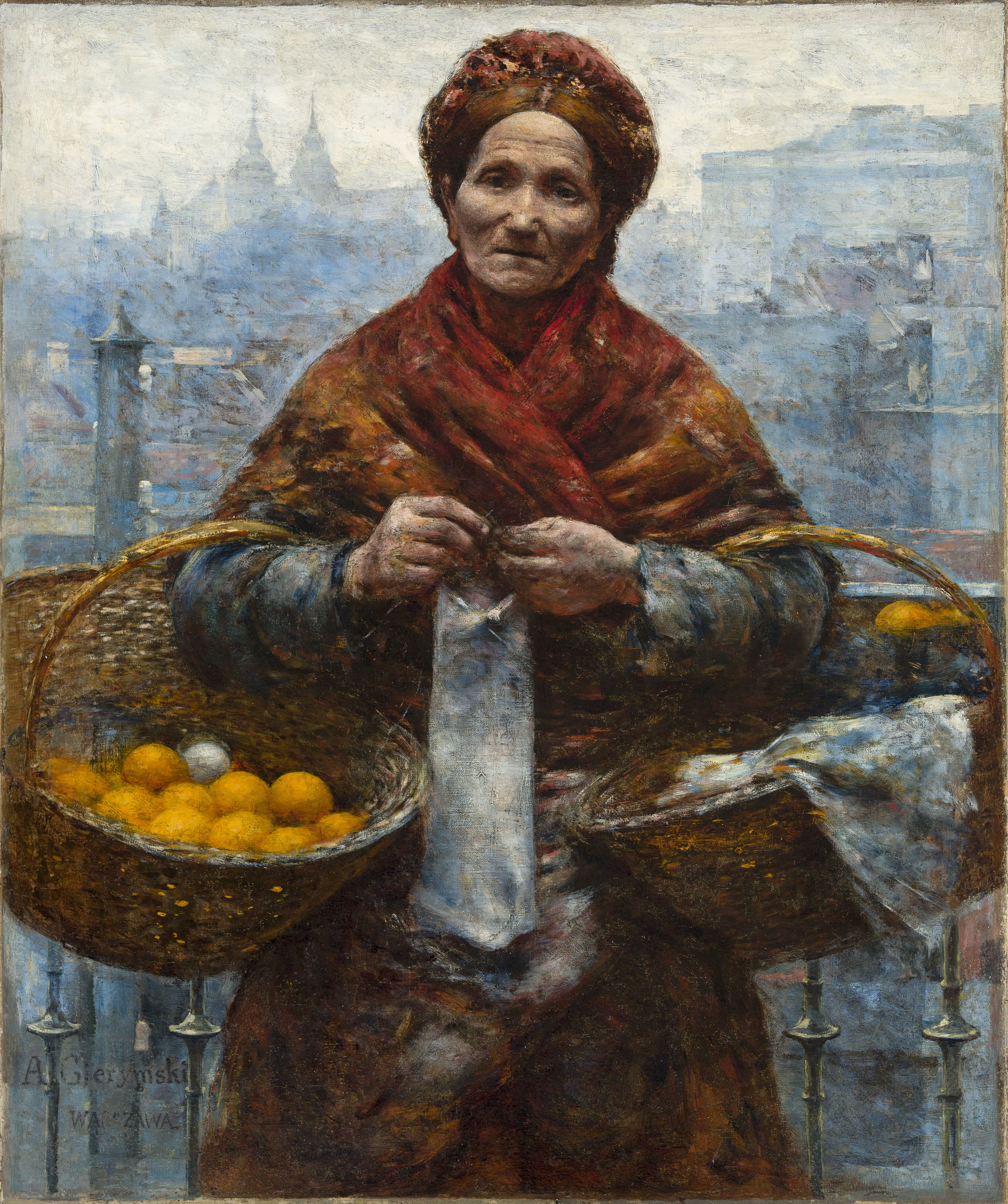
Aleksander Gierymski's Jewess with Oranges discovered on 26 November 2010 in an art auction in Buxtehude, Germany

After the occupation of Poland by German forces in September 1939, the Nazi regime committed genocide against Polish Jews and attempted to exterminate the Polish upper classes as well as its culture. Thousands of art objects were looted, as the Nazis systematically carried out a plan of looting prepared even before the start of hostilities. Twenty-five museums and many other facilities were destroyed. The total cost of German Nazi theft and destruction of Polish art is estimated at 20 billion dollars, or an estimated 43 percent of Polish cultural heritage; over 516,000 individual art pieces were looted, including 2,800 paintings by European painters; 11,000 paintings by Polish painters; 1,400 sculptures; 75,000 manuscripts; 25,000 maps; 90,000 books, including over 20,000 printed before 1800; and hundreds of thousands of other items of artistic and historical value. Germany still has much Polish material looted during World War II. For decades, there have been negotiations between Poland and Germany concerning the return of the looted Polish property.

== Austria ==
The Anschluss (joining) of Austria and Germany began on 12 March 1938. Looting of Jewish properties began immediately. Churches, monasteries, and museums were home to many pieces of art before the Nazis came but after, the majority of the artwork was taken. Ringstrasse, which was a residence for many people but as well as a community center, was confiscated and all of the art inside as well. Between the years 1943 and 1945, salt mines in Altaussee held the majority of Nazi looted art. Some from Austria and others from all around Europe. In 1944, around 4,700 pieces of art were then stored in the salt mines.

== Führermuseum ==
After Hitler became Chancellor, he made plans to transform his home city of Linz, Austria, into the Third Reich's capital city for the arts. Hitler hired architects to work from his own designs to build several galleries and museums, which would collectively be known as the Führermuseum. Hitler wanted to fill his museum with the greatest art treasures in the world and believed that most of the world's finest art belonged to Germany after having been looted during the Napoleonic and First World wars.

== Hermann Göring collection ==
The Hermann Göring collection, a personal collection of Reichsmarschall Hermann Göring, was another large collection, approximately 50% of which was property confiscated from the enemies of the Reich. Assembled in large measure by art dealer Bruno Lohse, Göring's adviser, and ERR representative in Paris, in 1945, the collection included over 2,000 individual pieces including more than 300 paintings. The US National Archives and Records Administration's Consolidated Interrogation Report No. 2 states that Göring never crudely looted, instead he always managed "to find a way of giving at least the appearance of honesty, by a token payment or promise thereof to the confiscation authorities. Although he and his agents never had an official connection with the German confiscation organizations, they nevertheless used them to the fullest extent possible."

== Nazi storage of looted objects ==
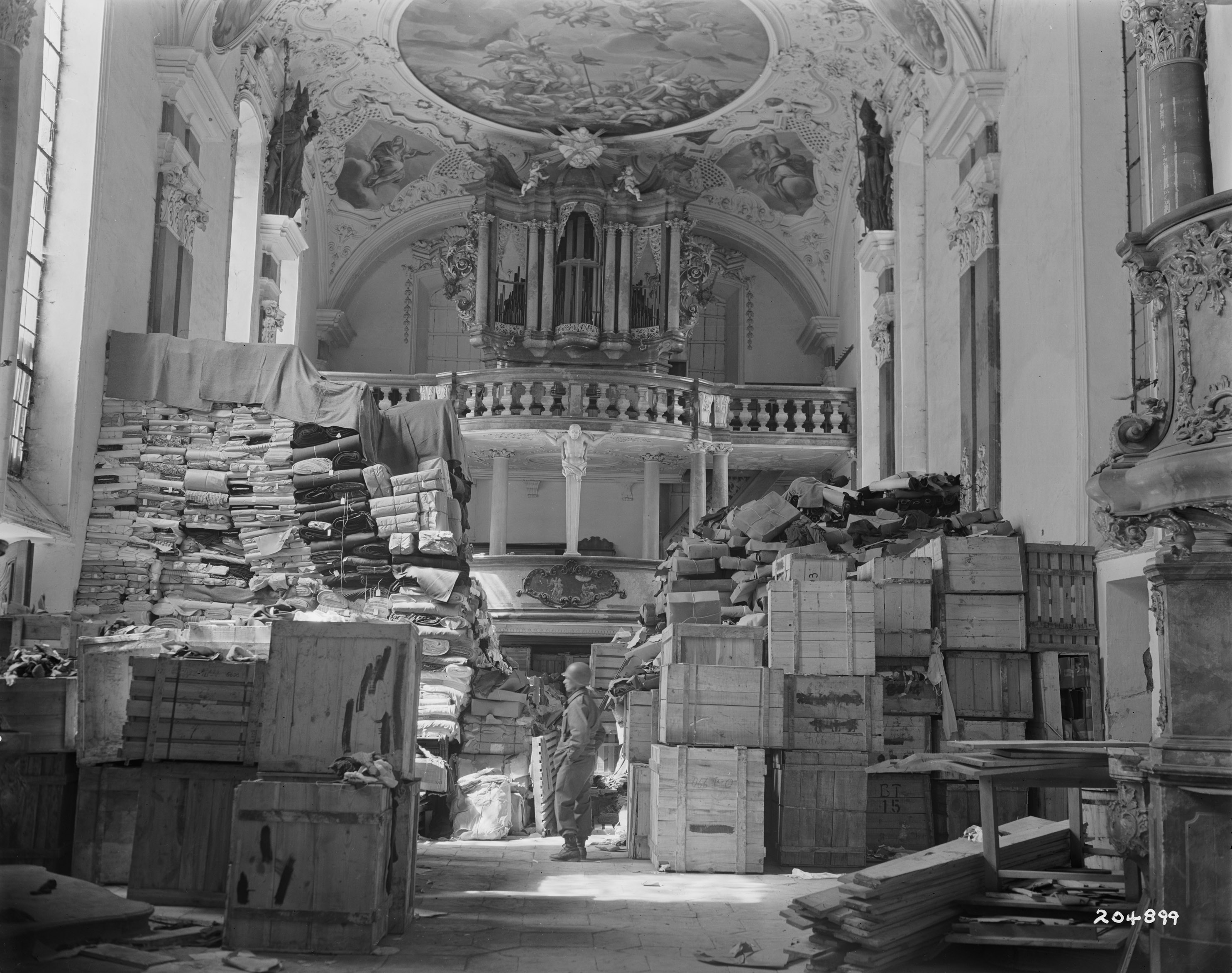
German loot stored at Schlosskirche Ellingen, Bavaria (April 1945)

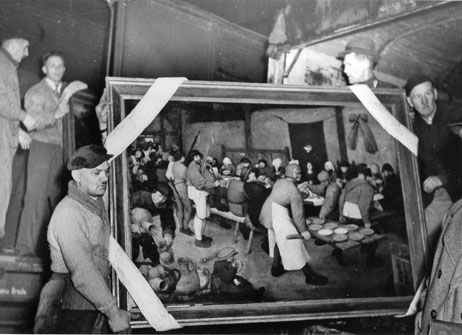
Pieter Bruegel the Elder painting Altaussee, Austria (April 1945)

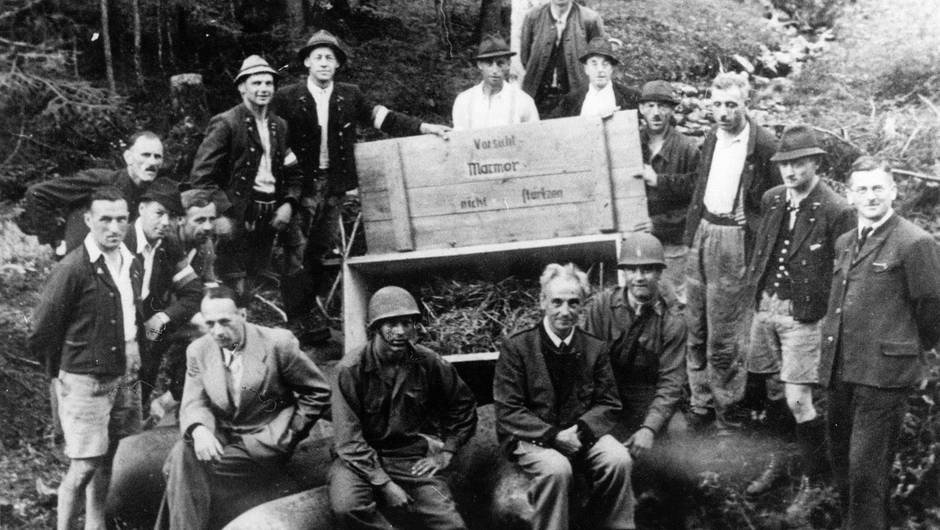
Altaussee, May 1945 after the removal of the eight 500-kilogram (1,100 lb) bombs at the Nazi stolen art repository

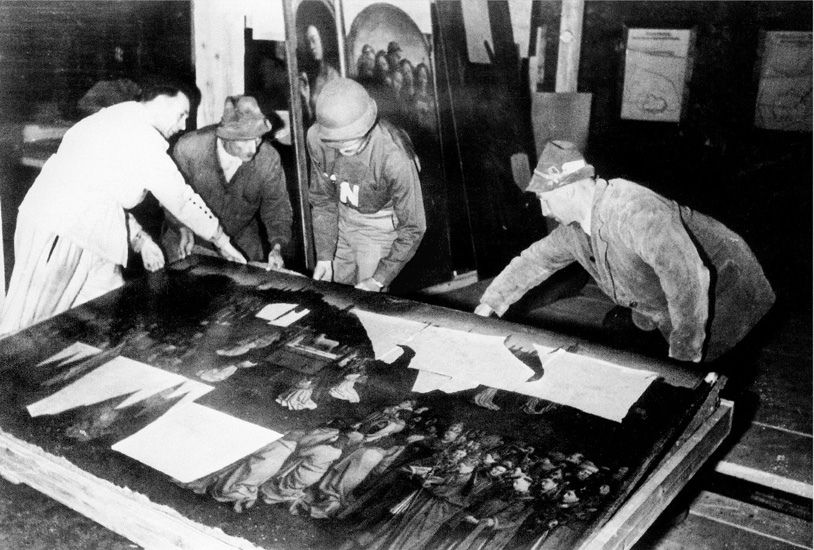
The Ghent Altarpiece during recovery from the Altaussee salt mine at the end of World War II

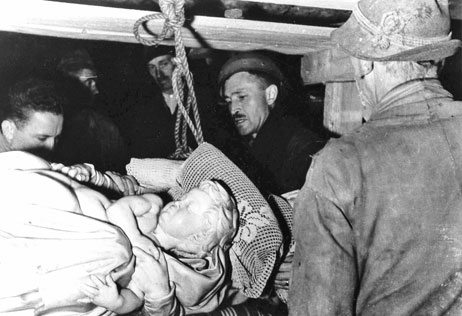
The Madonna of Bruges during recovery from the Altaussee salt mine, 1945

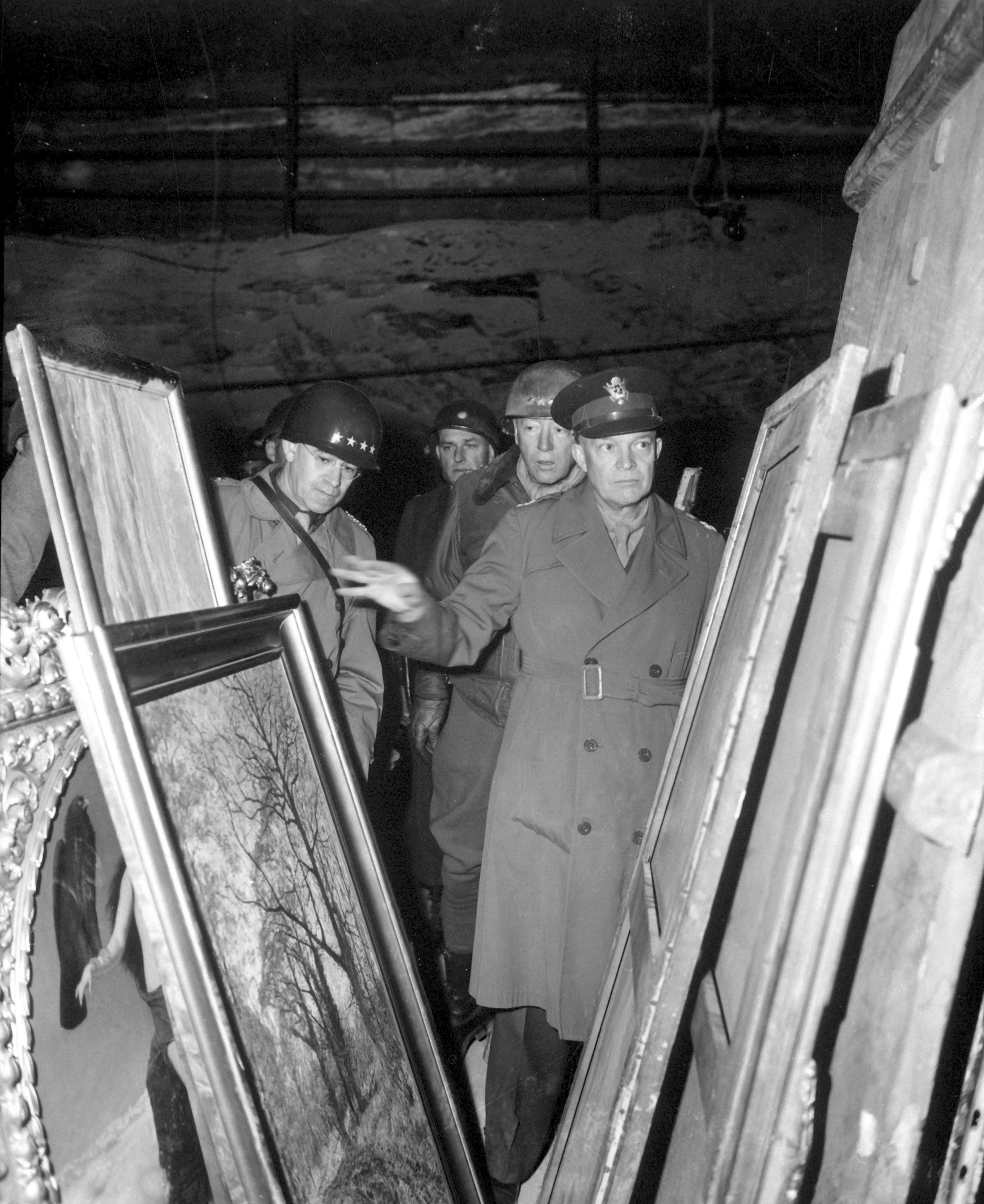
Dwight D. Eisenhower (right) inspects stolen artwork in a salt mine in Merkers, accompanied by Omar Bradley (left) and George S. Patton (center).

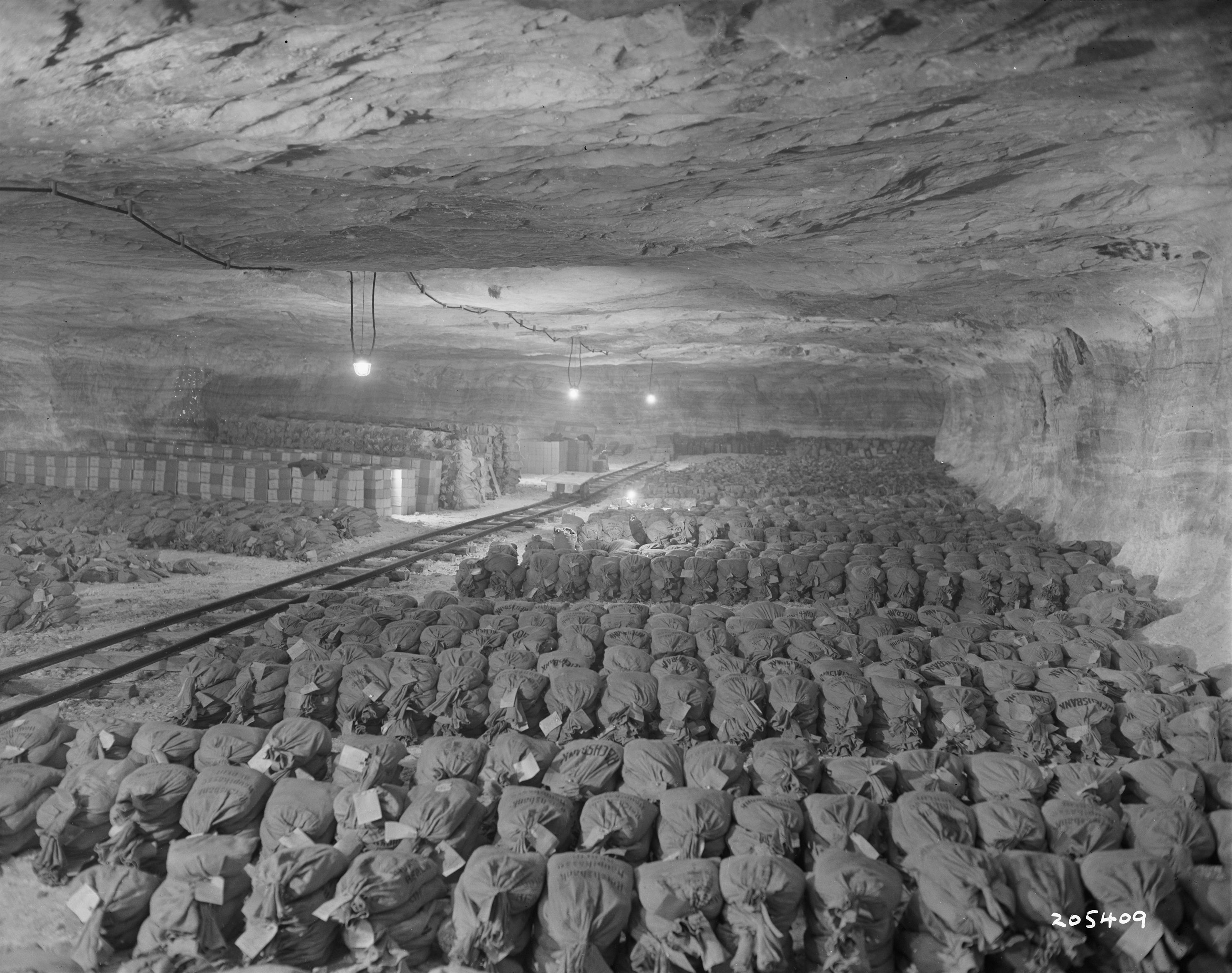
Nazi gold in Merkers Salt Mine

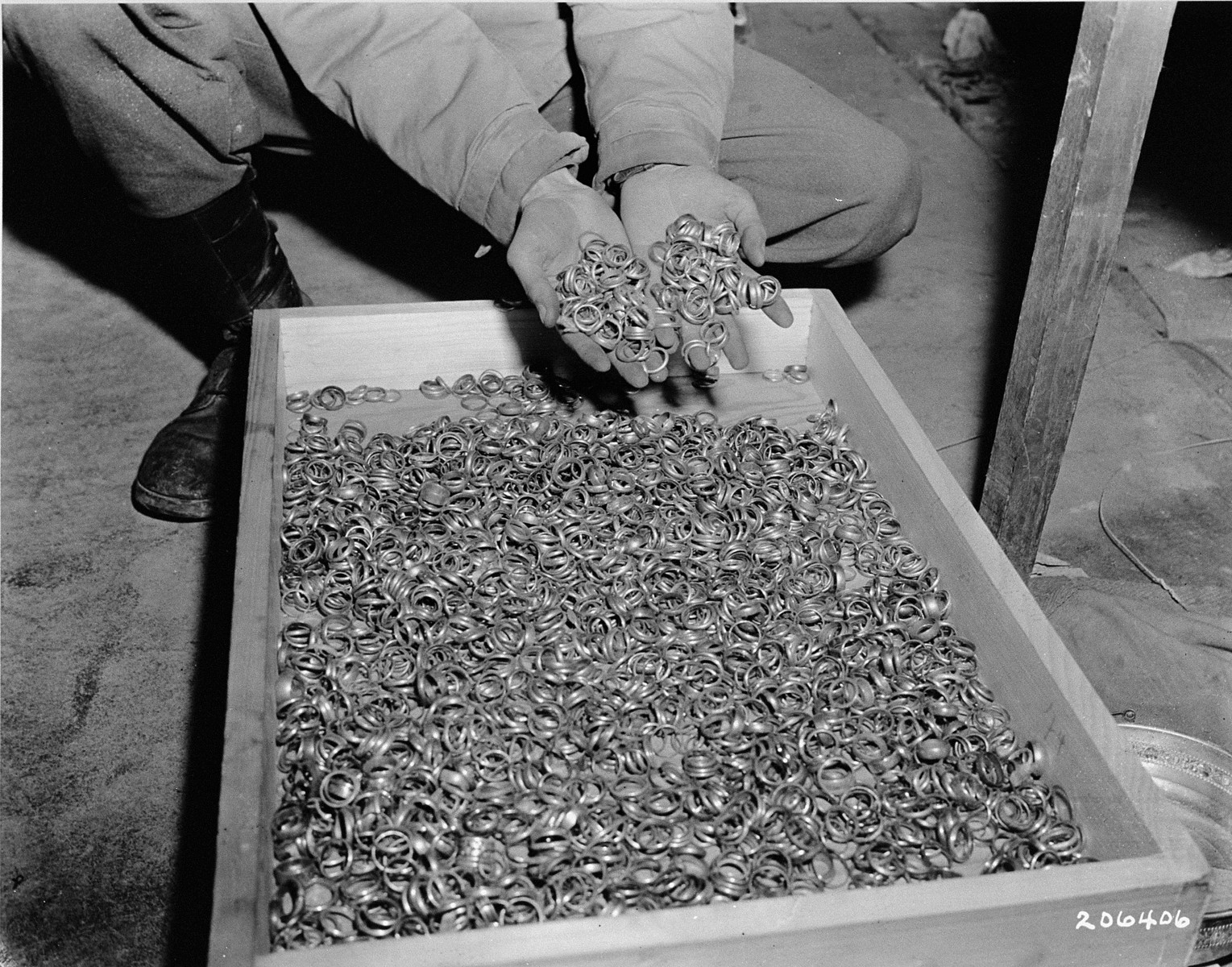
As Minister of Economics, Walther Funk accelerated the pace of re-armament and as Reichsbank president banked for the SS the gold rings of Nazi concentration camp victims.

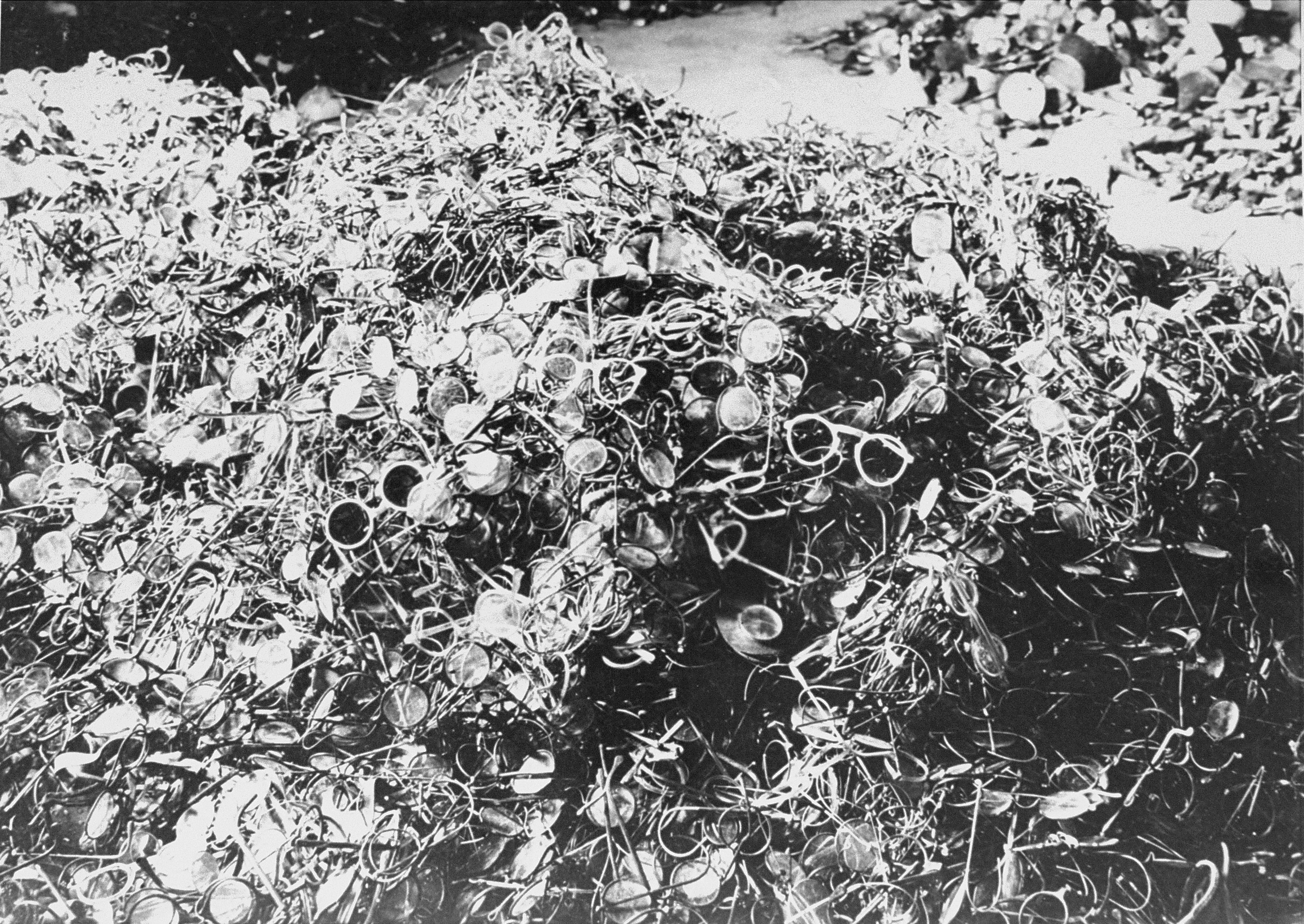
Eyeglasses of victims from Auschwitz

The Third Reich amassed hundreds of thousands of objects from occupied nations and stored them in several key locations, such as Musée Jeu de Paume in Paris and the Nazi headquarters in Munich. As the Allied forces gained advantage in the war and bombed Germany's cities and historic institutions, Germany "began storing the artworks in salt mines and caves for protection from Allied bombing raids. These mines and caves offered the appropriate humidity and temperature conditions for artworks." Well known repositories of this kind were mines in Merkers, Altaussee, and Siegen. These mines were not only used for the storage of looted art but also of art that had been in Germany and Austria before the beginning of the Nazi rule.

Modern art, denigrated as degenerate, was legally banned by the Nazis from entering Germany. Artworks designated as such were held in what was called the Martyr's Room at the Jeu de Paume. Much of Paul Rosenberg's professional dealership and personal collection were so subsequently designated by the Nazis. Following Joseph Goebbels's earlier private decree to sell these degenerate works for foreign currency to fund the building of the Führermuseum and the wider war effort, Hermann Göring personally appointed a series of ERR-approved dealers to liquidate these assets and then pass the funds to swell his personal art collection, including Hildebrand Gurlitt. With the looted degenerate art sold onward via Switzerland, Rosenberg's collection was scattered across Europe. Today, some 70 of his paintings are missing, including: the large Picasso watercolor Naked Woman on the Beach, painted in Provence in 1923; seven works by Matisse; and the Portrait of Gabrielle Diot by Degas.

Additionally, plundered objects were sent to Argentina, where numerous Nazi refugees escaped via the ratlines, especially during the presidency of Juan Perón (1946–1955). According to resurfaced documents, Argentine Nazis deposited funds, presumably derived from Nazi plunder, at Credit Suisse, a Swiss bank. The Simon Wiesenthal Center theorizes that this was done so Germany could withdraw it as exchangeable currency—and also possibly to fund the ratlines. In 2025, Portrait of a Lady by Giacomo Ceruti resurfaced in Buenos Aires Province.

== Plunder of Jewish books ==
One of the things Nazis sought after during their invasion of European countries was Jewish books and writings. Their goal was to collect all of Europe's Jewish books and burn them. One of the first countries to be raided was France, where the Nazis took 50,000 books from the Alliance Israélite Universelle; 10,000 from L'Ecole Rabbinique, one of Paris's most significant rabbinic seminaries; and 4,000 volumes from the Federation of Jewish Societies of France, an umbrella group. From there, they went on to take a total of 20,000 books from the Lipschuetz Bookstore and another 28,000 from the Rothschild family's personal collection, before scouring the private homes of Paris and coming up with thousands of more books. After sweeping France for every Jewish book they could find, the Nazis moved on to the Netherlands where they would take millions more. They raided the house of Hans Furstenberg, a wealthy Jewish banker and stole his 16,000 volume collection; in Amsterdam, they took 25,000 volumes from the Bibliotheek van het Portugeesch Israelietisch Seminarium; 4,000 from Ashkenazic Beth ha- Midrasch Ets Haim; and 100,000 from Bibliotheca Rosenthaliana. In Italy, the central synagogue of Rome contained two libraries, one was owned by the Italian Rabbinic College and the other one was the Jewish community Library. In 1943, the Nazis came through Italy, packaged up every book from the synagogue, and sent them back to Germany.

=== Immediate aftermath ===
The Allies created special commissions, such as the MFAA organization to help protect famous European monuments from destruction and, after the war, to travel to formerly Nazi-occupied territories to find Nazi art repositories. In 1944 and 1945, one of the greatest challenges for the "Monuments Men" was to keep Allied forces from plundering and "taking artworks and sending them home to friends and family"; When "off-limits" warning signs failed to protect the artworks the "Monuments Men" started to mark the storage places with white tape, which was used by Allied troops as a warning sign for unexploded mines. They recovered thousands of objects, many of which had been pillaged by the Nazis.

The Allies found these artworks in over 1,050 repositories in Germany and Austria at the end of World War II. In summer 1945, Capt. Walter Farmer became the collecting point's first director. The first shipment of artworks arriving at Wiesbaden Collection Point included cases of antiquities, Egyptian art, Islamic artifacts, and paintings from the Kaiser Friedrich Museum. The collecting point also received materials from the Reichsbank and Nazi-looted, Polish, liturgical collections. At its height, Wiesbaden stored, identified, and restituted approximately 700,000 individual objects, including paintings and sculptures, mainly to keep them away from the Soviet Army and wartime reparations.

The Allies collected the artworks and stored them in collecting points, in particular the Central Collection Point in Munich until they could be returned. The identifiable works of art, that had been acquired by the Germans during the Nazi rule, were returned to the countries from which they were taken. It was up to the governments of each nation if and under which circumstances they would return the objects to the original owners.

When the Munich collection point was closed, the owners of many of the objects had not been found. Nations were also unable to find all the owners or to verify that they were dead. There are many organizations put in place to help return the stolen items taken from the Jewish people. For example: the World Jewish Restitution Organization, Project Heart, and the Conference on Jewish Material Claims Against Germany. Depending on the circumstances, these organizations may receive the artworks in lieu of the heirs.

=== Later developments ===
Although most of the stolen artworks and antiques were documented, found, or recovered "by the victorious Allied armies ... principally hidden away in salt mines, tunnels, and secluded castles", many artworks have never been returned to their rightful owners. Art dealers, galleries, and museums worldwide have been compelled to research their collection's provenance in order to investigate claims that some of the work was acquired after it had been stolen from its original owners. Already in 1985, years before American museums recognized the issue and before the international conference on Nazi-looted assets of Holocaust victims, European countries released inventory lists of works of art, coins, and medals "that were confiscated from Jews by the Nazis during World War II, and announced the details of a process for returning the works to their owners and rightful heirs". In 1998, an Austrian advisory panel recommended the return of 6,292 objets d'art to their legal owners (most of whom are Jews), under the terms of a 1998 restitution law.

Nazi concentration camp and death camp victims had to strip completely before their murder, and all their personal belongings were stolen. The very valuable items, such as gold coins, rings, spectacles, jewelry, and other precious metal items, were sent to the Reichsbank for conversion to bullion. The value was then credited to SS accounts.

Pieces of art looted by the Nazis can still be found in Russian/Soviet and American institutions: the Metropolitan Museum of Art revealed a list of 393 paintings that have gaps in their provenance during the Nazi Era, the Art Institute of Chicago has posted a listing of more than 500 works "for which links in the chain of ownership for the years 1933–1945 are still unclear or not yet fully determined." The San Diego Museum of Art and the Los Angeles County Museum of Art provide lists on the internet to determine if art items within their collection were stolen by the Nazis.

Stuart Eizenstat, the Under Secretary of State and head of the US delegation sponsoring the 1998 international conference on Nazi-looted assets of Holocaust victims in Washington conference stated that "From now on, [...] the sale, purchase, exchange and display of art from this period will be addressed with greater sensitivity and a higher international standard of responsibility." The conference was attended by more than 49 countries and 13 different private entities, and the goal was to come to a federal consensus on how to handle Nazi-Era Looted Art. The conference was built on the foundation of the Nazi Gold Conference held in London in 1997. The US Department of State hosted the conference with the US Holocaust Memorial Museum from 30 November to 3 December 1998.

After the conference, the Association of Art Museum Directors developed guidelines which require museums to review the provenance or history of their collections, focussing especially on art looted by the Nazis. The National Gallery of Art in Washington identified more than 400 European paintings with gaps in their provenance during the World War II era. One particular piece of art, "Still Life with Fruit and Game" by the 16th-century Flemish painter Frans Snyders, was sold by Karl Haberstock, whom the World Jewish Congress describes as "one of the most notorious Nazi art dealers." In 2000, the New York City's Museum of Modern Art still told the US Congress that they were "not aware of a single Nazi-tainted work of art in our collection, of the more than 100,000" they held.

In 1979, two paintings, a Renoir, Tête de jeune fille, and a Pissarro, Rue de village, appeared on Interpol's "12 Most Wanted List", but, to date, no-one knows their whereabouts (ATA Newsletter, Nov. '79, vol. 1, no. 9, p. 1. '78, 326.1–2). The New Jersey owner has asked the International Foundation for Art Research (IFAR) to republish information about the theft, with the hope that someone will recognize the paintings. The owner wrote IFAR that, when his parents emigrated from Berlin in 1938, two of their paintings "mysteriously disappeared". All of their other possessions were shipped from Germany to the US via the Netherlands, and everything except the box containing these two paintings arrived intact. After World War II, the owner's father made a considerable effort to locate the paintings but was unsuccessful. Over the years, numerous efforts have been made to recover them, articles have been published, and an advertisement appeared in the German magazine, Die Weltkunst, 15 May 1959. A considerable reward has been offered, subject to usual conditions, but there has been no response.

However, restitution efforts initiated by German politicians have not been free of controversy, either. As the German law for restitution applies to "cultural assets lost as a result of Nazi persecution, "which includes paintings that Jews who emigrated from Germany sold to support themselves, pretty much any trade involving Jews in that era is affected, and the benefit of the doubt is given to claimants. German leftist politicians Klaus Wowereit (SPD, mayor of Berlin) and Thomas Flierl (Linkspartei) were sued in 2006 for being overly willing to give away the 1913 painting Berliner Straßenszene of expressionist Ernst Ludwig Kirchner, which was in Berlin's Brücke Museum. On display in Cologne in 1937, it had been sold for 3,000 Reichsmarks by a Jewish family residing in Switzerland to a German collector. This sum is considered by experts to have been well over the market price. The museum, which obtained the painting in 1980 after several ownership changes, could not prove that the family actually received the money. It was restituted to the heiress of the former owners, and she had it auctioned off for $38.1 million.

In 2010, as work began to extend an underground line from Alexanderplatz through the historic city centre to the Brandenburg Gate, a number of sculptures from the degenerate art exhibition were unearthed in the cellar of a private house close to the "Rote Rathaus". The sculptures, including a bronze cubist style statue of a female dancer by the artist Marg Moll, are now on display at the Neues Museum.

From 2013 up to 2015, a committee researched the collection of the Dutch Royal family. The committee focussed on all objects acquired by the family since 1933 and which were made prior to 1945. In total, 1,300 artworks were studied. Dutch musea had already researched their collection in order to find objects stolen by the Nazis. It appeared that one painting of the forest near Huis ten Bosch by the Dutch painter Joris van der Haagen came from a Jewish collector. He was forced to hand the painting over to the former Jewish bank Lippmann, Rosenthal & Co. in Amsterdam, which collected money and other possessions of the Jews in Amsterdam. The painting was bought by Queen Juliana in 1960. The family plans to return the painting to the heirs of the owner in 1942, a Jewish collector.

In 2020, the Jewish Museum in Prague initiated repatriation agreements with academic libraries in the United States for books in their collections previously looted from the Jewish Religious Community Library in Prague.

== Effects of Nazi looting today ==
Approximately 20 percent of the art in Europe was looted by the Nazis, and there are well over 100,000 items that have not been returned to their rightful owners. The majority of what is still missing includes everyday objects such as china, crystal, or silver. The extent to which looted art was taken was seen according to Spiegler as, "The Nazi art confiscation program has been called the greatest displacement of art in human history." At the end of WWII, "The United States Government ... estimated that German forces and other Nazi agents before and during World War II had seized or coerced the sale of one fifth of all Western art then in existence, approximately a quarter of a million pieces of art." Because of such wide displacement of Nazi looted art from all over Europe, the locations of perhaps tens of thousands of plundered pieces remain at large.

Some objects of great cultural significance remain missing, though how much has yet to be determined. This is a major issue for the art market, since legitimate organizations do not want to deal in objects with unclear ownership titles. Since the mid-1990s, after several books, magazines, and newspapers began exposing the subject to the general public, many dealers, auction houses, and museums have grown more careful about checking the provenance of objects that are available for purchase in case they are looted. Some museums in the US and elsewhere have agreed to check the provenance of works in their collections.

In addition to the role of courts in determining restitution or compensation, some states have created official bodies for the consideration and resolution of claims. In the UK, the Spoliation Advisory Panel advises the Department for Culture, Media and Sport on such claims. IFAR, a not-for-profit educational and research organization, maintains a database of looted art.

In 2013, the Canadian government created the Holocaust-era Provenance Research and Best-Practice Guidelines Project, through which they are investigating the holdings of six art galleries in Canada.

=== 1992 International Archives for the Women's Movement discovery ===
On 14 January 1992, historian Marc Jansen reported in an article in NRC Handelsblad that archival collections stolen from the Netherlands including the records of the International Archives for the Women's Movement (Dutch: Internationaal Archief voor de Vrouwenbeweging), which had been looted in 1940, had been found in Russia. The confiscated records were initially sent to Berlin and later was moved to Sudetenland for security reasons. At the end of the war, the Red Army took the documents from German-occupied Czechoslovakia and, in 1945–1946, stored them in the KGB's Osobyi Archive (Russian: Особый архив), meaning special archive, which was housed in Moscow. Though agreements were drafted almost immediately after the discovery, bureaucratic delays kept the archives from being returned for 11 years. In 2003, the partial recovery of the papers of some of the most noted feminists in the prewar period, including Aletta Jacobs and Rosa Manus, some 4,650 books and periodicals, records of the International Council of Women and International Woman Suffrage Alliance, among many photographs were returned. Approximately half of the original collection is still unrecovered.

=== 2012 Munich artworks discovery ===
In early 2012, roughly 1,500 pieces of art were discovered at the home of Cornelius Gurlitt, the son of Hildebrand Gurlitt. About 200–300 pieces are suspected of being looted art, some of which may have been exhibited in the degenerate art exhibition held by the Nazis before World War II in several large German cities. The collection contains works by Marc Chagall, Otto Dix, and Henri Matisse, Renoir, and Max Liebermann among many others.

=== 2014 Nuremberg artworks discovery ===
In January 2014, researcher Dominik Radlmaier of the city of Nuremberg announced that eight objects had been identified as lost art with a further 11 being under strong suspicion. The city's research project was started in 2004 and Radlmaier has been investigating full-time since then.

=== 2015 Wałbrzych, Poland rumored armored train ===
In Wałbrzych, Poland two amateur explorers—Piotr Koper and Andreas Richter—claimed to have found a rumored armored train believed to be filled with gold, gems, and weapons. The train was rumored to be sealed in a tunnel in the closing days of World War II. Only 10% of the tunnel has been explored because much of it has collapsed. Finding the train would be an expensive and complicated operation involving a lot of funding, digging, and drilling. However, to support their claims the explorers said experts have examined the site with ground-penetrating, thermal, and magnetic sensors that picked up signs of a railway tunnel with metal tracks. The explorers requested 10% of the value of whatever is within the train if their findings are correct. Poland's deputy culture minister, Piotr Zuchowski, said he was "99 percent convinced" that the train had finally been found, but scientists claim that the explorers' findings are false.

=== U.S. museum transparency ===
In September 2025, the World Jewish Restitution Organization reported that most American museums provided inadequate online information about the ownership histories of lost pieces. For instance, a portal managed by the American Alliance of Museums from 2003 to 2024 tracked almost 30,000 works. According to a survey of 160 museums, only 33 provided satisfactory information on their websites, with a number of others sharing less than they previously did via the portal.

== Jewish Digital Cultural Recovery Project ==
The Jewish Digital Cultural Recovery Project (JDCRP) is a comprehensive database that focusses on the Jewish-owned art and cultural objects plundered by the Nazis and their allies from 1933 to 1945. The JDCRP was initiated in May 2016 by the Conference on Jewish Material Claims Against Germany in collaboration with the Commission for Art Recovery. Their goal was to further expand on the existing database of objects stolen by the Reichsleiter Rosenberg Taskforce (Einsatzstab Reichsleiter Rosenberg), one of the primary Nazi agencies involved with the plunder of cultural artifacts in Nazi-occupied nations during World War II.

This data on Jewish objects looted during WWII provides a deeper understanding of the looting agencies of the Nazis, the current whereabouts of individual artifacts, and details on persecuted Jewish artists. It can provide further guidance to families and heirs on art, museums, and the art market. Lastly, it can memorialize Jewish artists who were victims of the Nazi party, and celebrate their artistic legacies. The goal of the JDCRP is not to replace existing databases and publications but to supplement the available information and build upon it with a focus on art plundered from Jews. Furthermore, the mission of the JDCRP is also to develop a network of institutions to promote additional research on the topic.

The JDCRP accumulates data from a variety of sources. A few examples include inventories of looted objects found by Allied forces, lists of stolen objects submitted by victims, and lists of looted and restituted cultural objects compiled by governments. Once data is gathered on a specific object, the JDCRP strives to exhibit the following pieces of information: details regarding the stolen object, background on the perpetrators and victims of the theft, information on those who profited from the thefts, and specifics on the locations at which the stolen object(s) were held.

On 1 January 2020, the JDCRP launched its Pilot Project centered around the famous art collection of Adolphe Schloss. The purpose of this initial launch is to test the feasibility of a central database for stolen Jewish artifacts and to determine the manner in which the JDCRP database will be constructed and maintained. This venture is funded by the European Union and is intended to establish the framework necessary for the JDCRP.

== Other looted artworks ==
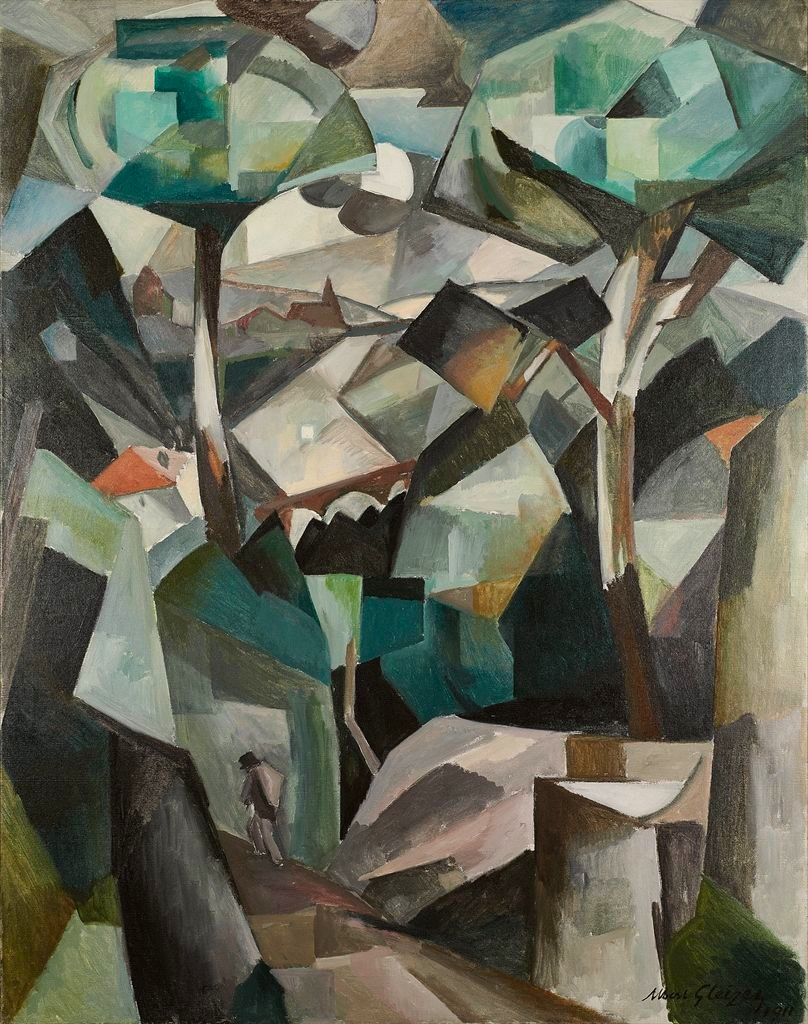
Albert Gleizes's Le Chemin, Paysage à Meudon (1911) was stolen by Nazi occupiers from the home of collector Alphonse Kann during World War II and returned to its rightful owners in 1997.

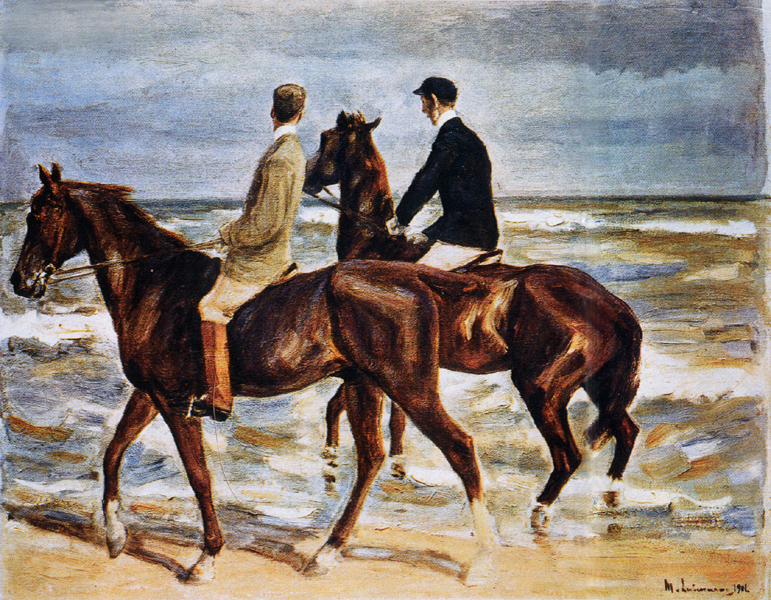
Max Liebermann's Two Riders On The Beach discovered in the Gurlitt Collection and subsequently restituted to the descendants of the original Jewish owner

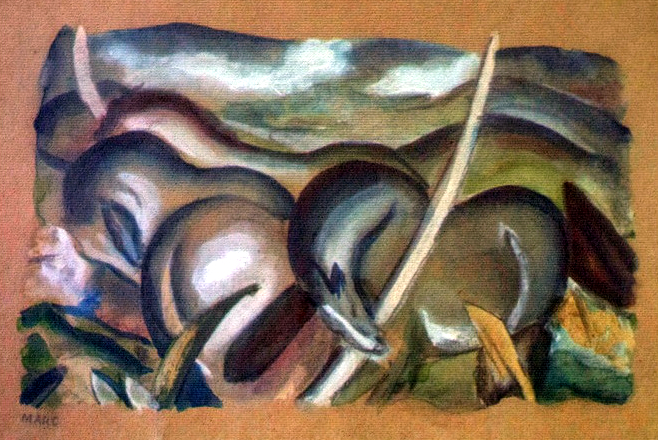
Franz Marc's Pferde in Landschaft, one of the artworks discovered in Munich in 2012

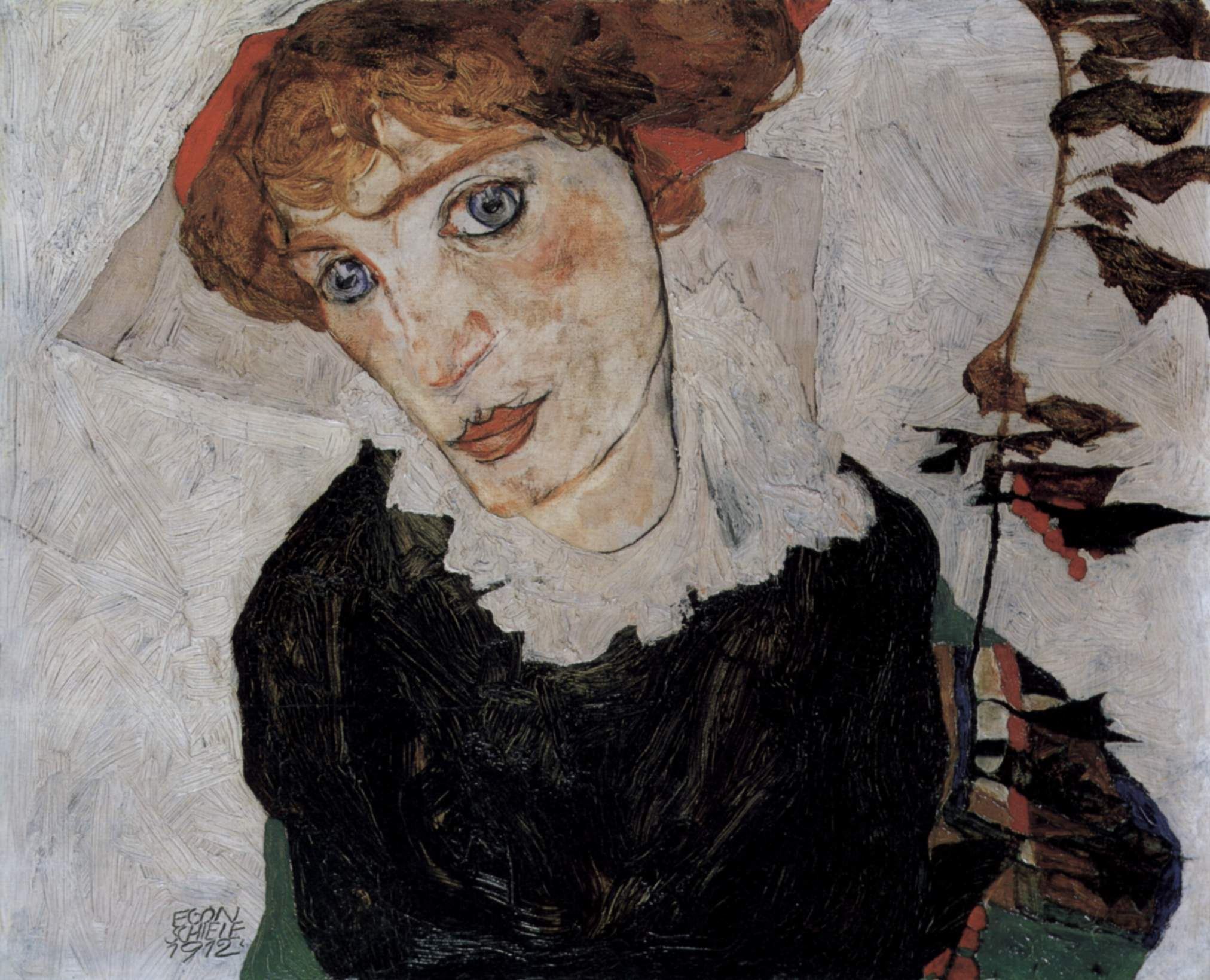
Portrait of Wally by Egon Schiele (1912)

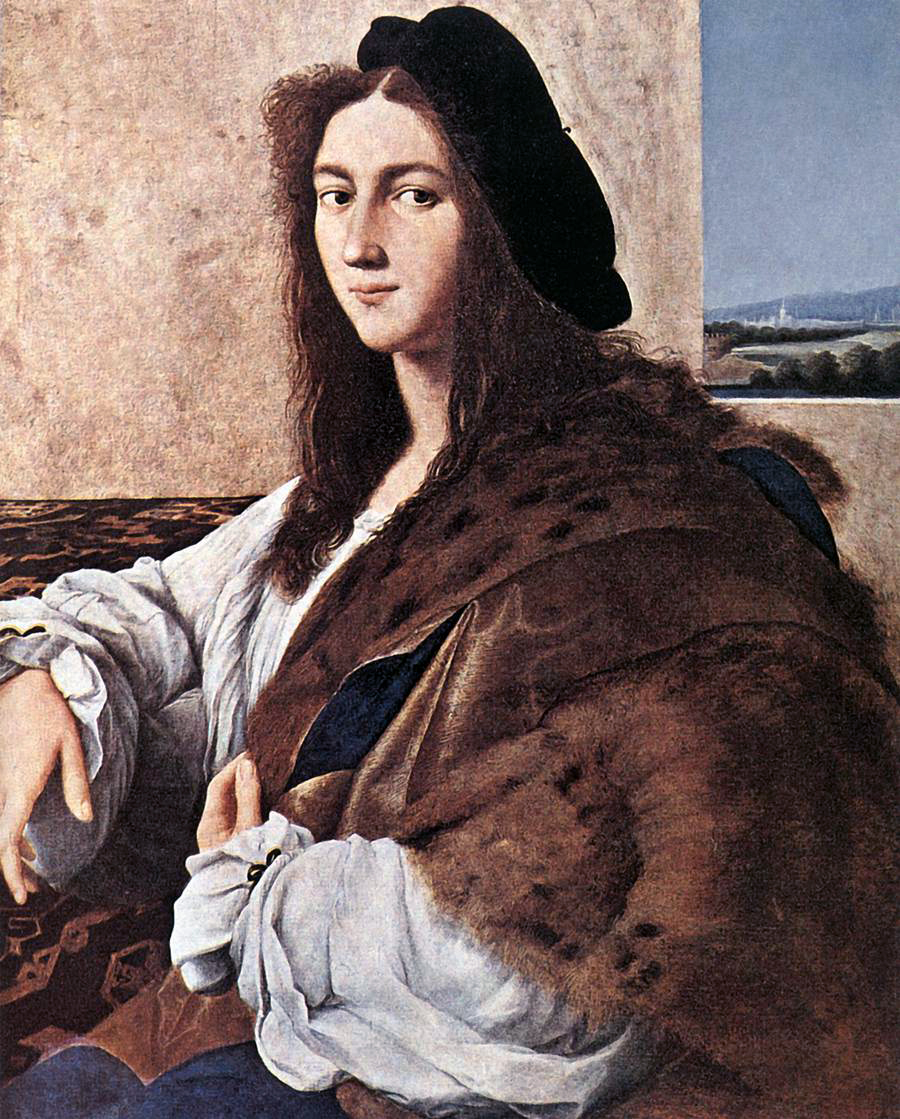
Raphael's Portrait of a Young Man was looted by the Germans from the Czartoryski Museum in 1939. Although Polish officials state that it has been known "for years" that the painting survived the war, its whereabouts remain unknown.

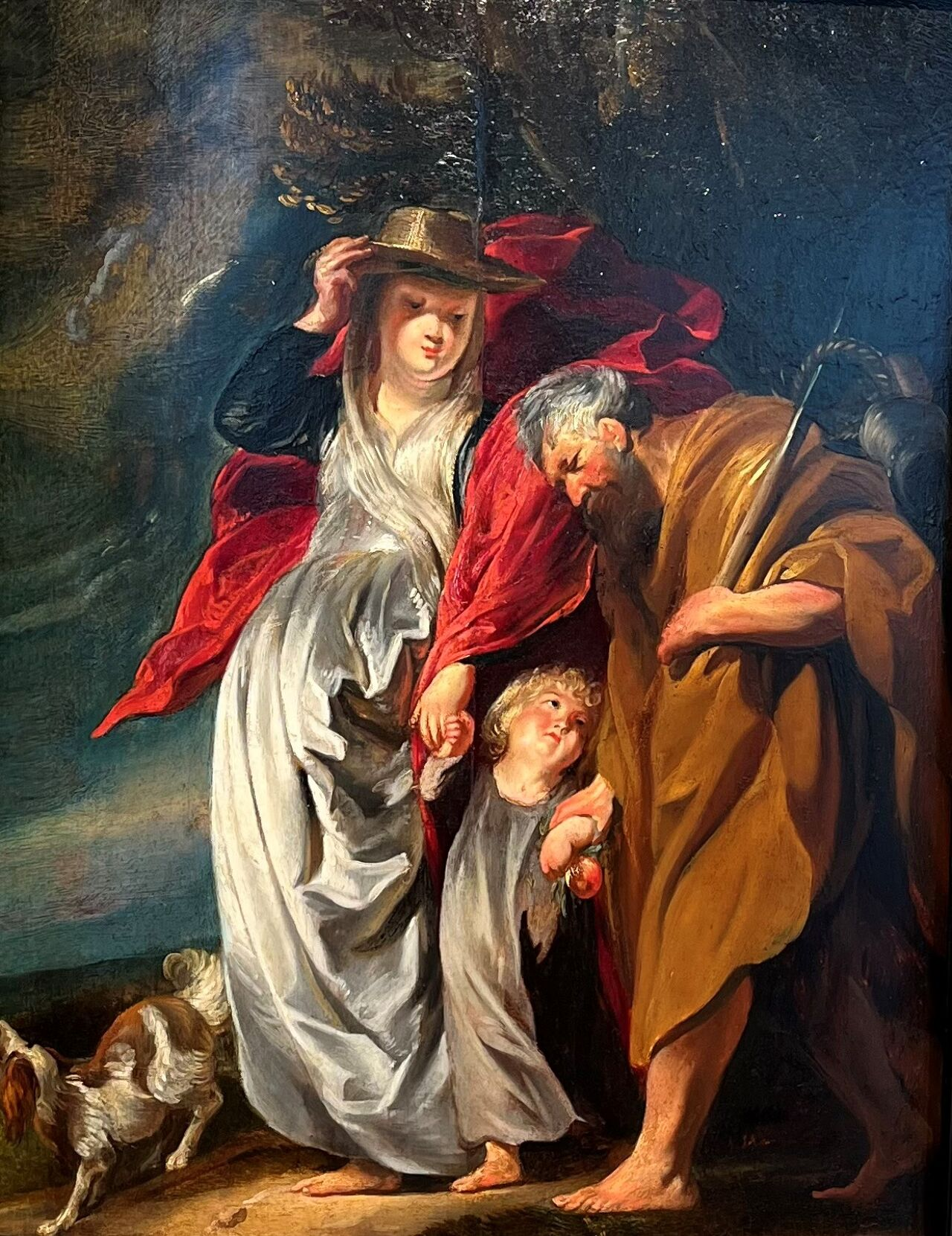
The Return of the Holy Family from the Flight into Egypt by Jacob Jordaens, c. 1618–1620. The painting was restituted in 2025.

== See also ==
- Amber Room
- Arthur Seyss-Inquart
- Aryanization
- Berlinka (art collection)
- Business collaboration with Nazi Germany
- Evacuation of the Louvre museum art collection during World War II
- Holy Crown of Hungary
- List of claims for restitution for Nazi-looted art
- List of missing treasures
- M-Aktion
- Menzel v. List
- The Monuments Men – 2014 film by George Clooney
- Nazi looting of artworks by Vincent van Gogh
- Napoleonic looting of art
- Vugesta – Nazi looting organization
- Woman in Gold – 2015 British drama film directed by Simon Curtis
