= Walter Bornheim =

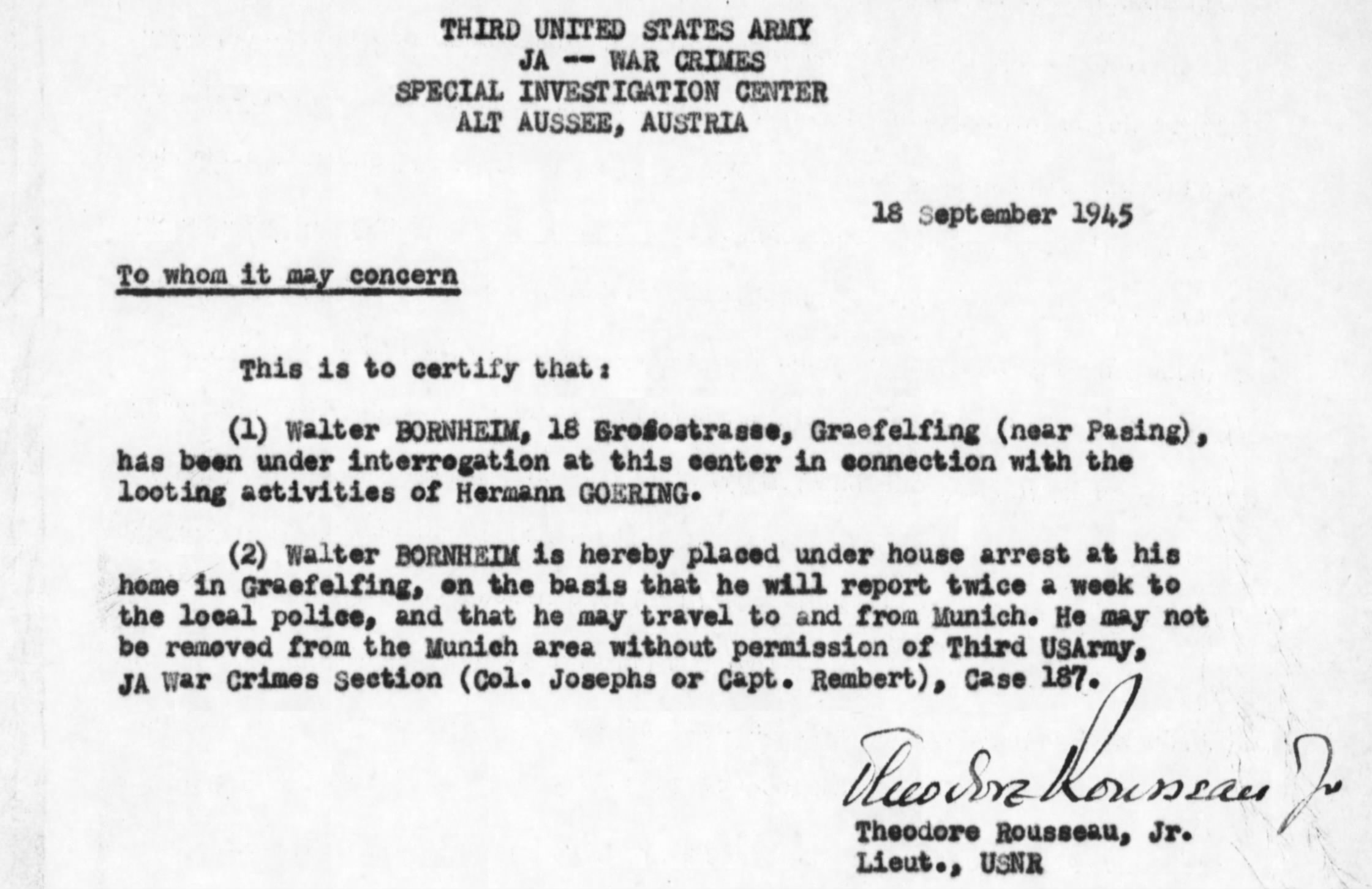
US Army note

Walter Bornheim (born August 23, 1888 in Cologne; died 1971) was a German art dealer deeply involved in Nazi looted art.

Walter Bornheim attended grammar school in Cologne and worked for the Lempertz auction house in Cologne, and later for Bihn, a graphics dealer in Paris. He worked as an art dealer in London and Brussels. A corporal in the First World War, he was taken prisoner in France, and released in 1920. He then worked as an art dealer in Cologne, specializing in prints.

== Nazi era ==
In 1936/37, he acquired the art dealership A. S. Drey in Munich in the course of "Aryanization", which he renamed "Galerie für Alte Kunst G.m.b.H.". Together with Kajetan Mühlmann, he was one of the largest German art dealers involved in the looting of art by the National Socialists (Nazis). He acquired art for the Nazi Hermann Göring from 1938 onwards. He did much business with French dealers during the occupation.

The OSS Art Looting Investigation Unit considered Bornheim a major player in the Nazi looted art business, and dedicated a Detailed Interrogation Report to him in 1945 in addition to mentioning him numerous times throughout their list of art looting Red Flag Names.

== Postwar ==
After the war, Bornheim continued to work as an art dealer in Gräfelfing near Munich. From 1932 he was an advisor to Otto Schäfer.

== Research projects ==
Art that was looted from Jewish collectors or sold under duress to Bornheim is the object of numerous ongoing research projects.

== Literature ==
- Günther Haase: Kunstraub und Kunstschutz. Eine Dokumentation. 2. Auflage. 2008, S. 249–253.
- Kenneth D. Alford: Hermann Göring and the Nazi Art Collection. The Looting of Europe's Art Treasures and Their Dispersal After World War II. McFarland, Jefferson, NC/London 2012, ISBN 978-0-7864-6815-7, S. 28–30.

== See also ==
- List of claims for restitution for Nazi-looted art
- The Holocaust
- Monuments Men
- Nazi Germany
