= Kurt von Behr =

Led Nazi art looting organization in Paris

Kurt Freiherr von Behr (1 March 1890 in Hannover – 19 April 1945 in Kloster Banz) headed the Nazi art looting organisation, Einsatzstab Reichsleiter Rosenberg (ERR), in Paris and was involved in the M-Aktion which looted the home furnishings of French Jews.

== Life ==
Baron von Behr, originally of Mecklenburg nobility, was an Oberführer in the German Red Cross. On 7 August 1924, he married the Englishwoman Joy Guzman Clarke (born 16 May 1896 in British India). From 1932 to 1934, he headed the Nazi (NSDAP) organization in Italy. In 1936, Behr worked for the Rosenberg Foreign Policy Office in Palma.

== Nazi looter in France ==
During the German occupation of Paris in 1940, von Behr played a major role in looting art from Jews. As deputy to the staff leader German: Gerhard Utikal, von Behr headed the Einsatzstab Reichsleiter Rosenberg (ERR), West Department in Paris. His mission was to steal “abandoned cultural property of Jews”. Alfred Rosenberg and his associate Kurt von Behr were "ruthless and eager to be Hitler's creatures". Von Behr also supplied Hermann Göring with stolen works of art. From 17 July 1940 to 20 February 1941, he sent paintings looted from France and French Jews to the German Reich.

From January 1942 to August 1944, he headed the M-Aktion in Paris, which stole the furniture, pianos and other home furnishings from the homes of French Jews and sent them to Germany to be distributed to German citizens of the Reich. Von Behr was involved in Nazi looting and part of a network of Nazi functionaries and art dealers that plundered property from Jews to raise cash to support the war effort, to enrich private Nazi collections or for personal gain. In its analysis of Nazi art looting, the OSS Art Looting Intelligence Unit wrote of von Behr, " As head of ERR, Paris, the individual chiefly responsible for organised looting in France." Along with Bruno Lohse, von Behr was considered one of the "masterminds of the artistic plunder enacted by the ERR in France."

=== Looting of French Artworks - Train 40044 ===
On 1 August 1944, a few weeks before the Liberation of Paris on 25 August 1944, Rose Valland, a French art historian and member of the French Resistance, learned that von Behr was planning to remove to Germany as much artwork as he could, including many modern paintings. Valland learned that the trucks which had collected the artworks were heading to the Aubervilliers train station on the outskirts of Paris. By the 2 August 1944, 148 crates of paintings containing in total 967 paintings, including works by Braque, Cézanne, Degas, Dufy, Gauguin, Modigliani, Picasso, Toulouse-Lautrec and Utrillo had been loaded on five goods wagons waiting to be hooked up to another 48 goods wagons containing confiscated furniture and personal possessions of deported citizens. Fortunately, these other goods wagons had not yet been loaded which meant the train never left the station on schedule.

Valland was able to give a copy of the Nazi shipment order to Jaujard, which listed the train and goods wagon numbers, the contents of each crate and the destination of each goods wagon (either to Kogl Castle at Sankt Georgen im Attergau in Austria and the Nikolsburg depository in Moravia.) This information Jaujard passed on to the Resistance. By the 10 August, the train was ready to depart but by then the French railway workers were on strike. However, two days later the tracks were cleared and being delayed by higher priority trains carrying fleeing Germans and their personal possessions. The train which had the designation 40044 departed hauling a total of 53 wagons.

The overloaded train reached Le Bourget before it suffered a mechanical breakdown. By the time the Germans had fixed the problem 48 hours later, the French Resistance had derailed two trains which blocked the tracks up ahead leaving the train stranded at Aulnay-sous-Bois. This enabled the french army to later secure the crates of artworks and send them to the Louvre to be kept safe.

== Suicide of von Behr ==
After the arrival of Allied troops, von Behr and his wife committed suicide, toasting each other with champagne laced with cyanide on 19 April 1945.

In von Behr's residence, Schloss Banz, the US armed forces found not only large holdings of books looted from Western and Eastern European libraries, but also ERR archive files that had been relocated there, which provided the basis of the Nuremberg trial against Alfred Rosenberg.

== See also ==
- Alfred Rosenberg
- The Holocaust in France
- Einsatzstab Reichsleiter Rosenberg
- Nazi plunder
- Nuremberg Trials
