= Ernst Buchner (curator) =

German museum administrator and art historian

Ernst Buchner (20 March 1892 – 3 June 1962) was a German museum administrator, art historian and Nazi party member. A native of Munich, he was director of the Bavarian State Painting Collections, a position in German arts administration second only to the head of the Berlin museum network. He joined the Nazi Party in 1933, played a role in seizing Jewish art, and was eventually responsible for safeguarding German collections and Nazi Plunder from the threat of destruction in war. He largely rehabilitated his career after his post-war denazification trial.

== Early life ==
The son of a painter, Georg Buchner, Ernst Buchner attended the Ludwig-Maximilians-Universität München (LMU) in Munich to study art history until war broke out in 1914. He volunteered for an artillery unit and spent four years in the military, earning two Iron Crosses and other awards. In 1919, he returned to the university, becoming a student of the art historian Heinrich Wölfflin. He finished his dissertation on Jan Polack in three years and was an expert in Bavarian art. Aspiring to a prominent career and astute at developing patronage connections in arts administration, he began as an intern at Bavarian State Painting Collections (the Bayerische Staatsgemäldesammlungen abbreviated as BSGS) in 1921 and held junior positions for the next few years at Munich museums, becoming curator at the BSGS in 1926, and then director of the Wallraf-Richartz Museum in 1928.

== Nazi arts administration before and during World War II ==
Buchner was named director of the Bavarian State Painting Collections in July 1932. It was one of the most senior roles in German arts administration, overseeing fifteen museums, including the Alte Pinakothek, Neue Pinakothek, Neue Staatsgalerie, and various provincial museums. He started on 1 March 1933, he joined Nazi Party two months later. His three children joined Hitler Youth or the Association for Young Girls before such membership was required. His son was injured in the March 1943 bombing of Munich.

Buchner held a high opinion of premodern German art and had nationalistic tendencies. The report of the post-war Art Looting Investigation Unit mentioned his "fixed belief in a Greater Germany—whether the Fuehrer be Frederick the Great, William the Second, or Hitler". He was, however, less hostile to modernist and "degenerate art" than many in the regime, defending works by Max Liebermann and Edvard Munch. He appreciated Vincent van Gogh and even Franz Marc. Still, he had little interest in the more "primitive" Expressionist artists or in the New Objectivity movement. He declined Emil Nolde's request for an exhibit in 1935.

== Key figure in Nazi looted art trade ==
A Nazi, Buchner stored artworks seized from Jews by the Gestapo in the Bavarian National Museum. He purchased art looted from Jews for his own museum collections directly from the Gestapo, including pieces by Eugène Delacroix and Wilhelm Trübner. As Jews were persecuted and their assets Aryanized or seize outright, Buchner acquired art from Jews at bargain prices. The OSS Art Looting Investigation Unit included Buchner in its Red Flag Names list and dedicated a specific interrogation report to Bucher.

== Other activities ==
Buchner was known for making bad trades because he was overly interested in German art. He parted with pieces by Raphael, Rubens, Renoir, and Monet in exchange for artists like Matthias Grünewald (for a panel of questionable authenticity), Hans Thoma, Wolf Huber, and Johann Jakob Zeiller. These trades are still remembered by museum staff as "disasters", with few of the acquisitions even on display today.

Buchner was ordered to lead a search for van Eyck's Ghent Altarpiece, which had been moved from Belgium to unoccupied France for safekeeping from war. The altar was stored in a local museum in Pau, France, until the Reich Chancellery ordered its transport to Germany in June 1942. Although the transfer took place with French cooperation, and Buchner testified that the goal of the seizure was only to protect the painting, according to historian Jonathan Petropoulos, it was "[not so] ambiguous ... that the Germans were claiming ownership of the masterpiece". A similar expedition to seize Dirk Bouts' The Last Supper triptych in Leuven was also led by Buchner.

As World War II bombings threatened to damage art collections, the Nazis moved their collections to safer sites. Buchner recommended that art taken from Parisian Jews be stored in the Dachau Palace or the Neuschwanstein Castle. The latter was chosen by April 1941, and along with the confiscated art about 2,000 pieces from the BSGS collections were moved there. (By the end of Buchner's directorship of the BSGS, the museum network had about 12,000 paintings.) Buchner was on a committee that recommended the use of a salt mine near Altaussee for storage, travelling there in December 1943 to review its suitability. The Nazis ultimately stored 6,577 paintings, 137 sculptures, and 484 crates of other art at Altaussee, and there was very little loss of BSGS collections from war damage. As the war took its toll on Germany, Buchner avoided intra-party conflict regarding the fate of the storage sites. There were plans to blow up the mines if they were likely to fall into Allied hands (which they did), but no site met this fate.

== Post-war rehabilitation ==
Following a few months in which Buchner's whereabouts are not certain, he was arrested by the Americans on 18 June 1945. He was interrogated by the Office of Strategic Services, an intelligence branch of the U.S. government with a division that investigated art looting. Buchner cooperated with interrogators, and an OSS report summarizes their findings; these reports are important primary sources for art historians of the Third Reich. In May 1945, Buchner had been removed from his position at BSGS, and he would have to go through the denazification process if he wished to work again as a civil servant in the Federal Republic of Germany.

At his 1948 trial he was deemed a "fellow traveller" (Mitläufer) of the Nazi Party, the second-most exonerating finding in a system with five categories of verdict. Evaluation of his past work at the trial and in the press found "ambivalent behavior" with respect to his sympathy to the Nazi Party. While he had, for example, accepted an honorarium of 30,000 Reichsmarks from Hitler for recovering the Ghent Altarpiece, he was credited with avoiding the most ideologically extreme positions of the Third Reich with respect to the arts. For example during his directorship at the BSGS, he pushed back against ideological exhibitions, and had been criticized by hardliners for doing so.

Buchner wanted to rehabilitate his career, and was largely successful in doing so. The former director applied for his old position, which already had an incumbent. In the meantime, he received government support for his research. Eventually, with the retirement of the incumbent, he was reappointed as the head of BSGS on 1 April 1953. This was not without controversy. It was feared that his sympathies with Nazi ideology were deep and pointed to Hitler's honorarium and his involvement with the theft of art.

Supporters emphasized his undisputed expertise, his role in the protection of artworks during World War II, and his abiding interest in rebuilding German culture, including the replacement of damaged museums (respecting their original architecture). The criticism did affect his reputation. The Bavarian Education Ministry, which now oversaw museums, would not extend his contract beyond his formal retirement age of 65. Thus he retired in September 1957, having been given an extension to finish the re-opening of the Alte Pinakothek.

He spent the remainder of his life researching and writing, and died in June 1962 while working on a five-volume study of German panel painting.
