= Jonathan Petropoulos =

American historian (born 1961)

Jonathan Petropoulos (born January 10, 1961) is an American historian who writes about National Socialism and, in particular, the fate of art looted during World War II. He is John V. Croul Professor of European History at Claremont McKenna College in Claremont, California. Before his 1999 appointment to Claremont McKenna College, Petropoulos taught at Loyola College in Maryland.

== Biography ==
From 1998 to 2000, Petropoulos served as Research Director for the Presidential Advisory Commission on Holocaust Assets, chaired by Edgar Bronfman, Sr. Since 2000, Petropoulos has served as an expert witness in several legal cases concerning Nazi-looted assets, including Altmann v. Austria (six paintings by Klimt, including Portrait of Adele Bloch-Bauer I), Cassirer v. Thyssen-Bornemisza Museum (painting by Pissarro), Kann v. Wildenstein (medieval manuscripts), and Rosner et al. v. U.S.A. (the Hungarian Gold Train case).

Petropoulos was featured in The Rape of Europa, a 2006 documentary on Nazi art looting. He is the author of four books: Art as Politics in the Third Reich (1996), The Faustian Bargain (2000), Royals and the Reich (2006) and Artists Under Hitler: Collaboration and Survival in Nazi Germany (2014). With John Roth, he is the co-editor of Gray Zones: Ambiguity and Compromise in the Holocaust and Aftermath (2005).

In April 2008, Petropoulos resigned his position as director of Claremont McKenna College's Center for the Study of the Holocaust, Genocide and Human Rights amidst controversy over the failed restitution of a Pissarro painting looted by the Nazis in 1938. The London-based Art Loss Register employed Petropoulos because of his acquaintance with Bruno Lohse, a notorious Nazi art looter who died in 2007. The looted Pissarro, Le Quai Malaquais, Printemps, was discovered by Swiss investigators in May 2007 in a secret safe controlled by Lohse in Zurich, Switzerland. After its seizure by Swiss authorities, the painting was independently restituted to an heir of Gottfried Bermann Fischer later in 2007 by a Liechtenstein court, and ultimately auctioned by Christie's in New York for $1,850,000 ($2,154,000 with premium) on November 3, 2009.

Following a review, a March 2008 Claremont McKenna College statement said the professor "adhered to applicable contractual and legal obligations" in attempting to arrange return of the painting.

== Books ==
- Goering's Man in Paris: The Story of a Nazi Art Plunderer and His World. ISBN 978-0-300-25192-0
- Artists Under Hitler: Collaboration and Survival in Nazi Germany. ISBN 9780300197471
- The Faustian Bargain: The Art World in Nazi Germany. ISBN 978-0195129649
- Art as Politics in the Third Reich. ISBN 978-0807848098
- Royals and the Reich. Von Hessen Nazi: The Princes von Hessen in Nazi Germany. ISBN 978-0199203772
