= Louis-Antoine Prat =

French art historian and art collector

- Born: 24 December 1944; Nice, France
- Occupations: art historian, art collector
- Spouse: Véronique Bardon

Louis-Antoine Prat (born 24 December 1944 in Nice) is a French art historian and art collector, specialized in drawings.

== Early life and education ==
Louis-Antoine Prat is the son of Georges Prat, a wealthy French businessman. Georges was an art collector: he possessed paintings, sculptures, furniture and drawings.

Georges Prat died when Louis-Antoine Prat was six years old. He studied in both La Sorbonne and Sciences Po. He then followed the courses of the École du Louvre.

== The collection ==
Regularly exposed in France or other countries, the art collection of Louis-Antoine and Véronique Prat in their apartment of the 7th arrondissement of Paris has often been the subject of publications.

Their collection is mainly directed towards French drawings from 1600 to 1900. The first drawing bought by Louis and Veronique was a portrait of Max Ernst by André Breton, coming from the collection of Valentine Hugo. They donated a lot of their collection to French museums under usufruct. He is the first private art collector to have been exposed while living in the Louvre museum.

Louis-Antoine Prat was elected president of the Société des amis du Louvre in 2016.

== Selected works ==
=== Novels and short stories ===
- Les points de repère, Albin Michel, 1965
- L'amateur d'absolu, La Table Ronde, 1983
- La ciguë avec toi, La Table Ronde, 1984
- Un requiem allemand, La Table Ronde, 1985
- Trois reflets d'Argentine, La Table Ronde, 1986
- Le tombeau du nouvelliste : nouvelles, La Table Ronde, 1988
- Belle encore et autres nouvelles, Somogy, 2019

=== Radio drama ===
- La trahison, France Culture, 1969
- La leçon d’histoire, France Culture, 1969 (with D.-P. Larger)
- Parfois deux sans trois, France Culture, 1970
- Pourquoi Fleur pleurait-elle ?, France Culture, 1971
- Nuit de guerre au Louvre, Samsa, 2019

=== Art history ===
- Nicolas Poussin, 1594-1665, Catalogue raisonné des dessins, Milan, Leonardo, 1994, 2 volumes (with Pierre Rosenberg)
- Antoine Watteau, 1684-1721, Catalogue raisonné des dessins, Milan, Leonardo, 1996, 3 tomes (with P. Rosenberg)
- Dessins romantiques français provenant de collections privées parisiennes, Paris, Musée de la Vie Romantique, 2001
- Jacques-Louis David, 1748-1825, Catalogue raisonné des Dessins, Milan, Electa, 2002, 2 volumes (with Pierre Rosenberg)
- Théodore Chassériau. Obras sobre papel - Œuvres sur papier, Saint Domingue, 2004
- Ingres, Paris, Louvre, collection Cabinet des Dessins, n° 4, 2004
- Jacques-Louis David, Paris, Louvre, collection Cabinet des Dessins, n° 9, 2005 (with A. Serullaz)
- Ingres, Paris, Louvre, 2006
- La collection Chennevières. Quatre siècles de dessins français, Paris, 2007
- Le dessin français au XIXe siècle, Paris, 2011
- Paul Delaroche, Le cabinet des Dessins, Editions Louvre-Le Passage, Paris, Louvre, 2012
- Le dessin français au XVIIe siècle, Paris
- Le dessin français au XVIIIe siècle, Paris
- Officier et gentleman au 19e siècle: la collection His de la Salle, Paris, 2019
