= Société des amis du Louvre =

Organization supporting the Louvre

The Société des amis du Louvre ("Society of Friends of the Louvre") is a voluntary association created in 1897 whose objective is to buy objects with an artistic, archeological, or historical value for the Louvre museum.

== History ==
The Society was created in 1897 by a group of luminaries and philanthropists that included Roland Bonaparte, Isaac de Camondo, Henry Greffulhe, Camille Groult, and Edmond James de Rothschild. Victor Martin Le Roy, the noted art collector, was also one of the founders and directors of the society.

== Activity ==
The Society has approximately 70000 members. Donations and membership fees allow it to use each year 3 Million euros to acquire art objects.

Its donations to the Louvre museum amount to more than 700 items, from which some masterpieces such as the Pietà of Villeneuve-lès-Avignon, the Turkish Bath by Jean-Auguste-Dominique Ingres, and the diadem of Empress Eugénie. Some of the donations are now in the Guimet Museum or the Musée d'Orsay following reallocation of some of the French state's art collections since World War II.

== Presidents ==
- Georges Berger (1897-1910)
- Jules Maciet (1910-1911)
- Raymond Koechlin (1911-1931)
- Albert Henraux (1932-1953)
- Jacques Dupont (1954-1986)
- Raoul Ergmann (1986-1910)
- François Puaux (1990-1996)
- Marc Fumaroli (1996-2016)
- Louis-Antoine Prat (since 2016)

== See also ==
- Friends of the Natural History Museum Paris
- Art Fund
