= Stefan Koldehoff =

German journalist (born 1967)

Stefan Koldehoff (born 27 October 1967) is a German journalist, art market expert and non-fiction author. He became known through numerous publications and his work as culture editor of the Deutschlandfunk.

== Life ==
Born in Wuppertal, Koldehoff graduated in history of art, German studies and political science. At the same time, he initially worked as a freelance journalist for the Frankfurter Allgemeine Zeitung, Die Tageszeitung (taz) and the Westdeutscher Rundfunk Köln (WDR). From 1998 he was editor for three years, most recently deputy editor-in-chief of the Art magazine in Hamburg.

In 2001, Koldehoff moved to an editor's position at Deutschlandfunk. In the following years, he published numerous non-fiction books about the art market, art forgery and art history, especially on Vincent van Gogh. Between November 2016 and November 2018, he headed the editorial department of the weekday media journalistic @mediasres program, which went online and on air for the first time on 20 March 2017. On 1 December 2018, Koldehoff returned to the editorial team of the daily culture magazine Kultur heute of Deutschlandfunk. He also continues to work for the broadcaster's other cultural programs.

Koldehoff is married, has three children and lives in Cologne.

== Awards ==
- 2008: puk, journalists prize of the German Cultural Council.
- 2012: Prix Annette Giacometti (with Tobias Timm), for Falsche Bilder, Echtes Geld.
- 2012: Otto-Brenner-Preis for critical journalism (with Timm), for Falsche Bilder, Echtes Geld (3rd prize)
- 2014: Journalist des Jahres in the "Kultur/Unterhaltung"category (5th Place)

== Publications ==
=== Individual publications ===
- Deserteure in Wuppertal. Dokumentation zu den Erschießungen 1944/45. (Informationen aus dem Stadtarchiv, 7). Stadtarchiv Wuppertal 1992.
- Meier-Graefes van Gogh: wie Fiktionen zu Fakten werden. (Schriften zur Kunstkritik, vol. 9). Lindenau-Museum Altenburg. Steinmeier, Nördlingen 2002, ISBN 3-936363-05-6.
- Vincent van Gogh. Rowohlt, Reinbek 2003, ISBN 3-499-50620-3.
- Aktenzeichen Kunst – Die spektakulärsten Kunstdiebstähle der Welt. (with Nora Koldehoff.) DuMont, Cologne 2004, ISBN 3-8321-7435-4.
- Wem hat van Gogh sein Ohr geschenkt? Alles, was Sie über Kunst nicht wissen. (with Nora Koldehoff). Eichborn, Frankfurt 2007, ISBN 978-3-8218-5804-3.
- with Tobias Timm: Falsche Bilder, Echtes Geld. Galiani, Berlin 2012, ISBN 978-3-86971-057-0.
- Die Bilder sind unter uns. Das Geschäft mit der NS-Raubkunst und der Fall Gurlitt. Galiani, Berlin 2014, ISBN 978-3-86971-093-8. Neuauflage mit einem 28-seitigen Kapitel zum aktuellen (2014) Stand des Falls Gurlitt.
- Frieder Burda: Sammler aus Leidenschaft. DuMont, Cologne 2011, ISBN 978-3-8321-9361-4.
- Ich und van Gogh. Bilder, Sammler und ihre abenteuerlichen Geschichten. Galiani, Berlin 2015, ISBN 978-3-86971-102-7
- Der Van Gogh-Coup. Otto Wackers Aufstieg und Fall. (with Nora Koldehoff). Nimbus, Wädenswil 2019, ISBN 978-3-03850-064-3
- with Tobias Timm: Kunst und Verbrechen. Galiani Verlag, Berlin 2020, ISBN 3-86971-176-0.

=== Collective publications ===
- When myth seems stronger than scholarship: Van Gogh and the problem of authenticity. In Van Gogh Museum Journal. Van Gogh Museum, Amsterdam 2002, pp. 8–25. Online
- Kunst-Transfers – Thesen und Visionen zur Restitution von Kunstwerken. Eine Einführung. In Stefan Koldehoff, Gilbert Lupfer, Martin Roth (ed.): Kunst-Transfers. Deutscher Kunstverlag, Berlin 2008, ISBN 978-3-422-06886-5, pp. 23–29.
- Ob die Kunst in die neue Zeit passt – 1938, die Französische Moderne und die „Entartete Kunst“. In Eva Atlan, Raphael Gross, Julia Voss (ed.): 1938. Kunst – Künstler – Politik. Wallstein, Göttingen 2013, ISBN 978-3-8353-1412-2, pp. 275–300.
- Stefan Koldehoff, Ralf Oehmke, Raimund Stecker: Der Fall Gurlitt. Ein Gespräch. Nicolai, Berlin 2014, ISBN 978-3-89479-863-5.
- Der Fall Gurlitt und seine Folgen – eine Bestandsaufnahme. In Julius H. Schoeps, Anna-Dorothea Ludewig (ed.): Eine Debatte ohne Ende? Raubkunst und Restitution im deutschsprachigen Raum. Hentrich & Hentrich, Berlin 2014, ISBN 978-3-95565-057-5, pp. 206–222.
- Ausreden, Ignoranz und fehlendes Einfühlungsvermögen – der Umgang mit NS-Opfern und der „Fall Gurlitt“. In Kunstmuseum Bern; Kunst- und Ausstellungshalle der Bundesrepublik Deutschland (ed.): Bestandsaufnahme Gurlitt. Hirmer Verlag, Munich 2017, ISBN 978-3-7774-2962-5, pp. 69–75
- "Hauptsächlich malt er Blumen" – Van Goghs Pariser Blumenstillleben. In Ortrud Westheider, Michael Philipp (ed.): Van Gogh – Stillleben. Prestel Verlag, Munich 2019, ISBN 978-3-7913-5871-0, pp. 66–85

=== Publisher ===
- O-Ton Pina Bausch – Interviews und Reden. Nimbus, Wädenswil 2016, ISBN 978-3-03850-021-6.
- The Thannhauser Gallery – Marketing Van Gogh. (published with Chris Stolwijk). Mercatorfonds, Brüssel/Yale University Press, New Haven 2017, ISBN 978-94-6230-166-5.
  - In German: Die Galerie Thannhauser – Van Gogh wird zur Marke. Belser Verlag, Stuttgart 2017, ISBN 978-3-7630-2774-3.
