= Albert Henraux =

French arts administrator

Albert Henraux, or Albert S. Henraux, or Albert Sancholle Henraux, (1881-1953), was an important French arts administrator who served as President of the Arts Council of National Museums, President of the Commission de Récupération Artistique (French Commission for Art Recovery), and President of Friends of the Louvre.

== Biography ==
A graduate of the Free School of Political Sciences, in 1932 he became president of the Société des Amis du Louvre and president of the Superior Council of National Museums. From November 1944 to December 1949, he chaired the Commission for artistic recovery in charge of repatriating to France works of art, works of art and precious objects, books, archives and manuscripts, looted and taken out of the territory by the Germans during the 'Occupation. In this administration, placed under the supervision of the Director of Arts and Letters and the Minister of National Education, he was the hierarchical superior of Michel Florisoone and Rose Valland. After the war, using repatriated works, he organized the exhibition Masterpieces from French private collections, found in Germany (Paris: Musée de l'Orangerie, 1946).

As a member of the Institut de France, he was appointed curator of the Musée Condé after the war.

He is the brother of the collector Lucien Henraux (1877-1926) and the brother-in-law of Marie Bernières-Henraux, sculptor, former student of Auguste Rodin.

== Principal publications ==
- Rapports de la France et du Piémont de 1795 à 1804, Mémoire de l'École libre des sciences politiques, Paris, 1902.
- Exposition internationale de 1937 : Groupe 1. Classe 3. Musées et expositions. Section 1. Muséographie, Catalogue, guide illustré..., Paris : Editions Denoël, 1937.
- Les chefs-d'œuvre des collections privées françaises, retrouvées en Allemagne, Paris : Musée de l'Orangerie, 1946.
- Le cabinet de l'amateur : catalogue de l'exposition au Musée de l'Orangerie des Tuileries, février-avril 1956, organisée par la Société des Amis du Louvre en souvenir de M.A.S. Henraux, Paris : Éditions des musées nationaux, 1956.
