= M-Aktion =

Nazi looting organization

The M-Aktion ("Furniture Action" or also "M-Action", abbreviation for "Möbel-Aktion") was a Nazi looting organisation. Attached to the "Einsatzstab Reichsleiter Rosenberg", starting in early 1942 the M-Aktion looted approximately 70,000 homes of French, Belgian, and Dutch Jews who had either fled or had been deported.

Artworks were inventoried separately, photographed, and transported to Germany. The M-Aktion art loot was separated into a number of special type-specific "M-A" collections: paintings and Oriental objets-d'art to weapons and rare books. Most of the Jeu de Paume "M-A" collections were first shipped to Kogl and Sessenberg, in Austria. Belgian collections went mostly to Nikolsburg, a special ERR art repository in Southern Moravia, then part of Austria. A final shipment of 1 August 1944, predominantly of modern art destined for Nikolsburg was stopped by French resistance and never left France.

In Paris alone, the "Einsatzstab Reichsleiter Rosenberg" combed through 38,000 Jewish homes. The Levitan Parisian department store served as an interim storage space before the looted furniture was transported to Germany.

== Dienststelle Westen ==
Kurt von Behr, was the head of the Western Office of the ERR (France, Belgium, and the Netherlands). Von Behr reported to the head of the ERR, Gerhard Utikal, served as "head of the Western Office.". At the same time, Behr was Chief of the Special Staff "Fine Arts" in the Western Office of the ERR until June 1943. Von Behr was a major perpetrator of the ERR's art theft in the West. The German staff of the office included about 80 male and 30 female officials and employees who belonged to the "Reich Ministry for the Occupied Eastern Territories." . In total, the M-Aktion staff probably numbered several thousand. Around 1500 French workers with 150 trucks worked daily to empty the looted Jewish apartments; 800 Jewish forced laborers interned in three work camps operated from July 1943 through August 1944 in the heart of Paris.

"The task of the internees in Austerlitz, Lévitan, and Bassano (technically sub-camps of Drancy) was to unload, sort, and crate for shipment to Germany property the Germans pillaged from Jewish apartments in Paris and (to a lesser extent) other cities in France". In addition, numerous police officers and workers were deployed to facilitate the transport.

The Western Service operated from 1942 onwards. In April, the first trains with looted Jewish goods left Paris for the East.

== Statistics concerning looting ==
According to the "Overall Performance Report to July 31, 1944" M-Aktion looting concerned:

- 69,619 Jewish apartments recorded, 69,512 complete apartments transported to bomb-damaged sites in Germany
- 26,984 freight train wagons required for this purpose
- further secured foreign exchange and securities to the value of RM11,695,516.
- also removed 2,191,352 kg of scrap metal, waste paper and textile materials.

In Antwerp, Jewish refugees' belongings, were taken away by barges. Hamburg, for example, received 45 shiploads of 27,227 tons of furniture, furnishings and clothing. Musical instruments were also massively looted from their Jewish owners.

== Beneficiaries of the looted Jewish property ==
The property looted from the Jews was collected in eleven "Reich camps" as reserves or sold directly to "air raid victims".

Alfred Rosenberg, who also became "Reich Minister for the Occupied Eastern Territories" as of July 1941, wanted to furnish German administrative offices in the East with the confiscated furniture and other items. SS divisions as well as the Reichsbahn and Reichspost were also supplied from the loot. Among the beneficiaries of luxury items were senior German generals including Heinz Guderian who furnished his Polish estate at Deipenhof with items stolen by M-Aktion. Many of the belongings seized from Jews were transferred to Germans who had lost their homes in air raid, war-disabled, large families and newlyweds. Also "Knight's Cross bearers" were allowed to claim "benefits from the M-Action. In some cases, there were also public auctions, which were announced in newspapers. All proceeds were paid to the Reichskasse.

Private-sector cooperation partners of the NS agencies, such as the freight forwarder Kühne + Nagel, also benefited from orders through the campaign.

== See also ==
- Aryanization
- Aktion 3
- Beutekunst (Zweiter Weltkrieg)
- Lager Lévitan
- Looted art

== Literature ==
- Quelle „Bericht über die M-Aktion der Dienststelle Westen vom August 1944“ = Dokument 188-L abgedruckt in: Der Prozeß gegen die Hauptkriegsverbrecher vor dem IMT – Nachdruck München 1989, ISBN 3-7735-2527-3, Band XXXVIII (= Dokumentenband 14), S. 25–32.
- Wolfgang Dreßen: Betrifft Aktion 3 – Deutsche verwerten jüdische Nachbarn. Aufbau-Verlag, Berlin 1998, ISBN 3-351-02487-8.
- Götz Aly: Hitlers Volksstaat. Frankfurt am Main 2005, ISBN 3-10-000420-5 (Kapitel: Unbürokratische Soforthilfe).
- Jean-Marc Dreyfus, Sarah Gensburger: Des camps dans Paris. Austerlitz, Lévitan, Bassano, juilet 1943 – août 1944. Paris 2003, ISBN 2-213-61707-4.
- Hanns Christian Löhr, Kunst als Waffe – Der Einsatzstab Reichsleiter Rosenberg, Ideologie und Kunstraub im „Dritten Reich“, Berlin 2018, S. 83 ff. ISBN 978-3-7861-2806-9.
- Margarete Rosenbohm-Plate: Hollandmöbel – Auslandsmöbel – Judenmöbel. In: Oldenburger Jahrbuch 103 (2003), S. 169–176.
- Christina Hemken: Der Einsatzstab Reichsleiter Rosenberg und die "M-Aktion". In: Christina Hemken/Karl-Heinz Ziessow: Im Schatten des totalen Krieges: Raubgut, Kriegsgefangenschaft und Zwangsarbeit. Cloppenburg 2018, S. 185–196.
