= Artistic Recovery Commission =

French public body of the Ministry of Education

The Artistic Recovery Commission (French: Commission de récupération artistique, or CRA) was a French public body of the Ministry of Education created on November 24, 1944, in order to process and return artworks and books plundered by the Nazis during the Occupation of France by Germany during World War II, discovered by the Allies after the defeat of Nazi Germany.

== History ==
=== Origins ===
During World War II, Nazis engaged in massive looting of territories occupied by the German army through Nazi looting organizations, notably the Einsatzstab Reichsleiter Rosenberg (ERR). In France, the number of works and objects of art looted by German forces during the Occupation is estimated at 100,000 pieces. These included paintings, sculptures, jewelry and furniture mainly stolen from Jewish families, who were targeted by anti-Jewish racial laws.

After the defeat of Germany, artworks that the Nazis had looted from France were discovered in Germany. Rose Valland, a conservation curator at the Jeu de Paume, played an important role in tracing, identifying and recovering the artworks looted by the ERR in France. The looted works were gathered in Central Collecting Points in Düsseldorf, Baden-Baden, Munich and Wiesbaden. Objects thought to have been looted from France were transferred by the Allied Monuments Men to France, for return to their original owners. In addition many books, archives and manuscripts were discovered in several repositories in France and in the other territories occupied by the Reich. Between 1.1 and 2 million looted books were found although the total number of these books in France was estimated at 20 million the day after the war.

Historians, art historians, librarians and experts travelled to Germany to examine the collections and send them back to their countries of origin. In order to process the works returned to France, the provisional government of the Republic set up a dedicated body: the Commission de récupération artistique, or CRA, was created on November 24, 1944, by an order of the Minister of National Education René Capitant at the request of Jacques Jaujard, director of the National Museums of France.

=== Functioning ===
Chaired by the art collector Albert Henraux, president of the Société des Amis du Louvre and vice-president of the Higher Council of Museums, the CRA then had seventeen members who could be assisted by experts appointed by the Ministry of Education. The number of members rose to thirty a few years later: among them are notably Jacques Jaujard, René Huygh and Rose Valland. Until August 1946, the organization was housed in the premises of the Jeu de Paume museum in Paris, the headquarters of the ERR during the war, before moving to avenue Rapp and rue de Montessuy in annexes of the Louvre Museum. The CRA is made up of two services:

- the service for the recovery of works of art, historical souvenirs, precious objects, period jewelry, directed by Michel Florisoone, curator at the Louvre, whose secretary is Rose Valland before she was sent on a mission to Germany;
- the sub-committee for the recovery of books, archives, manuscripts and autographs created on June 1, 1945, and chaired by Camille Bloch, honorary inspector general of libraries and archives, until his death in 1949 then by André Masson, inspector general of libraries: book return activities are supervised by Jenny Delsaux, librarian at the University of Paris.

The services of the CRA are in direct contact with other French authorities: the Office of Private Property and Interests (OBIP) of the Ministry of Foreign Affairs for property looted and found abroad or in Alsace-Moselle, and with the restitution service of the Ministry of Finance for those found in the rest of France. The role of the CRA is to provide its expertise to complete the declarations of spoliations made by the victims to the OBIP, the only administration required to receive the files.

When these files relate to cultural property, they are transmitted to the CRA which then estimates the value in francs of the property declared looted and then crosses the information in an attempt to locate it among the collections that have been found. The sub-committee for books is directly in charge of returning documents, although it reports to OBIP. The CRA publishes two catalogs of exhibitions that it has organized to present the objects found: in 1946, Masterpieces from French private collections found in Germany, then in 1949 Manuscripts and precious books found in Germany.

=== Dissolution ===
Even though the identification and restitution operations had not been completed, a decree of September 30, 1949 abolished the CRA on December 31, 1950. The OBIP resumed its powers and four "selection committees" were made responsible for processing unreturned collections.

To examine precious works, a "selection commission" for rare books and manuscripts was created by a decree of October 12, 1949. Numerous documents have been allocated to the Libraries Directorate of the Ministry of National Education and to the administration of the Domains which proceed to their allocation or their deposit in public libraries or university establishments: some 13,800 looted books deposited at the end of the operations of restitution to the owners in some forty French libraries between 1950 and 1953.

Among the 61,233 objects found at the end of the conflict, 45,441 were returned before 1950, to their owners or beneficiaries. Many owners could not be identified, 12,463 works are sold by the administration of the Domains while 2,143 others are deposited with the National Museums or other museums after having been presented to the public at the Château de Compiègne from 1950 to 1954: these works have since been considered as National Salvage Museums and designated by the acronym "MNR".

The archives are held by France Archives.

== Bibliography ==
- Delsaux, Jenny (1976). La sous-commission des livres à la récupération artistique: 1944-1950. Paris: [éditeur inconnu]. p. 63.
- Jouan, Ophélie (2019). Rose Valland: Une vie à l'œuvre. Paris: Musée de la Résistance et de la Déportation de l'Isère, Maison des Droits de l'Homme. p. 95. ISBN 978-2-35567-139-5.
- Jouan, Ophélie. Les officiers Beaux-Arts et la récupération artistique française dans les territoires de l’ancien Reich (1944 – 1949). Master thesis (dir. Laurence Bertrand Dorléac), Paris, École du Louvre, 2015, 312 p.
- Anne Liskenne, « Autour des restitutions des biens culturels de 1944 à nos jours », dans Alexandre Sumpf et Vincent Laniol, Saisies, spoliations et restitutions : archives et bibliothèques au XXe siècle, Rennes, Presses universitaires de Rennes, 2012. ISBN 978-2-7535-1996-1, p. 313–325.
- Lorentz, Claude (1998). La France et les restitutions allemandes au lendemain de la Seconde Guerre mondiale: 1943-1954. Paris: Direction des archives et de la documentation - Ministère des Affaires étrangères. pp. XXI-348. ISBN 2-11-089157-2.
- Poulain, Martine (2008). Livres pillés, lectures surveillées: les bibliothèques françaises sous l'Occupation. Paris: Gallimard. p. 753. ISBN 978-2-07-045397-9.
- Poulain, Martine (2015). "De mémoire de livres". Bulletin des bibliothèques de France (4): 176–190. ISSN 1292-8399.
- Poulain, Martine (2019). Où sont les bibliothèques spoliées par les nazis ?. Villeurbanne: École nationale supérieure des sciences de l'information et des bibliothèques. p. 231. ISBN 978-2-37546-106-8.
- Sprang, Philippe (24 January 2017). "Enquête intégrale". L'Obs. ISSN 0029-4713..

== See also ==
- The Holocaust in France
- Einsatzstab Reichsleiter Rosenberg
- Musées nationaux récupération
- List of claims for restitution for Nazi-looted art
