= Gustav Rochlitz =

Gustav Rochlitz (1889–1972) was a German art dealer of Paris and Baden-Baden who was a key figure in the looting of art during the Second World War by the Nazis. He acted as an official agent of the Einsatzstab Reichsleiter Rosenberg. Rochlitz figures prominently in the OSS Art Looting Intelligence Unit (ALIU) Reports 1945-1946 and ALIU Red Flag Names List and Index, which published a thirteen-page Detailed Intelligence Report (DIR) on his spoliation activities.
