= Hörster Bach =

River in Germany

Location
- Country: Germany
- States: North Rhine-Westphalia

Physical characteristics
- Mouth
  - location: Rethlager Bach
  - coordinates: 51°57′14″N 8°46′58″E

Basin features
- Progression: Rethlager Bach→ Werre→ Weser→ North Sea

Hörster Bach is a small river of North Rhine-Westphalia, Germany. It is 3.9 km long and flows into the Rethlager Bach near Lage.

== See also ==
- List of rivers of North Rhine-Westphalia
