= Gottlieb Reber =

Swiss art dealer and art collector

Study of Gottlieb Reber by Max Beckmann, 1928.

Gottlieb Friedrich Reber (23 March 1880 – 15 July 1959) was a German art collector and dealer who was involved with the trade in looted art during the Second World War.

== Early life ==
Reber was born in Lage, Lippe, Germany. His father was an evangelist pastor. After his schooling, he entered the textile industry in Bremen and Hamburg ca 1900 before starting his own successful business in Langerfeld, near Cologne, which enable him to indulge his passion for art—particularly that of modern French artists—which he claimed to have studied at the University of Bonn. In 1906, he married Erna Sander (b. 15 October 1885 in Langerfeld, Schwelm), the daughter of a textile manufacturer from Barmen. He served briefly in the German army in 1916. Reber and his wife and daughter, Gisela, left Germany for Lausanne, Switzerland, in 1923. Between 1929 and 1933, the Rebers lived between France, Germany and Switzerland. Reber left Germany permanently in 1933.

== Art dealing ==
A prolific patron of the Cubists, Reber's fortune suffered following the stockmarket crash in 1929, and from the 'thirties he was forced to sell many of his artworks. During this period he worked in conjunction with Walter Hofer, Hofer beginning as his gallery assistant. Reber met Walter Andreas Hofer in 1929 through Hofer's brother-in-law Kurt Walter Bachstitz, a (formerly Jewish) artist, collector, dealer and gallerist. Hofer became associated with Reichsmarschal Goering from 1938, and was made director of Goering's Art Purchasing Commission around 1940. In this capacity, he commissioned Reber to Italy on 23 March 1941 to purchase artworks for Goering. Reber duly set up in Florence until 1944, in partnership with Dr Ingeborg Eichmann (later Ingeborg Pudelko-Eichmann), a Czech art dealer who too had removed from Switzerland. Although believed to be a Nazi sympathizer, on 12 March 1943 Reber's German citizenship was revoked, mainly for his high-ranking activity in German Freemasonry, which he refused to relinquish, but also (he claimed) for speaking out against the treatment of French Jews, and for his proclivity for collecting the radical modernists. By early 1945, he was expelled from Florence and under house arrest at Avellino, under orders of the Questura at Naples, his re-entry visa to Switzerland having been refused by the Swiss authorities. On being questioned by an Allied Field Security officer in 1945, Reber claimed that the most important deal he arranged in Florence, via Hofer, was approximately twenty million lire-worth of Conte Alessandro Contini-Bonacossi's paintings.

== Later life ==
Reber died in Lausanne in 1959.
