= Boitel =

1. A Boitel (noun) was a unity of measure used in Beauvais (France-Picardy) during the 14th century. It corresponded to three English gallons (dry).

2. Boitel is a surname, and may refer to:

- Guillaume Boitel, companion of Bertrand du Guesclin,
- Jeanne Boitel (1904–1987), French actress
- Maurice Boitel (1919–2007), French painter
- Pedro Luis Boitel (1931–1972), Cuban poet and dissident
- Achille Boitel, French businessman.

3.Boitel: other uses:

- The Boitel was a small car exhibited at the Paris Motor Show in 1946, 1947 and 1948, shortly after which the manufacturer ran out of money.
