= Hans Wendland =

German art dealer

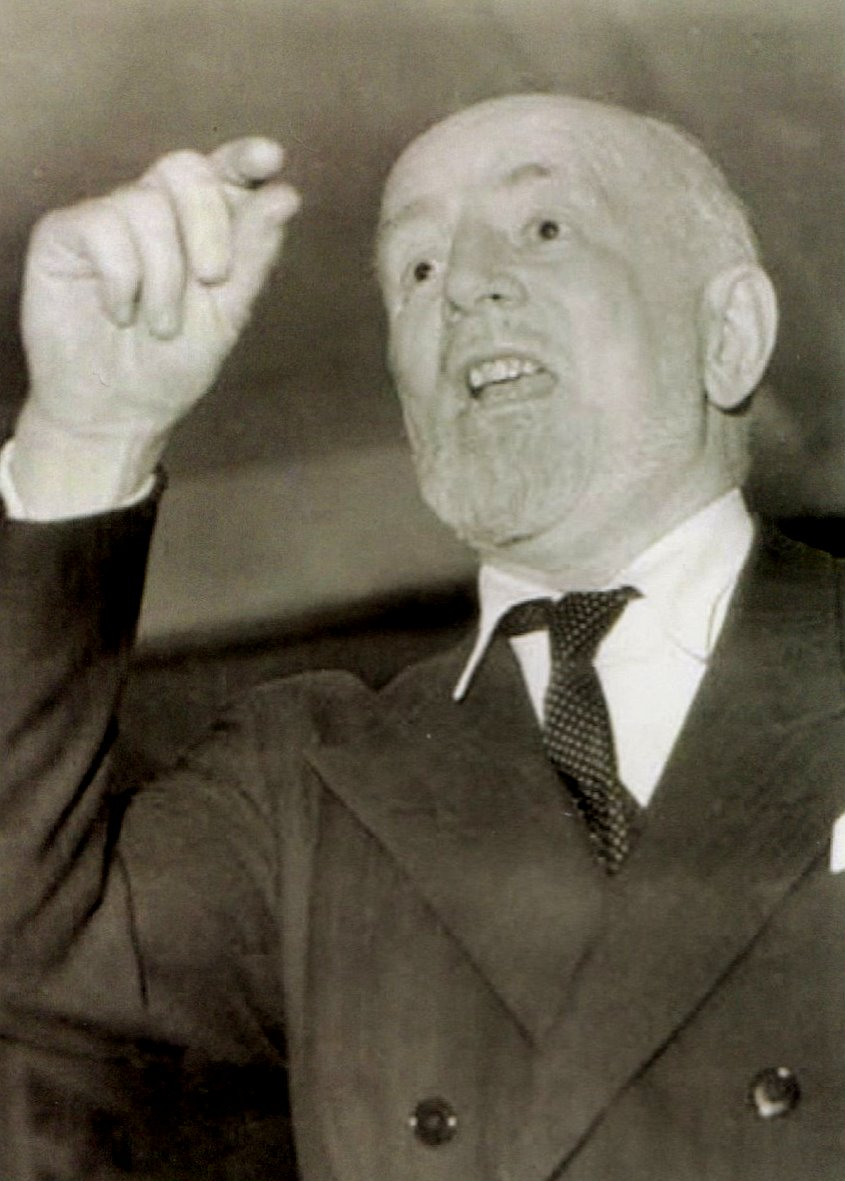
Hans Otto Carl Wendland

Dr. Hans Otto Carl Wendland (born 28 December 1880) was a German art dealer who was implicated in the trade in art looted by the Nazi regime during World War II. Among his key contacts were the French industrialist and collaborator Achille Boitel, Hugo Engel, Allen Loebl, Yves Perdoux and others in Paris and Charles Montag, Théodore Fischer, Alexander von Frey and Albert Skira in Switzerland.

== Early life ==
Hans Wendland was born in Neu Ruppin, 28 December 1880, into a middleclass Prussian family of eight children. He studied art at the University of Berlin and obtained his doctorate in 1906.

According to the Detailed Interrogation Report, he was dismissed in 1909 from the service of the Kaiser Friedrich Museum for "selling for personal profit works of art obtained in Persia while on a museum expedition".

In 1912 he married Agnes Schloettke. In the First World War he served in the German army, was wounded, returned to Berlin where he worked as an art dealer. In 1918 he was sent to Moscow as an Attache of the German Embassy and "profited during the Communist Revolution by purchasing art at a low price from the fleeing nobility".

In 1920 Wendland moved to Switzerland and in 1933 he moved to Paris, divorcing his first wife and marrying a second wife 34 years his junior. Their son, Hans, was born in 1938. In 1939, on the even of World War II, he moved back to Switzerland.

== Role in Nazi looting ==
A German art dealer in Switzerland and Nazi party member since 1942, he was a key dealer in Nazi looted art. He is mentioned 43 times in the Art Looting Intelligence Unit (ALIU) Reports 1945-1946 and ALIU Red Flag Names List and Index. He played a key role during World War II in the trade of stolen artworks in France, Germany, and Switzerland. He acted as the main purchasing agent between Walter Andreas Hofer, the director of Hermann Göring's art collection, and Swiss dealer, Theodor Fischer, who wanted to conceal his dealing in looted art but nonetheless facilitated purchases by the Zurich industrialist Emil Georg Bührle.

During the German occupation, he regularly spent time in Paris and traded in works of art that had been confiscated by Reichsleiter Rosenberg's task force. He maintained contact with colleagues such as Karl Haberstock, Wolfgang Gurlitt, Bruno Lohse, Gustav Rochlitz, Allen and Manon Loebl, Paul Pétridès, Victor Mandl and Adolf Wüster. The sometimes speculative barter and investment transactions went on for years and reached such an extent that the FBI investigated the company in the early 1940s for violating neutrality and espionage.

=== Detailed Interrogation Report Hans Wendland 18 September 1946 ===
On 18 September 1946, Otto Wittman, Jr. and Bernard Taper of the OSS Art Looting Intelligence Unit and the MFAA (also known as the Monuments Men) submitted the Detailed Interrogation Report on the HANS WENDLAND. The report, marked confidential, detailed Wendland's "personal history", his "dealings and dealer relations", his "traffic in confiscated art", and his "personal assets". Concerning Nazi art looting, they presented Wendland as "the most important German figure whose base of operations was a neutral country - Switzerland"

Wendland was arrested in Rome by the American Forces on 25 July 1946 and transferred for joint interrogation on 31 August 1946 to Wannsee Internment Camp, near Berlin. Otto Wittmann and Bernard Tapper interrogated him from September 5 to 15, 1946.

==== Selected Findings ====
- During the Nazi occupation, Wendland "made his headquarters at the Ritz" in Paris.
- He guided French dealers who wanted to do business with the occupying Germans "formed an informal syndicate of the French dealers, Boitel, Perdoux, and Loebl"
- During the war Wendland "made six trips to France in 1941 and 1942, and one trip in 1943".
- Wendland was "a close friend of Buehrle, the Oerlikon arms manufacturer"

==== Classified Secret, and rediscovery in the 1990s ====
When, after a half century of secrecy, the Art Looting Investigation Unit reports began to reemerge in the late 1990s, The Associated Press described Wendland as "a leading fence for paintings looted from Jews".

== Art looted from Jewish collectors ==
Wendland traded in art stolen from many Jewish art collectors plundered by Nazis including Georges Bernheim, Friedrich Gutmann, Henry and Hertha Bromberg, Alfred Weinberger and many others, many of whom were murdered in the Holocaust. These Nazi looted artworks have turned up in museums around the world. Landscape with chimneys (Landschaft mit Schornsteinen) by Edgar Degas was found by the heirs of Friedrich Gutmann in the collection of Daniel Searle, a trustee at the Art Institute of Chicago with a false provenance which required a long and contentious lawsuit to elucidate. It was transferred by Hans Wendland and Fritz Fankhauser to Switzerland – before being sold to the New York collector Emile Wolf.

The German Lost Art Foundation lists twenty objects that explicitly mention Wendland. The French database: "Cultural Plunder by the Einsatzstab Reichsleiter Rosenberg: Database of Art Objects at the Jeu de Paume" lists 44 artworks that mention Wendland.

The whereabouts of many of these artworks is not known today.
