= Kurt Walter Bachstitz =

Austrian-Dutch art dealer (1882–1949)

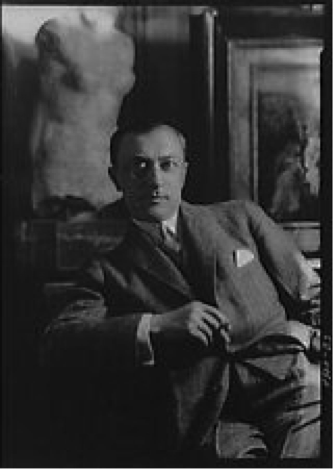
Portrait of Kurt Walter Bachstitz by Arnold Genthe, 1923.

Kurt Walter Bachstitz (4 October 1882 – 28 May 1949 in The Hague) was a German-Austrian art dealer. He died shortly before his naturalization to the Netherlands.

== General Information ==
=== Until emigration 1938 ===
Bachstitz was born as the child of the Jewish couple Liber Jacob Bachstitz and Mathilde Markowitz. His place of birth is arguable. All contemporary sources mention the formerly German Breslau (the present-day Polish Wrocław) as his place of birth. But Bachstitz requested for himself the Austrian village Raipoltenbach as his place of birth when he claimed at the U.S. Department of Labor for an extension of his temporary stay in 1931. He studied architecture in Paris, London and Vienna where he finished his studies with a diploma. On the outbreak of the First World War he was called up for military service and served between 1914 and 1918 as an officer, lastly in the rank of a troop captain. He served actively in the field until 1916, when he was severely wounded. He married Elfriede Pesé (died in 1918) with whom he had two children – a son Walter Werner Michael who died in 1943 by tuberculosis in Switzerland and a daughter, Margit Martha who died in South Africa in 1981. On 19 December 1918 he married his second wife Elisa ("Lilly") Emma Hofer. Lilly was a Protestant. Because of her Bachstitz converted to the evangelic faith. In 1919 he apparently lived and traded in Munich. In his diary Thomas Mann wrote about a meeting in Bachstitz' Munich apartment, where Mann bought a work from Bachstitz. He described him quite prerogatively as a "blond-Jewish" example of an "international culture-capitalistic profiteer". In 1920 he established an art dealership in the Hague named Kunsthandel K.W. Bachstitz (Bachstitz Gallery N.V.). Surinamestraat 11, He lived in Vienna and in Berlin and he created an internationally known company with art galleries in The Hague, New York City and Berlin. Lilly was the sister of art dealer Walter Andreas Hofer who had managed the Gallery in The Hague for a while and subsequently became an art buyer for Hermann Göring.

In 1937 Bachstitz waived his Austrian citizenship. In 1938 the couple moved to The Hague.

=== World War II ===
Between the beginning of the German occupation in 1940 and 1941 Bachstitz sold a number of paintings to the "Sonderauftrag Linz" that was run by Hitler's Special Representative of the planned 'Führermuseum' in Linz, Hans Posse until his death in 1942.

Among the works sold to the Sonderauftrag were the following:

- Ferdinand Bol "The Angel of the Lord appears unto Gideon" NK 2484
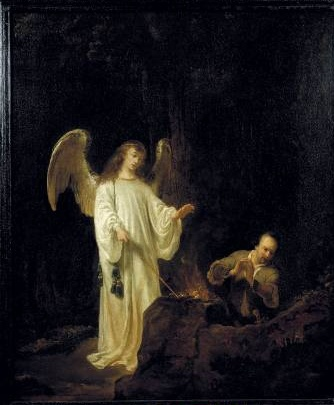
  Ferdinand Bol "The Angel of the Lord appears unto Gideon" NK 2484
- Stephan Godl "Adam and Eve" NK 636-a-b

The correspondence between Bachstitz and Posse concerning these works is preserved. Posse achieved high price reductions.

- Greek / Tanagra Figure "Standing Woman" NK 620; RMO, Leiden; CCP-Database
- Girolamo da Santa Croce "Saint John the Baptist" NK 1627
- German (Cologne) "A small altar with saints and two scenes" NK 2707
- German (also Alpian) "St. Mary and St. John before the Crucifixion" NK 1552
- Greek Snake Bracelets NK 864-a-b
- Greek Carnelian Engraved Gem 2904
- Gerrit Berckheyde "Grote Markt with Cathedral St. Bavo in Haarlem" NK 2581; CCP-Database; Frans Hals Museum, Haarlem
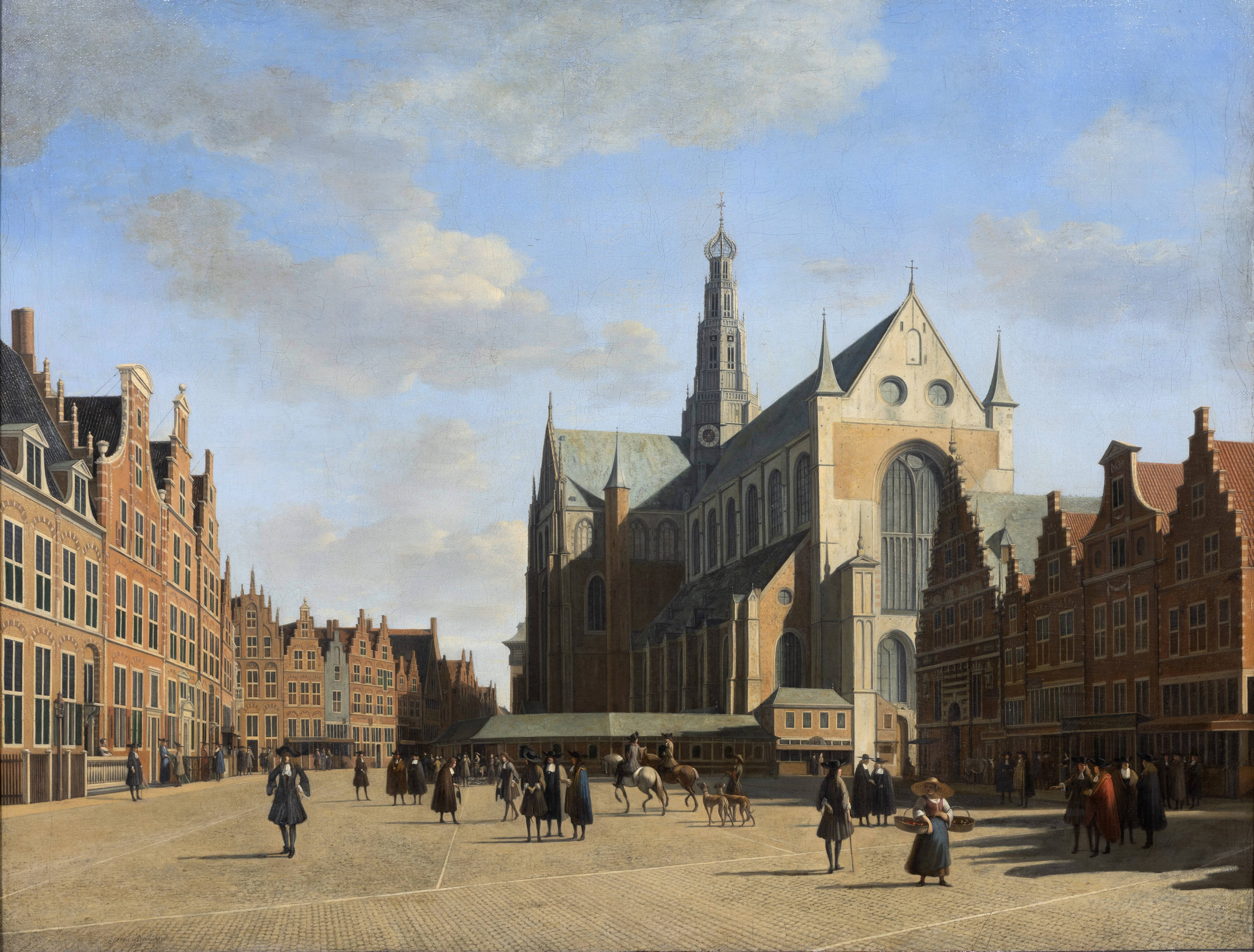
  Gerrit Berckheyde "Grote Markt with Cathedral St. Bavo in Haarlem" NK 2581
- Alexander Colin "Heavenly Apparition over a Town" NK 631
- Canaletto (copy after) "The return of the Bucintoro to the Molo on Ascension day" NK 1798
- Jan van Scorel "St. Paul" NK 2919
- Pietro Cappelli "Roman Capriccio" NK 1892
- Greek Golden bracelet with Serapis head, 1st century NK 865/CCP-Database, RMO, Leiden
- Surrounding of Giovanni di Francesco del Cervelliera Frame NK1787
- François Duquesnoy "Cupido" (attribution: Venice, 16th century) CCP-Database
- Greek "standing woman 'the night' (Nyx)" CCP-Database; Getty Villa Malibu

In February 1941 Bachstitz officially resigned as supervisory director of the Bachstitz Gallery and his wife became the managing director. Together with his wife, he continued to provide a clandestine management role. In this way, they avoided having the Gallery placed under the forced administration for the duration of the war. According to the documents in the file concerning his successful application to become a Dutchman after the war the couple provided undercover protection for Jews trying to escape the authorities.

In 1942 Bachstitz was summoned by the occupation authority (the "Wirtschaftsamt") as he had failed to register the gallery as "non-Aryan property". Proceedings were commenced against him and he was arrested by the Sicherheitsdienst (SD) in July 1943 and imprisoned in the Scheveningen prison in The Hague. Due to an intervention of Göring initiated by Bachstitz' brother-in-law Hofer, he was released from prison. He was then also exempted from wearing the Star of David. Furthermore, the couple had their marriage dissolved in September 1943 to prevent the confiscation of the gallery by the occupying authority.

Between 1942 und 1944 Bachstitz sold a number of works to the museums that were run by Kurt Martin, the head of the Museums of the Upper Rhine (Alsace and Baden) under Robert Heinrich Wagner.

In 1944 Bachstitz managed to obtain permission to leave the Netherlands and he emigrated to Switzerland, again with the help of Andreas Hofer.

As a bribe for the exit visa Bachstitz had to hand over art to Hermann Göring, namely a painting with the Samson and Delilah motive by Jan Steen, as well two antique necklaces.

=== After the war - successful and unsuccessful restitution efforts ===
After the war the Allies returned most of the art that the gallery had sold to German authorities to the Netherlands. The Netherlands restituted the painting by Jan Steen but rejected an application for the restitution of the other works. They became part of the Collection of the Stichting Nederlands Kunstbezit (SNK). Kurt Walter Bachsitz and Lilly Bachstitz-Hofer were again registered as officially married. Kurt Walter Bachstitz died in 1949. In 1951 his widow liquidated the Bachstitz Gallery N.V. with a high deficit. The gallery's art library was auctioned off.

In 2009 the Dutch government restituted the painting "Roman Capriccio" by Pietro Capelli from the stock of the SNK to Bachstitz' grandchildren. However, the Restitution Committee of the Netherlands denied restitution of a number of other works, among them the works sold to Hitler (Sonderauftrag Linz). Regarding most of these works, the Committee ruled that these sales had not been made under duress because Bachstitz had been left "undisturbed" in 1940 and 1941. The grandchildren applied in 2013 for the re-opening of the case in this regard.

In July 2013 the Prussian Heritage Foundation restituted a Tyrolean gothic wall-mounted writing slate (c. 1500) and a large 16th-century Italian bronze mortar. Bachstitz' grandchildren are still searching for many works of art that were lost due to National-Socialist persecution.

== See also ==
- Wilhelm Mautner
- Jacques Goudstikker
- Friedrich Gutmann
- Franz Koenigs
- Fritz Mannheimer
