= Alessandro Contini-Bonacossi =

Italian art collector, dealer, and politician (1878–1955)

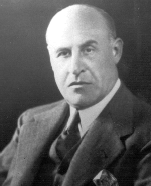
- Born: March 18, 1878
- Died: October 22, 1955 (aged 77)

Count Alessandro Contini-Bonacossi (18 March 1878 – 22 October 1955) was an Italian politician, art collector, dealer, and philatelist. In 1939 he was made a Senator of the Kingdom of Italy by Victor Emmanuel III.

== Early life ==
Contini-Bonacossi was born in Ancona on 18 March 1878 to Camillo Contini and the Countess Elena Bonacossi Bermudez of Ferrara.

== Political career ==
In 1928, Contini-Bonacossi was made a Count by Victor Emmanuel III. In 1939 he became a Senator.

== Nazi era ==
Through Walter Hofer, Contini-Bonacossi sourced art for the Göring Collection.

Around 1942, Göring's art agent Sepp Angerer, and the local German consul Gerhard Wolf, went on a tour of Contini-Bonacossi's collection. Angerer supposedly told the count, "What a pity you're not a Jew!" and drawing a finger across his throat continued "If you were a Jew, we could do just that! And all the paintings would be ours!"

Contini-Bonacossi was investigated in 1946 by the Office of Strategic Services Art Looting Investigation Unit for his role in dealing in Nazi-looted art and placed on the Red Flag List of Names.

== Philately ==
Contini-Bonacossi was a noted philatelist. He won a Gold-Silver medal at the London International Stamp Exhibition 1960 for his display of Tuscany and a gold medal at WIPA 1965, also for Tuscany.

== Death ==
Contini-Bonacossi died in Florence on 22 October 1955.
