= Dolores (Ziegfeld girl) =

English model (1892–1975)

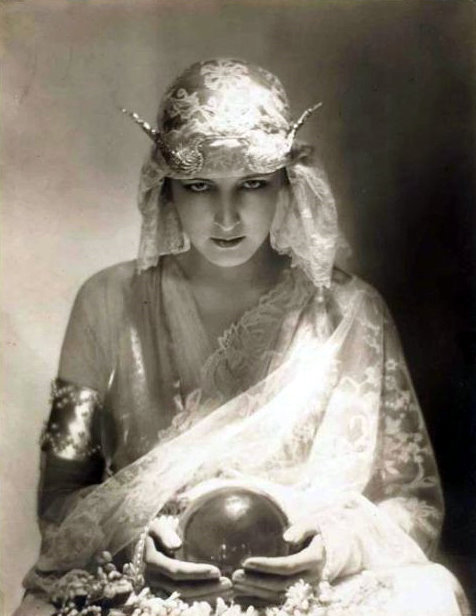
- Dolores with a Mercury headdress and a crystal ball in a wedding dress spread for Vogue, 1919. Photographer: Adolph de Meyer.
- Born: Kathleen Mary Rose; 26 September 1893; Wimbledon, England
- Died: 7 November 1975 (aged 82); Paris, France
- Occupation: Model

Dolores or Rose Dolores (born Kathleen Mary Rose; 26 September 1893 – 7 November 1975) was an English model. She is recognised as the first celebrity clothes model and has been credited with inventing the blank hauteur of the modern fashion model. Florenz Ziegfeld, Jr. called her "the loveliest showgirl in the world". She was known for her commanding stage presence and became the star of the Ziegfeld Follies from 1917 until her retirement in 1923. She lived the rest of her life in Paris and during the Second World War helped Allied airmen escape the German occupation.

== Early life ==
Kathleen Rose was born in Wimbledon, near London, on 26 September 1893. Her father was Harry Rose (born Northleigh, Oxfordshire), a former police officer, and her mother was Ellen Ann ("Nellie") Rose (born Vauxhall, London), a dressmaker. Kathleen had a sister, Eva Alice Rose (1890–1973). Newspaper reports say that Kathleen was born into poverty and in the 1901 England Census, Harry is shown without occupation. In the 1911 return he is marked as "Paralized 20 years". The family had two boarders and a visitor living with them at the time of the 1901 census when they were at 61 Russell Road, Wimbledon. Kathleen was not living with her parents at the time of the 1911 census.

Around 1910, Kathleen started work for the fashion designer Lucy, Lady Duff-Gordon. Newspaper reports, which may not be reliable, say she started as an errand girl after being forced to leave school, presumably for financial reasons. Lady Duff-Gordon recognised that Kathleen's height of at least 6 feet (180 cm), elegant figure and blonde hair, made her an ideal clothes model. She trained Kathleen as one of her mannequins (models) and renamed her "Dolores". Duff-Gordon later described Dolores as the best mannequin that she ever had. Dolores was photographed wearing Duff-Gordon's creations in Paris in 1912, the same year the designer and her husband, Sir Cosmo Duff-Gordon, survived the ill-fated maiden voyage of the RMS Titanic.

== Ziegfeld years ==
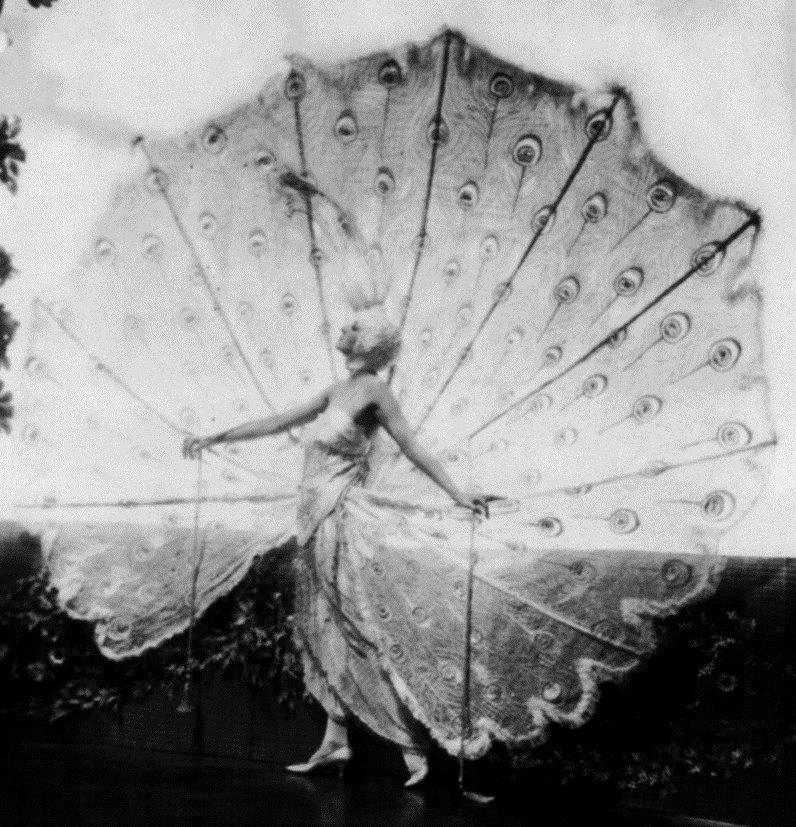
The peacock costume, 1919

During the First World War, Duff-Gordon's focus shifted to her New York office which she had opened in 1910. For her New York fashion shows she imported her own models from England, although Dolores was not among the first she brought over. The shows became so popular that she had to start holding them in a theatre. It was probably at one such event around 1916 that Florenz Ziegfeld and his wife Billie Burke discovered Duff-Gordon's designs and her model Dolores. Ziegfeld was enraptured by Dolores and the luxurious spectacle of the show and Burke ordered two of Duff-Gordon's creations. Soon, Duff-Gordon was making costumes for Ziegfeld's theatrical productions, the Ziegfeld Follies.

Ziegfeld decided to base a scene in his next Follies on one of Duff-Gordon's fashion shows and to use Duff-Gordon's girls to model the clothes. Duff-Gordon warned, "But they do not know how to sing or dance, let alone talk." Ziegfeld assured her that all they had to do was walk and wear the clothes. Thus was invented the Show Girl, whose job, unlike the Chorus Girl, was simply to be beautiful and to model clothes. The Duff-Gordon models were already trained in the Lucile Slither to which Ziegfeld added the Ziegfeld Walk, which enabled a girl to descend a staircase in full costume in such a way as to accentuate her natural attributes without appearing ungainly.

The fashion scene was only part of the show, however, which continued to have comedians, singers and dancers, and Duff-Gordon's models were not mentioned as principal players on the bill.

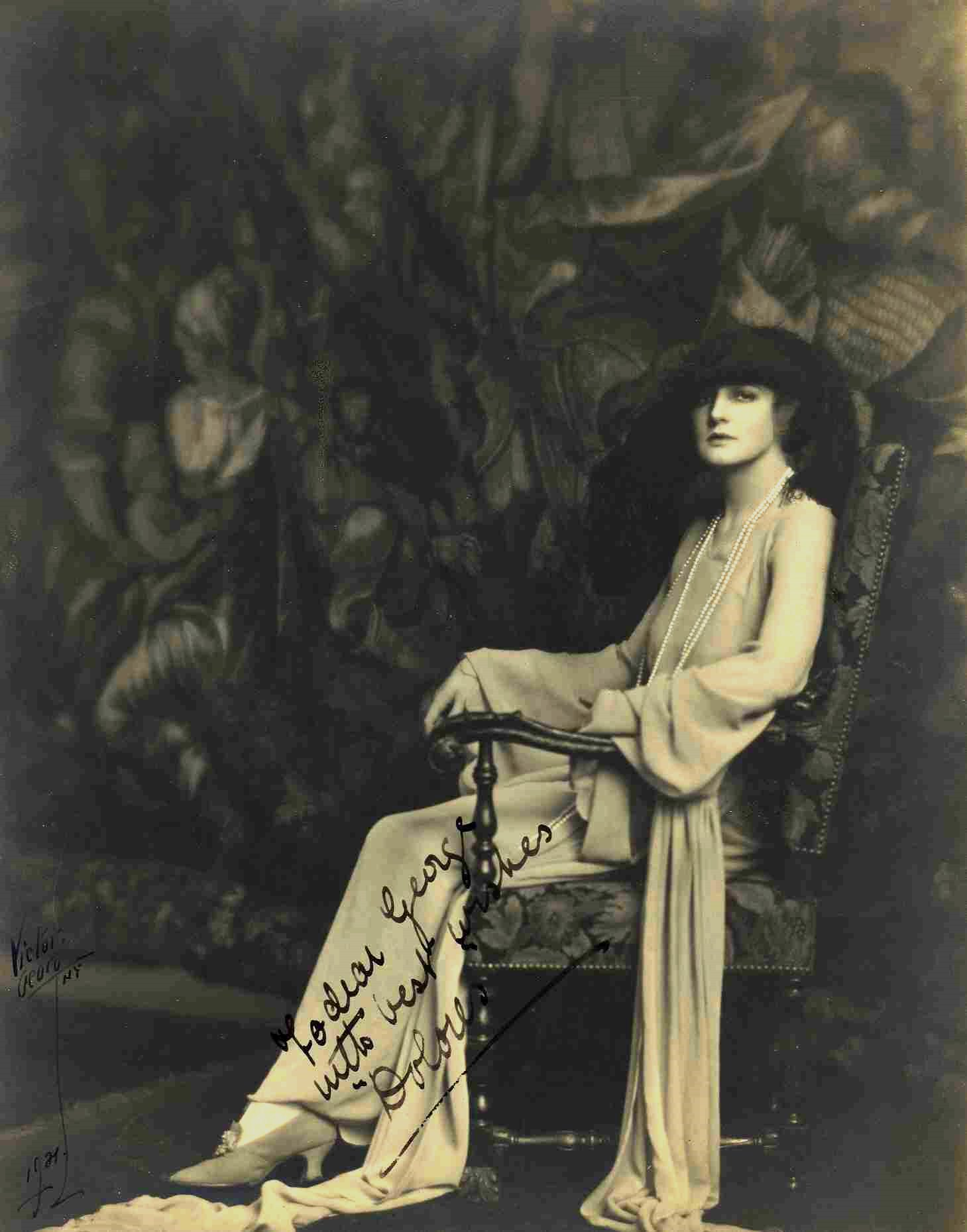
Dolores. Photographer: Victor Georg, 1921

=== Appearances ===
Dolores' first appearance for Ziegfeld was in the Ziegfeld Follies of 1917 in which she played the Empress of Fashion in the "Ladies of Fashion, An Episode in Chiffon". As the tallest and most stately, Dolores came on last in a parade of nine girls in chiffon gowns of varying degrees of transparency. Her dress was known as "The Discourager of Hesitancy" in accordance with Duff-Gordon's practice of giving her gowns provocative names.

In Midnight Frolic of 1919, Dolores played the part of The White Peacock in the Tropical Birds number. She wore a 10 feet (3.0 m) high peacock costume designed by Pascaud of Paris which Marjorie Farnsworth described as "one of the loveliest costumes ever seen on Broadway". According to one reviewer, a member of the audience asked another, "Is she going to dance?" to which the reply came, "A woman who can stand and walk like that doesn't have to dance." The idea of a peacock costume was not new as Anna Held had worn one in Follow Me in 1916 but it was Dolores who made it her own. Gertrude Hoffmann wore a similar costume in 1920.

Dolores, like the other former mannequins, was only required to walk and pose when on stage. It was said that she never smiled during an appearance. In 1920, however, she had her first speaking part in the musical comedy Sally, where she played the minor role of Mrs Ten Broek. It is not recorded whether she was required to smile during the performance.

As Dolores' fame grew, so did her earnings. When she started with Ziegfeld, she earned $75 per week but by 1923 this had risen to $500 per week. In October 1920 she was able to travel first class on the RMS Aquitania between Britain and America with her sister. In August 1922, the sisters made the same trip on the RMS Olympic, sister ship of the RMS Titanic. She was the subject of syndicated articles that appeared in newspapers across America, often praising her beauty in the most effusive and florid terms. One article claimed her beauty was "acclaimed in every civilized land" and there were geometric diagrams demonstrating the perfect symmetry of her face.

=== Style ===
Dolores had a laconic and androgynous beauty, and a haughty demeanor on stage that had been cultivated by Duff-Gordon and was naturally aided by Dolores' height. It was said that Duff-Gordon had trained her to act like a Duchess. Diana Vreeland commented, "I remember his [Ziegfeld's] girls so vividly. Dolores was the greatest of them – a totally Gothic English beauty. She was very highly paid just to walk across the stage – and the whole place would go to pieces. It was a good walk I can tell you – it had such fluidity and grace. Everything I know about walking comes from watching Ziegfeld's girls."

=== Influence ===
The principal attribute that Dolores brought to the Follies was not beauty but attitude. She didn't sing or dance and she didn't speak on stage until later in her career, but the combination of Duff-Gordon's costumes, Ziegfeld's staging and Dolores' commanding stage presence has been seen as influencing the performances of generations of American showgirls, from Josephine Baker up to the modern day. Of Duff-Gordon's models generally, Randolph Carter has said that their "regal manner and astonishing hauteur were helpful in maintaining proper decorum at the Midnight Frolic [1918 etc.] where liquor flowed rather freely". Of Dolores specifically, it has been said that her unsmiling "blank hauteur" was the template for the performance style of the modern fashion model.

== Marriage ==
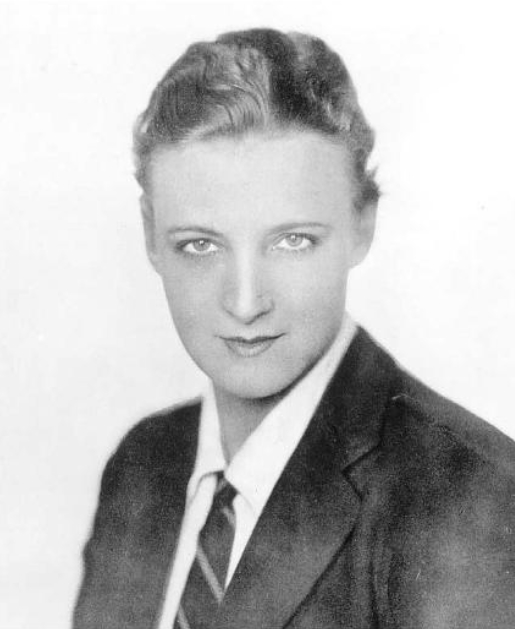
Mrs Tudor Wilkinson. Eve, The Lady's Pictorial, 1925.

On 15 May 1923, Dolores married the St. Louis art collector Tudor Wilkinson in Paris and retired from the stage. The ceremony took place in the mairie of the first arrondissement and later at the oratory of the Louvre. Mr and Mrs Dudley Field Malone were the witnesses. In 1925, the American press reported that the couple lived on the Île Saint-Louis in a house overlooking Notre-Dame Cathedral, most likely the three-storey apartment at 18 Quai d'Orleans referred to in later sources.

After her marriage, Dolores adopted the severe masculine style of dress and hair popular at that time, appearing in Eve, The Lady's Pictorial in 1925 in a suit jacket and tie. The mannish appearance, uncharacteristic (in photographs) half-smile, and the knowing look in the picture has caused later commentators to wonder whether Dolores was signalling that she was a lesbian, but there is no evidence to suggest that she was and her appearance at this time may simply have been a fashion statement. The photograph appeared, slightly changed, on the cover of Fashioning Sapphism: The Origins of a Modern English Lesbian Culture by Laura Doan in 2013.

== World War II ==
Paris was occupied by the Germans during World War II. Many Allied citizens were interned, and Dolores (born in England and married to an American) was detained at the German internment camp at Vittel. The exact dates of her detention are unknown, and it is possible that Dolores did not spend her whole detention at Vittel. Vittel was a former hotel and spa, and relatively comfortable as internment camps went.

Tudor Wilkinson, as far as is known, was not detained. After the war, the American Office of Strategic Services Art Looting Investigation Unit wrote that he kept a watch on the Paris art market for Sepp Angerer, Hermann Göring's art agent, and that Dolores had been released from Vittel after Göring made a personal visit to the Wilkinsons' apartment. In his life of Göring, David Irving wrote that the visit took place in 1940, and that Wilkinson wrote to Göring a year later to thank him for interceding, and telling him that he should keep a painting of Juliana von Stolberg that he had admired in their apartment: "We both agreed that we wanted you to have 'Juliana' always, to thank you for what you so modestly did for [us]." In 1946, Tudor Wilkinson was placed on the OSS "red flag" list of people and organisations that were involved in the art trade under the Nazis, with the caveat that police reports indicated that he was active in the Resistance.

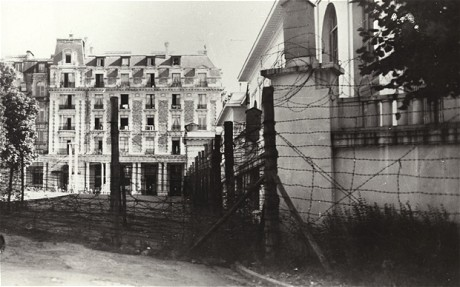
Vittel internment camp, France

According to the memoirs of Drue Tartière, Dolores and Tudor Wilkinson were both heavily involved in the Resistance. Tartière had also been in Vittel, and had managed to obtain a release on the false grounds that she was dying of cancer. She went on to help smuggle at least 42 Allied airmen out of occupied territory. She wrote that a short wave radio had been concealed at 18 Quai d'Orléans so that the Resistance could communicate with London, and machine guns were hidden behind the fireplace and elsewhere in the apartment. Tudor Wilkinson's secretary, who had been a professor at the Sorbonne, was active in organising sabotage by railway workers.

Even after the Americans liberated Paris, the situation in the city remained dangerous in the first few days. Isolated German units and snipers continued to be active. Dolores' sister Eva was shot in the stomach while standing in front of a window in the Wilkinsons' apartment. On the evening of the same day, there was a German bombing raid, and the apartment was hit by multiple incendiary bombs that started several fires. The Wilkinsons and Drue Tartière managed to throw the bombs out of the window or smother them in sand. As they were doing so, a large bomb exploded near Notre Dame and water from the Seine splashed their faces. Dolores collapsed with a "heart attack" and her husband was burned on the arms and legs when he tried to extinguish an incendiary with water. The situation outside was just as bad, with whole buildings collapsing from fire while German snipers shot and killed French firefighters attending to the blazes. Tartière left Paris immediately after this attack, and her account provides no later information about the Wilkinsons or whether Eva survived her injuries.

== Death ==
Dolores died in Paris on 7 November 1975.

== Selected stage appearances ==
- Ziegfeld Follies of 1917
- Miss 1917
- Fleurette's Dream (1917)
- Ziegfeld Follies of 1918
- Midnight Frolic of 1918
- Midnight Frolic of 1919
- Ziegfeld Nine O'Clock Review (1919)
- Midnight Frolic of 1920
- Sally (1920)
