= Friedrich Gutmann =

Dutch banker and art collector

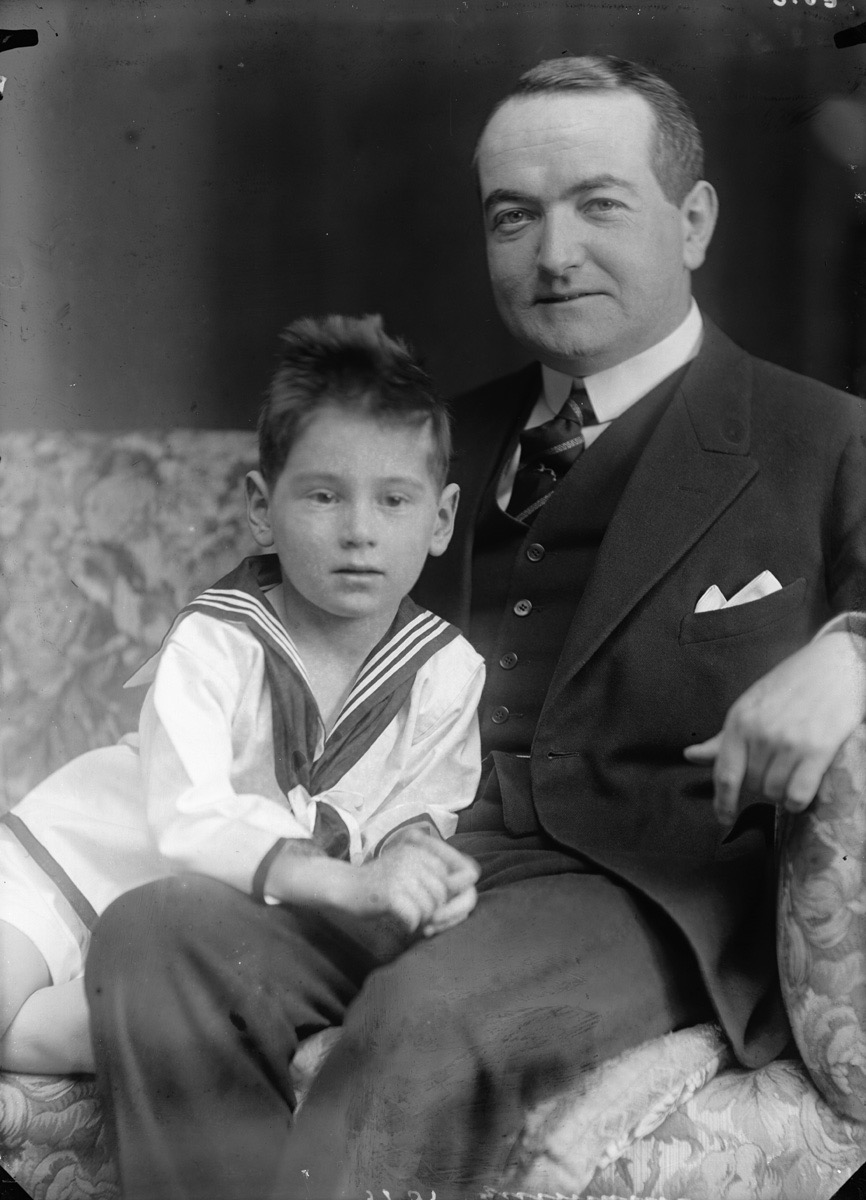
Friedrich Gutmann with his son Bernhard (1923)

Friedrich Bernhard Eugen "Fritz" Gutmann (15 November 1886 – 30 April 1944) was a Dutch banker and art collector. A convert from Judaism, he and his wife were murdered by the Nazis in 1944, and parts of his art collection stolen by the German occupying forces during the German occupation of the Netherlands. The collection and the fate of Fritz Gutmann is described by his grandson, Simon Goodman, in the 2015 book The Orpheus Clock.

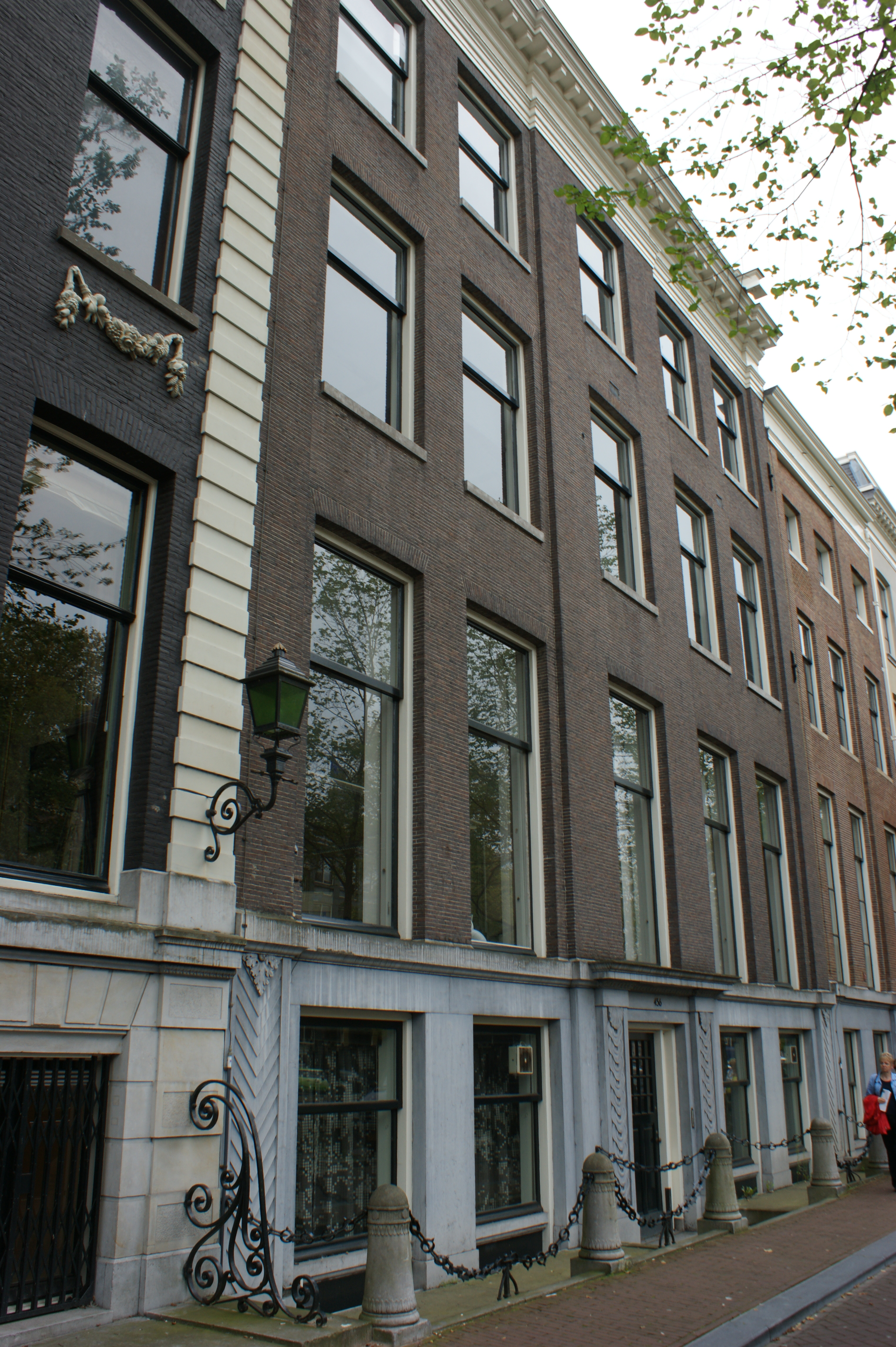

== Biography ==
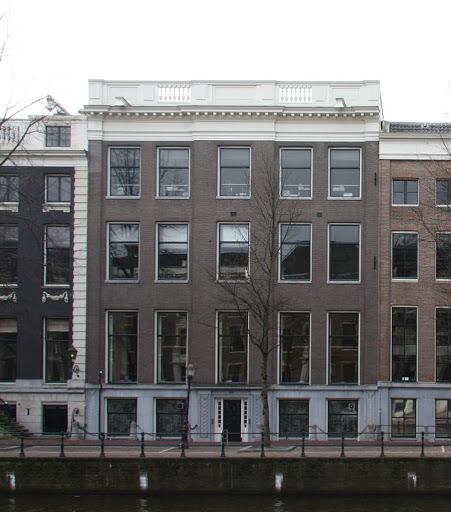
Office Bank Proehl & Gutmann until 1933, Amsterdam, Herengracht 456

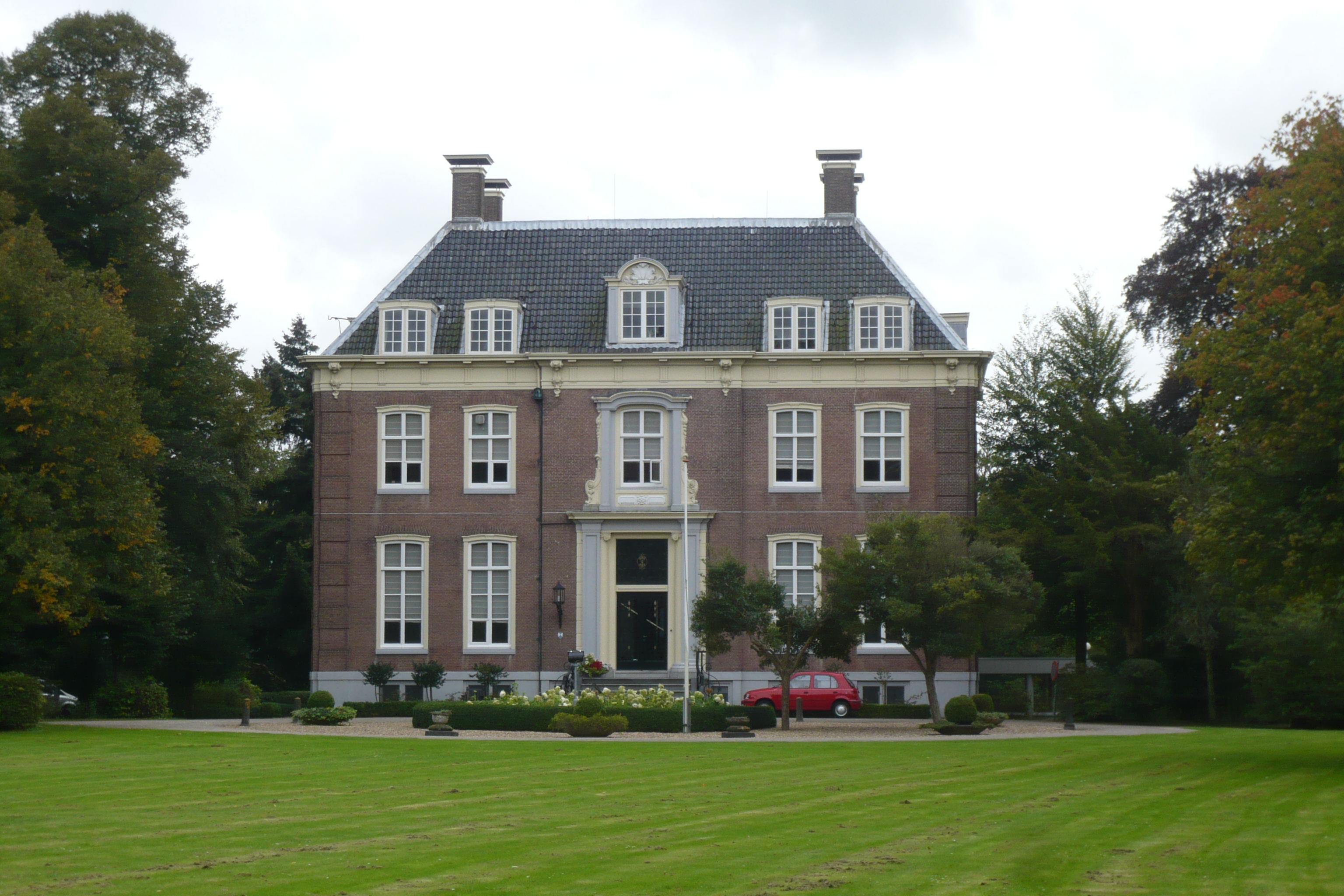
Huis Bosbeek, Heemstede

Gutmann was born in Berlin to Sophie Magnus (1852–1915) and Eugen Gutmann (1840-1925). His father had founded in 1872 the Dresdner Bank. A convert from Judaism, Eugen Gutmann ran the bank in Berlin for over 40 years, developing it into a major German financial operation with an international reach. During that time, he accumulated many works of art, including a famous Renaissance gold and silver collection.

Before 1914, Friedrich was managing director of the Dresdner Bank's British branch in London. He was interned during World War I on the Isle of Man, but by 1918 was able to emigrate to Amsterdam. There he ran the Dresdner bank's branch in Amsterdam under the name Proehl & Gutmann. Though the youngest son of Eugen Gutmann, he became the family trustee of the "Eugen Gutmann Collection". He also amassed an art collection of his own with paintings by Old Masters as well as Impressionist artists such as Renoir and Degas. At their home, Huize Bosbeek, in Heemstede, near Haarlem, Friedrich and his wife, Louise von Landau (whom he had married in 1913), led an "international way of life." Their daughter, Lili, left home for Italy in 1938, where she married, and at about the same time the couple's other child, Bernard (d. 1994), was in England attending university at Cambridge (he Anglicized the surname to "Goodman").

Prior to the outbreak of war in 1939 and the capture of Paris by the Nazis in June 1940, Friedrich sent part of his collection to Paris and New York for safe keeping, and retained what was left at Heemstede. He did not consider himself a Jew – both he and his wife had been baptized - but the Nazis did. In the spring of 1941, Karl Haberstock, the Nazi art dealer active in Paris, visited Heemstede to "buy" the Gutmann collection (the offer was described as a "forced sale"). Friedrich was obliged to sell many artworks and unsuccessfully sought to avoid further Nazi pressure, even having an appeal for protection in 1942 made to Heinrich Himmler, the Nazi SS chief. On May 26, 1943, SS officials came to Heemstede and led away Friedrich and Louise, telling the couple that they were being taken to Berlin. In fact, they were sent to the Theresienstadt concentration camp. In April 1944, a witness saw Friedrich beaten to death in nearby Small Fortress; in October 1944, Louise was sent to Auschwitz, where she was murdered.

== Dispute over looted Degas painting ==
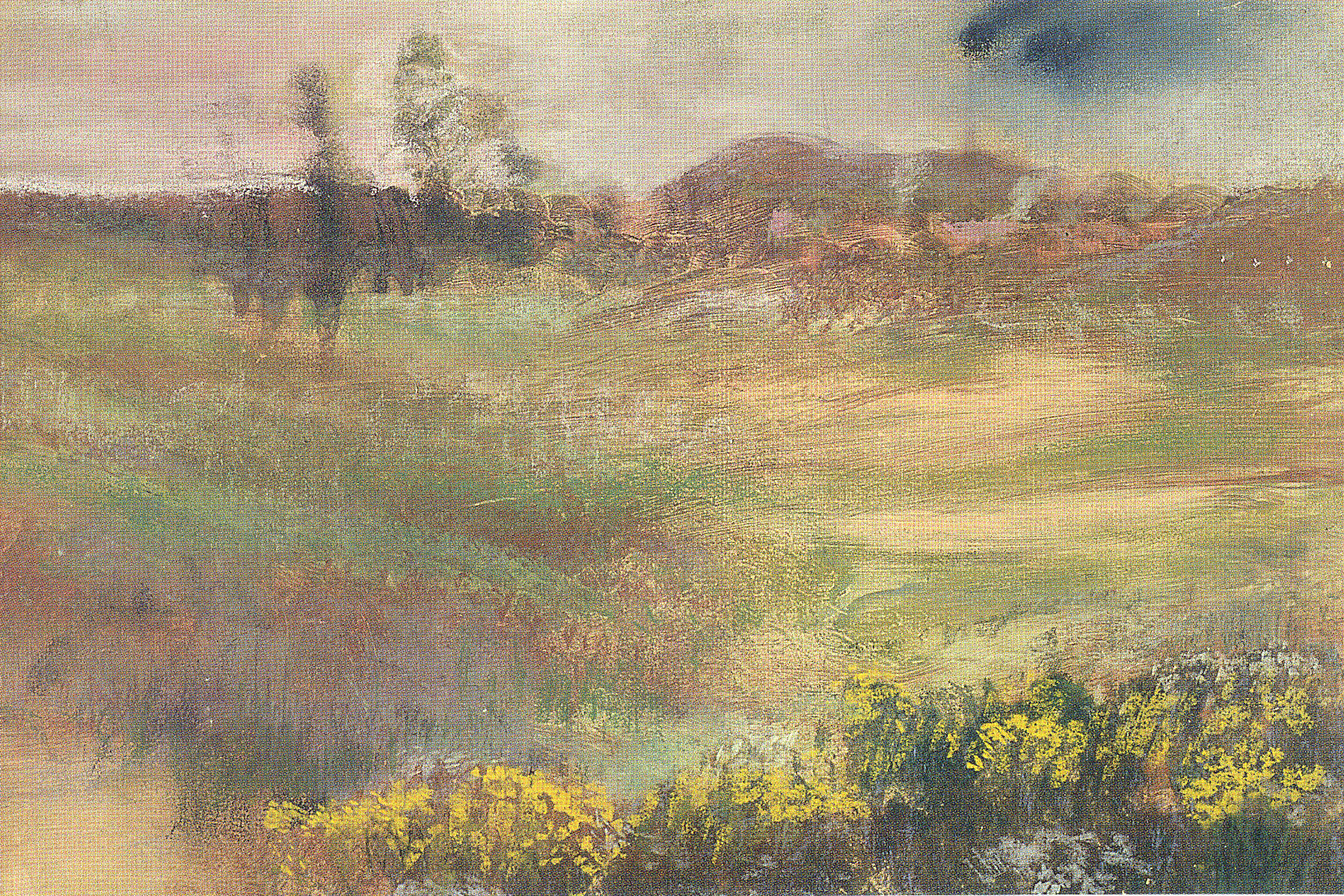
Edgar Degas, Paysage Avec Fumée de Cheminées (Landscape With Smokestacks), 1890, pastel over monotype, Art Institute of Chicago.

After the war, Bernard Goodman and Lili Gutmann returned to find their Heemstede family home stripped of all art. They notified Dutch, French, German and British authorities, and set out to retrieve the items. They had modest successes between 1954 and 1960, but hundreds of items remained missing. Bernard's sons, Nick and Simon, only learned of their father's quest after his death, and continued his pursuit.

=== The Degas painting ===
In October 1995 Simon Goodman found a photograph of one of the looted items in a 1994 exhibition catalogue from the Metropolitan Museum of Art in New York. "Landscape with Smokestacks" ("Paysage Avec Fumée de Cheminées," 1890), a pastel over monotype by Edgar Degas, was cited in the catalogue as belonging to Daniel C. Searle, a pharmaceutical billionaire living near Chicago.

Previously in the collection of Max Silberberg, who put it up for auction, Friedrich Gutmann had bought that work in 1931, and in 1939 sent it to the art firm of Paul Graupe et Cie in Paris for safekeeping. The painting reached New York from Switzerland in 1951 and was sold to American collector Emile Wolf. In 1987, it was purchased from Wolf by Searle for $850,000, after he obtained the advice of experts at the Art Institute of Chicago (where he was a life trustee), on which he "relied heavily." The work's provenance included the name of Hans Wendland, a German art dealer who "stands out like a sore thumb," Willi Korte, a legal expert in retrieving Nazi stolen art, told CBS News reporter Morley Safer in 1997. Wendland, Korte said, was responsible "more than anybody else… for smuggling plundered works of art, plundered by the Nazis in France, into Switzerland for sale." Korte agreed with Safer's summary, that "what you're saying is that that unwillingness to know, that turning a blind eye [to Nazi art plunder during World War II] still applies to these paintings?" Searle's lawyers maintained that Wendland's name was not well known in 1987; Douglas Druick, Searle Curator of European Painting and Prince Trust Curator of Prints and Drawings at the Art Institute, stated he had never heard of him.

After learning of the painting's current ownership (it was held in storage at the Art Institute), the Goodman brothers asked Searle for its return. In an interview they said they wanted "to see justice done," and to recover what they said belonged to them. Searle's position, initially summarized by his Chicago legal counsel Ralph Lerner in 1997, was that "There is sympathy… for any victim of the Nazi regime. Other than that, this case is no different from any other case involving stolen works of art." In 1998, Howard J. Trienens, a partner at the law firm defending Searle, said in an interview that the Goodmans "had no way of proving that they owned it, therefore why should Mr. Searle give it back?" He also wondered "If it is good policy to disrupt the art market by this kind of claim." At the same time, Searle himself expressed "some sympathy" for the Goodman family's feelings, adding, "I have a principle. And the principle is that I will not be extorted."

=== Legal action ===
A year of correspondence between the Goodmans and Searle's lawyers proved unproductive, and in 1996 the Goodmans filed suit against Searle, first in New York and later in Chicago. The suit was believed to be the first instance in the United States of an individual suing for art stolen during the war, and a "turning point" in helping to bring the subject of Nazi plunder "under the international spotlight."

On October 31, 1997, a conference call between the principals failed to achieve a settlement, and the judge postponed the trial to 1998. The request by Searle's lawyers to dismiss the case was rejected by a federal court district judge on July 30, 1998, and a date for a jury trial set for September 9. A segment on the CBS news program 60 Minutes aired across the United States on January 19, 1997; on August 10, 1998, a second program, "Making a Killing," was shown in Chicago on PBS' WTTW-TV. Termed "a powerful British-made documentary on the dispute" by a Chicago newspaper, it "leaves little doubt that a jury… would likely have little sympathy with Searle's ongoing refusal to confront the evidence that the Degas he had purchased in good faith had been stolen by the Nazis."

Growing criticism of the Searle position in Chicago, the decision of the National Gallery of London to review the provenance of its entire collection to determine if any works had been looted by the Nazis (the first art gallery to do so), and the return by German authorities of a looted Van Gogh, preceded an ultimate out of court settlement of the case.

=== Settlement ===
On August 7, 1998, Nick Goodman "decided to call" Searle, and a few hours later Searle told Goodman, "We've got a deal, Nick." Ownership of the painting was split between Searle and the Gutmann heirs (Goodman brothers and Lili Gutmann). Searle donated his portion to the Art Institute, and the institution (America's third largest art museum in terms of revenue) bought the family share (resulting in $243,750 to the Goodmans, with Searle getting an equal amount as an income tax deduction). The resolution had been envisaged by Nick Goodman earlier that year in an interview in "Making a Killing".

Degas' "Landscape with Smokestacks" went on public display at the Art Institute on June 11, 1999. In accordance with the agreement, it was labeled with the words: "Purchased from the collection of Friedrich and Louise Gutmann and a gift of Daniel C. Searle." The compromise acquisition was described as "precedent-setting" by the Art Institute, a view contested as "hardly" the case. A book-length attempt to justify the Searle case by a Searle attorney who had served as a director at G.D. Searle & Company was called "sketchy, overly-generalized and unconvincing; in a particular instance, it is misleading," with "little revealed here which was not known from contemporary sources."

== Restitution efforts in the Netherlands ==
In 2002 the Dutch Government restituted a large number of art works from the Dutch National Art Collections Foundation (Stichting Nederlands Kunstbezit) to the heirs of Friedrich Gutmann. In 2003, the Goodman family sold more than 90 of these art works at auction at Christie's.

In 2010 Simon Goodman also discovered the family's missing 16th Century portrait by Hans Baldung, the following year the Jane Voorhees Zimmerli Art Museum at Rutgers University returned the German renaissance portrait to the Gutmann family. The painting was sold at auction.

In 2010 the Dutch government restituted five more works to the Gutmann heirs. In 2011 the Dutch government restituted a five-piece garniture, consisting of three jars and two vases as well as wooden Pietà sculpture.

== Restitution efforts in Germany ==
In July 2012 the Landesmuseum Württemberg restituted two Renaissance Clocks from the Gutmann Collection by buying them back from his heirs.

In 2020, the Metropolitan Museum of Art and the New York State Department of Financial Services' Holocaust Claims Processing Office announced that it would return a 16th century silver cup to the family heirs.

== See also ==
- Kurt Walter Bachstitz
- Jacques Goudstikker
- Franz Koenigs
- Fritz Mannheimer
- Wilhelm Mautner
