= Achille Boitel =

French industrialist and Nazi collaborator

- Born: 1898
- Died: 1944 (aged 45–46)
- Cause of death: Assassination
- Occupation: Industrialist
- Known for: Nazi collaborator

Achille (or Achilles) Frederic Boitel (1898–1944) was a French industrialist and Nazi collaborator in Paris during the Second World War. He manufactured aircraft engines, traded with the Germans, and played a pivotal role in a collaborationist art syndicate. He was killed by the French resistance.

== Aircraft industry ==
Boitel owned a factory producing aircraft engines. In 1937 he produced his Boitel Soleil, a five-cylinder air-cooled engine producing 70 hp at 2050 rpm. Boitel owned or registered a number of patents in the United States and Great Britain relating to mechanical devices such as engine valves, a gramophone motor, a nut locking device, and others.

== Collaboration ==
Boitel had spent time in Germany before the war, was sympathetic to the Nazi cause, and was a fluent speaker of German. As such, he was of great assistance to the Germans as an interpreter during the early stages of the occupation of Paris in 1940. He operated from 6 rue de Teheran and 11 bis rue Ampere.

He owned a factory producing packing cases for the Dienststelle Westen (Western Agency), the branch of the Nazi looting organisation Einsatzstab Reichsleiter Rosenberg (ERR) for France, Belgium and the Netherlands. He was a friend of Kurt von Behr, the head of the Dienststelle Westen.

== Art dealing ==
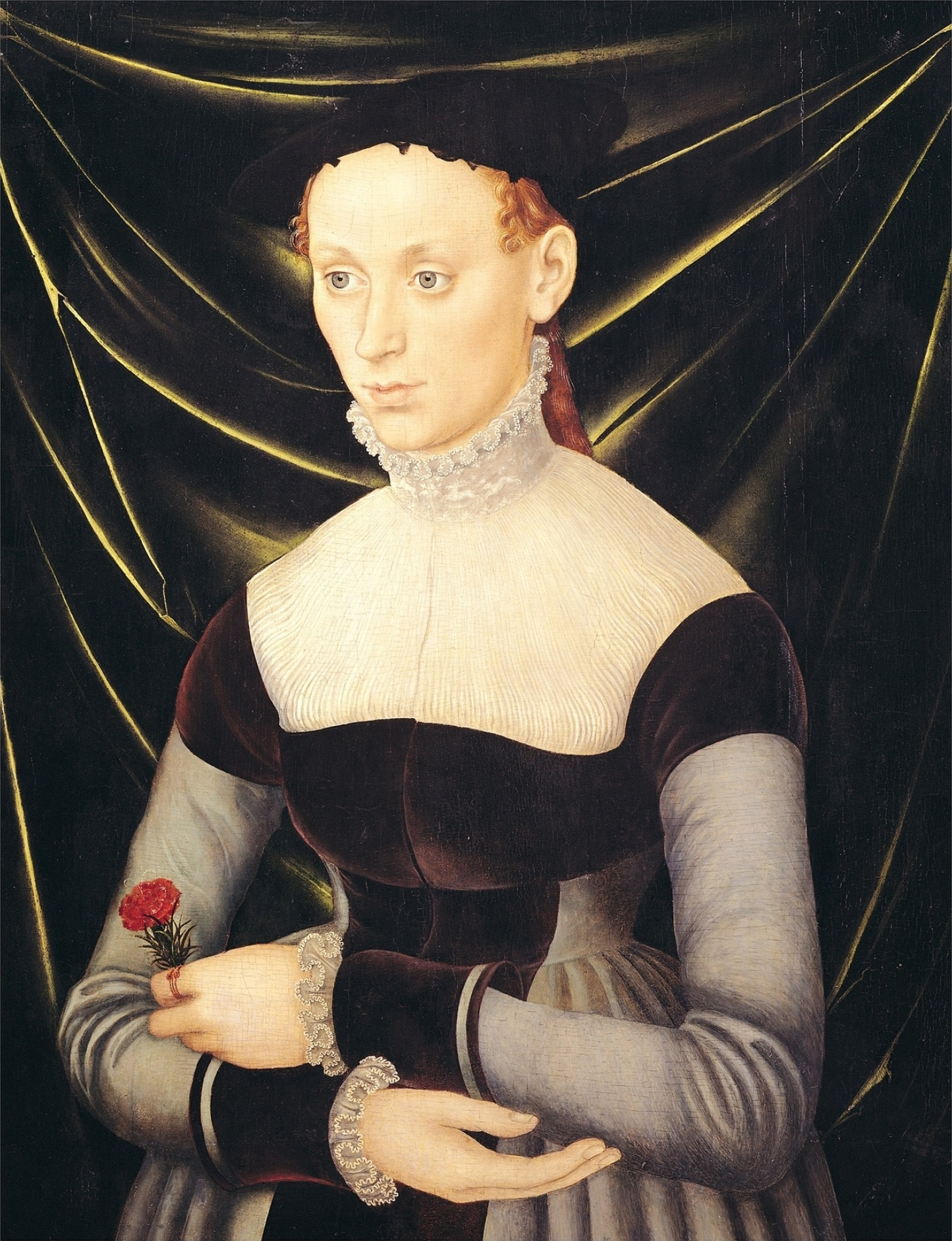
Lucas Cranach the Elder, Woman with a Carnation. Oil on panel. 16th century. Musee d'Art et d'Archeologie, Moulins, France. Sold by Boitel to Hermann Göring.

The French art market was highly active during the Second World War, particularly in its later stages. A number of collaborationist art syndicates were formed that allowed dealers, including Jewish dealers, to trade with the Germans, looted works to be removed from France, pricing and currency anomalies to be exploited, and the origins and destinations of paintings to be disguised.

The Roberts Commission (1943–46) described Boitel as an art dealer and speculator but as having no professional knowledge of the subject. He was part of the syndicate formed by German art dealer Hans Wendland that also included Allen Loebl and Yves Perdoux. He financed many of Wendland's deals and acted as an unofficial banker to the syndicate and to Wendland, holding, according to Wendland, 9 million French Francs on his behalf and buying and selling gold for him. When Wendland was prevented from leaving Switzerland by that country's authorities, Boitel acted as Wendland's agent and Boitel's offices were used as cover for transactions. Wendland told Douglas Cooper in 1945 that he was almost certain that Boitel had worked for the Gestapo.

Boitel's secretary, Roland Mayeux (alias Jules Alfred Mahieu), was an agent for Walter Hofer, director of the Göring Collection. Boitel sold a number of paintings to Göring. Among those for which there are records are, Portrait of a Young Woman (also known as Woman with a Carnation) by Master of the Mass of Saint Gregory and Lucas Cranach the Elder, Pan and Syrinx, or the Bath of Diana by Nicolas Bertin, Shepherdess, French, 18th century, and Portrait of François I, copy after Titian.

== Death ==
Boitel was assassinated by the French resistance, who attached a bomb to his car in July 1944.
