= Jacques Terrane =

French actor

Jacques Terrane (23 August 1915 – 20 June 1941), born Jacques Tartière in Paris, was a French-American actor and soldier who died fighting with the Free French Forces in Syria.

== Biography ==
Terrane was the grandson of the French writer Georges Feydeau, and spent his childhood between the United Kingdom and France, before moving to the United States and obtaining American citizenship following his father's marriage with an American.

At the age of 18 he returned to France to carry out his national service where he was promoted to the rank of sergeant, in 1935 he was discharged for medical reasons. He set up home in the town of Barbizon (Seine-et-Marne, France) 60 km from Paris where he became a chicken farmer.

In 1937, during a trip to New York he met the actress Drue Leyton whom he married in 1938 in London.

In 1939, Terrane and Leyton returned to live in Barbizon and with the help of the French director and producer Roland Tual he became an actor and starred in Jacques Feyder's film La Loi du Nord alongside Michèle Morgan.

== World War II ==
The couple were vacationing in the town of Cassis in the south of France when the Second World War broke out. They returned to Paris where Terrane tried in vain to join the French armed forces. Owing to bronchial problems he was declared unfit for service three times for the French army. However his English language skills allowed him to serve as a liaison officer with the British army's Coldstream Guards.

Terrane wished to take an active part in the war and managed to convince the French army that he was a Norwegian translator despite not speaking a word of the language and was sent to join the French Foreign Legion as part of expeditionary corps commanded by General Béthouart. He was promoted to sergeant major and distinguished himself by organising the unloading of ammunition from a small boat under enemy fire. He was mentioned in dispatches for this act of bravery.

After this operation he was stationed in England when the armistice between France and Germany was announced on 22 June 1940. Terrane immediately signed up to the Free French Forces and was sent to the 13th Demi-Brigade of the Foreign Legion with a promotion to adjudant.

He boarded the Westernland along with Charles de Gaulle to participate in Battle of Dakar where it is reported he fought in a boxing match on deck against the European champion Francis Jacques. He participated in the East African campaign fighting with the 1st Free French Division as a motorcycle reconnaissance notably during the battles to take the towns of Keren and Massawa in Eritrea in April 1941.

At the end of April the division sailed on the cruise-liner Paul Doumer, to join a camp in Qastina, Palestine in preparation for the Syria–Lebanon campaign. On the June 8 he became one of the first to cross the Syrian border, on June 18 he obtained the surrender of a Vichy military unit which was carrying a white flag of truce and whilst returning to his motorcycle was shot in the back. He was taken to hospital in Damascus where he died two days later, and was buried in Ramleh, Syria.

The telegram signed by de Gaulle on 2 August 1941 informing of his death reads "Adjutant Legion Jacques Tartière blessé neuf [sic] juin au cours mission périlleuse reconnaissance exécutée avec bravoure décédé hôpital Sarafand Palestine suite blessure STOP a gagné admiration de tous par courage et résignation sort fatal" (French for 'Adjutant Legion Jacques Tartière wounded 9 [sic] June during perilous reconnaissance mission carried out with bravery died hospital Sarafand Palestine following wound STOP won admiration of all by courage and acceptance fatal destiny').

== Family ==
His half-brother, Philippe Keun, also joined the French Foreign Legion at the outset of the war and then went on to become an agent for the Secret Intelligence Service. He was betrayed and captured by the Gestapo and hung at the concentration camp of Buchenwald.

His wife Drue Leyton was also a member of the French Resistance and assisted allied airmen shot down in France to escape. She was captured and sent to a concentration camp but managed to escape by feigning cancer.

His uncle Thierry de Martel who was the chief surgeon at the American Hospital in Neuilly on the outskirts of Paris committed suicide on June 14, 1940 as he could not stand the idea of living under Nazi occupation.

== Filmography ==
- 1942 : La Loi du Nord by Jacques Feyder

== Awards ==
- Legion of Honour
- Compagnon de la Libération
- Croix de guerre 1939-1945 with 2 palms
