= Drue Leyton =

American actress (1903–1997)

Drue Leyton (born Dorothy Elizabeth Blackman; 12 June 1903 – 8 February 1997) was an American actress and member of the French Resistance. She also was billed as Freya Leigh.

== Early years ==
Leyton was born in California (or Somers, Wisconsin) but lived with her family in Mexico, where her father was a mining engineer. She was educated at the Bennett School for Girls in Millbrook, New York; a school in Lausanne, Switzerland; and at the Sorbonne.

== Acting ==
She became an actress after a failed marriage and acted in Green Grow the Lilacs on Broadway and several Charlie Chan films. Her Broadway credits also included Red Harvest (1937), A Hero Is Born (1937), and We Are No Longer Children (1932), for which she was billed as Freya Leigh.

In 1937, Leyton acted in a Works Progress Administration Theatre Project in New York. She went from there to England, where she performed in Golden Boy.

== French resistance ==
In 1937, Leyton moved to Paris with her future husband Jacques Terrane (born Jacques Tartière), a Franco-American actor who died in Syria in 1941 fighting with the Free French forces.

In France, Leyton produced and interviewed people on programs for Radio Mondial, a shortwave radio station operated by France's Ministry of Information. The programs were designed to promote France to an American audience.

Leyton broadcast for the Voice of America while acting in Paris in 1938 and her criticisms of the Nazi regime during these broadcasts earned her a promise of execution announced by Berlin radio. In September 1942, she was arrested by the Nazis after northern and western France came under German occupation — but only because she was an American woman, her true identity unknown to the authorities. She managed to escape from her prison camp with the help of French doctors by feigning cancer. She returned to her home in Barbizon in 1942 and joined the resistance movement, helping 42 downed Allied airmen escape to freedom and hiding others in her home until the war ended. During this period, she was known as Dorothy Tartière, using her married name. She was assisted at times in hiding the airmen by Sylvia Beach, American-born owner of the Paris bookstore Shakespeare and Company.

Leyton and M. H. Werner wrote about this period in a book The House Near Paris.

== Personal life ==
Leyton met Tartière in New York in 1937, and they wed in 1938 in London.

== Death ==
On 2 February 1997, Leyton died in Corona del Mar, California.

== Filmography ==
Year	Title	Role	Notes
1934	Change of Heart	Mrs. Gerald Mockby	
1934	Charlie Chan's Courage	Paula Graham	
1934	Charlie Chan in London	Pamela Gray	
1935	Valley of Wanted Men	Sally Sanderson	
1936	Charlie Chan at the Circus	Nellie Farrell	
1936	Small Town Girl	Felicia	Uncredited
1936	Blackmailer	Lydia Rankin	
1936	Alibi for Murder	Norma Foster	
1939	Murder in Soho	Myrtle	

== See also ==
- Tudor and Dolores Wilkinson, an American couple known to Leyton and also active in the Resistance.
