= Raoul Heilbronner =

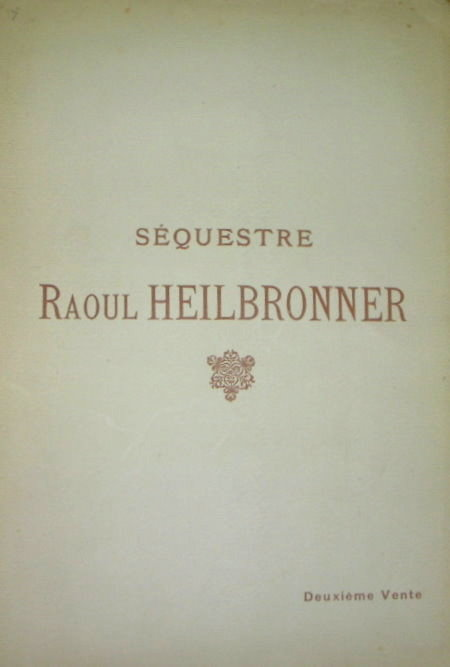
The auction catalogue for the sale in November 1921 of material sequestered from Raoul Heilbronner.

Raoul Heilbronner (died 1941) was a German-born art and antiques dealer operating in Paris from before 1887 who supplied many of the important collectors of his era, including Sir Joseph Duveen, Henry E. Huntington and William Randolph Hearst. His premises were at 3 rue du Vieux-Colombier.

== First World War ==
As a German, Heilbronner's business was adversely affected by hostilities between France and Germany during the First World War. He returned to Germany at the outbreak of the war and his home in Paris was confiscated and sold at auction by the French government not long afterwards. Sales of Heilbronner's collection and stock were held by auction between 1921 and 1925.

In 1952, Tudor Wilkinson donated Heilbronner's papers (1887–1914) to the Library of Congress. Wilkinson is thought to have acquired the papers at one of the auctions in the 1920s.
