= Sepp Angerer =

Rug merchant and art dealer

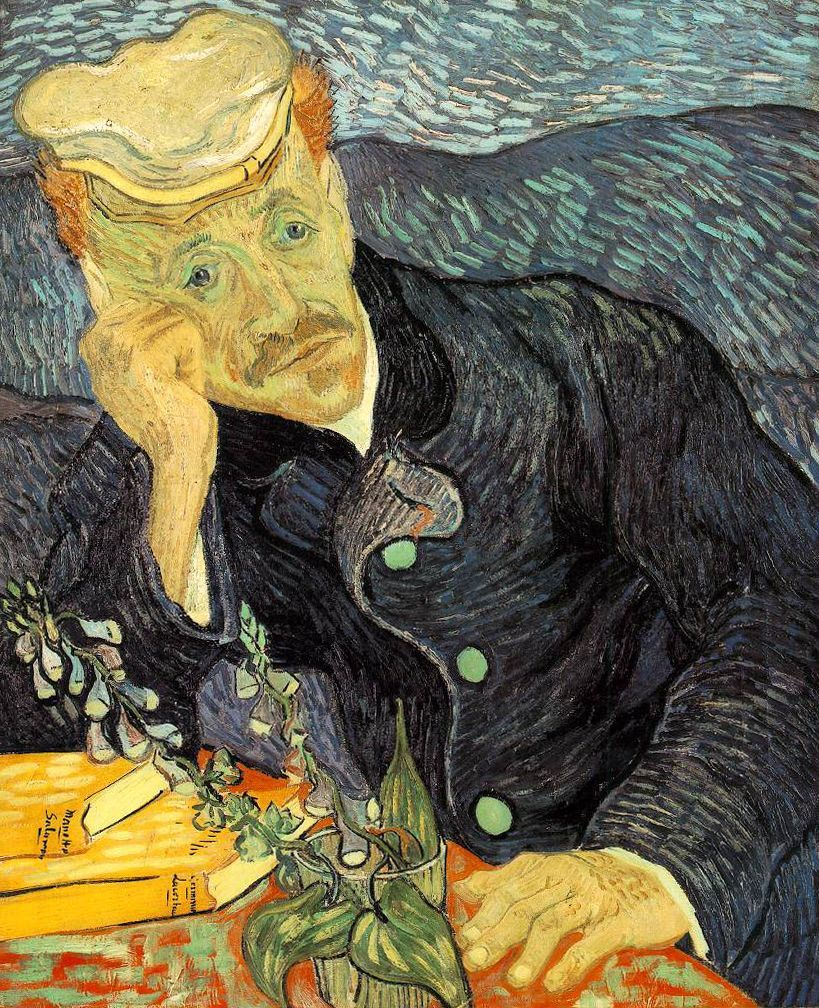
Portrait of Dr. Gachet by Vincent van Gogh, 1890. First version. Private collection. One of the works sold by Angerer for Göring.

Josef "Sepp" Angerer (1899–1961) was a rug merchant and art dealer who acted as an agent for Hermann Göring's private art collection, immediately before and during the Second World War. Art that Angerer dealt with for Göring came from a variety of sources: looted, acquired using threats, bought on the open market, and appropriated from museums.

== Background ==
Angerer was director of Quantmeyer & Eicke, of Kronenstrasse 61, Berlin, importers of rugs, furniture and works of art. In art matters he was second only to Walter Hofer in importance to Göring. Angerer used his international contacts to find art for the Göring collection and arranged the sale of the modern works that Göring did not want, thus raising funds to buy the tapestries and old master works that Göring preferred. Although he had strong Nazi connections, Angerer held no official position within the Nazi state.

== "Degenerate art" ==
The Nazis regarded any art that did not fit with their ideas of what art should be as Degenerate art. Almost all modern art was regarded as "degenerate". It was banned under the regime, seized and placed in special storehouses, and the artists who produced it were subject to sanctions. In 1938, Göring removed 13 paintings from the store of seized "degenerate art" at Kopenickerstrasse. Among others, works of Paul Cézanne and Vincent van Gogh that he sold through Angerer. German-born Dutch national Franz Koenig bought Van Gogh's Portrait of Dr. Gachet (first version, 1890) and Daubigny's Garden (1890), and Cézanne's The Quarry (c. 1900). Koenig died in 1941 when he fell under a train at Cologne station. According to Ivan Lindsay, Koenig was killed by the Nazis, so his collection of old master drawings could be taken from him. Of the remaining paintings, one by Edvard Munch and one by Paul Signac were sold by Angerer in Sweden and two further Munchs in London. Göring paid compensation to the Städel Museum for the Van Gogh and the Folkwang Museum for the Cézanne but at a fraction of the paintings true worth.

== Gifts for Hitler ==
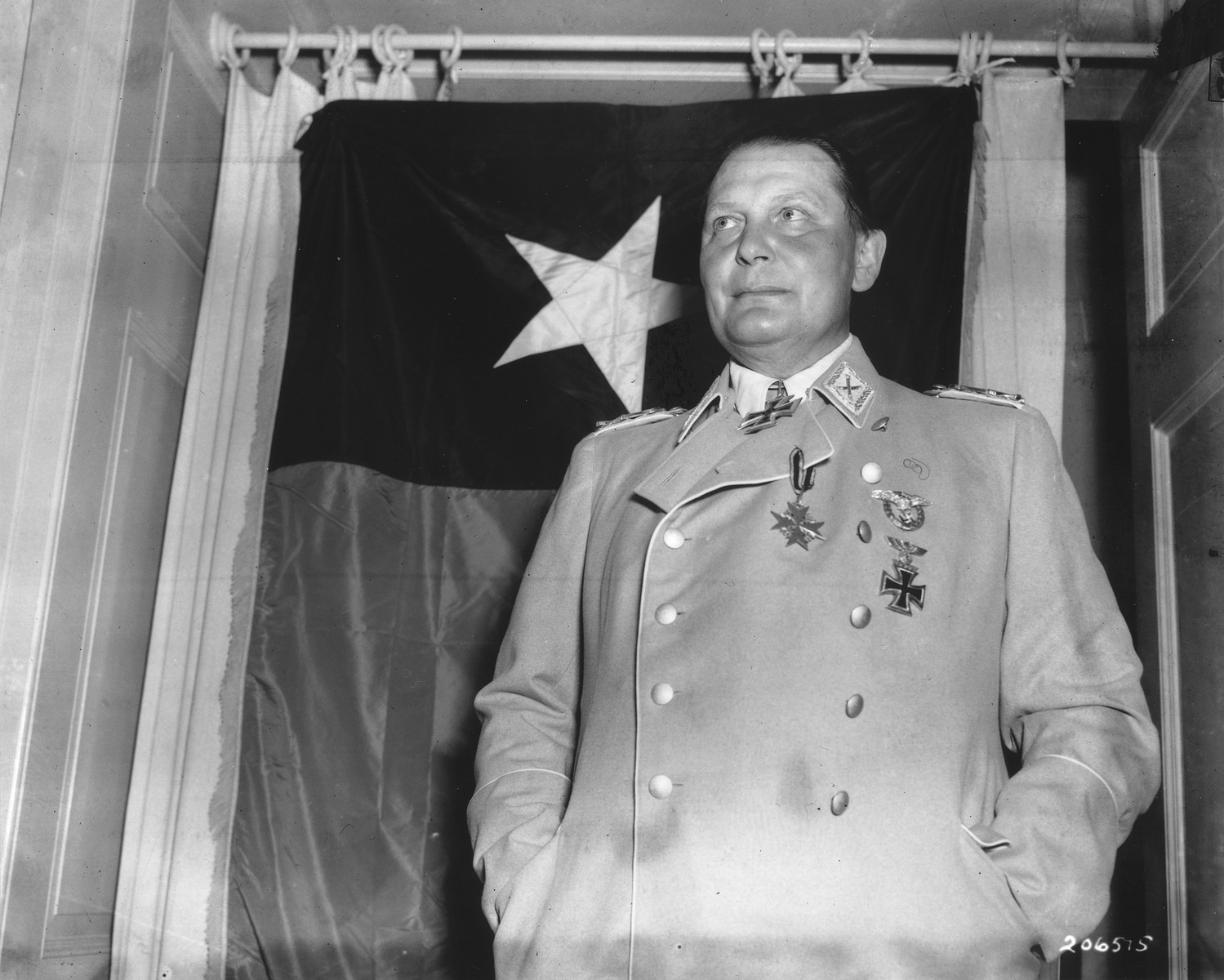
Göring in captivity 9 May 1945

Top Nazis liked to give each other gifts of art. When Göring desired to give Adolf Hitler a gift, he asked Angerer to buy eight Flemish tapestries from Albert Auwercx's series of "Gothic Myths", as the Nazis called these allegorical subjects. Göring's own deals could be mixed into such transactions in order to disguise them.

== Activities in Italy ==
Angerer was asked by Göring to buy six tapestries in Italy for 400,000 Lire. He took a dozen to Göring in Berlin in August 1941 of which Göring bought six. On a trip to Florence, around 1942, Angerer and the local German consul Gerhard Wolf went on a tour of Count Bonacossi's collection. Angerer supposedly told the count, "What a pity you're not a Jew!" and drawing a finger across his throat continued "If you were a Jew, we could do just that! And all the paintings would be ours!" Forewarned of a German art raid, local collections had already removed their best items and hidden them elsewhere behind false walls. Records had been falsified and the remaining works spaced out to disguise the absences. Enquirers after the Jewish art historian Bernard Berenson's collection were told that he had fled to Portugal with the help of the Vatican and that nothing of importance remained in Florence. In fact, he was still in Italy, awaiting the Allied liberation.

== Post war ==
Angerer was interrogated by the Allies in the autumn of 1945. He was placed under arrest and his home at Berchtesgaden, which he had shared with Fritz Görnnert (Göring's personal assistant), was searched. Thomas Carr Howe Jr., one of the U.S. "monuments men" charged with recovering looted art, described what he found there:

"The house was an unpretentious villa hidden among pine trees high up in the hills above the town. The place was under guard. On the ground floor we examined the contents of a small storeroom. There were several cases bearing Angerer's name and three or four large crates containing Italian furniture. A similar storeroom on the second floor contained a dozen tapestries, a pile of Oriental rugs, a large collection of church vestments and nearly a hundred rare textiles mounted on cardboard. … Concealed beneath the tapestries were ten cases, each one about two feet square and a foot high... On each one was stenciled in Gothic letters: "Reichsmarschall Hermann Göring." They contained a magnificent collection of Oriental weapons."

In 1946, Angerer was placed on the American Office of Strategic Services special counterintelligence Art Looting Investigation Unit's "red flag" list of people and organisations that were involved in the art trade under the Nazis. His life after that is unclear.

== See also ==
- Art theft
- Nazi plunder
