= Automobiles Boitel =

Boitel is a former French automaker.

== History ==
The company began business as an automaker at their plant on the eastern side of Paris in 1946. By 1950 the last car had been produced.

== The car ==
Boitel was an engineer who developed a two-seater small car during the early 1940s, but the single-cylinder engined prototype proved too small to transport two people and the project was abandoned. The Boitel resurfaced soon after the Liberation, however, when the manufacturer exhibited a small two seater steel bodied cabriolet car at the 1946 Paris Motor Show. The Boitel was now powered by a two-cylinder two-stroke engine of 400 cc for which a maximum 12 hp of power was claimed. In 1947, Boitel returned to the Pairs Motor Show with another small two seater steel bodied cabriolet car, very similar to the previous year's exhibit but slightly more elegant. Now it was powered by a rear-mounted 589 cc 18 hp engine from DKW. The final car, produced in 1949, followed the same format but was powered by a 688 cc engine providing 20 hp. It seems that all three cars sat on a 2000 mm wheelbase and were 3150 mm long overall.

It is not clear whether the Boitel ever went into production. At the 1947, motor show there was an understanding that the cars would enter production in 1948, and some orders were taken in anticipation of this. Boitel took some deposits with the orders which subsequently could not be refunded because the business failed.
