= Pietro Capelli =

Italian painter

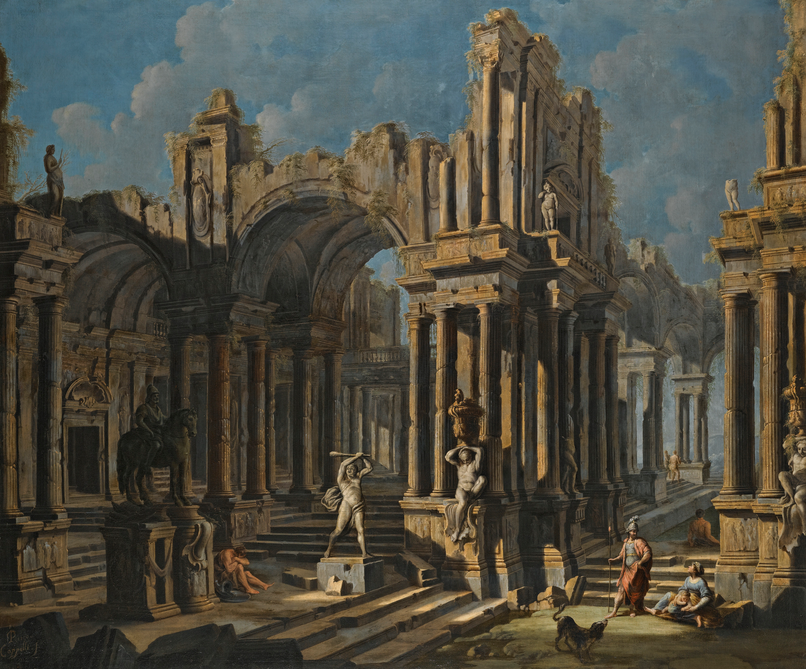
Architectural Capriccio with a Statue of Hercules, oil on canvas, priv. col.

Pietro Capelli or Pietro Cappelli (born circa 1700, died 1724 or 1727) was an Italian painter of the Rococo, active in his native city of Naples.

== Biography ==
Pietro Capelli was born in Naples around 1700. His father, Giuseppe Capelli, was a scenic designer at the Teatro San Bartolomeo in Naples. His brother, Giuseppe Capell, was a painter in Rome of scenographic decoration (theatrical decorations). Capelli trained under Francesco Solimena. He was active in quadratura, but also painted capricci and canvases with landscapes. He was a rival of Leonardo Coccorante. Grossi states that he was so full of imagination, and fast at painting, that he did not even sketch beforehand for his works.
