= Lage, North Rhine-Westphalia =

City in Lippe, North Rhine-Westphalia, Germany

Lage
- Town
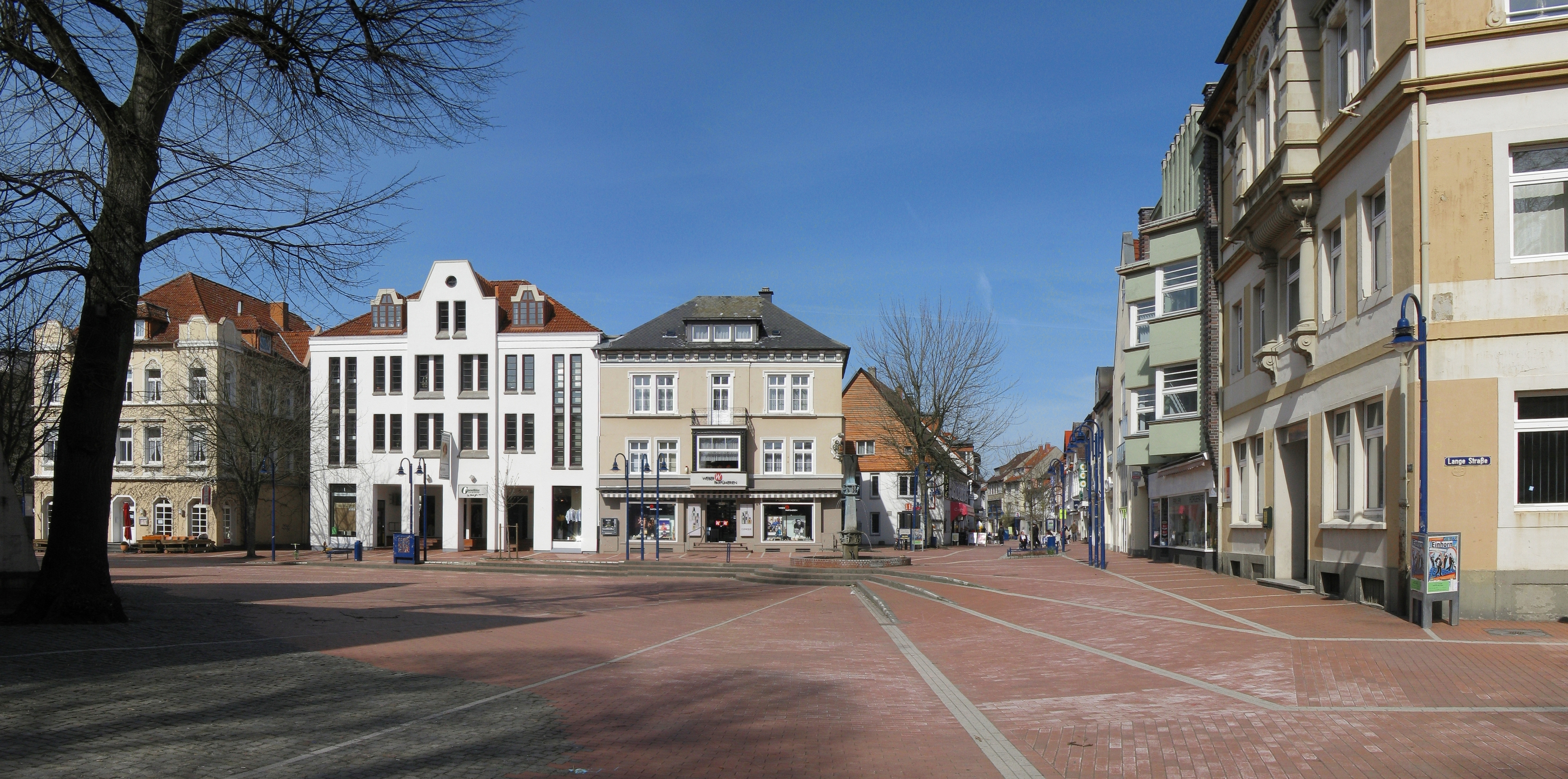
- Market square

- Coat of arms

- Location of Lage within Lippe district
- Interactive map of Lage
- Location within Germany Location within North Rhine-Westphalia
- Coordinates: 51°59′20″N 8°47′40″E
- Country: Germany
- State: North Rhine-Westphalia
- Admin. region: Detmold
- District: Lippe

Government
  - Mayor (2019–24): Matthias Kalkreuter (SPD)

Area
  - Total: 76.04 km^{2} (29.36 sq mi)
- Elevation: 100 m (330 ft)

Population (2025-12-31)
  - Total: 34,818
  - Density: 457.9/km^{2} (1,186/sq mi)
- Time zone: UTC+01:00 (CET)
  - Summer (DST): UTC+02:00 (CEST)
- Postal codes: 32779–32791
- Dialling codes: 05232
- Vehicle registration: LIP
- Website: www.lage.de

Lage (German pronunciation: [ˈlaːɡə]) is a town in the Lippe district of North Rhine-Westphalia, Germany, approximatively 8 km northwest of the administrative centre Detmold. It has 34,818 inhabitants (2025). The coat of arms of Lage depicts a farmer's plough. The city is not far from the Teutoburg Forest. Due to its convenient location Lage developed into a traffic hub in the former Principality of Lippe, today's district of Lippe.

== History ==
Numerous finds indicate a colonization of the location since the Neolithic times (2400 to 1800 b.c.).

Around 900 a.d. the parish church of St. Johann (today's Marktkirche) has been founded on a hillhock at the river Werre and is the origin of today's city Lage. In 1274, Lage is mentioned the first time in a document for the life annuity of the local clergy by the sentence "Jordanus plebanis in Lagis". In 1539, with the election of the first mayor self-administration rights are provable.

In 1843, borough rights were awarded by ruler Leopold II, Prince of Lippe. In the years after 1880 the construction of the railway lines Herford to Detmold (1880) and Bielefeld to Lemgo (1893) linked Lage to the surrounding cities by train and created an interchange station.

During World War I (1914-1918) the hospital served as a military hospital. Sections of the Infantry Regiment 67 were quartered in the town. On 9 January 1933, Adolf Hitler spoke on a central square (Jahnplatz) in Lage. During World War II (1939-1945) several attacks by Allied bombers hit the center of Lage, causing over 60 casualties in the local population and destroying many houses.

In 1970, the city merged to form a large municipality with a population of 32,000 with the surrounding communities Billinghausen, Ehrentrup, Hagen, Hardissen, Hedderhagen, Heiden, Heßloh, Horste, Kachtenhausen / Wellentrup, Müssen, Ohrsen, Pottenhausen, Stapelage, Waddenhausen and Wissentrup after local government reorganization.

Lage is about 195 kilometres (121 mi) from Cologne, the largest city in the North Rhine-Westphalia. It was the host of the 1996 European Cup Combined Events championships and hosts other international sport of athletics competitions.

== Population ==
Historical population

Year	Pop.	±% p.a.
1965	29,577	—
1970	31,063	+0.99%
1975	31,710	+0.41%
1980	32,292	+0.36%
1985	32,082	−0.13%
1990	34,317	+1.36%
1995	35,931	+0.92%

Year	Pop.	±% p.a.
2000	36,073	+0.08%
2005	35,989	−0.05%
2010	35,169	−0.46%
2015	35,120	−0.03%
2020	34,885	−0.13%
2025	34,818	−0.04%

Source: Landesdatabank Nordrhein-Westfalen

== Twin towns – sister cities ==
Lage is twinned with:

- Horsham, England, United Kingdom
- Sankt Johann im Pongau, Austria

== Notable people ==
- Heinemann Vogelstein (1841–1911), rabbi
- Gottlieb Reber (1880–1959), art collector
- Fritz Bracht (1899–1945), Nazi Gauleiter of Upper Silesia
