= Wilhelm Mautner =

- Born: 28 November 1889; Vienna, Austria-Hungary
- Died: 1944 (aged 54–55); Auschwitz, Poland
- Occupation: Economist

Wilhelm Mautner (28 November 1889 – 1944) was born in Vienna. He was an Austrian-German economist and attorney-in-fact of the Rotterdamse Bank who spent a part of his life in the Netherlands. Mautner was born Jewish. He was also an art collector.

== Early years ==
After a short professional career in banking and industry, he studied economics in Paris, Vienna and Tübingen, where he finished his studies and wrote a thesis about Bolshevism in 1919. In the same year, he moved to the Netherlands.

== World War II ==
From 1929 until 1944 he lived in Amsterdam. Mautner never married and had no children. On 22 July 1941, he drew up a will in which he appointed his brother in Ohio in the United States as his sole heir. During the war Mautner attempted unsuccessfully to escape from the Nazi regime. Mautner tried to get an exit visa for the United States with the help of his brother, who lived in New York. In December 1943 Mautner was removed from his home in Amsterdam during a raid and transported to Westerbork transit camp and from there to Theresienstadt concentration camp. Mautner died on or around 29 September 1944 in Auschwitz concentration camp.

== Art collection ==
Mautner collected paintings. His collection also included some Dutch old masters. He continued purchasing works of art during the war. At that time he was in frequent contact with Max Jakob Friedlander. From 1941, he was no longer able to do so in his own name because of his Jewish origins. He gave works of art to various people for safekeeping. In February 1942, Mautner was ordered to move to Tugelaweg in Amsterdam as a result of the forced relocation of Jews. He sent 15 paintings for safe-keeping with the collector Dr J. van Dongen on the city's Museumplein. The latter kept all of these items until after the war. Other works, including a Brueghel and a Timmermann, were sold under duress in 1943 by Mautner. Various of Mautner's works of art and other possessions were recovered for his heirs, by custodians of his estate after the war. The 15 paintings in J.A. van Dongen's custody were probably bought by van Dongen with the consent of Mautner's heirs. Three of the paintings that Mautner sold under duress are:

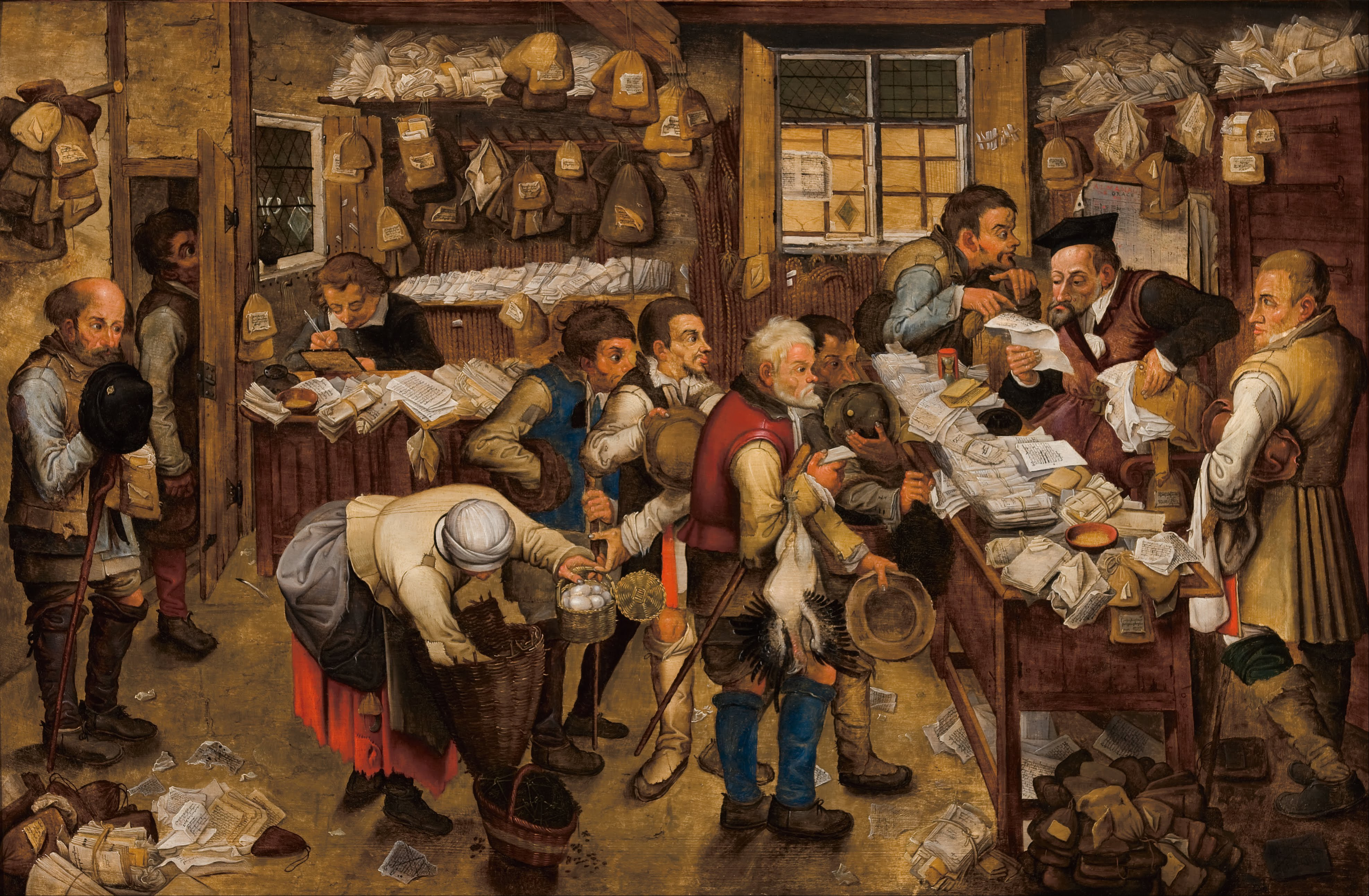
Pieter Brueghel the Younger, A Tax Collector's Office, 17th century - NK 2297

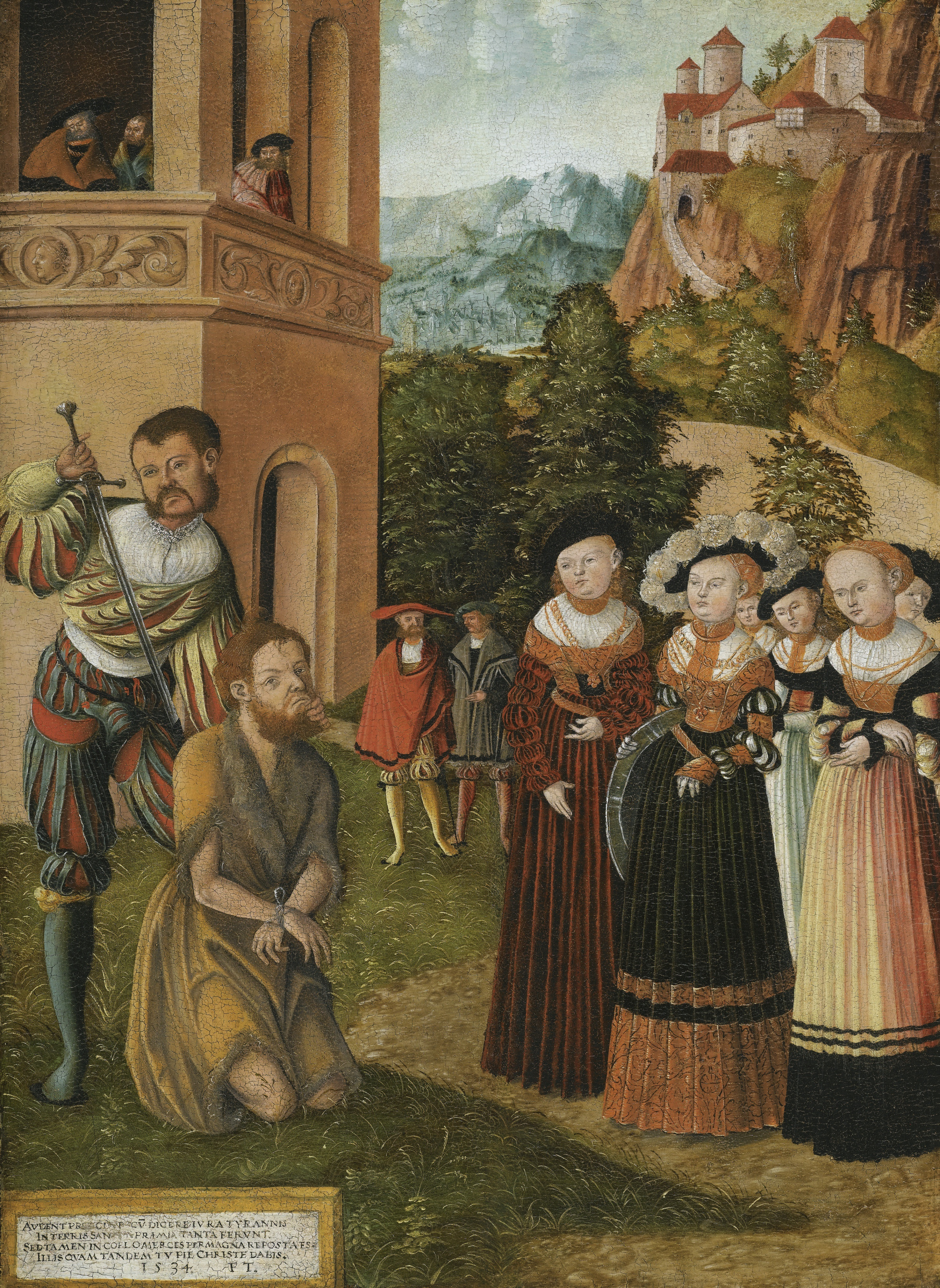
Franz Tymmermann, The Beheading of St. John the Baptist, dated 1534 - NK 1655

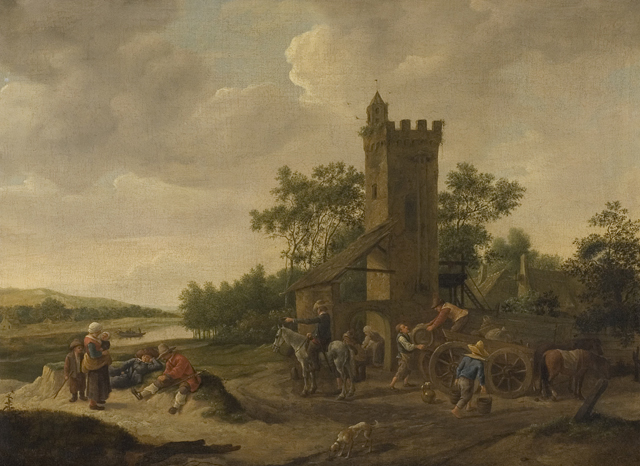
Jan Steen, River landscape with figures and a wagon in front of a tower, third quarter 17th century - NK 2655

The latter two were acquired by the Sonderauftrag Linz and returned to the Netherlands after the war, where they became part of the NK-Collection of the Stichting Nederlands Kunstbezit.

He also sold 12 paintings, primarily 19th century, to W. Kadzik from Vienna. Mautner could not act as a seller, due to his Jewish origin, so he asked his friend Hans Alfred Wetzlar to fulfill the formalities. It is unknown where the works are.

== Published works ==
- Mautner, Wilhelm (1929). Der Kampf um und gegen das russische Erdöl Wien, Leipzig, Manz. Manzsche Verlags- und Universitäs-Buchhandlung.
- Mautner, Wilhelm (1920). Der Bolschewismus Berlin, Kohlhammer.
- Mautner, Wilhelm (1923). Die Verschuldung Europas Frankfurt am Main, Frankfurter societäts-druckerei.
- Mautner, Wilhelm (1937). American capital in the D.E.I. petroleum industry Dallas, Texas, DeGolyer and MacNaughton.
- Mautner, Wilhelm (1934) (possibly, or Wilhelm Martin, former director of the Mauritshuis) Article in Weltkunst February 17, 1934 Ein Neuentdeckter Steen
- Mautner, Wilhelm (1934). Article in Oud Holland about painter Hendrick Andriessen
- Mautner, Wilhelm (1941). Article in Oud Holland general essay about unknown Old Masters
