= Gerhard Wolf =

German diplomat

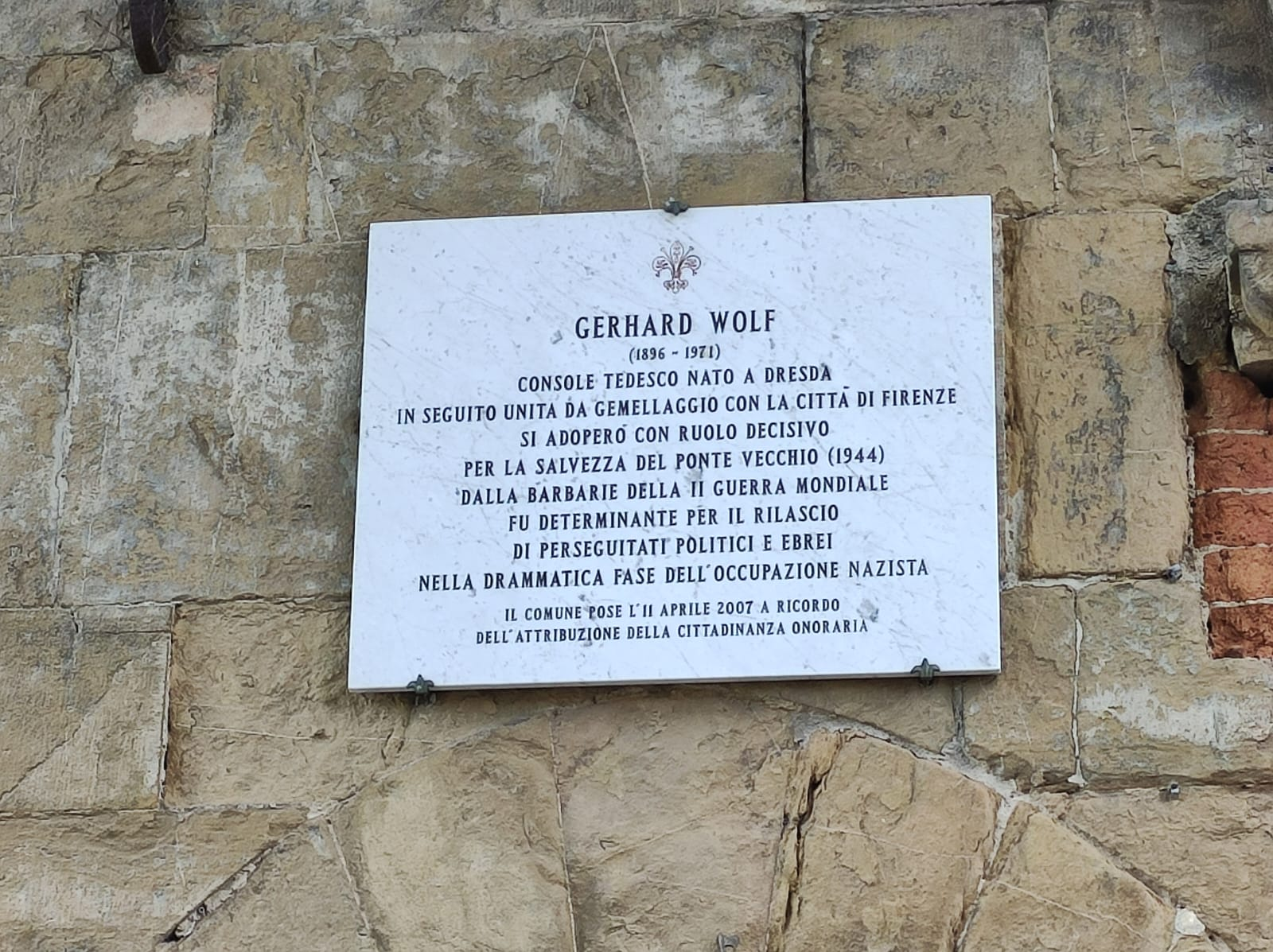
The plaque in Italian reads: "Gerhard Wolf (1886 [sic]–1962). German consul, born at Dresden—subsequently twinned with the city of Florence—played a decisive role in the salvation of the Ponte Vecchio (1944) from the barbarism of the Second World War and was instrumental in rescuing political prisoners and Jews from persecution at the height of the Nazi occupation. The commune places this plaque on 11 April 2007 in memory of the granting of honorary citizenship."

Gerhard Wolf (12 August 1896 – 23 March 1971) was a German diplomat who served as consul in Florence during World War II.

Wolf was born in Dresden, the seventh and youngest child of an attorney of family law. After serving in the military, he studied philosophy, art history and literature, and completed a doctorate in philosophy. In 1927, he joined the foreign ministry and was posted to Rome at the time Adolf Hitler came to power in 1933. He was first invited to join the Nazi Party that year, but he declined and did not join until 1 March 1939, after it became clear that his diplomatic work would be impossible otherwise.

Between 1940 and 1944, Wolf was the German consul in Florence. After the German occupation of Italy in 1943, he worked to save many Jews from the Holocaust, including the famous art historian Bernard Berenson, who testified to that effect in 1946. In his efforts, he was supported by Rudolf Rahn, deputy ambassador at Rome and later plenipotentiary to the Italian Social Republic. Wolf, along with Ludwig Heinrich Heydenreich, director of the Kunsthistorisches Institut in Florenz, also saved many artworks from being spirited off to Germany. He also prevented the Ponte Vecchio from being destroyed.

In 1955, Wolf was made an honorary citizen of Florence. Ten years after his retirement, he died in Munich. In 2007, a marble plaque in his honour was unveiled on the Ponte Vecchio by the acting mayor of Dresden.

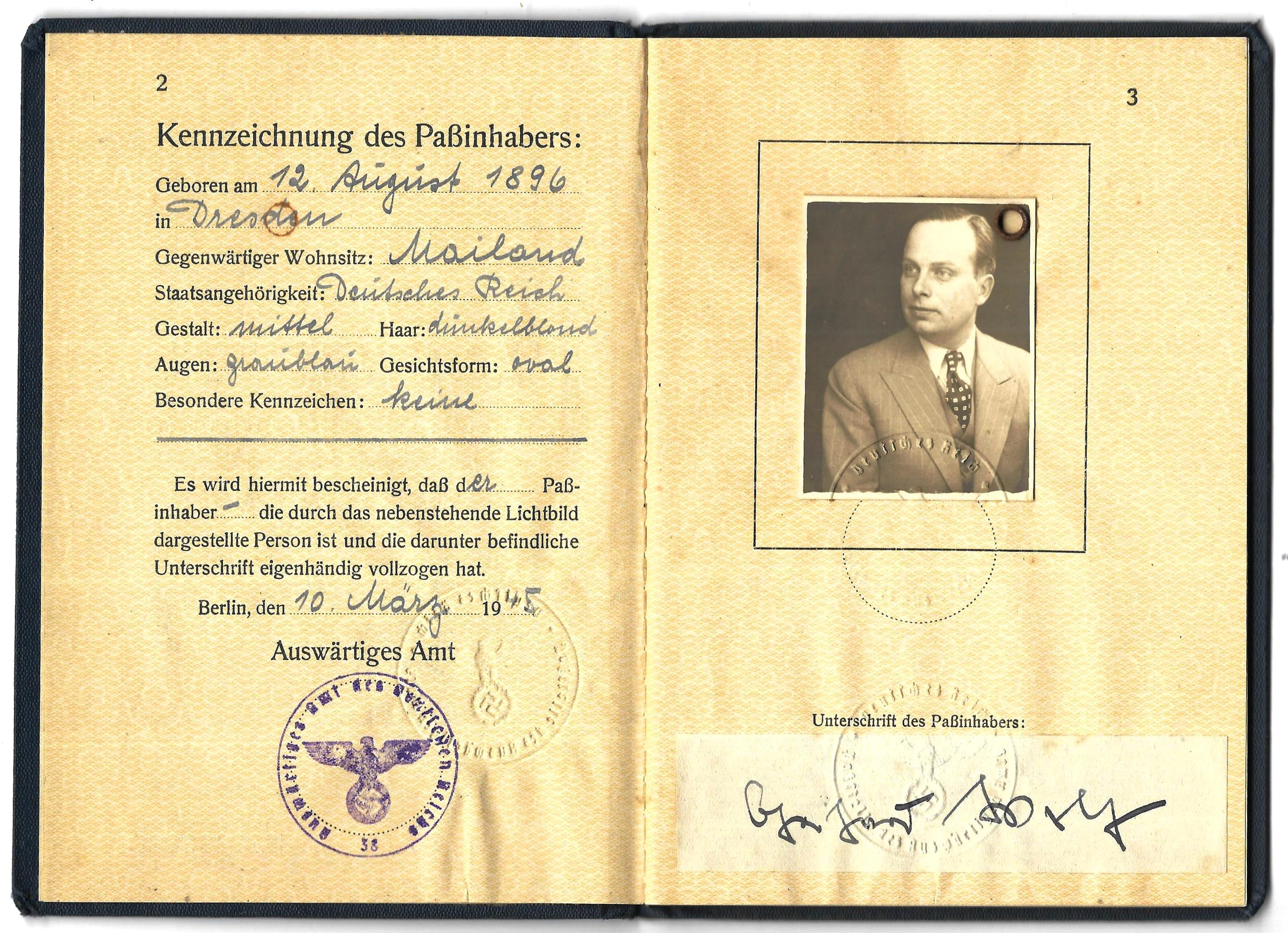
1945 Diplomatic passport issued to consul Gerhard Wolf.
