= Walter Hofer =

German art dealer and art agent of Hermann Göring

Hermann Göring (left) & Walter Hofer (right) at Karinhall

Walter Andreas Hofer (10 February 1893 – 12 October 1975) was a German art dealer who was Hermann Göring's principal art agent, director of the Göring Collection, and an important figure in Nazi art looting during World War II. Hofer is referenced 162 times in the OSS Art Looting Investigation Units Reports of 1945-1946. He was not a member of the Nazi Party. After the war he continued to work as an art dealer in Munich.

== Early life ==
Hofer was born in Berlin in 1893. He began his career at the gallery of his brother-in-law Kurt Walter Bachstitz in The Hague. In 1928, Hofer went to Berlin to study art where he met the Lausanne art collector Gottlieb Reber. Between 1930 and 1934, Hofer worked for Reber in Switzerland. From 1934, Hofer was an independent dealer working in Berlin near the Kurfürstendamm.

== Family ==
In 1937, Hofer married the art restorer Berta Fritsch, who later became the official picture restorer for the Göring Collection. Fritsch was the sister of Gottlieb Reber's secretary.

In 1942, Hofer helped his brother-in-law Kurt Bachstitz, who was Jewish, obtain a visa so that he could flee the Netherlands to Switzerland. He also arranged a divorce for Bachstitz so that his art dealing firm became fully Aryan, thus avoiding confiscation. Hofer's sister Lilly took over the running of the firm.

== Work for Hermann Göring ==
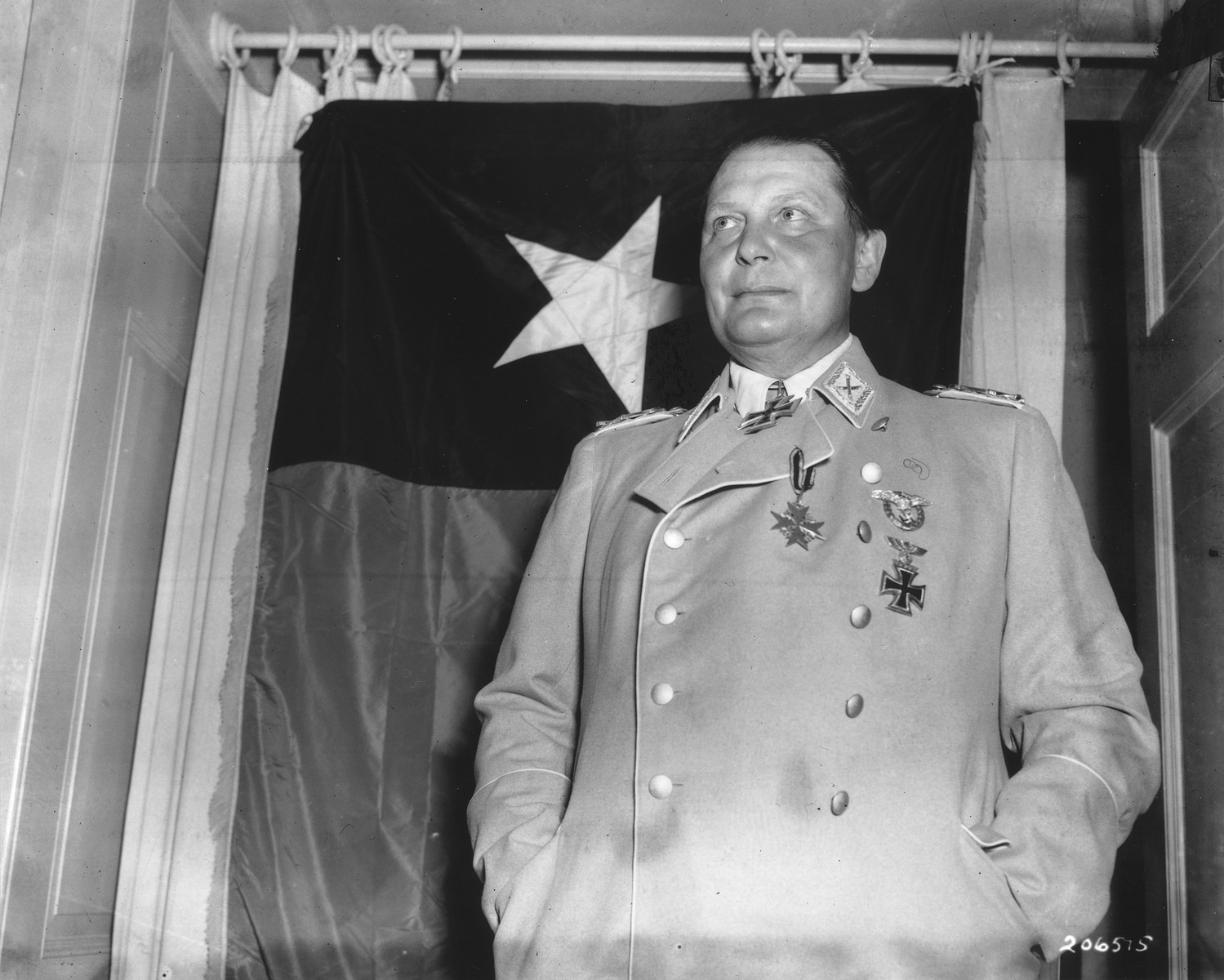
Göring in captivity 9 May 1945

Hofer began to work for Hermann Göring in 1937 and became Göring's principal art agent and later director of the Göring Collection. Hofer was not a member of the Nazi Party. Hofer worked for Göring on a freelance basis, always maintaining his personal art dealing business and it was agreed between them that Hofer could keep any works he found for Göring that Göring refused. With Göring's money and backing, Hofer could access collections anywhere in Germany. He travelled on Göring's special art trains and could get essential foreign currency (Devisen) for his purchases which was in short supply for ordinary Germans. Where he didn't need foreign currency, as in the Netherlands where the German and Dutch currencies became directly convertible in April 1941, he was even more active in his acquisitions, sometimes competing with agents from other parts of the German government. Göring said that the price of a work of art was never a problem and he often paid above market price (where he did not confiscate items outright) though he was often slow to pay the bill. Hofer claimed that on one occasion in Paris, he beat an agent acting for Adolf Hitler to a Rembrandt by one day.

Hofer is mentioned 162 times in the OSS Art Looting Intelligence Unit's 1945-1946 Reports and List of Red Flag Names.

Hofer communicated regularly with Göring about his finds, offering the Reichsmarschall first pick from the treasures on offer. On 26 September 1941, Hofer informed Göring, "I have inspected the paintings of Baroness Alexandrine R. [Rothschild]. They are truly sensational! Her collection consists of twenty five paintings each of the highest quality and greatest importance. Among them is the charming Infanta Margarita by Velasquez, which you must ... [use] any means necessary to acquire for your collection... This collection also includes a large number of modern jewels. Naturally, everything will remain where it is until you decide what you want."

In Italy, Hofer was introduced to Italian collectors by Alessandro Morandotti, who facilitated contact between Göring and other Italian dealers as well.

== Post-war ==
Immediately after V-E Day, Hofer was at Berchtesgaden where he displayed Göring's collection to U.S. soldiers and visiting journalists. Photographs of him with the collection appeared in Life magazine and in newsreels. Berta Hofer continued to work on restorations, apparently as though nothing had happened. Hofer was interrogated by the Allied forces and interned in Hersbruck. He was later convicted in absentia by a French military tribunal and sentenced to ten years in prison which he did not serve. He spent the rest of his life as an art dealer in Munich where he died in about 1971.

== See also ==
- Nazi plunder
- Sepp Angerer
- The Hermann Göring Collection
- Office of Strategic Services Art Looting Investigation Unit APO 413 US Army Detailed Interrogation Report N° 9 15 September 1945 Subject Walter Andreas Hofer
