= Reich Cultural Senate =

The Reich Cultural Senate was a body directly subordinate to the Nazi Reich Chamber of Culture, created by Chamber President and Reich Propaganda Minister Joseph Goebbels on 15 November 1935.

== Members of the Reich Cultural Senate at the time of its founding ==
=== Reich Cultural Managers ===
- Walther Funk (1890–1960), Vice President of the Reich Chamber of Culture, State President
- Hans Schmidt-Leonhardt (1886–1945), managing director of the Reich Chamber of Culture, ministerial councillor
- Franz Moraller (1903–1986), managing director of the Reich Chamber of Culture, SA senior leader
- Hans Hinkel (1901–1960), managing director of the Reich Chamber of Culture, member of the Reichstag

=== Members of the Reich Chamber of Literature ===
- Hanns Johst (1890–1978)
- Heinz Wismann (ministerial official) (1897–1947)
- Richard Suchenwirth (1896–1965)
- Hans Friedrich Blunck (1888–1961)
- Karl Baur (publisher) (1898–1984)
- Wilhelm Baur (publisher) (1905–1945)
- Theodor Fritsch (bookseller) (1895–1946)
- Karl Heinz Hederich (1902–1976)
- Carl Vincent Krogmann (1889–1978), Hamburg
- Gerhard Schumann (1911–1995)
- Martin Wülfing (1899–1986)
- Heinrich Anacker (1901–1971)
- Edwin Erich Dwinger (1898–1981)
- Richard Euringer (1891–1953)
- Eberhard Wolfgang Möller (1906–1972)
- Hermann Stehr (1864–1940)

=== Members of the Reich Chamber of Music ===
- Peter Raabe (1872–1945)
- Paul Graener (1872–1944), who was also appointed Vice President of the Reich Music Chamber
- Heinz Ihlert (1893–1945)
- Franz Adam (conductor) (1885–1954) from the staff of Adolf Hitler's deputy
- Fritz Kaiser
- Friedrich Krebs (1894–1961), Frankfurt am Main
- Hermann Müller-John (1894–1945), music master of the Leibstandarte SS Adolf Hitler
- Horst Sander (1904–1945), head of the German Musical Association
- Hermann Stange (music director) (1884–1953)
- Fritz Stein (1879–1961), director of the State University of Music (Berlin)
- Wilhelm Backhaus (1884–1969)
- Wilhelm Furtwängler (1886–1954)
- Clemens Krauss (1893–1954)
- Hans Pfitzner (1869–1949)
- Heinrich Schlusnus (1888–1952)
- Georg Schumann (1866–1952)

=== Members of the Reich Press Chamber ===
- Max Amann (1891–1957), president, Reichsleiter and director of the Central Party Publishing House
- Otto Dietrich (1897–1952), Vice President, Reich Press Chief of the NSDAP
- Ildephons Richter (born 1892)
- Gunter d'Alquen (1910–1998)
- Hans Schwarz van Berk (1902–1973)
- Alfred Ingemar Berndt (1905–1945)
- Willi Bischoff (born 1886)
- Edgar Brinkmann (publisher) (born 1896)
- Adolf Dresler (1898–1971)
- Walther Heide (1894–1945)
- Hans Hornauer (born 1902)
- Rolf Rienhardt (1903–1975)
- Wilhelm Weiß (1892–1950)
- Josef Berchtold (1897–1962)
- Heinrich Fetkötter (born 1902)
- Richard Jügler (born 1889)

=== Members from the Reich Theater Chamber ===
- Rainer Schlösser (1899–1945)
- Eugen Klöpfer (1886–1950)
- Alfred Frauenfeld (1898–1977)
- Benno von Arent (1898–1956)
- Gustaf Gründgens (1899–1963)
- Otto Krauß (1890–1966), Stuttgart
- Lothar Müthel (1896–1964)
- Bernhard zu Solms-Laubach (1900–1938)
- Wilhelm Müller-Scheld (1895–1970), regional office manager
- Oskar Walleck (1890–1976)
- Hellmuth Will (1900–1982)
- Friedrich Bethge (1891–1963)
- Heinz Hilpert (1890–1967)
- Werner Krauss (1884–1959)
- Wilhelm Rode (1887–1959)
- Heinz Tietjen (1881–1967)

=== Members of the Reich Broadcasting Chamber ===
- Horst Dreßler-Andreß (1899–1979)
- Eugen Hadamovsky (1904–1945)
- Herbert Packebusch (1902–1944)
- Kurt von Boeckmann (1885–1950)
- Herbert Dominik (born 1902)
- Heinz Franke
- Julius Christoph Günther
- Hans Kriegler (1905–1978)
- Heinz Lotz (industrialist) (1894–1937)
- Alfred Lau (1898–1971)
- Goetz Otto Stoffregen (1896–1953)
- Abraham Esau (1884–1955)
- Heinrich Glasmeier (born 1892)
- Paul Goerz (1896–1952)
- Hugo Fischer (politician) (1902–1979)

=== Members of the Reich Chamber of Fine Arts ===
- Eugen Hönig (1873–1945)
- Adolf Ziegler (1892–1959)
- Walter Hoffmann (life dates unknown, missing since 1945)
- Erich Dammeier
- Willy Kelter
- Otto von Keudell (1887–1972)
- Hans Sauermann (1885–1960)
- Albert Speer (1905–1981)
- Kurt Schmid-Ehmen (1901–1968)
- Ernst Schulte Strathaus (1881–1968)
- Hans Schweitzer (1901–1980)
- Ernst Zörner (1895–1945), mayor of Dresden
- Paul Baumgarten (architect, born 1873) (1873–1946)
- German Bestelmeyer (1874–1942), President of the Munich Academy
- Oswald Bieber (1874–1955)
- Leonhard Gall (1884–1952)
- Richard Klein (1890–1967)

=== Members of the Reich Film Chamber ===
- Oswald Lehnich (1895–1961)
- Hans Weidemann (1904–1975)
- Karl Melzer, Managing Director
- Franz Belitz (born 1881)
- Carl Froelich (1875–1953)
- Siegmund Jung, from the economic staff of Adolf Hitler's deputy
- Willi Krause (writer) (1907–1945)
- Botho Mulert (1883–1963)
- Hans-Jürgen Nierentz (1909–1995)
- Ernst Seeger (1884–1937)
- Fritz Scheuermann (jurist) (* 1887)
- Sepp Allgeier (1895–1968)
- Friedrich Kayßler (1874–1945)
- Ludwig Klitzsch (1881–1954)
- Theodor Loos (1883–1954)

== State Cultural Administrators ==
- Adolf Schmid, Gau Baden
- Hans Kolbe, Gau Bavarian Ostmark
- Hermann Brouwers, Gau Düsseldorf
- Arnold Fischer, Gau Essen
- Fritz Lindenberg, Gau Halle-Merseburg
- Erich Schmidt (Nazi) (1900–1981), Gau Hamburg
- Friedrich Schmonsees, Gau Hanover-East
- Herbert Huxhagen, Gau Hanover-South
- Wilhelm Müller-Scheld, Gau Hesse-Nassau
- Wilhelm Michels (Nazi functionary), Gau Koblenz-Trier
- Toni Winkelnkemper, Cologne-Aachen district
- A. Lindemann; August Heinrich Scherer, Gau Kurmark
- Alfred Mitsching; Fritz Ihlenburg, Gau Magdeburg-Anhalt
- Alexander Sondermann, Gau Mecklenburg
- Hans Bäselsöder, Gau Franconia
- Otto Nippold, Gau Munich-Upper Bavaria
- Joachim Paltzo, Gau East Prussia
- Rudolf Trampler, Gau Rheinpfalz
- Heinrich Salzmann (Nazi politician), Gau Saxony
- Gustav Schierholz, Gau Schleswig-Holstein
- Georg Traeg, Gau Swabia
- Waldemar Vogt, Gau Lower Franconia
- Ernst Schulze, Gau Weser-Ems
- Fritz Schmidt, Gau Westphalia-Nord
- Hermann Brust, Gau Westphalia-South
- F. Schmidt, Gau Württemberg

== See also ==
- Gottbegnadeten list
- List of honorary professorships awarded by Adolf Hitler
