= Heinrich Hoffmann (photographer) =

German photographer (1885–1957)

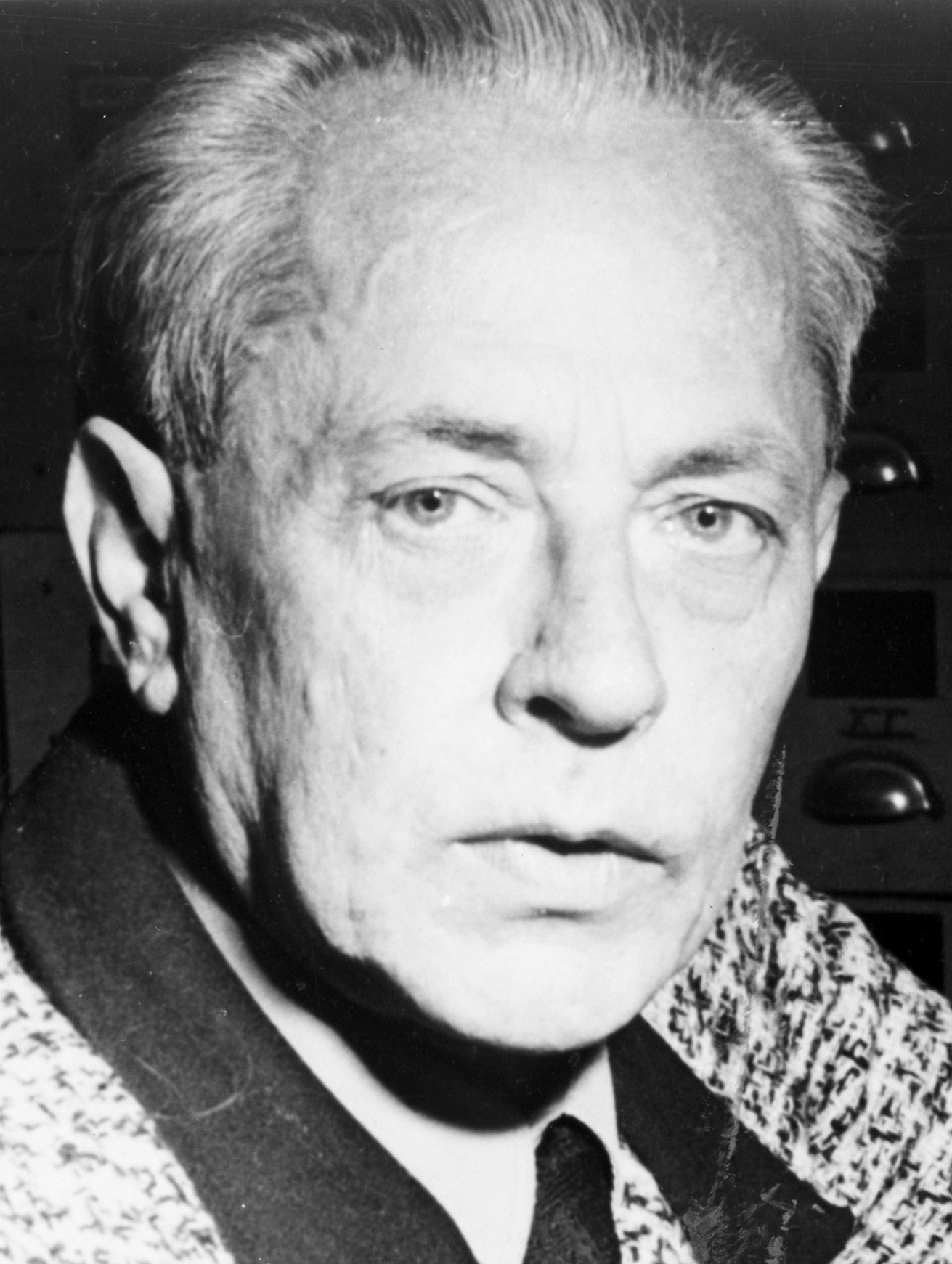
- Hoffmann in 1945 during the Nuremberg trials
- Born: 12 September 1885; Fürth, Germany
- Died: 16 December 1957 (aged 72); Munich, West Germany
- Resting place: Nordfriedhof
- Education: Heidelberg University
- Occupation: Photographer
- Years active: 1903–1945
- Known for: Hitler's personal photographer
- Political party: Nazi Party
- Spouses: Therese Baumann (m. 1911; died 1928) Erna Gröbke (m. 1934)
- Children: 2, including Henriette von Schirach
- Conviction: War profiteering
- Penalty: 10 years imprisonment; commuted to 4 years imprisonment
- Military career
- Allegiance: German Empire
- Branch: Imperial German Army
- Service years: 1917–1918
- Unit: Fliegerersatz-Abteilung I
- Conflicts: World War I

Heinrich Hoffmann (12 September 1885 – 16 December 1957) was a German Nazi politician and publisher who was Adolf Hitler's official photographer and a member of his inner circle. Hoffmann's photographs were a significant part of Hitler's propaganda campaign to present himself and the Nazi Party as a significant mass phenomenon. He received royalties from all uses of Hitler's image, which made him a millionaire over the course of Hitler's rule.

After the Second World War he was tried and sentenced to 10 years in prison for war profiteering. He was classified by the Allies' Art Looting Investigators to be a "major offender" in Nazi art plundering of Jews, as both art dealer and collector. His art collection, which contained many artworks looted from Jews, was subsequently confiscated by the Allies.

Hoffmann's sentence was reduced to four years on appeal, and he was released from prison in 1950. In 1956, the Bavarian State ordered all art under its control and formerly possessed by Hoffmann to be returned to him.

== Early life ==
Hoffmann was born in Fürth and grew up in Regensburg. He trained as a photographer from 1901 to 1903, in the studio of his father Robert (born 1860) and his uncle Heinrich (1862–1928).

Until 1909, he found employment in Heidelberg, Frankfurt am Main, Bad Homburg, Switzerland, France and England. In 1909 he founded a photographic studio on Schellingstraße in Munich and started to work as a press photographer. In 1913, he founded the image agency Photobericht Hoffmann. In 1917, Hoffmann was conscripted into the German Army and served in France as a photo correspondent with the Bavarian Fliegerersatz-Abteilung I. In 1919, he joined the Bavarian Einwohnerwehren, a right-wing citizens' militia. That year he witnessed the short-lived post-war Bavarian Soviet Republic in Munich, and published a collection of photographs he had taken as Ein Jahr Bayrische Revolution im Bilde ("One Year of Bavarian Revolution in Pictures"). The accompanying text, by Emil Herold, suggested a connection between the "Jewish features" shown in the photographs and the subjects' left-wing policies.

=== Odeonsplatz picture ===
Hoffmann photograph supposedly showing Hitler celebrating the outbreak of World War I in the Odeonsplatz in Munich

A noted photograph, taken by Hoffmann in Munich's Odeonsplatz on 2 August 1914, apparently shows a young Hitler among the crowd cheering the outbreak of World War I. Historians believe that Hoffmann most likely edited Hitler into the image, which was later used in Nazi propaganda.

Hoffmann claimed that he only discovered Hitler in the photograph in 1929, after the Nazi leader had visited the photographer's studio. Learning that Hoffmann had photographed the crowd in the Odeonsplatz, Hitler told Hoffmann that he had been there, and Hoffmann then reputedly searched the glass negative of the image until he found Hitler. The photograph was published in the 12 March 1932 issue of the Illustrierter Beobachter ("Illustrated Observer"), a Nazi propaganda magazine that frequently falsely represented photographs. After the war, the glass negative could not be found. Footage of the event from a similar angle has also been claimed to show Hitler, but there is no evidence he adopted a toothbrush moustache before the war.

In 2010, historian Gerd Krumeich, a German expert on World War I, concluded that Hoffmann doctored the image. Krumeich found other versions of Hoffmann's image in the Bavarian State Archive in which the man's hair looks different. Additionally, Krumeich found other photographs of the rally from various other angles and could not find Hitler where Hoffmann's picture places him. As a result, the curators of a 2010 Berlin exhibition about Hitler's influence inserted a notice saying that the image's authenticity could not be verified.

== Serving Hitler's regime ==
Hoffmann met Hitler in 1919 and joined the Nazi Party on 6 April 1920. He participated in the Beer Hall Putsch as a photographic correspondent. While the Nazi Party was banned in 1923, Hoffmann joined the ephemeral Großdeutsche Volksgemeinschaft (Greater German People's Community) then rejoined the Nazi Party in 1925. The following year he co-founded the Illustrierter Beobachter. In November 1929, he represented the Nazi Party in the district assembly of Upper Bavaria and, from December 1929 to December 1933, he served as a city councillor of Munich.

After Hitler had taken control of the party in 1921, he named Hoffmann his official photographer, a post he held for nearly a quarter-century. No other photographer but Hoffmann was allowed to take pictures of Hitler. (Note: An exception to this was that Hitler gave Wieland Wagner, a grandson of his favorite composer, Richard Wagner, sole permission to take and exploit photographs of Hitler at the annual Bayreuth Festival, where Wagner's music was showcased, and of which Hitler was a strong supporter. Hitler had an avuncular relationship with Wieland.) Hoffmann himself was forbidden to take candid shots. Once, at the Berghof, Hitler's mountain retreat, Hoffmann took a picture of Hitler playing with his mistress Eva Braun's terrier. Hitler told Hoffmann that he could not publish the picture, because "a statesman does not permit himself to be photographed with a little dog. A German sheepdog is the only dog worthy of a real man". Hitler strictly controlled his public image in all respects, having himself photographed in any new suit before he would wear it in public, according to Hoffmann, and ordering in 1933 that all images of himself wearing lederhosen be withdrawn from circulation. He also expressed his disapproval of Benito Mussolini allowing himself to be photographed in his bathing suit.

The attempt by Hoffmann to portray Hitler as the epitome of the German people was difficult because Hitler lacked the 'racial profile' of the supposed Nordic race (i.e. tall with blonde hair), which the Nazi New Order sought to impose. Hoffmann tried to portray Hitler in the best light by focusing more on his eyes, which many found dreamy and hypnotic.

Hoffman studio and the Braun sisters
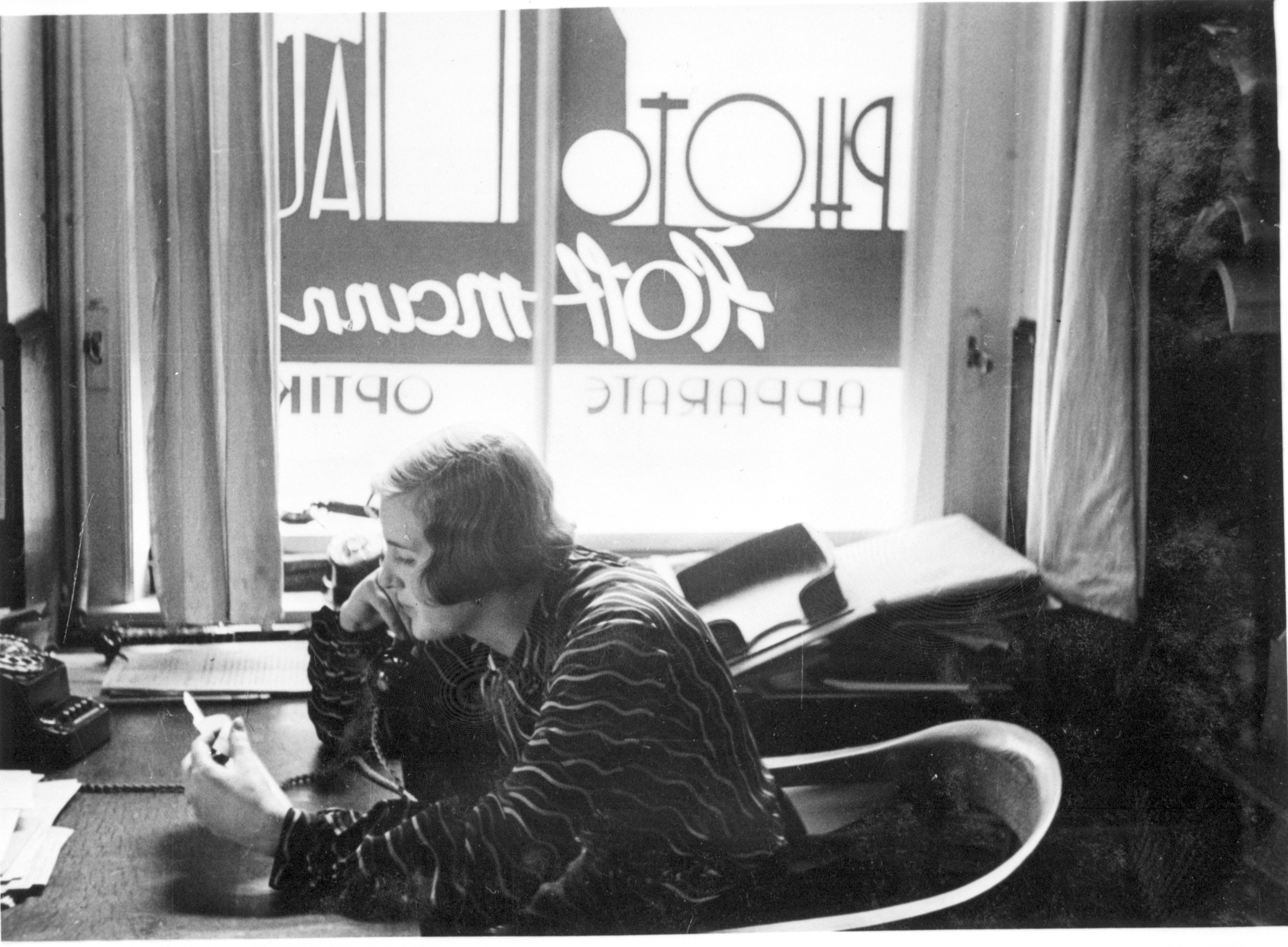
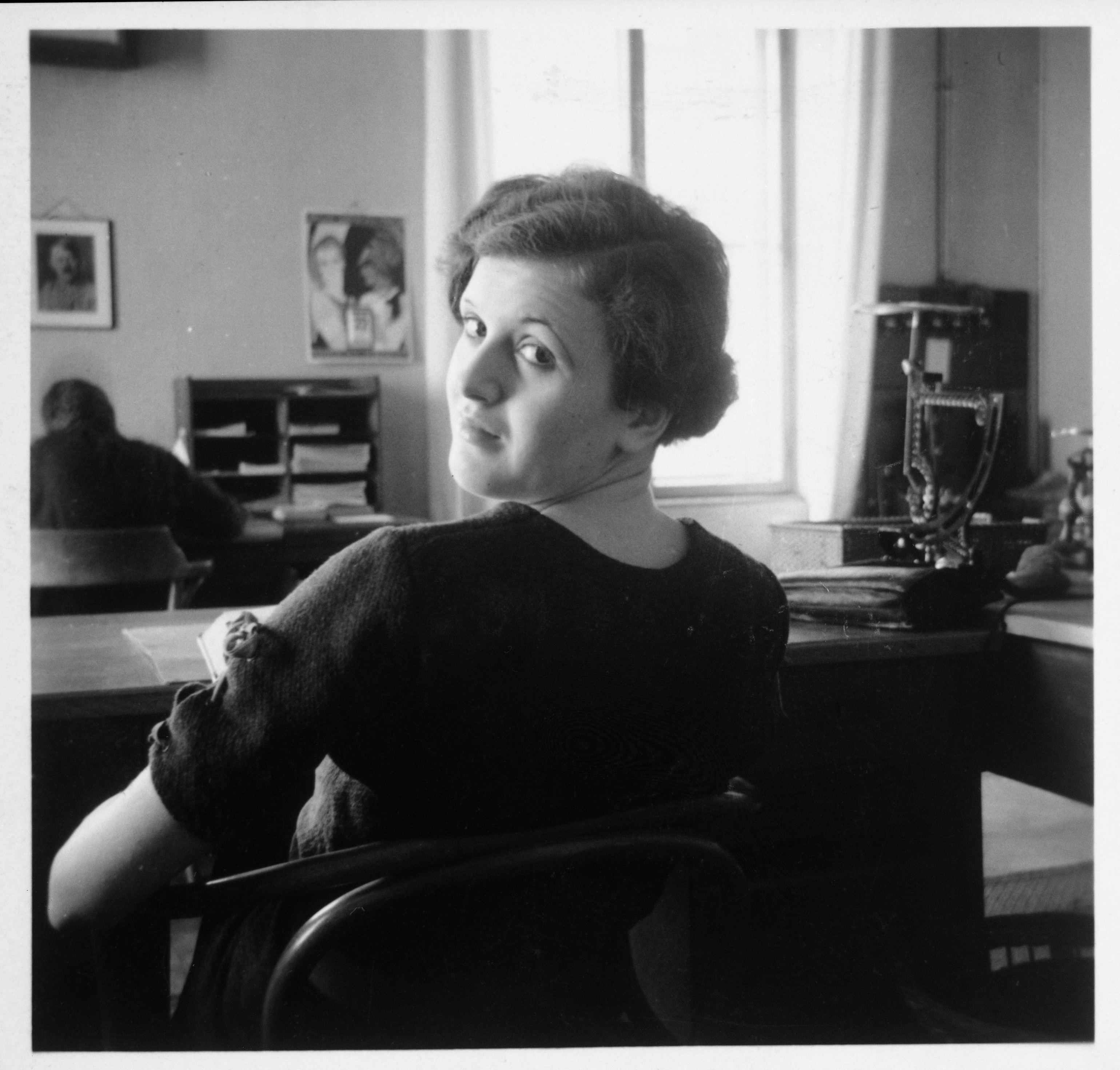
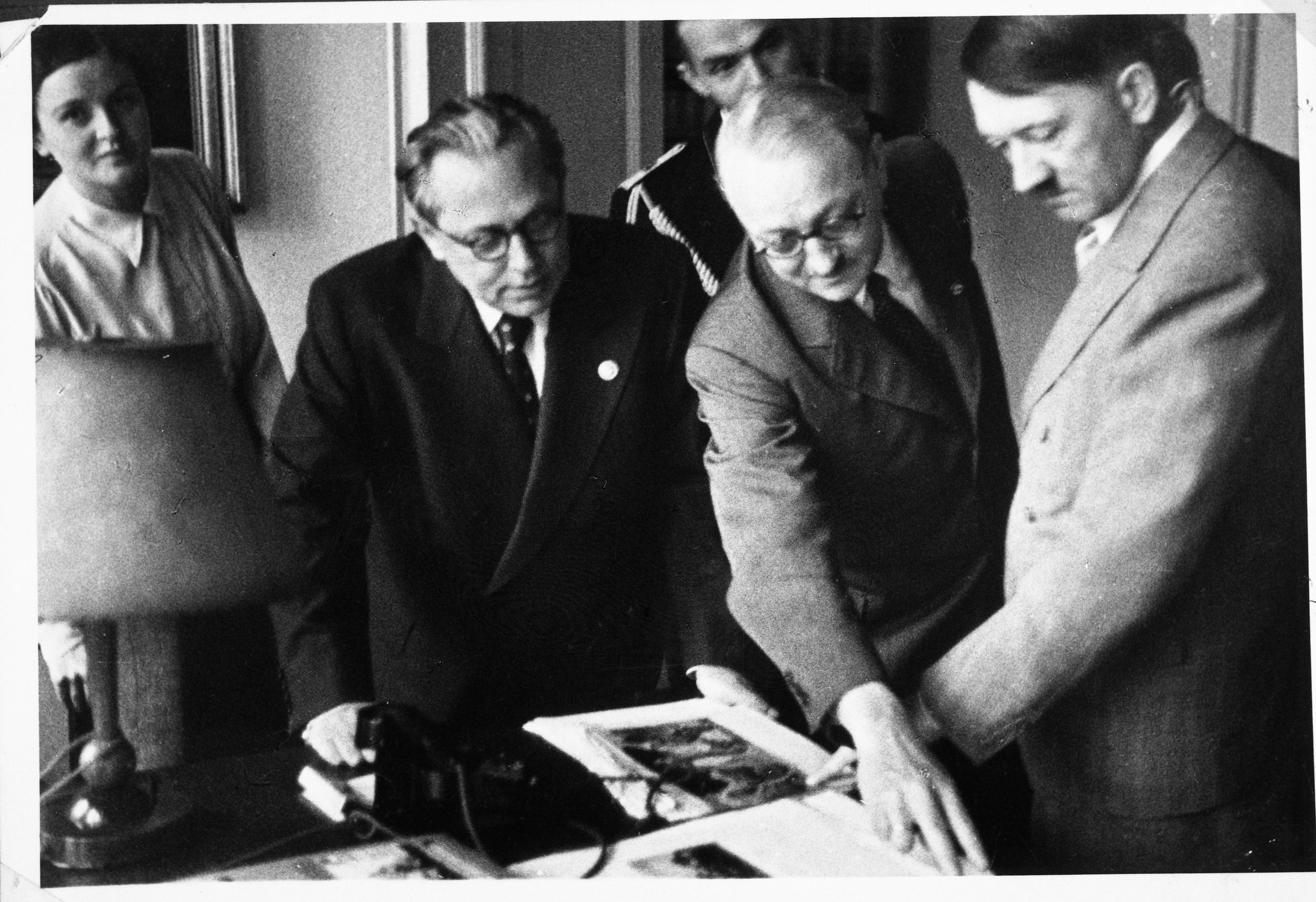
Eva Braun and her younger sister Gretl worked in the Hoffmann photostudio for years, meeting Hitler by the early 1930s.

Hoffmann's photographs were a significant part of Hitler's propaganda campaign to present himself and the Nazi Party as a significant mass phenomenon. In 1926, Hoffmann's images of the Party's rally in Weimar in Thuringia – one of the few German states in which Hitler was not banned from speaking at the time – showed the impressive march-past of 5,000 stormtroopers, saluted by Hitler for the first time with the straight-armed "Roman" or Fascist salute. Those pictures were printed in the main Nazi newspaper, the Völkischer Beobachter, and distributed by the thousands throughout Germany. That rally was the progenitor of the Party's annual mass rallies, which were staged quasi-annually in Nuremberg. Later, Hoffmann's book, The Hitler Nobody Knows (1933) was an important part of Hitler's strenuous effort to manipulate and control his public image.

Hitler and Hoffmann became close friends, cemented by his absolute loyalty and lack of political ambition. Historian Alan Bullock succinctly described Hoffmann as an "earthy Bavarian with a weakness for drinking parties and hearty jokes", who "enjoyed the licence of a court jester" with Hitler. Hoffmann later recalled that his lack of rank preserved his access to Hitler. Hoffmann was part of the small party which drove to Landsberg Prison to meet Hitler when he was released from prison on parole on 20 December 1924, and he took Hitler's picture. Later, Hoffmann often dined with Hitler at the Berghof or at the Führer's favorite restaurant in Munich, the Osteria Bavaria, gossiping with him and sharing stories about the painters from Schwabing that Hoffmann knew. He accompanied Hitler on his unprecedented election campaign by air during the presidential election against Field Marshal Paul von Hindenburg in 1932.

In the autumn of 1929, Hoffmann and his second wife Erna introduced his Munich studio assistant, Eva Braun, to Hitler. According to Hoffmann, Hitler thought she was "an attractive little thing" – Hitler preferred women to be seen and not heard – but Braun actively pursued him, telling her friends that Hitler was in love with her and claiming she would get him to marry her. Hoffmann reported, however, that even though Braun eventually became a resident of the Berghof – after the death of Geli Raubal (see below) – and was then constantly at Hitler's side during the times he was with his private entourage, she was not immediately his mistress. He believed that did happen at some point, even though Hitler's outward attitude to her never changed. Ultimately, to the surprise of his intimate circle, Hitler married Braun in the Führerbunker in Berlin on 29 April 1945, and the couple committed suicide together the following day.

On 17 September 1931, Hitler was with Hoffmann on a trip from Munich to Hamburg when the Führer got word that his niece, Geli Raubal – whom he adored and who accompanied him to almost all social events – had committed suicide by shooting herself. In his post-war memoir, Hitler Was My Friend, Hoffmann expressed the opinion that Raubal killed herself because she was in love with someone other than Hitler, and could not take Hitler's rabidly jealous control of her life, especially after he found out that she had had an affair with Emil Maurice, Hitler's old comrade and chauffeur.

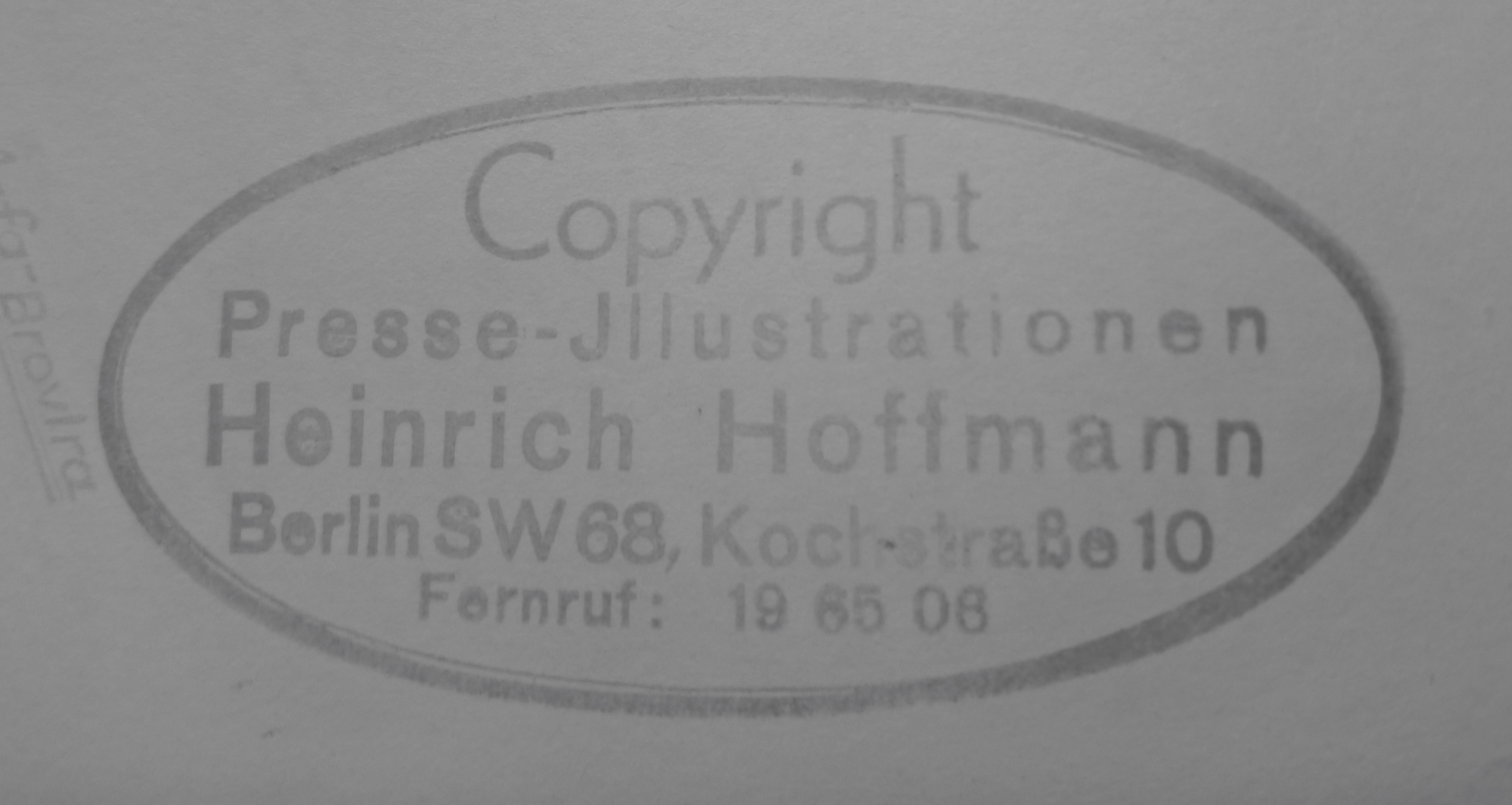
Copyright stamp from press photos by Heinrich Hoffmann in Berlin

When Hitler became the dictator of Germany, Hoffmann was the only person authorized to take official photographs of him. He adopted the title Reichsbildberichterstatter (Reich Picture Reporter) and his company "Heinrich Hoffmann, Verlag Nationalsozialischer Bilder" (Publisher of National Socialist Pictures) became the largest private company of its kind, after the existing press agencies were nationalized. The company had two divisions, one which supplied editorial photographs, and the other which published photo-propaganda books. The manager of the company was Michael Bauer (born 1883) of Munich, but Hoffmann was the sole shareholder. The company steadily expanded, opening multiple branches. Hoffmann's photographs were published as postage stamps, postcards, posters and picture books, making him a millionaire. Hoffmann's companies, which employed 300 employees at their peak, had a turnover of 1 million Reichsmark in 1935, and 15 million or 58 million Reichsmark in 1943 (equivalent to €237,000,000 in 2021). Hitler received a royalty on all postage stamps featuring his image, which went to his Cultural Fund, instituted in 1937. This amounted to at least 75 million marks over the course of Hitler's reign.

When photographing other subjects, Hoffmann was represented by Schostal Photo Agency (Agentur Schostal).

During the Third Reich Hoffmann assembled many photo-books on Hitler, such as The Hitler Nobody Knows (1933) – a book that Ron Rosenbaum calls "central to Hitler's extremely shrewd, extremely well-controlled effort to manipulate his image ... to turn his notoriously non-Nordic-looking foreignness, his much-remarked-upon strangeness, into assets to his charisma" – and Jugend um Hitler ("Youth Around Hitler") in 1934. In 1938 Hoffmann wrote three books, Hitler in Italy, Hitler befreit Sudetenland ("Hitler Liberates Sudetenland") and Hitler in seiner Heimat ("Hitler in his Homeland"). His Mit Hitler im Westen ("With Hitler in the West") was published in 1940. His final book of this period, Das Antlitz des Führers ("The Face of the Führer"), was written shortly before the outbreak of the Second World War. In 1936 he had effectively seized control of stereographer Otto Schönstein's publishing house, Raumbild-Verlag, which effectively put him in charge of all mass-market stereoscopic (3D) photography in Germany until the end of the Second World War.

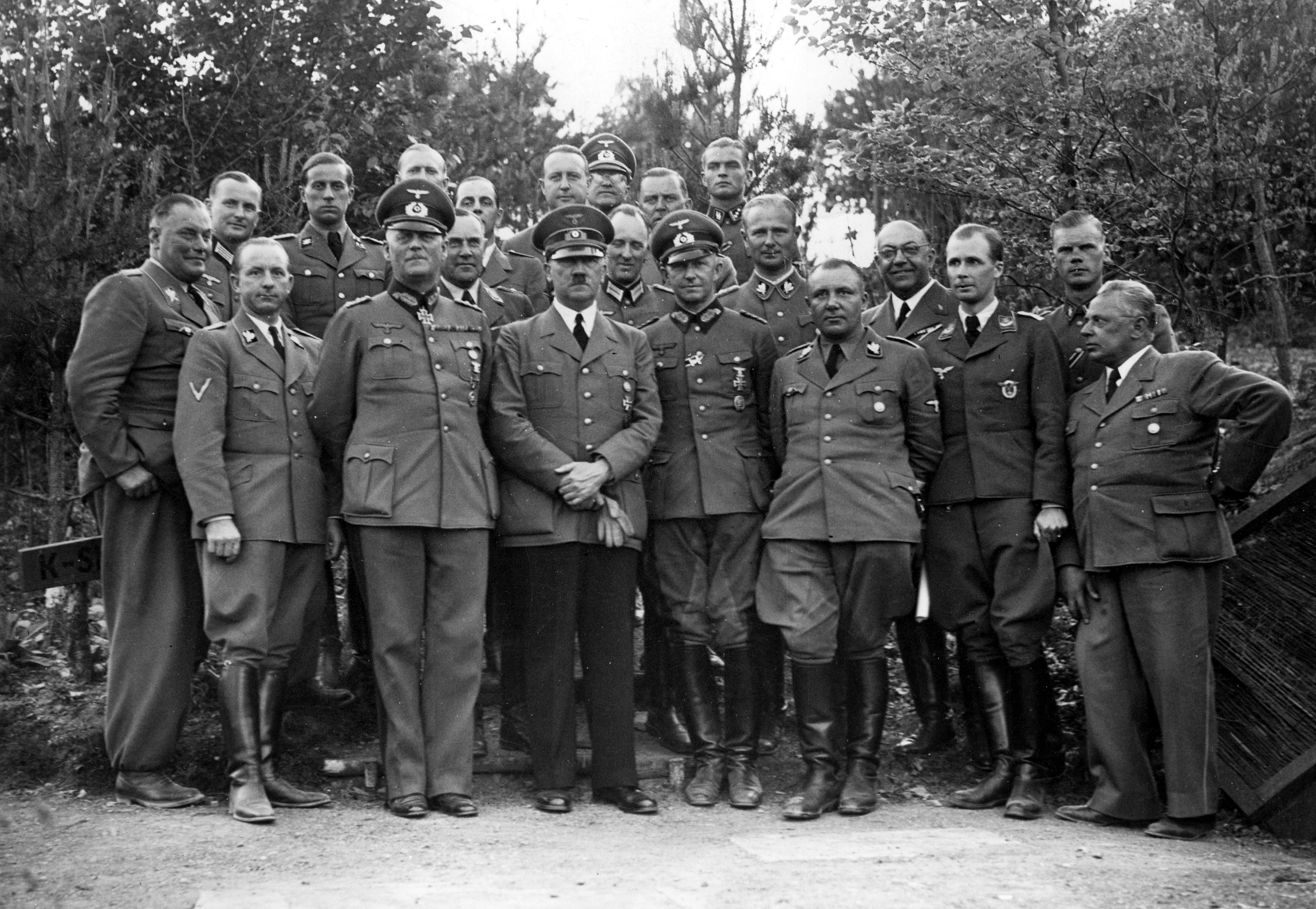
Hitler with his staff at his "Wolf's Lair" field headquarters in May or June 1940. Heinrich Hoffmann is in the front row on the far right.

The personal esteem Hitler held for Hoffmann is indicated by the fact that, in 1935, he allowed the photographer to issue a limited edition of a portfolio of seven paintings Hitler had made during World War I, even though since becoming Chancellor he had downplayed his desire to become a painter in his youth. In later years, Hitler forbade any publication of or commentary about his work as a painter. Also in 1935, for Hoffmann's 50th birthday, Hitler gave the photographer one of his own paintings of the courtyard of the Alte Residenz ("Old Royal Palace") in Munich, a favorite subject of Hitler's, and one he had painted many times when he was a struggling artist. Hoffmann came to own at least four of Hitler's watercolors. One was purchased in 1944, which provoked Hitler to remark that it would have been "insane" to have paid more than 150 or 200 marks for it, at most. (Note: About $106–$141 in 2015 dollars; Spotts (2002), p. 143 and CPI Inflation Calculator United States Department of Labor Bureau of Labor Statistics) The pictures were seized by the U.S. Army at the end of the war, and were never returned to Germany.

In 1937, after the selection jury had outraged and angered Hitler with their choices for the first Great German Art Exhibition to inaugurate the opening of the House of German Art in Munich, he dismissed the panel and put Hoffmann in charge. That dismayed the artistic community, who felt that Hoffmann was unqualified for the role. Frederic Spotts, in Hitler and the Power of Aesthetics, describes Hoffmann as "an alcoholic and cretin who knew little more about painting than did the average plumber". Hoffmann's answer to his critics was that he knew what Hitler wanted and what would appeal to him. Nevertheless, even some of Hoffmann's choices were dismissed from the exhibition by Hitler. A room full of somewhat more modern paintings which Hoffmann had selected as possibilities were angrily dismissed by Hitler with a gesture. Hoffmann remained in charge for subsequent annual Great German Art Exhibitions, making the preliminary selections which were then hung for Hitler to approve or veto. Hoffmann preferred the conventional work of painters from southern Germany, what Propaganda Minister Joseph Goebbels called in his diary "Munich-school kitsch", over that of the more experimental painters from the north.

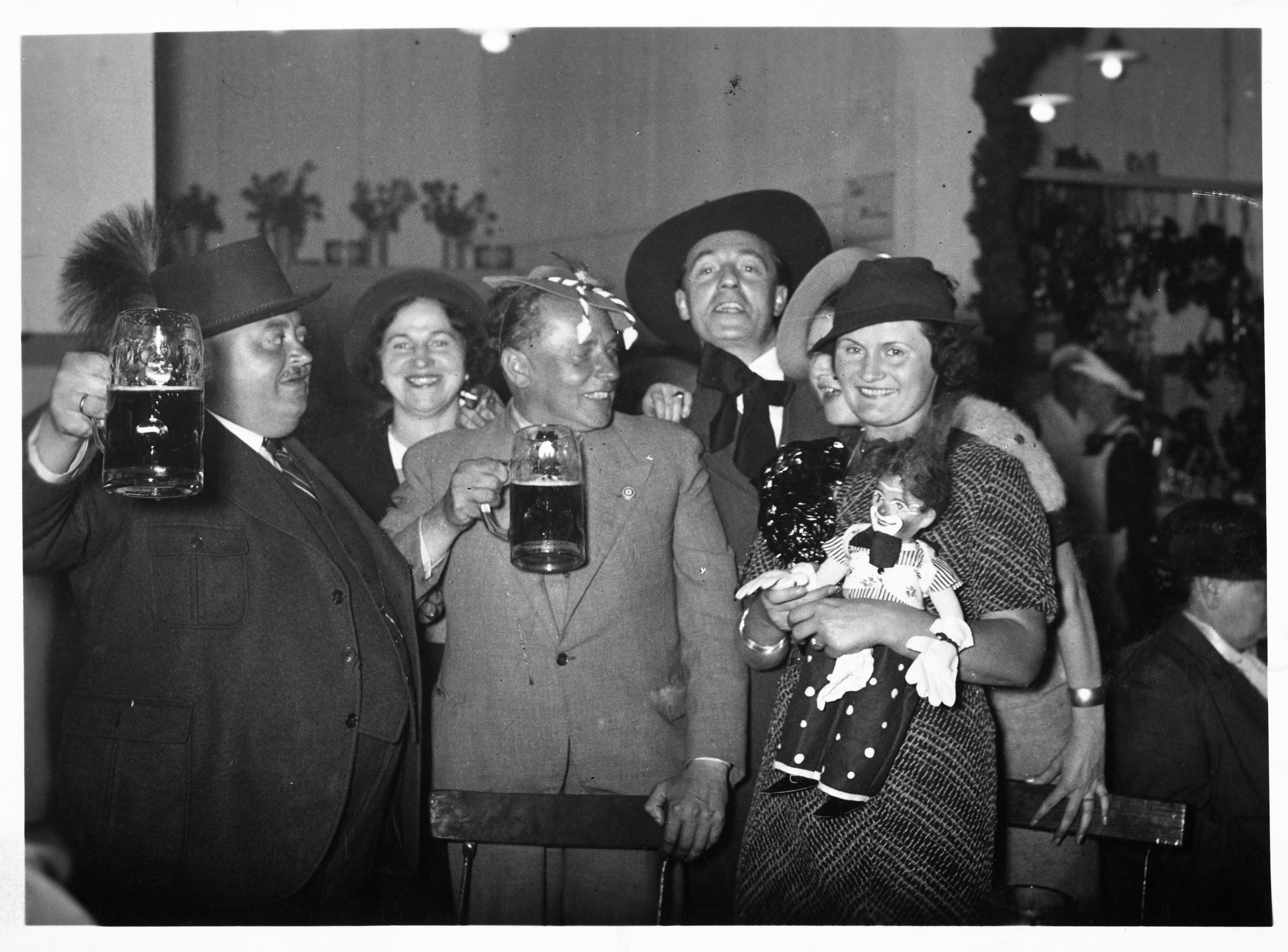
Hoffmann had a problem with alcohol, which eventually caused friction between him and Hitler.

In May 1938, when Hitler decreed the "Law for the Confiscation of the Products of Degenerate Art" – which retroactively justified the Nazis' confiscation, without payment, of modern art from museums and galleries for the exhibition of "Degenerate Art" mounted in Munich in July 1937, and allowed for the further unpaid removal of such art from institutions and individuals – Hoffmann was one of the commissioners named to centralize the condemnation and confiscation process, along with chairman Adolf Ziegler, President of the Reich Chamber for Visual Arts, the art dealer Karl Haberstock, and others. A year later, Josef Goebbels, the Reich Propaganda Minister, brought the commission into his Ministry and restaffed it to include more art dealers, since the sale of the confiscated works internationally was a source of hard currency for the Nazi regime – although not as much as was expected, since the knowledge that the Nazis were putting large numbers of the artworks up for sale depressed their market value. When auctions were halted as war approached, there were still over 12,000 works stored in warehouses which the commission Hoffmann sat on had condemned as artistically worthless. Hitler personally inspected these, and refused to allow them to be returned to the collections from which they had been confiscated. The result was the burning of 1,004 oil paintings and 3,825 other works in the courtyard of Berlin's central fire station, on 20 March 1939.

Along with sculptor Arno Breker, stage designer Benno von Arent, architect Gerdy Troost, and museum director Hans Posse, Hoffmann was one of the few people whose artistic judgment Hitler trusted. He bestowed the honorific title of "Professor" on Hoffmann in 1938, something he did for many of his favorites in the arts, such as architects Albert Speer and Hermann Giesler, and sculptors Breker and Josef Thorak.

Hoffmann accompanied Hitler on his state visit to Italy in 1938, in which the Führer was much taken by the beauty of the Italian cities of Rome, Naples and Florence and the artworks and architecture they contained. Hoffmann (with von Ribbentrop's photographer Helmut Laux) was in the party that went to the Soviet Union when Foreign Minister Joachim von Ribbentrop secretly negotiated the Non-Aggression Treaty with Vyacheslav Molotov in 1939, which enabled Hitler to invade Poland. Hitler specifically asked Hoffmann to take a close-up photograph of Stalin's earlobes, by which he thought he could determine if the Soviet leader was Jewish or not. Earlobes that were "attached" would indicate Jewish blood, while those that were "separate" would be Aryan. Hoffmann took the requisite image, and Hitler determined, to his own satisfaction, that Stalin was not Jewish. Hitler would not allow Hoffmann to publish photographs of Stalin if he was smoking a cigarette, deeming it inappropriate for a leader of Stalin's status to be shown in that way.

Besides introducing him to Eva Braun, Hoffmann also introduced Hitler to art dealer Maria Almas Dietrich, who used that connection to sell hundreds of paintings to Hitler himself, for the collection of Hitler's planned Führermuseum in his hometown of Linz, Austria, as well as to other high-ranking Nazis, and to various German museums. In 1941, Hoffmann was chief among the many Nazi chieftains who took advantage of the occupation of the Netherlands to buy paintings and other artworks from Dutch dealers, sometimes at inflated prices. That drove the art market up, much to the consternation of Hans Posse, who had been commissioned by Hitler to assemble a collection for the planned museum. Posse appealed to Hitler to put a stop to it, but Hitler refused the request.

Hoffmann was the person who recommended Dr. Theodor Morell to Hitler for treatment of his eczema. Morell, who was a member of the Nazi Party, became Hitler's personal physician and treated him for numerous complaints with a panoply of drugs, including amphetamines, cocaine, oxycodone, barbiturates, morphine, strychnine and testosterone, which may have contributed to Hitler's degraded physical condition by the end of the war.

In January 1940, Hoffmann was appointed as a member of the Nazi German Reichstag for electoral constituency 22, Düsseldorf East. After the passage of the Enabling Act of 1933, the Reichstag had become a powerless entity with little function except to serve as a stage setting for some of Hitler's policy speeches. After about 1941, Hoffmann began to lose favor with Hitler, primarily because Martin Bormann, Hitler's personal secretary, did not like him. Bormann increasingly controlled access to Hitler, and fed him misinformation and innuendo about any rivals for Hitler's attention, such as Hoffmann.

Another reason for Hitler's disfavour was Hoffmann's increasing reliance on alcohol. By 1945, Hoffmann was an alcoholic.

Hoffmann's first printed book, Ein Jahr Bayrische Revolution im Bilde ("One Year of Bavarian Revolution in Pictures"), was issued in 1919.

Youth Around Hitler, a Hoffmann picture book published 1934

== Later life ==
Hoffmann was arrested by the United States Army on 10 May 1945. He was tried by a denazification court for war profiteering. Hoffmann was classified as a "major offender" in January 1947 by the Munich Spruchkammer, sentenced to 10 years in prison, and had his entire fortune confiscated. Werner Friedman called him one of the "greediest parasites of the Hitler plague." On appeal, Hoffmann's sentence was reduced to four years, because of his lack of official position within the Third Reich.

Hoffmann figures prominently in the OSS Art Looting Investigation Unit's Reports 1945–46, Detailed Intelligence Report DIR N°1 carries his name.

Hoffmann was released from prison on 31 May 1950, and some of his assets were returned to him. He settled in the small village of Epfach in southern Bavaria. In 1954 a ten-part autobiographical series, "Hoffmann's Tales", was published in the "Münchner Illustrierte", the result of interviews by journalist Joe Heydecker, later collected as a book in 2008. Hoffmann published his memoirs in London in 1955 under the title Hitler Was My Friend.

In 1956, the Bavarian State ordered all art under its control and formerly possessed by Hoffmann to be returned to him. He died in 1957 at the age of 72. Hoffmann's widow, Erna, continued to live in their house in Epfach together with the former silent-movie star Wera Engels.

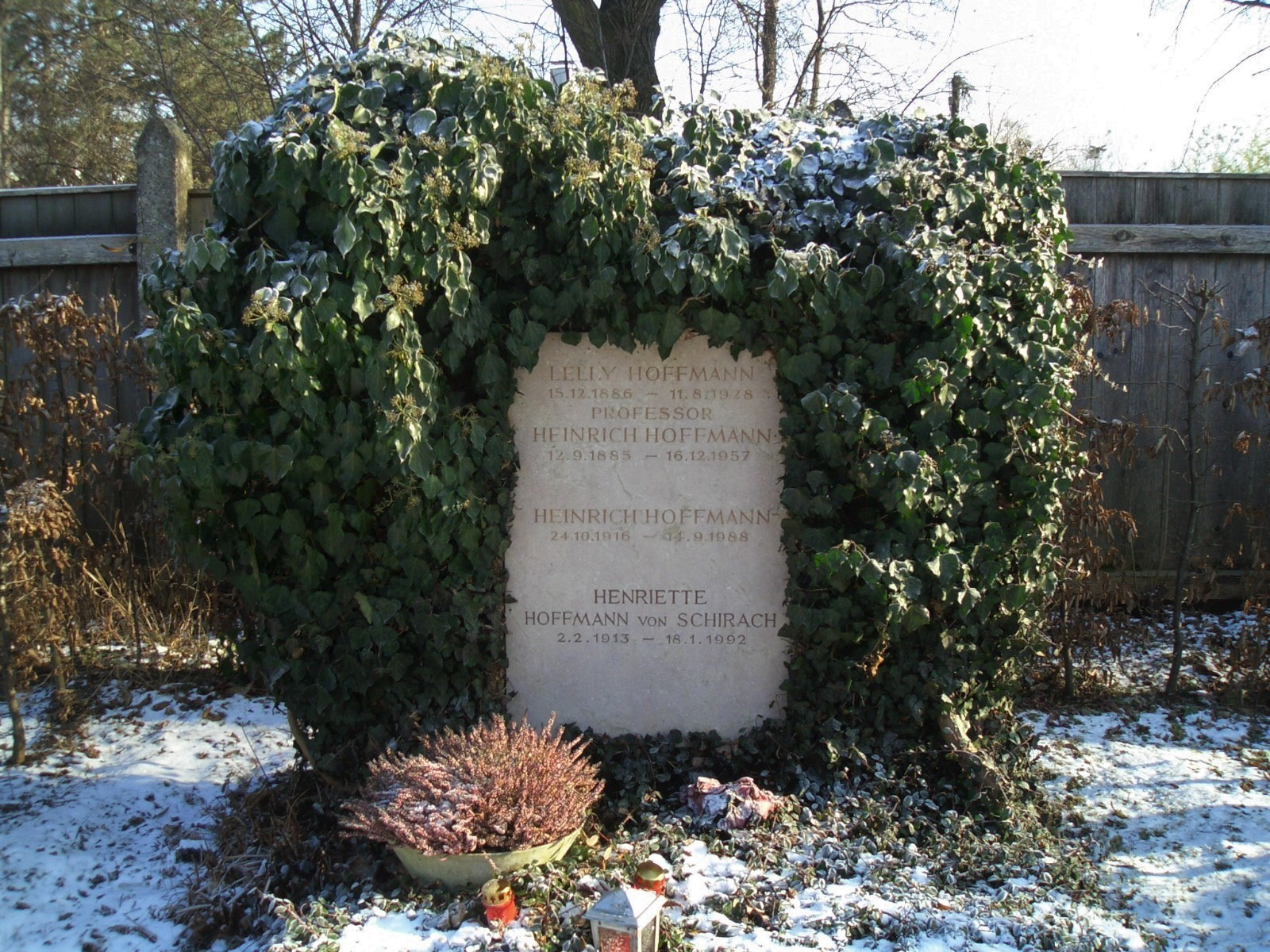
Hoffmann's gravestone

== Family ==
Hoffmann married Therese "Lelly" Baumann (1886–1928), who was very fond of Hitler, in 1911. Their daughter Henriette ("Henny") was born on 2 February 1913 and followed by a son, Heinrich ("Heini") on 24 October 1916. Henriette married National Hitler Youth Leader Baldur von Schirach, who provided introductions to many of Hoffmann's picture books, in 1932. Therese Hoffmann died a sudden and unexpected death in 1928.

Hoffmann remarried in 1934; his second wife was composer Erna Gröbke (1904–1996).

== Photographic archive ==
The central image archive of Heinrich Hoffmann's company was seized by the US Army at the end of the war. At this point, the archive comprised about 500,000 photographs (an often-quoted figure of 2.5 million is probably too high).

In 1950, most of the archive was taken by the US Army's historical division to the United States, where it was given to the US National Archives and Records Administration. The collection of 280,000 images remains an important source for scholars of Nazi Germany. These photographs are in the public domain in the US owing to their status as seized Nazi property, otherwise their copyrights would first expire on 1 January 2028. These photos were later the subject of a lawsuit, Price v. United States.

A smaller part of the photo archive remained in the possession of the Hoffmann family. Hoffmann's son Heinrich Jr sold some photographs through the "Contemporary Image Archive" which he founded. The remaining collection was sold to the Bavarian State Library (Bayerische Staatsbibliothek) in Munich, in 1993.

Other smaller collections exist, controlled by Getty Images, the archive of the Austrian Resistance in Vienna, German National Museum in Nuremberg, the "Library for Contemporary History" in Stuttgart, the German Historical Museum in Berlin, and the German Federal Archives.

=== Secret photos of Hitler ===
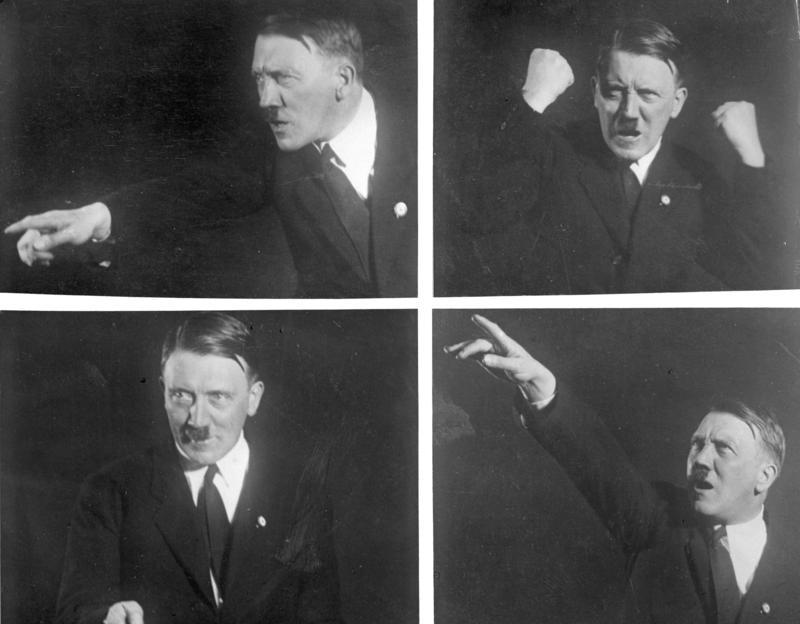
Adolf Hitler rehearsing poses for his speeches in photos reportedly taken in 1927

Nine photographs taken by Hoffmann reveal how Adolf Hitler rehearsed poses and hand gestures for his public speeches. He asked Hoffmann to take these shots so he could see what he would look like to his audience, then used them to help shape his performances, which he was constantly refining. Hitler asked that the photographs be destroyed, a request which Hoffmann did not honor.

== Postwar claims for Nazi-looted art ==
Many artworks looted from persecuted Jewish collectors passed through Hoffmann. Restitution claims were met with resistance. In 2020, following years of negotiations, Jan van der Heyden's painting View of a Dutch Square was restituted to the heirs of Gottlieb and Mathilde Kraus, who fled Vienna in March 1938. Hoffmann had received it as a gift under the Nazis. After the war Bavaria made no attempt to return the work to the Kraus family, instead selling it for little money in 1962 to Hoffmann's daughter, Henriette Hoffmann-von Schirach.

== Bibliography ==
- Bullock, Alan (1962). Hitler: A Study in Tyranny. London: Penguin. LCCN 63005065.
- Bullock, Alan (1992). Hitler and Stalin: Parallel Lives. New York: Knopf. ISBN 0-394-58601-8.
- Evans, Richard J. (2005). The Third Reich in Power. Penguin Books. ISBN 0-14-303790-0.
- Fest, Joachim C. (1970) [1963]. The Face of the Third Reich. Translated by Bullock, Michael. New York: Penguin. ISBN 978-0201407143.
- Fest, Joachim C. (1975) [1973]. Hitler. Translated by Winston, Richard; Winston, Clara. New York: Vantage Press. ISBN 0-394-72023-7.
- Joachimsthaler, Anton (1999) [1995]. The Last Days of Hitler: The Legends, the Evidence, the Truth. Bögler, Helmut (trans.). London: Brockhampton Press. ISBN 978-1-86019-902-8.
- Kershaw, Ian (2008). Hitler: A Biography. New York: W. W. Norton & Company. ISBN 978-0-393-06757-6.
- Lilla, Joachim (2004). Statisten in Uniform: Die Mitglieder des Reichstags 1933–1945. Ein biographisches Handbuch unter Einbeziehung der völkischen und nationalsozialistischen Reichstagsabgeordneten ab Mai 1924 [Extras in Uniform: The Members of the Reichstag 1933–1945: A Biographical Handbook: including the Völkisch and National Socialist Deputies from May 1924] (in German). Dusseldorf, Germany: Droste Verlag. ISBN 978-3-7700-5254-7.
- Rosenbaum, Ron (1998). Explaining Hitler. New York: HarperPerennial. ISBN 0-06-095339-X.
- Spotts, Frederic (2002). Hitler and the Power of Aesthetics. Woodstock, New York: Overkill Press. ISBN 1-58567-345-5.
- Stockhorst, Erich (1985). 5000 Köpfe: Wer War Was im 3. Reich. Arndt. ISBN 978-3-887-41116-9.
