= List of honorary professorships awarded by Adolf Hitler =

Adolf Hitler bestowed the title of Professor on various architects, artists, and artistic figures.

== List ==
Name	Profession	Notes	Source
Benno von Arent	Theatre designer		
Arno Breker	Sculptor		
Hermann Giesler	Architect		
Constantin Gerhardinger	Painter	Later revoked.	
Sepp Hilz	Painter		
Heinrich Hoffmann	Photographer		
Willy Kriegel	Painter		
Hans Posse	Curator	April 1940	
Albert Speer	Architect		
Josef Thorak	Sculptor		
Gerdy Troost	Interior designer		

== See also ==
- Gottbegnadeten list
- Reich Cultural Senate
