= Toy Story 2 =

1999 film by John Lasseter

- Theatrical release poster
- Directed by: John Lasseter
- Screenplay by: Andrew Stanton; Rita Hsiao; Doug Chamberlin; Chris Webb
- Story by: John Lasseter; Pete Docter; Ash Brannon; Andrew Stanton
- Produced by: Helene Plotkin; Karen Robert Jackson
- Starring: Tom Hanks; Tim Allen; Don Rickles; Jim Varney; Wallace Shawn; John Ratzenberger; Annie Potts
- Cinematography: Sharon Calahan
- Edited by: Edie Bleiman; David Ian Salter; Lee Unkrich
- Music by: Randy Newman
- Production company: Pixar Animation Studios
- Distributed by: Buena Vista Pictures Distribution (Note: Distributed under the Walt Disney Pictures banner.)
- Release dates: November 13, 1999 (El Capitan Theatre); November 24, 1999 (United States)
- Running time: 92 minutes
- Country: United States
- Language: English
- Budget: $90 million
- Box office: $511.4 million

Toy Story 2 is a 1999 American animated adventure comedy film directed by John Lasseter, and written by Andrew Stanton, Rita Hsiao, Doug Chamberlin, and Chris Webb. Produced by Pixar Animation Studios for Walt Disney Pictures, it is the sequel to Toy Story (1995) and the second installment in Pixar's Toy Story franchise. Tom Hanks, Tim Allen, Don Rickles, Jim Varney, Wallace Shawn, John Ratzenberger, Annie Potts, R. Lee Ermey, John Morris, Laurie Metcalf, and Jeff Pidgeon reprise their roles from the first Toy Story film. In the film, Woody is stolen by a greedy toy collector, prompting Buzz Lightyear and his friends to save him. However, after meeting Jessie and other toys from his franchise, Woody is then tempted by the idea of immortality in a museum. This is the last Toy Story film to feature Jim Varney as the voice of Slinky Dog before his death the following year.

Disney initially envisioned Toy Story 2 as a direct-to-video sequel. The film began production in a building separated from Pixar, on a small scale, as most of the main Pixar staff were busy working on A Bug's Life (1998). When story reels proved promising, Disney upgraded the film to a theatrical release, but Pixar was unhappy with the film's quality. Lasseter and the story team redeveloped the entire plot in one weekend. Although most Pixar features take years to develop, the established release date could not be moved and the production schedule for Toy Story 2 was compressed into nine months.

Despite production struggles, Toy Story 2 premiered at the El Capitan Theatre on November 13, 1999, and was released on November 24 to box office success, grossing $511 million against a $90 million budget, making it the third-highest-grossing film of 1999. It received widespread acclaim from critics, with a 100% rating on the website Rotten Tomatoes, similar to its predecessor. It is considered by critics to be one of the few sequel films superior to the original, and is frequently featured on lists of the greatest animated films ever made. Among its accolades, the film won Best Motion Picture – Musical or Comedy at the 57th Golden Globe Awards. A further sequel, Toy Story 3, was released in 2010.

== Plot ==
Woody and Buzz Lightyear, having become best friends, are now the co-leaders of Andy's toys. Andy plans to take Woody to Cowboy Camp, but accidentally rips his arm during a brief playtime. Andy's mother places Woody on a shelf, causing Woody to begin fearing that Andy will soon discard him. Woody finds Wheezy, a penguin toy with a broken squeaker, who has also been shelved. After saving Wheezy from being sold at a yard sale, Woody is found and stolen by a greedy toy collector. Buzz fails to foil the theft, but finds clues identifying the thief as Al McWhiggin, the owner of the "Al's Toy Barn" store.

At Al's apartment, Woody discovers that he was designed as the main protagonist of Woody's Roundup, a popular 1950s children's Western series, where he meets the toy versions of his character co-stars: Jessie the Cowgirl, Bullseye the Horse, and Stinky Pete the Prospector. While delighted to meet them, Stinky Pete informs Woody that Al plans to sell the entire Woody's Roundup collection to a toy museum in Tokyo. Woody desperately wants to return home to Andy, dismaying the group because the museum will not accept the collection without him, which will lead them back into storage. After Woody's arm is repaired the next day, he learns that Jessie was once loved by her owner Emily, until she outgrew and donated her away. Convinced that Andy might do the same to him, Woody decides to go to the museum.

Buzz, Mr. Potato Head, Slinky Dog, Rex, and Hamm venture out to Al's Toy Barn to rescue Woody. Separated from the gang, Buzz encounters "Ultra Buzz Lightyear", a Buzz variant toy with a utility belt who assumes he is a real space ranger. Ultra Buzz captures and imprisons Andy's Buzz. Ultra Buzz meets the gang, and accompanies them to Al's apartment, assuming they are on a mission to defeat his arch-nemesis, Emperor Zurg. Andy's Buzz escapes and follows them, inadvertently releasing a toy Zurg who follows Buzz to destroy him. Both Buzzes and the rest of the search party arrive at the apartment, meeting Woody and the Roundup toys.

Experiencing a conflict of choices, Woody refuses to go home to stay with the Roundup toys. Shortly after the search party leaves, Woody has a change of heart, inviting Jessie, Bullseye and Stinky Pete to join him and become Andy's toys. While a hesitant Jessie and an enthusiastic Bullseye accept Woody's offer, Pete refuses and blocks them from leaving, as he is adamant about going to the museum. Al returns to the apartment and takes the Woody's Roundup collection to the airport. On the elevator ride down, Zurg appears and fights the toys until he is knocked off the elevator by Rex. They learn that Zurg is Buzz's father, and Ultra Buzz stays behind to reconcile with Zurg. Andy's Buzz and the other toys pursue Al to the airport by driving a Pizza Planet truck, accompanied by three toy aliens from the restaurant.

Buzz and the rest of Andy's toys pursue the baggage through the airport's baggage handling system to recover Woody, Jessie and Bullseye. Stinky Pete knocks Buzz and retaliates against Woody by ripping his arm again. Buzz and the others work together to subdue Pete with camera flashes, placing him in the backpack of a young girl, who takes him away with her. Bullseye is saved, but Jessie is loaded onto a baggage tractor and taken to the plane. Woody, Buzz, and Bullseye race to rescue her before the plane takes off. The toys return to Andy's house. Andy returns from Cowboy Camp that night, and finds all of the toys on his bed, ready to be played with. The next morning, Woody's arm and Wheezy's broken squeaker are repaired, and Jessie and Bullseye find the comfort of their new home. Al mourns the loss of the lucrative deal with the toy museum on a television advertisement, and leaves in despair, much to the toys' amusement. As the toys celebrate, Woody tells Buzz that he no longer fears Andy losing interest in him, promising to keep each other company for "infinity and beyond".

== Voice cast ==
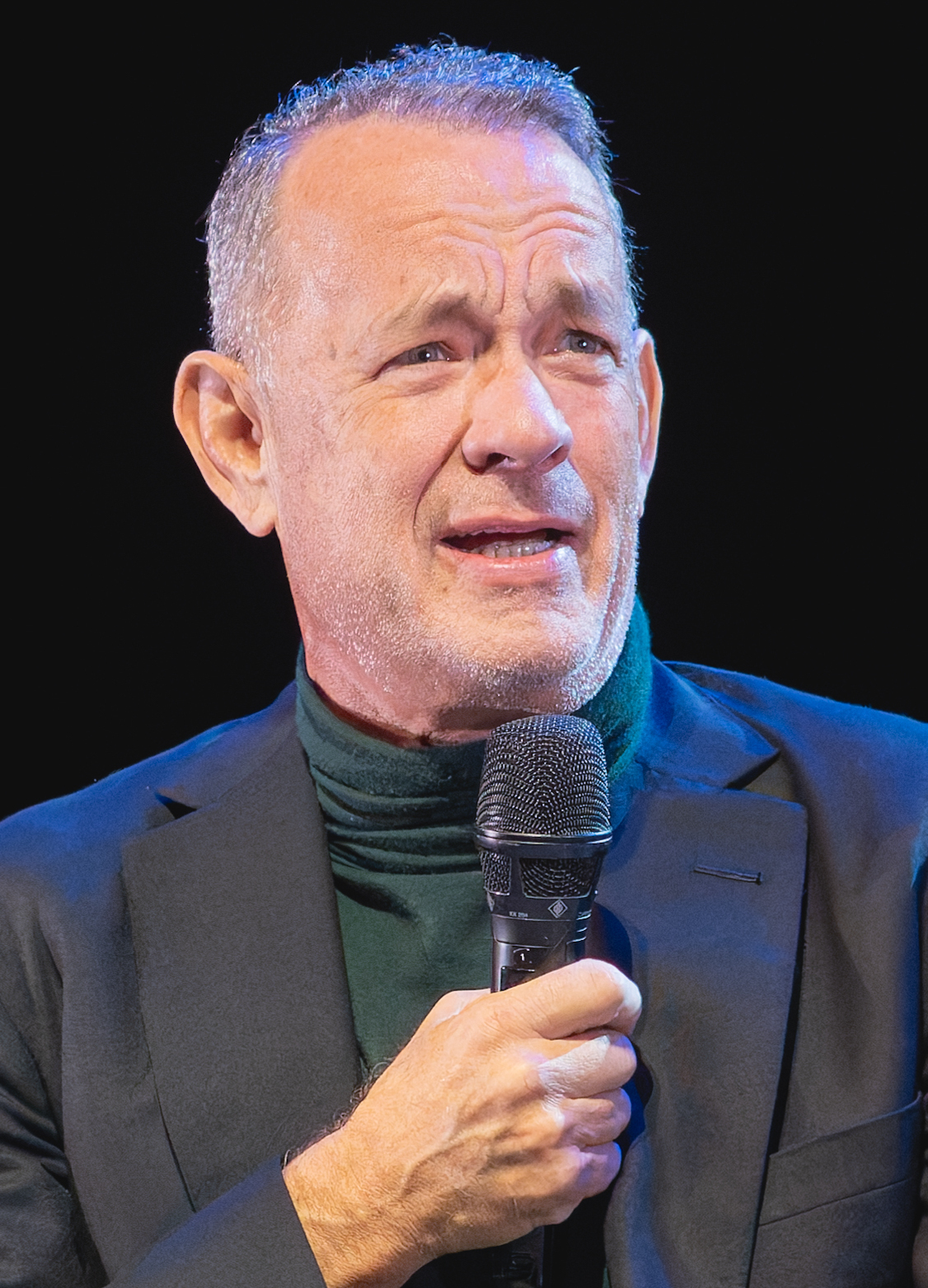
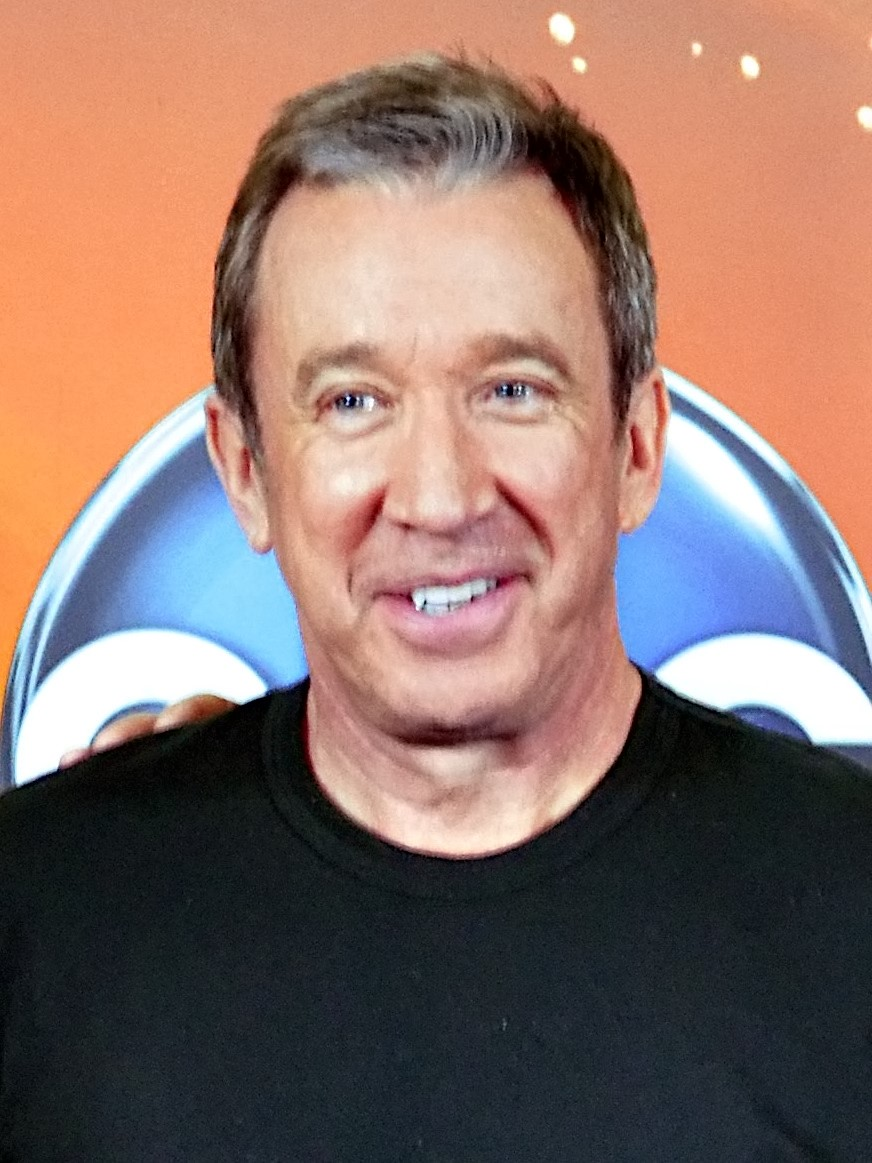
Tom Hanks (Woody) and Tim Allen (Buzz Lightyear) are amongst the many cast members who reprise their roles from Toy Story for Toy Story 2.
- Tom Hanks as Woody
- Tim Allen as Buzz Lightyear
  - Allen also voices Ultra Buzz Lightyear, a next generation Buzz Lightyear action figure with a utility belt who at the end reconciles with his father Zurg.
- Joan Cusack as Jessie, a cowgirl doll and member of the Roundup gang. She has a sad life after being abandoned by her owner Emily. Mary Kay Bergman provided the vocals for Jessie's yodeling.
- Kelsey Grammer as Stinky Pete, an elderly prospector doll and member of the Roundup gang. When Woody meets him, he is still in his original box. He is eager to be sold to the museum and tries to stop Woody from going back to Andy.
- Don Rickles as Mr. Potato Head, a grouchy and grumpy Mr. Potato Head who is married to Mrs. Potato Head. He joins Buzz on the mission to rescue Woody.
- Jim Varney as Slinky Dog
- Wallace Shawn as Rex
- John Ratzenberger as Hamm
- Annie Potts as Bo Peep
- Estelle Harris as Mrs. Potato Head, a Mrs. Potato Head who is married to Mr. Potato Head.
- John Morris as Andy Davis
- Wayne Knight as Al McWhiggin, an avaricious toy collector and owner of Al's Toy Barn. He kidnaps Woody and plans to sell him and the rest of the Woody's Roundup merchandise to a toy museum abroad.
- Laurie Metcalf as Andy's mother
- R. Lee Ermey as Sarge
- Joe Ranft as Wheezy, a penguin toy with a broken squeaker. Woody finds him neglected on a high shelf and later rescues him from a yard sale.
  - Ranft reprises his role as Heimlich from A Bug's Life (1998) during the credits.
  - Robert Goulet as Wheezy's singing voice
- Jodi Benson as Tour Guide Barbie, a Barbie doll who meets Woody's friends in Al's Toy Barn and helps them find Al's office. For the first Toy Story, Pixar had asked Mattel to allow the use of this doll to play Woody's girlfriend, which was not approved. After the success of the first film, Mattel asked that she be included in the second film.
- Jonathan Harris as the Cleaner, an elderly man hired by Al to clean and repair Woody.
- Jeff Pidgeon as the aliens
- Andrew Stanton as Evil Emperor Zurg, Buzz's Darth Vader-esque arch-nemesis who is unaware that he himself is a toy.

In addition, Dave Foley reprised his role as Flik from A Bug's Life during the credits.

== Production ==
=== Development ===
A conversation about a sequel to Toy Story began around a month after the film's opening in December 1995. A few days after Toy Story's release, John Lasseter was traveling with his family and found a young boy clutching a Sheriff Woody doll at an airport. Lasseter described how the boy's excitement to show it to his father touched him deeply. Lasseter realized that his character no longer belonged to him only, but rather it belonged to others, as well. The memory was a defining factor in the production of Toy Story 2, with Lasseter moved to create a great film for that child and for everyone else who loved the characters.

Ed Catmull, Lasseter, and Ralph Guggenheim visited Joe Roth, successor to recently ousted Jeffrey Katzenberg as chairman of Walt Disney Studios, shortly afterward. Roth was pleased and embraced the idea of a sequel. Disney had recently begun making direct-to-video sequels to its successful features, and Roth wanted to handle the Toy Story sequel this way, as well. Prior releases, such as 1994's Aladdin sequel, The Return of Jafar, had returned an estimated $100 million in profits.

Initially, everything regarding Toy Story 2 was uncertain: whether stars Tom Hanks and Tim Allen would be available and affordable, what the story premise would be, and even whether the film would be computer-animated at Pixar or traditionally hand-drawn at Walt Disney Feature Animation. Lasseter regarded the project as a chance to groom new directing talent, as top choices were already immersed in other projects (Andrew Stanton as co-director of A Bug's Life and Pete Docter as director of what would eventually become Monsters, Inc.). Ash Brannon, a young animator who was previously animation director on Toy Story, was selected by Lasseter to direct after admiring his work on the first film. Brannon, a CalArts graduate, joined the Toy Story team in 1993. Disney and Pixar officially announced the sequel in a press release on March 12, 1997.

=== Story ===
"The story of Toy Story 2 is based a lot on my own experience. I'm a big toy collector and a lot of them are like antiques, or one-of-a-kind toys, or prototypes the toy makers have given me. Well, I have five sons, four of them are little and they love to come to daddy's work, and they come into daddy's office and they just play with everything. And I'm sitting there [saying] 'Oh no, that's uh, you can't play with that one, oh no, play with this one, oh no....' and I found myself just sitting there looking at myself and laughing. Because toys are manufactured, put on this Earth, to be played with by a child. That is the core essence of Toy Story. And so I started wondering, what was it like from a toy's point of view to be collected?"

— John Lasseter, on the story of Toy Story 2

Lasseter's intention with a sequel was to respect the original Toy Story film and create that world again. The story originated with him wondering what a toy would find upsetting, how a toy would feel if it were not played with by a child or, worse, a child growing out of a toy. Brannon suggested the idea of a yard sale where the collector recognizes Woody as a rare artifact. The concept of Woody as a collectible set came from the draft story of A Tin Toy Christmas, an original half-hour special pitched by Pixar to Disney in 1990. The obsessive toy collector named Al McWhiggin, who had appeared in a draft of Toy Story but was later expunged, was inserted into the film. Lasseter claimed that Al was inspired by himself.

Secondary characters in Woody's set were inspired by 1940s–1950s Western and puppet shows for children, such as Four Feather Falls, Hopalong Cassidy and Howdy Doody. The development of Jessie was kindled by Lasseter's wife Nancy, who pressed him to include a strong female character in the sequel with more substance than Bo Peep. The scope for the original Toy Story was basic and only extended over two residential homes, roadways, and a chain restaurant, whereas Toy Story 2 has been described by Unkrich as something "all over the map".

To ensure that the project was ready for theaters, Lasseter had to add around 12 minutes of material and strengthen what was already there. The extra material would be a challenge, as it could not be mere padding; it would have to feel as if it had always been there, an organic part of the film. With the scheduled delivery date less than a year away, Lasseter called Stanton, Docter, Joe Ranft, and some Disney story people to his house for a weekend. There, he hosted what he called a "story summit", a crash exercise that would produce a finished story in just two days.

Back at the office that Monday, Lasseter assembled the company in a screening room and pitched the revised version of Toy Story 2 from exposition to resolution. Story elements were recycled from the original drafts of the first Toy Story film. The first film's original opening sequence featured a Buzz Lightyear cartoon playing on television, which evolved into the Buzz Lightyear video game that would be shown in the opening scene of Toy Story 2. A deleted scene from Toy Story, featuring Woody having a nightmare involving him being thrown into a trash can, was incorporated in a milder form for depicting Woody's fear of losing Andy. The idea of a squeak-toy penguin with a broken squeaker also resurfaced from an early version of Toy Story.

=== Animation ===
As the story approached the production stage in early 1997, it was unclear whether Pixar would produce the film, as the entire team of 300 was busy working on A Bug's Life for a 1998 release. The Interactive Products Group, with a staff of 95, had its own animators, art department, and engineers. Under intense time pressure, they had put out two successful CD-ROM titles the previous year—Disney's Animated Storybook: Toy Story and The Toy Story Activity Center. Between the two products, the group had created as much original animation as there was in Toy Story itself. Steve Jobs decided to shut down the computer games operation, and the staff became the initial core of the Toy Story 2 production team.

Before the switch from direct-to-video to feature film, the Toy Story 2 crew had been on its own, placed in a new building that was well-separated from the rest of the company by railroad tracks. "We were just the small film and we were off playing in our sandbox," co-producer Karen Jackson said. Lasseter looked closely at every shot that had already been animated and called for tweaks throughout. The film reused digital elements from Toy Story but, true to the company's "prevailing culture of perfectionism, [...] it reused less of Toy Story than might be expected". Character models received major upgrades internally and shaders went through revisions to bring about subtle improvements. The team freely borrowed models from other productions, such as Geri from Pixar's 1997 short Geri's Game, who became the Cleaner in Toy Story 2. Supervising animator Glenn McQueen inspired the animators to do spectacular work in the short amount of time given, assigning different shots to suit each animators' strengths.

While producing Toy Story, the crew was careful in creating new locations, working within the available technology of the time. By the time of production on Toy Story 2, technology had advanced to the point of allowing more complicated camera shots than were possible in the first film. In making the sequel, the team at Pixar did not want to stray too far from the first film's look, but the company had developed new software since the first feature's completion. To achieve the dust visible after Woody is placed on top of a shelf, the crew was faced with the challenge of animating dust—an arduous task. After much experimentation, a tiny particle of dust was animated and the computer distributed that image throughout the entire shelf. Over two million dust particles are in place on the shelf in the completed film.

=== Troubled production ===
"When we went from a direct-to-video to a feature film and we had limited time in which to finish that feature film, the pressure really amped up. Forget seeing your family, forget doing anything. Once we made that decision [on the schedule], it was like, 'Okay, you have a release date. You're going to make that release date. You're going to make these screenings.'"

— Karen Jackson, co-producer of Toy Story 2.

Disney became unhappy with the pace of work on the film and demanded in June 1997 that Guggenheim be replaced as producer; Pixar complied, resulting in associate producers Karen Jackson and Helene Plotkin being promoted to co-producers.

In November 1997, Roth and Peter Schneider, the head of Walt Disney Feature Animation, viewed the film's story reels, featuring some finished animation, in a screening room at Pixar. They were impressed with the quality of work and became interested in releasing Toy Story 2 in theaters. In addition to the unexpected artistic caliber, there were other reasons that made the case for a theatrical release more compelling. The economics of a direct-to-video Pixar release were lackluster due to the higher salaries of the crew. After negotiations, Jobs and Roth agreed that the split of costs and profits for Toy Story 2 would follow the model of a newly created five-film deal, but Toy Story 2 would not count as one of the five films. Disney had bargained in the contract for five original features, not sequels, thus assuring five sets of new characters for its theme parks and merchandise. Jobs gathered the crew and announced the change in plans for the film on February 5, 1998.

The work done on the film to date was nearly lost in 1998 when one of the animators, while routinely clearing some files, accidentally entered the deletion command code /bin/rm -r -f * on the root folder of the Toy Story 2 assets on Pixar's internal servers. Associate technical director Oren Jacob was one of the first to notice as character models disappeared from their works in progress. They shut down the file servers, but had already lost 90% of the work from the last two years. Additionally, it was discovered that the backups had not been functioning for approximately a month. The film was saved when technical director Galyn Susman, who had been working remotely to care for her newborn child, revealed that she had a backup copy of the film on her home computer. The Pixar team was able to recover nearly all of the lost assets save for a few recent days of work, allowing the film to proceed.

Many of the creative staff at Pixar were unhappy with how the sequel was progressing. Upon returning from the European promotional tour of A Bug's Life, Lasseter watched the development reels and agreed that it was not working. Pixar met with Disney, informing them that the film would need to be reworked. Disney disagreed, and noted that Pixar did not have enough time to remake the film before its established release date. Pixar decided that they simply could not allow the film to be released in its existing state and asked Lasseter to take over the production. Lasseter agreed, recruiting the first film's creative team, including Stanton and Docter, to redevelop the story and taking over as director from Brannon, who would remain on the project as co-director alongside Lee Unkrich, who was also fresh from A Bug's Life, having served as supervising editor. To meet Disney's deadline, Pixar had to complete the entire film in nine months. Unkrich, concerned with the dwindling amount of time remaining, asked Jobs whether the release date could be pushed back. Jobs explained that there was no choice, presumably in reference to the film's licensees and marketing partners, who were getting toys and promotions ready.

Brannon focused on development, story, and animation; Lasseter was in charge of art, modeling, and lighting; Unkrich oversaw editorial, cinematography, and layout. The three met daily to discuss their progress with each other, as they wanted to ensure they were progressing in the same direction, which caused the boundaries of their responsibilities to overlap. As was common with Pixar features, the production became difficult as delivery dates loomed and hours inevitably became longer. Still, Toy Story 2, with its highly compressed production schedule, was especially trying. While hard work and long hours were common to the team by that point—especially so to Lasseter—running flat-out on Toy Story 2 for month after month began to take a toll. The overwork spun out into carpal tunnel syndrome for some animators, and repetitive strain injuries (RSI) for others. Catmull would later disclose that "a full third of the staff" ended up with some form of RSI by the time the film was finished. Pixar did not encourage long hours, and, in fact, set limits on how many hours employees could work by approving or disapproving overtime. Employees' self-imposed compulsions to excel often trumped any other constraints, and were especially common among younger employees. In one instance, an animator had forgotten to drop his child off at daycare one morning and, in a mental haze, forgot the baby in the back seat of his car in the parking lot. "Although quick action by rescue workers headed off the worst, the incident became a horrible indicator that some on the crew were working too hard," wrote David Price in his 2008 book The Pixar Touch.

== Music ==
Randy Newman, who composed and conducted music for the original Toy Story film, returned to score the sequel. He wrote two original songs—"When She Loved Me", performed by Sarah McLachlan, and "Woody's Roundup", performed by Riders in the Sky—besides composing the score. The song from Toy Story, "You've Got a Friend in Me" was also reused. It was sung at two different points during the film by Tom Hanks as Woody and Robert Goulet, the singing voice of Wheezy. The score released by Walt Disney Records on November 9, 1999. The track "When She Loved Me", which was considered to be among the saddest sequences in both Disney and Pixar films, and the saddest film songs ever written, received acclaim for McLachlan's singing and Newman's compositions. The song was nominated at the Academy Awards in 2000 for Best Original Song, though the award went to Phil Collins for "You'll Be in My Heart" from another Disney animated film, Tarzan.

== Release ==
=== Theatrical ===
Pixar showed the completed film at CalArts on November 12, 1999, in recognition of the school's ties with Lasseter and more than 40 other alumni who worked on the film. The students were captivated. The film held its official premiere the next day at the El Capitan Theatre in Los Angeles—the same venue as Toy Story—and was released across the United States on November 24, 1999. Debuting alongside End of Days, it was released in 3,236 locations, the third-highest number of theaters of any film, after Wild Wild West and Austin Powers: The Spy Who Shagged Me, as well as the widest November release. The film's initial theatrical and video releases include Luxo Jr., Pixar's first short film released in 1986, starring Pixar's titular mascot. Before Luxo Jr., a disclaimer appears reading: "In 1986 Pixar Animation Studios produced their first film. This is why we have a hopping lamp in our logo". On December 25, 1999, within a month of the film's theatrical release, a blooper reel was added to the film's mid-credits, which features the characters, Flik (Dave Foley) and Heimlich (Joe Ranft), from A Bug's Life.

=== Re-releases ===
In 2009, both Toy Story and Toy Story 2 were converted to 3D for a two-week limited theatrical re-release, which was extended due to its success. Lasseter said, "The Toy Story films and characters will always hold a very special place in our hearts and we're so excited to be bringing this landmark film back for audiences to enjoy in a whole new way, thanks to the latest in 3-D technology. With Toy Story 3 shaping up to be another great adventure for Buzz, Woody and the gang from Andy's room, we thought it would be great to let audiences experience the first two films all over again and in a brand new way".

Adapting the films into 3D involved revisiting the original computer data and virtually placing a second camera into each scene, creating left-eye and right-eye views needed to achieve stereopsis from binocular disparity. Unique to computer animation, Lasseter referred to this process as "digital archaeology". The lead stereographer Bob Whitehill oversaw this process and sought to achieve an effect that impacted the film's emotional storytelling. It took four months to resurrect the old data and get it in working order. Then, adapting each of the films to 3D took six months per film.

The double feature opened in 1,745 theaters on October 2, 2009, and made $12.5 million in its opening weekend, finishing in third place at the box office behind Zombieland and Cloudy with a Chance of Meatballs. The features closed on November 5, 2009, with a worldwide gross of $32.3 million. Unlike other countries, the UK and Argentina received the films in 3D as separate releases. Toy Story 2 was released January 22, 2010, in the UK, and February 18, 2010, in Argentina.

=== Home media ===
Toy Story 2 was released on both VHS and DVD and as a DVD two-pack with Toy Story on October 17, 2000. That same day, an "Ultimate Toy Box" set was released containing the first and second films and a third disc of bonus materials. All three releases are THX certified and feature a sneak peek of Monsters, Inc., the Luxo Jr. short film and outtakes. The standard DVD release allowed the viewer to select the version of the film either in widescreen (1.77:1 aspect ratio) or fullscreen (1.33:1 aspect ratio). The standard VHS, DVD, DVD two-pack, and the "Ultimate Toy Box" sets returned to the vault on May 1, 2003. It was re-released as a Special Edition 2-disc DVD on December 26, 2005. Both editions returned to the Disney Vault on January 31, 2009.

In 2000, it was found that around 1,000 copies of the Ultimate Toy Box that were shipped to Costco stores had a pressing error which caused a scene from the 2000 R-rated film High Fidelity to play in the middle of the film. The scene in question, which featured the use of the word "fuck" multiple times, prompted a number of complaints from consumers, causing Costco to eventually recall the defective units from shelves and replace them. The defect was caused by a "content mix" error according to Technicolor, which manufactured the discs, and only affected the Ultimate Toy Box. Box set copies of Toy Story 2 which were included with the two-pack were not affected by the manufacturing error. According to Buena Vista Home Entertainment, less than 1% of the discs shipped were printed with the glitch.

Toy Story 2 was available for the first time on Blu-ray Disc in a Special Edition Combo Pack released on March 23, 2010, along with the first film. On November 1, 2011, the first three Toy Story films were re-released, each as a DVD/Blu-ray/Blu-ray 3D/Digital Copy combo pack (four discs each for the first two films, and five for the third film). The film was released on Ultra HD Blu-ray on June 4, 2019.

== Deleted outtake ==
For the 2019 home media, the Disney+ reissue, and the 2024 UK theatrical cinema re-release at Vue Cinemas, Disney removed a scene from the film's mid-credit outtakes that featured Stinky Pete flirting with a pair of Barbie dolls and discussing a role in Toy Story 3. Media outlets inferred the outtake to be a reference to the casting couch practice and attributed the change to being a result of the MeToo movement, as director John Lasseter stepped down from Pixar the previous year following allegations of sexual misconduct towards employees at the studio. Kelsey Grammer, voice of Stinky Pete, later explained his and Lasseter's intention behind the outtake, that being "[...] the Barbies might be in his trailer, talking about how he'd like to get them some work, but he's actually trying to hit on them." When told Disney was removing it due to the MeToo movement, he asked, "But why? Because, what, they're guilty of it?", then added in an interview, "But they cut it out anyway. It was fairly harmless. It just was, 'Oh, yeah, that never happened in Hollywood'...Well, all right..."

== Reception ==
=== Box office ===
Toy Story 2 was as successful as the first Toy Story film commercially. It became 1999's highest-grossing animated film, earning $245.9 million in the United States and Canada and $511.3 million worldwide—beating both Pixar's previous releases by a significant margin. It became the third-highest-grossing animated film of all time (behind The Lion King and Aladdin).

Toy Story 2 opened over the Thanksgiving Day weekend at No. 1 ahead of The World Is Not Enough, End of Days and Sleepy Hollow, collecting a three-day tally of $57.4 million from 3,236 theaters, averaging $17,734 per theater over three days, as well as making $80.1 million since its Wednesday launch and staying at the top for the next two weekends. At the time of the film's release, it had the third-highest opening weekend of all time, behind The Lost World: Jurassic Park and Star Wars: Episode I – The Phantom Menace. It achieved the largest opening weekend for an animated film, a record held until Monsters, Inc. surpassed it in 2001. The film earned $9.5 million during its first day, breaking Back to the Future Part II's record to have the highest Thanksgiving opening day. On its third day of release, it made $22.6 million, surpassing The Waterboy to have Disney's best single-day gross. This also made it the highest Friday gross at that time, beating The Lost World: Jurassic Park. For two years, the film would hold that record until May 2001 when The Mummy Returns opened with $23.4 million. Moreover, Toy Story 2 was ranked as the third-highest five-day Wednesday opening gross of any film, trailing only behind The Phantom Menace and Independence Day. The film even had the highest five-day Thanksgiving opening weekend, beating out A Bug's Life. In 2013, The Hunger Games: Catching Fire and Frozen both surpassed Toy Story 2 to have the largest Thanksgiving weekend debut. For its second weekend, the film had earned $27.7 million, making it the fourth-highest December weekend gross, after Scream 2's opening weekend gross and Titanic's opening weekend and second weekend grosses respectively. By New Year's Day, it had made more than $200 million in the U.S. alone, and it eventually became 1999's third highest-grossing film after The Phantom Menace and The Sixth Sense, while also far surpassing the original. Box Office Mojo estimates that the film sold over 47.8 million tickets in the United States and Canada.

The film set a three-day weekend record in the United Kingdom, grossing £7.7 million and beating The Phantom Menace. In 2001, that record would be surpassed by Harry Potter and the Philosopher's Stone. Upon opening, the film reached the top of the box office, beating out The Beach, American Beauty and The End of the Affair. It spent seven weeks there at number one. In Japan, Toy Story 2 earned $3.8 million in its opening weekend to not only become the country's highest-grossing American animated film, but also the second largest opening weekend in the territory, behind Armageddon. Around this time, the film surpassed Twister to become the seventeenth-highest domestic grosser. Following in biggest grosses are Italy ($6.9 million), France and the Maghreb region ($24.7 million), Germany ($12.9 million), and Spain ($11.7 million).

=== Critical response ===
Critics raved about Toy Story 2 upon release. Reviewers judged Toy Story 2 as a sequel that equaled or even surpassed the original in terms of quality. The Hollywood Reporter proclaimed:

Toy Story 2 does what few sequels ever do. Instead of essentially remaking an earlier film and deeming it a sequel, the creative team, led by director John Lasseter, delves deeper into their characters while retaining the fun spirit of the original film.

On review aggregation website Rotten Tomatoes, the film has an approval rating of 100% based on 171 reviews, with an average rating of 9.2/10. The site's critical consensus reads, "The rare sequel that arguably improves on its predecessor, Toy Story 2 uses inventive storytelling, gorgeous animation, and a talented cast to deliver another rich moviegoing experience for all ages." As of March 2024, it is the highest rated animated film on the site and the second-most reviewed film at 100% overall, after Leave No Trace. On Metacritic, the film has a score of 88 out of 100, based on 34 critics, indicating "universal acclaim". CinemaScore reported that audiences had given the film a rare grade of "A+" on an A+ to F scale, making it both the highest grade in the series to date and the first ever computer-animated film to receive such a grade.

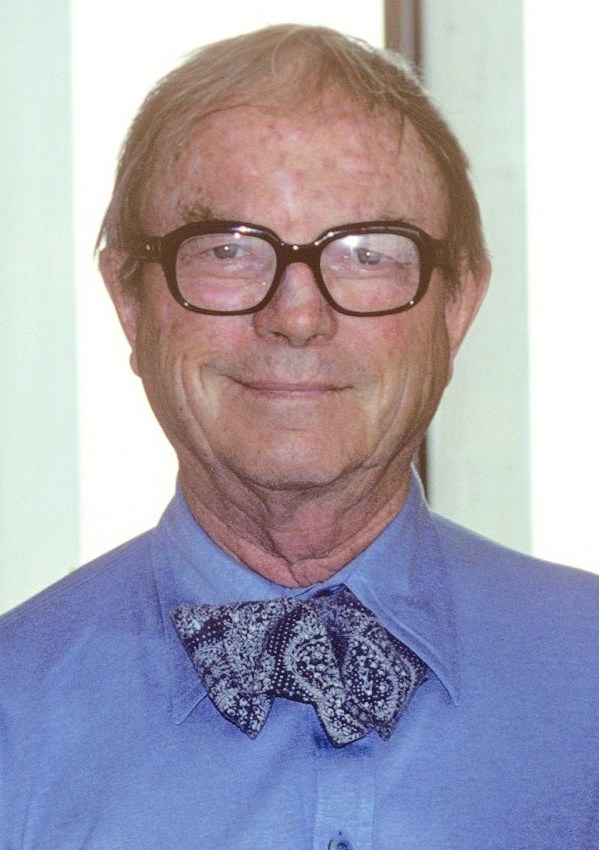
Animator Chuck Jones wrote a letter to Lasseter after seeing the film, heavily praising it.

Roger Ebert of the Chicago Sun-Times gave the film three and a half stars out of four and said in his print review, "I forgot something about toys a long time ago, and Toy Story 2 reminded me". Kenneth Turan of the Los Angeles Times said, "Toy Story 2 may not have the most original title, but everything else about it is, well, mint in the box". Todd McCarthy of Variety said, "In the realm of sequels, Toy Story 2 is to Toy Story what The Empire Strikes Back was to its predecessor, a richer, more satisfying film in every respect". Lisa Schwarzbaum of Entertainment Weekly said, "It's a great, IQ-flattering entertainment both wonderful and wise".

Upon seeing the film, animator Chuck Jones (director of the Looney Tunes shorts) wrote a letter to Lasseter, calling the film "wonderful" and "beautifully animated", and telling Lasseter he was "advancing the cause of classic animation in a new and effective way." Lasseter, a personal admirer of Jones, has the letter framed in his house.

=== Accolades ===
Toy Story 2 received several recognitions, including seven Annie Awards, but none of them were previous nominations. The first went to Pixar for Outstanding Achievement in an Animated Theatrical Feature. The Outstanding Individual Achievement for Directing in an Animated Feature Production award was given to John Lasseter, Lee Unkrich and Ash Brannon. Randy Newman won an Annie Award for Outstanding Individual Achievement for Music in an Animated Feature Production. Joan Cusack won the Outstanding Individual Achievement for Voice Acting by a Female Performer in an Animated Feature Production, while Tim Allen won for Outstanding Individual Achievement for Voice Acting by a Male Performer in an animated feature Production. The last Annie was received by John Lasseter, Pete Docter, Ash Brannon, Andrew Stanton, Rita Hsiao, Doug Chamberlin and Chris Webb for Outstanding Individual Achievement for Writing in an Animated Feature Production.

The film itself also won many awards, including the Blockbuster Entertainment Award for Favorite Family Film (Internet Only), the Critics Choice Award for Best Animated Film, the Bogey Award, and a Golden Globe Award for Best Motion Picture – Musical or Comedy. Along with his other awards, Randy Newman and his song "When She Loved Me" won a Grammy Award for Best Song Written for a Motion Picture, Television or Other Visual Media. A Satellite Award was given for Outstanding Youth DVD, and a Golden Satellite Award for Best Motion Picture, Animated or Mixed Media, and one for Best Original Song "When She Loved Me".

Awards
Year	Award	Category	Recipients	Result
2000	ASCAP Film and Television Music Awards	Top Box Office Films of 2000 Award	Randy Newman	Won
2000	Academy Awards	Best Original Song	Randy Newman (for "When She Loved Me")	Nominated
2000	Saturn Awards	Best Fantasy Film		Nominated
2000	Saturn Awards	Best Music	Randy Newman	Nominated
2000	Annie Awards	Animated Theatrical Feature	Helene Plotkin & Karen Robert Jackson	Won
2000	Annie Awards	Outstanding Individual Achievement for Character Animation	Doug Sweetland	Nominated
2000	Annie Awards	Outstanding Individual Achievement for Directing in an Animated Feature Production	John Lasseter, Lee Unkrich & Ash Brannon	Won
2000	Annie Awards	Outstanding Individual Achievement for Music in an Animated Feature Production	Randy Newman	Won
2000	Annie Awards	Outstanding Individual Achievement for Production Design in an Animated Feature Production	William Cone & Jim Pearson	Nominated
2000	Annie Awards	Outstanding Individual Achievement for Storyboarding in an Animated Feature Production	Dan Jeup & Joe Ranft	Won
2000	Annie Awards	Outstanding Individual Achievement for Voice Acting by a Female Performer in an Animated Feature Production	Joan Cusack	Won
2000	Annie Awards	Outstanding Individual Achievement for Voice Acting by a Male Performer in an Animated Feature Production	Tim Allen	Won
2000	Annie Awards	Outstanding Individual Achievement for Writing in an Animated Feature Production	John Lasseter, Pete Docter, Ash Brannon, Andrew Stanton, Rita Hsiao, Doug Chamberlin & Chris Webb	Won
2000	Blockbuster Entertainment Awards	Best Family Film (Internet Only)		Won
2000	Bogey Awards	Bogey Award		Won
2000	Broadcast Film Critics Association Awards	Best Animated Film	John Lasseter, Lee Unkrich and Ash Brannon	Won
2000	Casting Society of America	Best Casting for Animated Voiceover – Feature Film	Ruth Lambert	Nominated
2000	Golden Globe Awards	Best Picture – Musical or Comedy		Won
2000	Golden Globe Awards	Best Original Song	Randy Newman (for "When She Loved Me")	Nominated
2000	Kids' Choice Awards	Favorite Movie		Nominated
2000	Kids' Choice Awards	Favorite Voice from an Animated Movie	Tim Allen	Nominated
2000	Kids' Choice Awards	Favorite Voice from an Animated Movie	Tom Hanks	Nominated
2000	MTV Movie Awards	Best On-Screen Duo	Tim Allen & Tom Hanks	Nominated
2000	Motion Picture Sound Editors	Best Sound Editing – Animated Feature	Gary Rydstrom, Tom Myers, Michael Silvers, Mary Helen Leasman, Shannon Mills, Teresa Eckton, Susan Sanford, Bruce Lacey & Jonathan Null	Nominated
2000	Motion Picture Sound Editors	Best Sound Editing, Music – Animation	Bruno Coon & Lisa Jaime	Nominated
2000	Online Film Critics Society	Best Film		Nominated
2000	Online Film Critics Society	Best Original Screenplay	Andrew Stanton, Rita Hsiao, Doug Chamberlin & Chris Webb	Nominated
2000	Satellite Awards	Best Motion Picture, Animated or Mixed Media		Nominated
2000	Satellite Awards	Best Original Song	Sarah McLachlan (for "When She Loved Me")	Nominated
2000	Young Artist Awards	Best Family Feature Film – Animated		Won
2001	Grammy Awards	Best Song Written for a Motion Picture, Television or Other Visual Media	Randy Newman (for "When She Loved Me")	Won
2001	Grammy Awards	Best Score Soundtrack Album for a Motion Picture, Television or Other Visual Media	Randy Newman	Nominated
2001	Grammy Awards	Best Country Performance by a Duo or Group with Vocal	Riders in the Sky (for "Woody's Roundup")	Nominated
2005	Satellite Awards	Outstanding Youth DVD (2-Disc Special Edition)		Won

The film is recognized by American Film Institute in these lists:

- 2003: AFI's 100 Years...100 Heroes & Villains:
  - Buzz Lightyear – Nominated Hero
- 2004: AFI's 100 Years...100 Songs:
  - "When She Loved Me" – Nominated
- 2008: AFI's 10 Top 10:
  - Nominated Animated Film

== Video games ==
Toy Story 2: Buzz Lightyear to the Rescue, a video game for personal computers, PlayStation, Nintendo 64, and Dreamcast, was released in November 1999. Another game, titled Toy Story 2, was developed by Tiertex Design Studios and released for the Game Boy Color in November 1999.

== Sequel ==
The sequel, titled Toy Story 3, was released on June 18, 2010. In the film, Andy's toys are accidentally donated to a day-care center as he prepares to leave for college.

== Bibliography ==
- Nelson, Andrew Patrick (2015). Still in the Saddle: The Hollywood Western, 1969–1980. Norman: University of Oklahoma Press. ISBN 978-0-8061-5303-2.
- Price, David (2008). The Pixar Touch. New York: Alfred A. Knopf. ISBN 978-0-307-26575-3.
