= Raumbild-Verlag =

Mid-20th-century stereoscopic photograph publisher

Raumbild-Verlag ("Raumbild") was a German publishing outfit which focused exclusively on stereoscopic imagery, usually accompanied by expository text. Founded in Dießen in the 1930s by Otto Wilhelm Schönstein (1891–1958), Raumbild produced 6x13cm photographic stereo pairs designed to be used with the proprietary fold-out "Photoplastikon" viewer produced for the company, some of which featured Zeiss Jena lenses. Quickly aligning itself with the propaganda arm of the NSDAP, Raumbild moved around several times before settling in Munich in 1939. After the defeat of Germany in the Second World War, Raumbild changed directions in terms of content, while still focusing on subjects relevant to German identity. In 1996, the German Historical Museum obtained the remaining archives of Raumbild, which are now available to researchers.

== Founder ==
Otto Wilhelm Schönstein was born in Nürnberg in 1891, and in his early life became a textile merchant. He was fascinated by stereoscopic photography, and in his early 40s he decided to transition from hobbyist into professional purveyor of stereoscopic images. After the Second World War, Schönstein was tried and released for his complicity in Nazi propaganda; he lived in relative obscurity, publishing new 6x13cm stereoview sets under pseudonyms until his death in 1958.

== Establishment, early efforts, and association with Nazism ==
Schönstein incorporated Raumbild on 14 January 1935. Although his first publishing efforts were failures due to negative reviews from Reichsstelle zur Forderung des deutschen Schrifttums, his later work with Raumbild throughout the mid-1930s and through the mid-1940s was very popular in Germany. The country was swept up in nationalistic fervor; Schönstein would capitalize on this in his works after changing his focus from travel photography to Germanic subjects. He quickly came to the attention of the Nazi Party, and his company became a de facto photographic arm of the Propaganda Ministry of the Party. This association led to unprecedented access for Schönstein and his employees and collaborators, beginning with the 1936 Summer Olympics in which he collaborated with Leni Riefenstahl. The resulting book & stereograph collection, Die Olympischen Spiele, was a commercial success, at which point Heinrich Hoffmann, Adolf Hitler's personal photographer, became a silent partner with a 50% stake in Raumbild for a 5,000 RM initial investment and a 10,000 RM loan. Hoffmann became the official photographer, while Schönstein – regarded as an inferior lensman – curated and produced the various sets released by the company. This partnership cemented a longstanding relationship between Raumbild and the Third Reich which lasted until the end of the Second World War, although production of new materials ceased in 1942 as the war efforts made continuing photography difficult.

== Postwar activities ==
After the war, Raumbild stopped producing materials related to the NSDAP. During denazification, which continued until 1953, Schönstein continued to create photographs and photographic sets; after a 6-month probationary period in 1946 related to his collusion with the Third Reich, Raumbild resumed production. Schönstein produced sets with the intention of selling to American occupying forces; this provided the bulk of his income for the remainder of his life. In 1951, most of Schönstein's assets were seized as a judgement against his actions during the War; nevertheless, he would produce one of his final major works through Raumbild, covering the 1952 Olympics. During this period, Raumbild was primarily publishing the works of other photographers, primarily in color, and the subject matter ranged from landscapes to architecture to nudes. In early 1958, Raumbild was declared defunct, and Schönstein would have to sell; the company passed to Siegfried Brandmüller, a former employee of Schönstein's who would run the company for the next 27 years. The 23-year-old Brandmüller kept Schönstein on as an employee, which greatly embarrassed the former Raumbild giant; he would die just six months later. After a few initial successes by Brandmüller, Raumbild went dormant for a long time, although a number of attempts were made to re-launch the company; all of these failed. Raumbild folded for good in the mid-1980s. The Raumbild archives (outside of those seized by the American government and now in the public domain) changed hands a number of times and are now owned by the German Historical Museum.

== Publications ==
It is difficult to produce a definitive list of Raumbild's output, as some works were produced in extremely small editions, and numerous smaller manufacturers attached the Raumbild name to unauthorized sets not actually affiliated with the company. Below is a partial list of known works produced by Raumbild-Verlag. Because Raumbild views are designed for a specific type of viewer, they cannot be directly transposed into anaglyphs; some cropping is required.

=== Early works ===
- 1935, Venedig, ein Raumerlebnis ("Venice, a space experience"), a travel series on Venice, which was rejected by the NSDAP Propaganda Ministry Photographers: Schönstein, Kurt Lothar Tank
- 1935, Unnamed series on Rome and the Vatican, never completed

=== Nazi propaganda ===
- 1936, Die Olympischen Spiele ("The Olympic Games"), a 100-card set & book featuring the 1936 Summer Olympics in Berlin, as well as the Winter Olympics and Chess Olympiad. Photographers: Schönstein, Heinrich Hoffmann
- 1936, Münchner Karneval ("Munich Carnival"), a 10-card set. Photographer: Schönstein
- 1936, Reichsparteitag der Ehre ("Reich Party of Honor"), a 100-card set & book focused on the 1936 Nuremberg Rally. Photographer: Hoffmann
- 1937, Tag der Deutschen Kunst ("Day of German Art"), a 100-card set & book showcasing German works of art. Photographer: Hoffmann
- 1937, Die Weltausstellung Paris 1937 ("The World's Fair Paris 1937"), a 100-card set & book featuring the 1937 World's Fair. Photographer: Hoffmann
- 1937, Reichsparteitag der Arbeit ("Reich Party of Labor"), a 100-card set & book featuring the 1937 Nuremberg Rally. Photographer: Hoffmann
- 1938, Deutsche Gaue ("German Authority"), a 100-card set & book focused on German identity, primarily with patriotic German scenic and architectural images. Photographer: Hoffmann
- 1938, HITLER / MUSSOLINI: der Staatsbesuch des Führers in Italien ("The State Visit of the Leader in Italy"), a 100-card set & book about Adolf Hitler's official visit to Mussolini's Italy. Photographer: Hoffmann
- 1939, Großdeutschlands Wiedergeburt – Weltgeschichtliche Stunden an der Donau ("Greater Germany Rebirth – World Historical Hours on the Danube"), a 120-card set & book commemorating the reunification of Germany and Austria. Photographer: Hoffmann
- 1938, Parteitag Großdeutschland ("Party Congress Greater Germany"), a 100-card set & book centered around the 1938 Nuremberg Rally. Photographer: Hoffmann
- 1939, Der Traditionsgau München-Oberbayern ("The Traditional Munich & Upper Bavaria"), a very limited 100-card set & book focusing on the seat of power for the Third Reich, given to elite Party members. Photographer: Hoffmann
- 1939, Der Erste Großdeutsche Reichskriegertag ("The First Greater-German State War Veteran's Day"), a 100-card set & book featuring a military celebration in Kassel. Photographer: Hoffmann
- 1939, Die Soldaten des Führers im Felde – Der Feldzug in Polen 1939 ("The Soldiers of the Führer in the Field – The Campaign in Poland 1939"), a 100-card set & book focused on the Wehrmacht invasion of Poland. Photographers: Hoffmann and Hugo Jäger
- 1940, Der Kampf im Westen ("The Struggle in the West"), a 100-card set & book featuring battle photography after the capture of Poland. Photographers: unknown (various) There is a rare, late-1944 version of this publication in existence, which removed a photograph of Erwin von Witzleben after the failed 20 July plot.
- 1942, Die Kriegsmarine ("The Wartime Navy"), a 100-card set & book that covers German naval prowess before and during the War. Photographers: unknown (various)
- 1942, Fliegen und Siegen ("Flying and Victory"), a 100-card set & book that covers the German Luftwaffe before and during the War. Photographers: unknown (various)

=== Postwar productions ===
- 1949, Martin's Kunstmappen ("Martin's Art folders"), Series I: Outdoor Nudes (20-card set), series II: Indoor Nudes (20-card set). Photographer: Hans S. Martin
- 1952, Deutsche Fußball-Olympiamannschaft im Wettstreit der Nationen ("German Olympic football team in the competition of nations"), a 50-card set featuring the German football team at the 1952 Olympic Games. Photographer: Schönstein.
- 1952, Stadt und Landschaft der US-Zone. ("U.S. Occupied Zone of Germany"), 120-card set & book featuring Germany during denazification. Photographer: unknown
- 1959, Grock lacht über Gracht. 30 card boxed set featuring famed Swiss clown Grock. Photographer: Kurt Gelsner.
