= Maria Almas-Dietrich =

German art dealer

Maria Almas-Dietrich, nee Dietrich (born 27 June 1892 in Munich; died 11 November 1971 in Dachau) was one of Hitler's most important art suppliers for his planned Führermuseum which was to be built in Hitler's hometown of Linz, Austria.

== Life ==
The daughter of a butcher from Munich's West end, Maria Dietrich became a force in the French art market thanks to her connection to German Führer Adolf Hitler. In 1920 she gave birth to an illegitimate child. In 1921 she married Ali Almàs, a Turkish journalist of Jewish origin born in Izmir on 1 May 1883, who also wrote under the name “Diamant”.

Dietrich owned Galerie Almas in Munich located on Ottostrasse 9 next to the Swiss and American embassies, the gallery mainly dealt in antiques and paintings from the 15th to 19th centuries. She divorced Almas in 1937, but kept the name for the gallery.

On 15 January 1940 she became a naturalized citizen of the German Reich after swearing that she was not of Jewish ancestry.

== Art dealer for Hitler ==
Dietrich was introduced to Adolf Hitler through his photographer Heinrich Hoffmann, and Hitler eventually authorized her to purchase works of art for him without asking permission first. Between 1936 and 1944 Dietrich acquired more than one thousand pieces of art for Hitler and his planned Führermuseum, making her one of the most important dealers in Nazi Germany. Much of the art she acquired had been stolen from the private collections of displaced, deported or executed Jewish citizens.

== Arrest and interrogation ==
In autumn 1945 Almas-Dietrich was arrested and interrogated by the OSS Art Looting Intelligence Unit (ALIU). A special interrogation report about her was drafted. However, it was not published. She was mentioned 22 times in the ALIU Final Report on Nazi-looting of art which noted "Dietrich, Frau Maria Almas. Munich, Gustav Freytagstr 5. Art dealer; personal friend of Hitler, and for a time his principal buyer of works of art. One of the most important purchasing agents for Linz. Was under house arrest at Grafing, Bavaria, autumn 1945."

The Allies suspected that Almas-Dietrich '"like many other dealers" had stashed away quantities of Nazi-looted art. "Monuments Man" S. Lane Faison recommended that her licence be suspended.

== Postwar ==
After the war, Maria Almas Dietrich returned to Munich and lived in a neighborhood close to other dealers of Nazi-looted art. Despite her deep involvement in Nazi-looted art, she was not troubled by the German authorities. She even made claims for artworks that had been found by the Monuments Men. On 4 March 1949 she addressed claims to Occupation Costs Office because paintings by Grützner, Defregger, Horemans and Braith as well as “5 wooden sculptures of male saints” could no longer be found in the Collecting Point and were presumably stolen. She was one of the exhibitors at the Munich art and antiques fair co-founded by Otto Bernheimer.

Mimi tho Rahde continued the art business after the death of her mother.

== Nazi-looted art acquired via Dietrich ==
The number of Nazi-looted artworks acquired through Dietrich is so great that it requires databases to track them, including the Hitler's Linz Museum database, the Lostart database, the Central Collecting Point Database, the ERR database and others. Many of the artworks she acquired were destined for Hitler's personal collection or his museum in Linz. Others entered the private market for Nazi-looted art via dealers in Switzerland or other intermediaries. A few examples include:

- The oil painting Fiat Justitia by Carl Spitzweg came to Almas-Dietrich in 1938 from the Heinemann Gallery, under the Nazis. The work was not returned to the Heinemann family, but served from 10 June 1949 as a decoration in the office of the Federal President in Bonn for eight presidents. It ended up in the Berlin art depot of the Federal Office for Central Services and Unresolved Property Issues.
- The allegory of Hygieia by Ferdinand Georg Waldmüller came from the persecuted Hermann Eissler in Vienna to the Munich gallery “Almas”. "As early as June 1938, the Munich art dealer Maria Almas-Dietrich asked for permission to export the 4 pharmacy signs intended for the driver's cab in Munich."
- Chalk and pencil drawings by Adolph von Menzel came to Almas-Dietrich from the gallery of Anna Caspari. After the war, the sheets were distributed to various German museums. Moritz von Schwind's Nymphe Genoveva was procured inexpensively for the Führermuseum in 1940 from the property of the politically unpopular Richard von Kühlmann. In 1966 it was transferred to the von der Heydt Museum in Wuppertal.

=== Importance as an art looter ===
The Austrian Lexicon of Provenance Research places Almas-Dietrich among the top dealers in Nazi looted art under the Third Reich: "Alongside Karl Haberstock and Maria Almas-Dietrich, the art dealer Bruno Lohse was probably one of the most important art dealers in the service of the National Socialist government."

Recent historical research emphasizes Almas-Dietrich's connection to powerful Nazi art looters such as Bruno Lohse, describing her as part of the "solar system that included Nazi art traders such as Alois Miedl, Walter Andreas Hofer, Maria Almas Dietrich and Karl Haberstock."

== Literature ==
- Günther Haase: Kunstraub und Kunstschutz. Eine Dokumentation. Band 1: Kunstraub und Kunstschutz. 2. erweiterte Auflage. Books on Demand, Norderstedt 2008, ISBN 978-3-8334-8975-4, S. 133ff.
- Jonathan Petropoulos: The Faustian bargain. The art world in Nazi Germany. Oxford University Press, New York NY 2000, ISBN 0-19-512964-4
- Birgit Schwarz: Auf Befehl des Führers. Hitler und der NS-Kunstraub. Darmstadt 2014
- Lynn H Nicholas, Der Raub der Europa. Das Schicksal europäischer Kunstwerke im Dritten Reich, ISBN 9783426772607, München 1997
- Commission for Protection and Restitution of Cultural Material, London 1945, National Archives M1947, Art Dealers-Vaucher Commission Lists, 16 July 1945

== See also ==
- Führermuseum
- Hermann Voss (art historian)
- The Holocaust in France
- Nazi plunder
- List of claim for restitution for Nazi-looted art
- The Holocaust
- Heinrich Hoffmann
