= Kurt Schmid-Ehmen =

Nazi German sculptor (1901–1968)

Kurt Schmid-Ehmen (23 October 1901 – 14 July 1968) was a German sculptor.

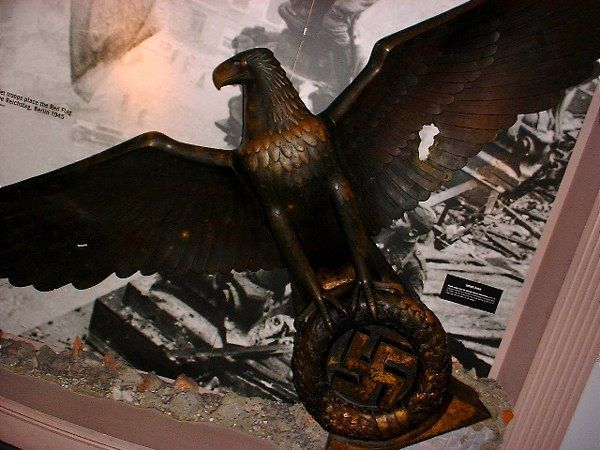
Schmid-Ehmen's bronze imperial eagle from the Reich Chancellery, today at the Imperial War Museum

Schmid-Ehmen is considered the creator of the imperial eagle and Nazi symbol of sovereignty. He studied at the Leipzig Academy with Adolf Lehnert and Munich Academy, was a master student of Bernhard Bleeker and first drew attention with numerous busts, including one of the famous pianist Josef Pembaur, the teacher of the concert pianist Hetty Haelssig. In January 1932, due to his acquaintance with the architect Paul Ludwig Troost he had his first commissions and the personal acquaintance with Adolf Hitler.

Notable sculptures were featured in the Feldherrnhalle, and also included the Eagles at the party buildings in Munich, on the Reich Party Congress site in Nuremberg and the Eagle relief for the smoking room in the New Reich Chancellery. Schmid-Ehmen also produced the largest bronze eagle with a height of nine meters for the German Pavilion at the 1937 World's Fair in Paris and received the Grand Prix de la République Française for it. Since 1936 he was a member of the Presidential Council of the Reich Chamber of Fine Arts, on 30. In January 1937, Adolf Hitler appointed him professor. Previously, he had already been appointed a member of the Reich Cultural Senate by Joseph Goebbels in 1935.

For the time of National Socialism, his participation in 19 major group exhibitions is certainly proven, including at the Great German Art Exhibition in Munich from 1937 to 1944. In 1937 he showed Portrait busts of the Nazi leader Adolf Wagner, Franz Xaver Schwarz and Julius Streicher. Hitler acquired the statue "Female Figure" exhibited in 1938, and in 1940 the statue "Streinder". In 1944, the bust of the Nazi writer Hans Zöberlein was exhibited by Schmid-Ehmen.

Following the end of World War II, Schmid-Ehmen was artistically active again at his new residence in Starnberg from 1948 and created portraits, tombstones and figurative works. His late works include a 1961 Mourning Fountain, a commissioned work for a retirement home in Schweinfurt, as well as a monumental phoenix with a wingspan of 3.50 m and a height of 2.10 m, which he completed as a cast-ready-made plaster model two months before his death in 1968. The bronze cast was done in 1990 under the supervision of his widow.

Schmid-Ehmen died 14 July 1968, aged 66.
