= Hans Schmidt-Leonhardt =

Nazi German lawyer (1886–1945)

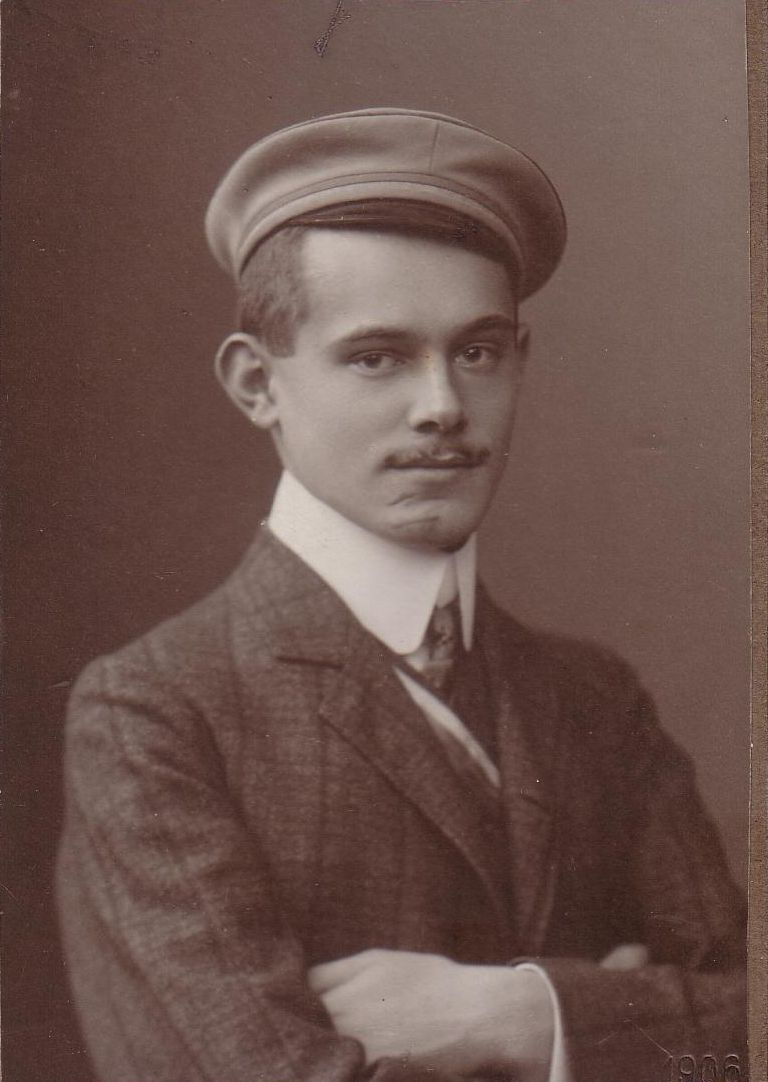
Schmidt-Leonhardt (1906)

Hans Schmidt-Leonhardt (6 August 1886 – April 1945 in Berlin) was a German administrative lawyer, ministerial official in the Reich Ministry for Popular Enlightenment and Propaganda and leading press lawyer of the Nazi state.

== Biography ==
Schmidt-Leonhardt was born 6 August 1886 in Leipzig. After graduating from the Thomasschule in Leipzig, he studied law at the University of Leipzig from 1905. He became a member of the Corpus Lusatia Leipzig in 1906 and headed the Kösener Congress in 1914. He passed the traineeship examination in 1909 and received his doctorate in Leipzig in 1910 to become a doctor.

After passing the assessor examination in 1913, he began his career in the internal administration of the Kingdom of Saxony in 1914. In 1920 he was appointed as a government councilor in the Ministry of Economic Affairs. His work The Second Proletariat, published in the same year, was briefly mentioned a year later in Paul Levi's writing Our Way. Schmidt-Leonhardt continued his career in 1924 in the Ministry of the Interior and in 1925 at the Saxon Association in Berlin. In 1926 he became a Senior Government Councillor in the Reich Ministry of the Interior.

In the Nazi state, he joined the Reich Ministry for Enlightenment and Propaganda in 1933 as a specialist in press law. He headed the legal department of the ministry as a ministerial councillor and was also one of the three managing directors of the Reichskulturkammer. In 1935 he was also appointed to the Reichskultursenat. On 1 May 1937 he joined the NSDAP (membership number 3,934,054).The Friedrich-Wilhelms-Universität Berlin appointed him honorary professor in 1938. In 1939 he became ministerial conductor.

He shot himself during the Battle of Berlin in April 1945.
