= Stereographer =

A stereographer is a professional in the field of stereoscopy and visual effects using the art and techniques of stereo photography, 3D photography, or stereoscopic 3D film to create a visual perception of a 3-dimensional image from a flat surface. A stereographer may take a single 2D image and create a stereogram from it.

== Responsibilities ==
The role of a stereographer in modern 3D movies can be summarized as:

- Being part of the film (movie) crew, ideally at the script and screen play revision phase for the best 3D experience. If not possible, then at the very least at the Camera and Scene-blocking stage
- Creating a depth script for the "3D mood" treatment of the movie. This is a creative process with the director, the technical conclusions of which are shared with the director of photography for final recommendations.
- For modern digital movie projection, also coordinating to a certain extent with set and costume designers to creatively suggest minimizing of high contrast colors that may cause stereo crosstalk
- On-location co-ordination with the director of photography to assist in stereo framing and implementation of the depth script. A good stereographer knows how to augment but not restrict the cinematographer.
- Suggest cutaways, cat-in-the-window shots and other time permitting takes to assist the editor with options (footage) to maintain proper depth cuts, during post-production.
- Being present at all post-production sessions to recommend tricks of the trade for unavoidable errors that need to be corrected, and final tweaking of stereo for comfortable viewing.

== See also ==
- 2D to 3D conversion
