= Benno von Arent =

German artist and member of the Nazi Party (1898–1956)

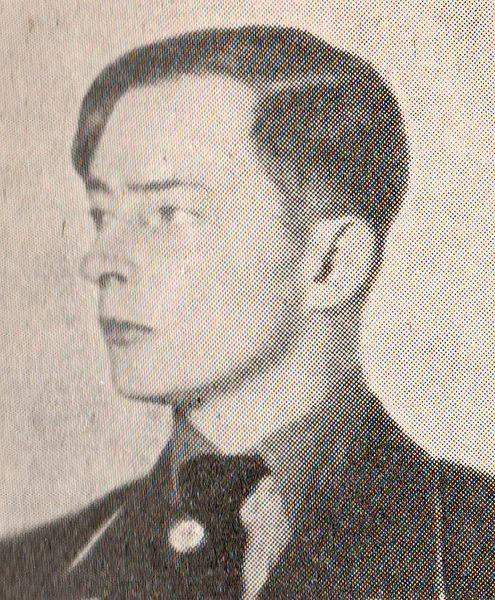
- Born: 19 July 1898; Görlitz, Province of Silesia, German Empire
- Died: 14 October 1956 (aged 58); Bonn, North Rhine-Westphalia, West Germany
- Occupations: Architect; Stage designer
- Political party: Nazi Party

Benno von Arent (19 July 1898 – 14 October 1956) was a German film director, artist, architect, designer and a member of the Nazi Party and SS.

== Early life ==
Arent was born Benno Georg Eduard Wilhelm Joachim von Arent in Görlitz on 19 July 1898, the son of a Prussian Lieutenant Colonel also named Benno von Arent (1868–1904) and grandson of a Prussian Lieutenant General likewise named Benno von Arent.

Arent fought in the First World War and then joined the Freikorps and Reichswehr. In the time of high unemployment he had a number of jobs including car salesman, while teaching himself to be an architect. In 1923, he worked as an outfitter in various theatres across Berlin, initially without success. He also became a member of the völkisch-minded and anti-semitic Militant League for German Culture.

== Career ==
In 1931, he joined the SS and 1932 in the NSDAP. That same year, he became one of the founders of the Bund nationalsozialistischer Bühnen- und Filmkünstler ("Union of National Socialist Stage and Movie Artists"), which was renamed Kameradschaft der Deutschen Künstler ("Fellowship of German Artists") after Hitler's rise to power in 1933.

After some personal assignments for Adolf Hitler in 1936, Arent was appointed Reichsbühnenbildner ("Reich Stage Designer"), a title intended primarily to underscore Arent's exemplary position as a set designer and outfitter. Occasionally, Hitler imposed his own stage designs in a kind of teacher-student relationship, a relationship that would greatly benefit Arent's career. Hitler described him as one of the greatest stage designers. Arent, whose artistic views were shared and probably influenced by Hitler, favored a realistic, often monumental style in his own sets and costumes. Nevertheless, he was ultimately unable to develop his own style, partly due to the outbreak of World War II, and because of competition in his field of expertise.

His task as a designer of street decorations during major marches also had an effect on his stage style. He was also the designer of the diplomatic uniforms for the Foreign Ministry. On 20 April 1937, he received the title of professor, like many other leading Nazi culture officials. In addition to his party responsibilities, Arent continued to work as an architect. His most famous work was the design of the Berlin House of the German Labour Front (DAF). In the spring of 1939, Arent was appointed "Reich Commissioner for Fashion", an office that was soon terminated due to the war.

== Wartime years and death ==
During World War II, Arent, who had been a member of the SS since 1931, joined the staff of Heinrich Himmler. On 15 August 1941, he witnessed the murder of partisans and Jews near Minsk. In 1944, he fought in the Waffen-SS and was appointed SS-Oberführer. Near the end of the war, he fell into Soviet captivity, from which he was released in 1953. In 1956, a denazification process was started against Arent in Berlin. Shortly after his sentencing, Arent died in Bonn, West Germany.

== See also ==
- Nazism and cinema
- List of Nazi Party leaders and officials

== Sources ==
- Ernst Klee: Das Kulturlexikon zum Dritten Reich. Wer war was vor und nach 1945. S. Fischer, Frankfurt am Main 2007, S. 19.
- Benno von Arent in Internationales Biographisches Archiv 50/1956 vom 3. Dezember 1956, im Munzinger-Archiv (Artikelanfang frei abrufbar)
- Sebastian Werr: Heroische Weltsicht. Hitler und die Musik. Boehlau, Wien 2014, S. 172–175.
