= Degenerate Art auction =

Auction of art plundered by the Nazis

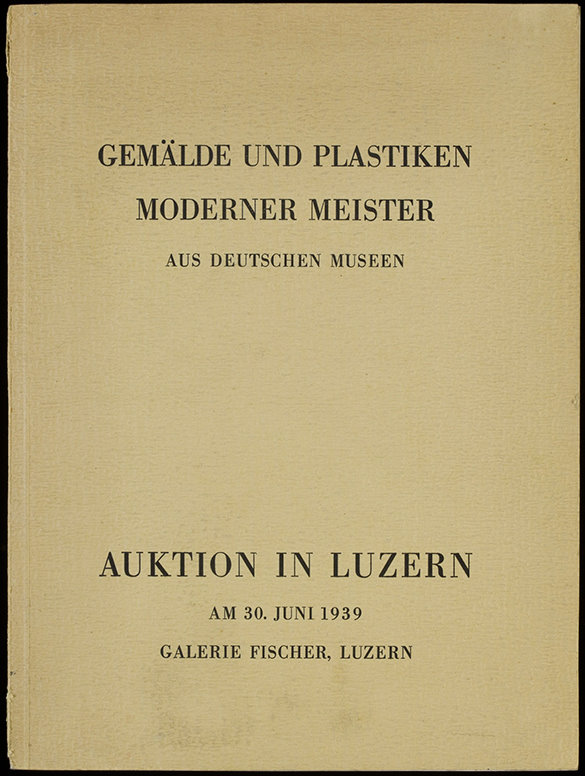
Auction Catalogue of 1939

In 1939 the Gallery Fischer in Lucerne organized an auction of "degenerate" art confiscated by the Nazis. The auction took place on 30 June 1939 in the Grand Hotel National. The auction received considerable international interest, but many of the bidders who were expected to attend were absent because they were worried the proceeds would be used by the Nazi regime.

== Background ==
After the Nazis confiscated thousands of artworks classified as degenerate art from the German Museums, they sought to monetize them. Four art dealers were authorized to sell degenerate art by Germany: Karl Buchholtz and Ferdinand Möller from Berlin, Bernhard A. Böhmer from Güstrow and Hildebrand Gurlitt from Hamburg. The German Ministry of Public Enlightenment and Propaganda discussed opportunities how to place the works on the international market and the idea of an auction was discussed. The earliest trace of the auction in Lucerne is a letter from Theodor Fischer to Heinrich Hoffmann in which he suggests that an auction under his guidance would yield the highest revenues for the Nazis.

In March 1939 he received the contract to organize the auction from the Ministry of Public Enlightenment and Propaganda. In the contract it was established in which outlets the auction would be advertised, that there would be two previews, one in Zurich and another in Lucerne and the auction would be held in Lucerne before the end of June. Also the number of paintings to be depicted in the auction's catalogue was established – eventually sixty paintings were included in the catalogue.

== Previews ==
The preview of the paintings to be auctioned in Zurich took place between the 17 and 27 May. 108 paintings and 17 sculptures were delivered on the 26 April 1939 for the previews. During the preview in Zurich, Georg Schmidt, the director of the Kunstmuseum Basel visited the exhibit and made a first selection of the works he was interested in and following was able to secure several purchases before the auction was to happen. The preview in Lucerne took place in the Gallery Fischer between the 1 and the 29 June 1939.

== Auction ==
The auction was held in the Grand Hotel National at the shores of Lake Lucerne on the 30 June 1939. The languages of the auction were German, French, English and the currency was Swiss francs. Theodor Fischer, the owner of the gallery, was seen as a suitable auctioneer as he was a Gentile art dealer of Switzerland with a vast international network.

=== Bidders ===
The bidders at the auction were several prominent art collectors and representatives of Museums from Switzerland, the United States, Belgium, France, Great Britain, and Sweden. Beside the one from the United States, the Belgian and the Swiss delegations were the most successful ones in the auction. Alfred Barr, director of the Museum of Modern Art in New York, sent Curt Valentin, owner of the Buchholz Gallery in New York, to bid for the MoMa with funds provided by the museum. Alfred Frankfurter bidding for Maurice Wertheim, Joseph Pulitzer jr., Pierre Matisse, the son of the French painter Henri Mattise and Josef von Sternberg were some of the other bidders at the auction

The Basel Kunstmuseum purchased 21 artworks which formed the basis of its modern art collection.

=== Paintings ===
The seized paintings originated from museum collections in Munich, Kassel, Essen, Hamburg, Dresden, Düsseldorf, Wuppertal, Jena, Halle, Essen, Cologne, Berlin and many other, and were made by artists including Max Beckmann, Cuno Amiet, Erich Heckel, Vincent van Gogh, Lovis Corinth, Pablo Picasso and Paul Gauguin among others.

=== Sculptures ===
Several sculptures by Ernst Barlach, one by Alexander Archipenko, one by Otto Dix, three by Wilhelm Lehmbruck, and two by Ewald Matare were also auctioned.

=== Auction ===
Maurice Wertheim bought the Self Portrait of Vincent van Gogh for 170,000 Swiss Francs. The Belgian delegation was able to secure 15 paintings. The Blue House of Marc Chagall, the Portrait of Georg Brandes of Lovis Corinth, Oskar Kokoschkas' Trance Player and Max Liebermanns' Rider at the beach, and two paintings of Pablo Picasso were among the ones acquired by the Belgian delegation. The paintings were transferred to the La Boverie in Liege, Belgium. The Swiss delegation from Basel was able to secure eight paintings of seven artists among which were The Parents of the Artist by Otto Dix, a Self-Portrait by Paula Modersohn-Becker, two paintings by Marc Chagall or the View from a window by André Derain. Forty bidders were successful, but not every artwork found a buyer.

== Revenue ==
The auction didn't have the financial success the Nazis expected. Only 10 percent of the artworks were sold for more than the estimated amount. The revenue was a bit more than 500,000 Swiss Francs which at the time accounted for a modest sum of about $115,000. The revenue was deposited in a bank account in the United Kingdom, where the Nazis had access to it. Following the auction, Fischer attempted to sell the remaining works, but with little success. A second auction was in discussion, but it never materialized.

=== Aftermath ===
Following the auction Fischer didn't return the remaining paintings to Germany as stipulated in the contract. He kept selling some of the works, of which the most prominent painting was the Female Absinth Drinker by Pablo Picasso. It was withheld from the auction due to a legal dispute between the original owner and donor of the painting to the Kunsthalle Hamburg. The painting was sold in 1941.

=== Purchases by the Kunstmuseum Basel ===
The Director of the Museum in 1939 was Georg Schmidt. Schmidt received the auction catalogue from the Gallery Fischer in April 1939 following which the Museum started negotiations to purchase paintings of degenerate art before the auction would take place. Schmidt was able to purchase several paintings, such as Oskar Kokoschkas The Bride of the Wind, Ecce Homo by Lovis Corinth, and the Fate of the Animals by Franz Marc. Fischer unsuccessfully protested against this purchases in mid June 1939.

== Gallery ==
Some of the paintings auctioned are:

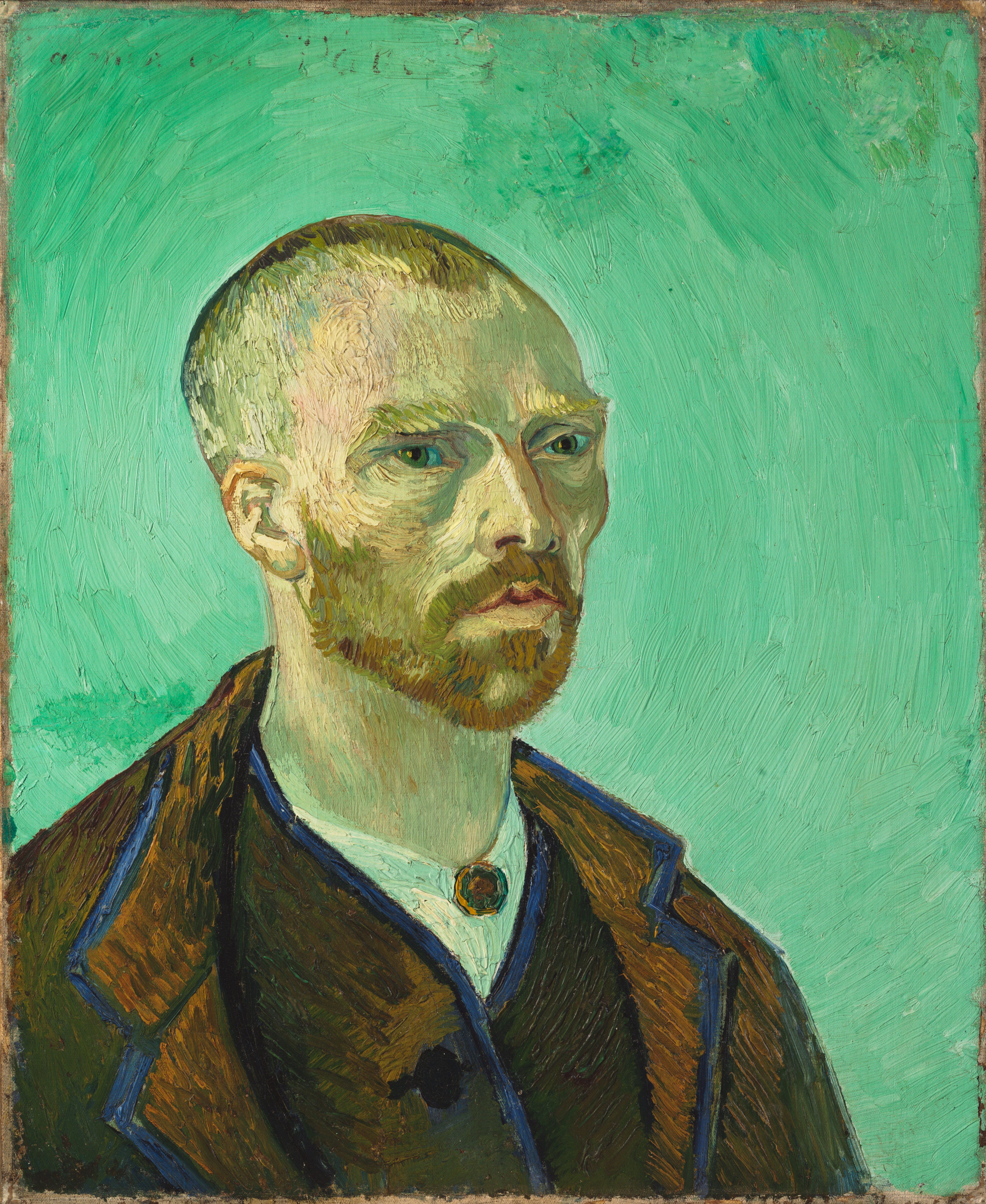
Self Portrait by Vincent van Gogh dedicated to Paul Gauguin

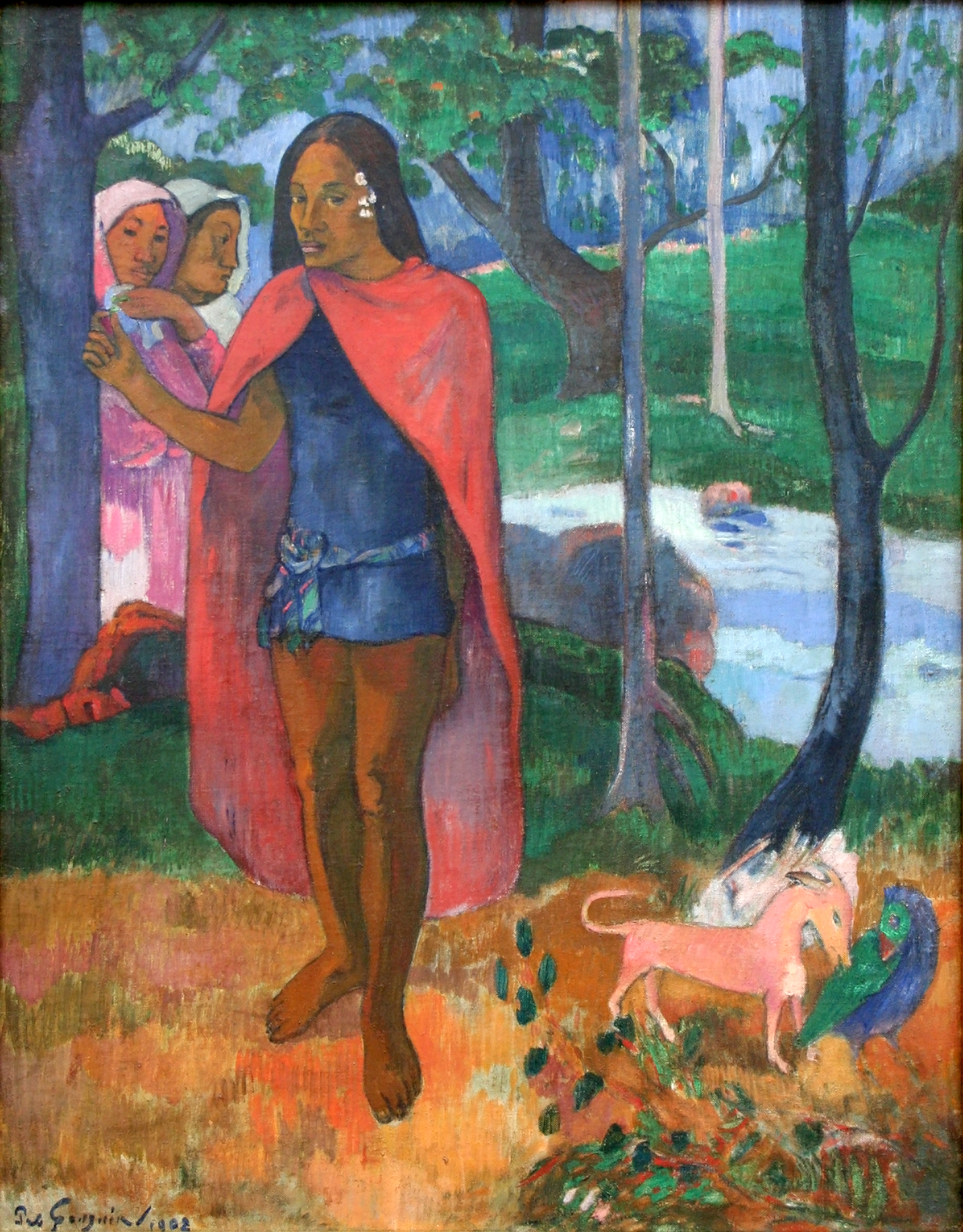
The Sorcerer of Hiva Oa by Paul Gauguin

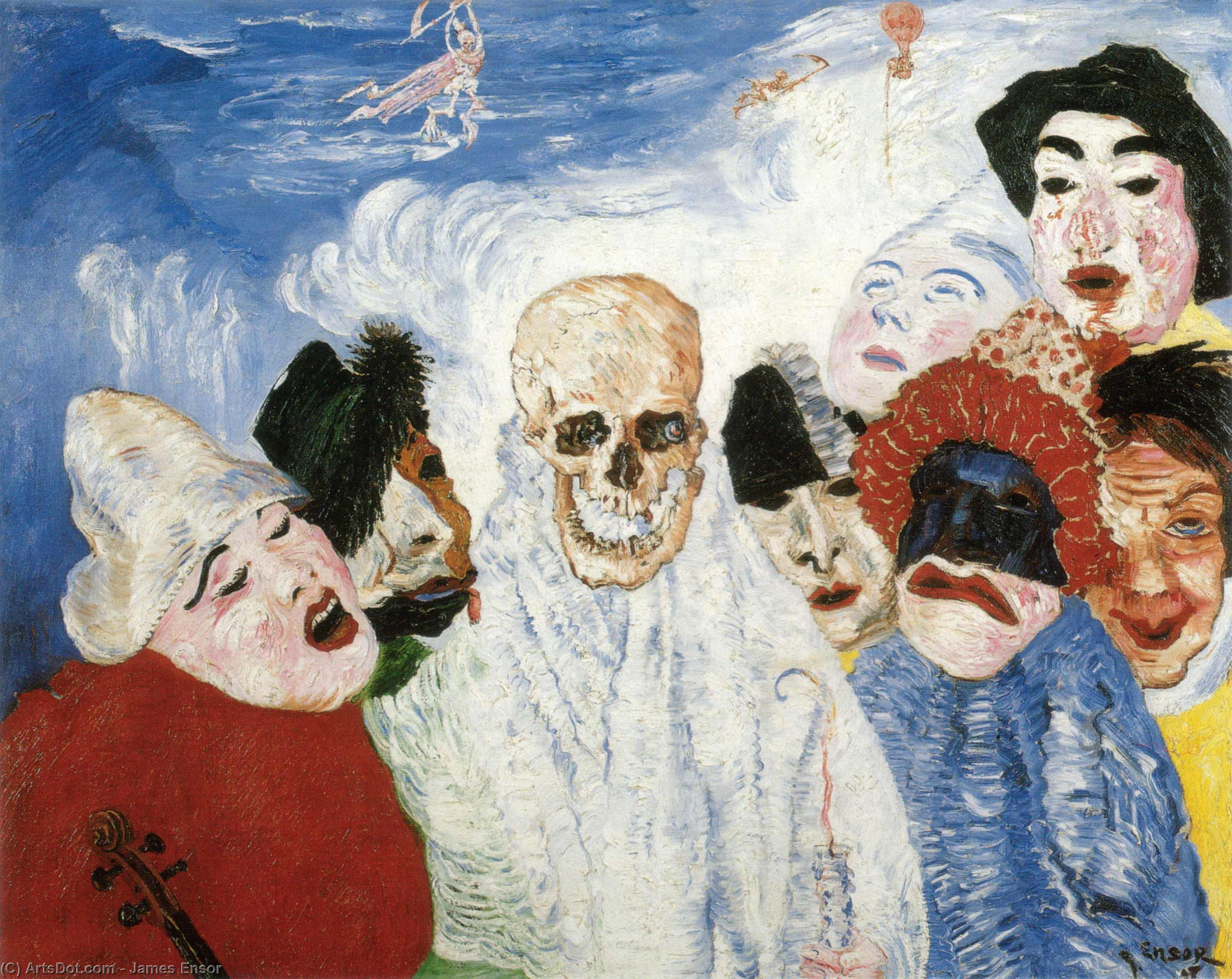
Death and the Masks by James Ensor

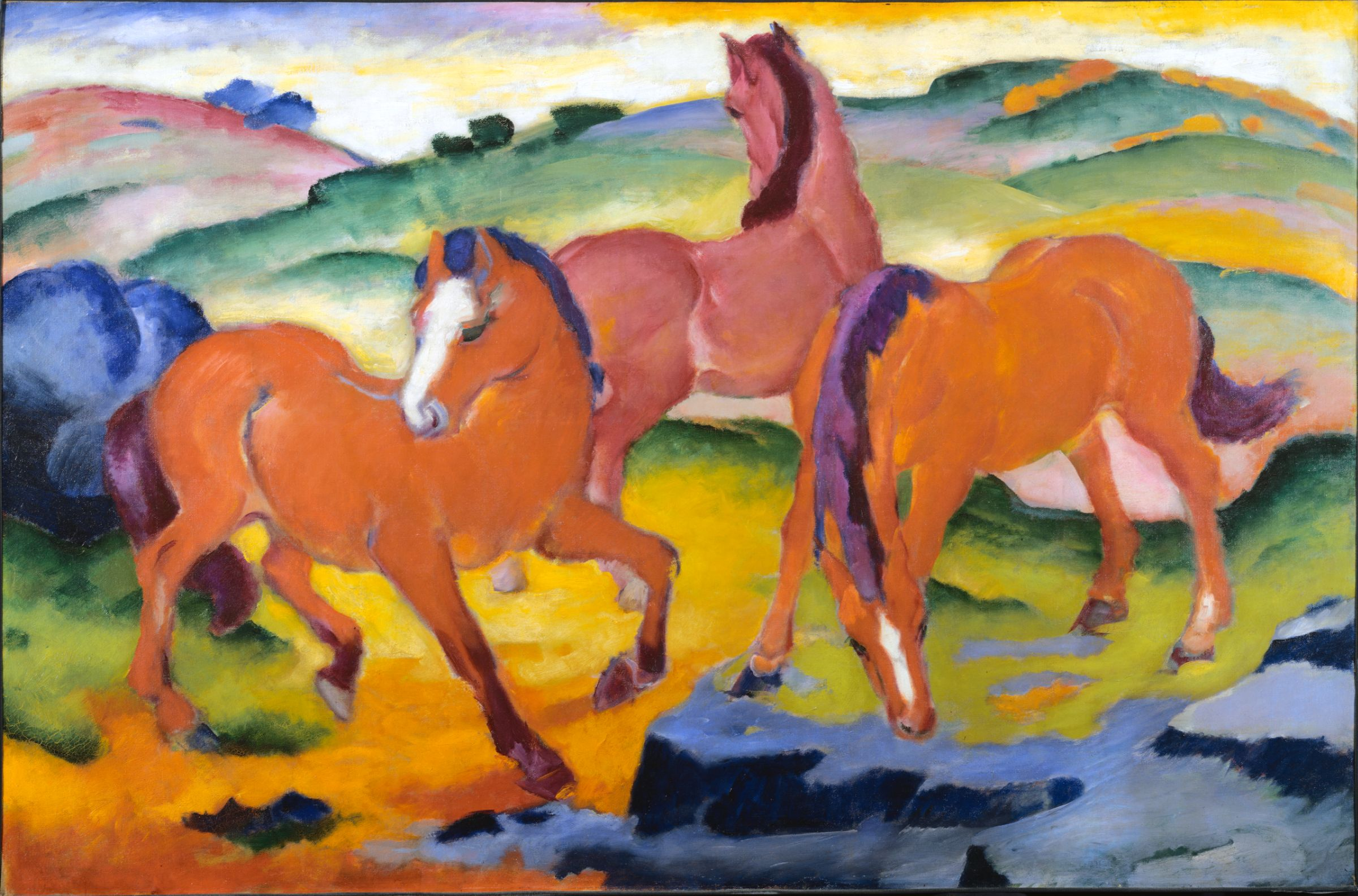
Grazing Horses by Franz Marc

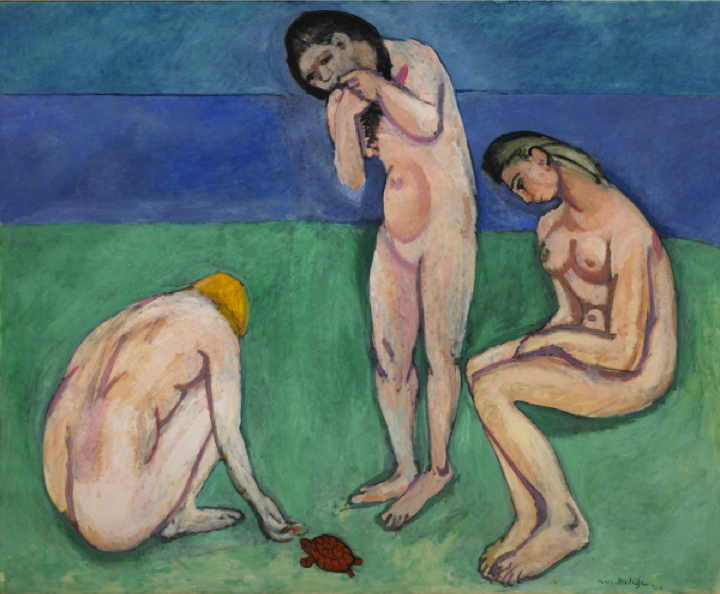
Bathers with a Turtle by Henri Matisse

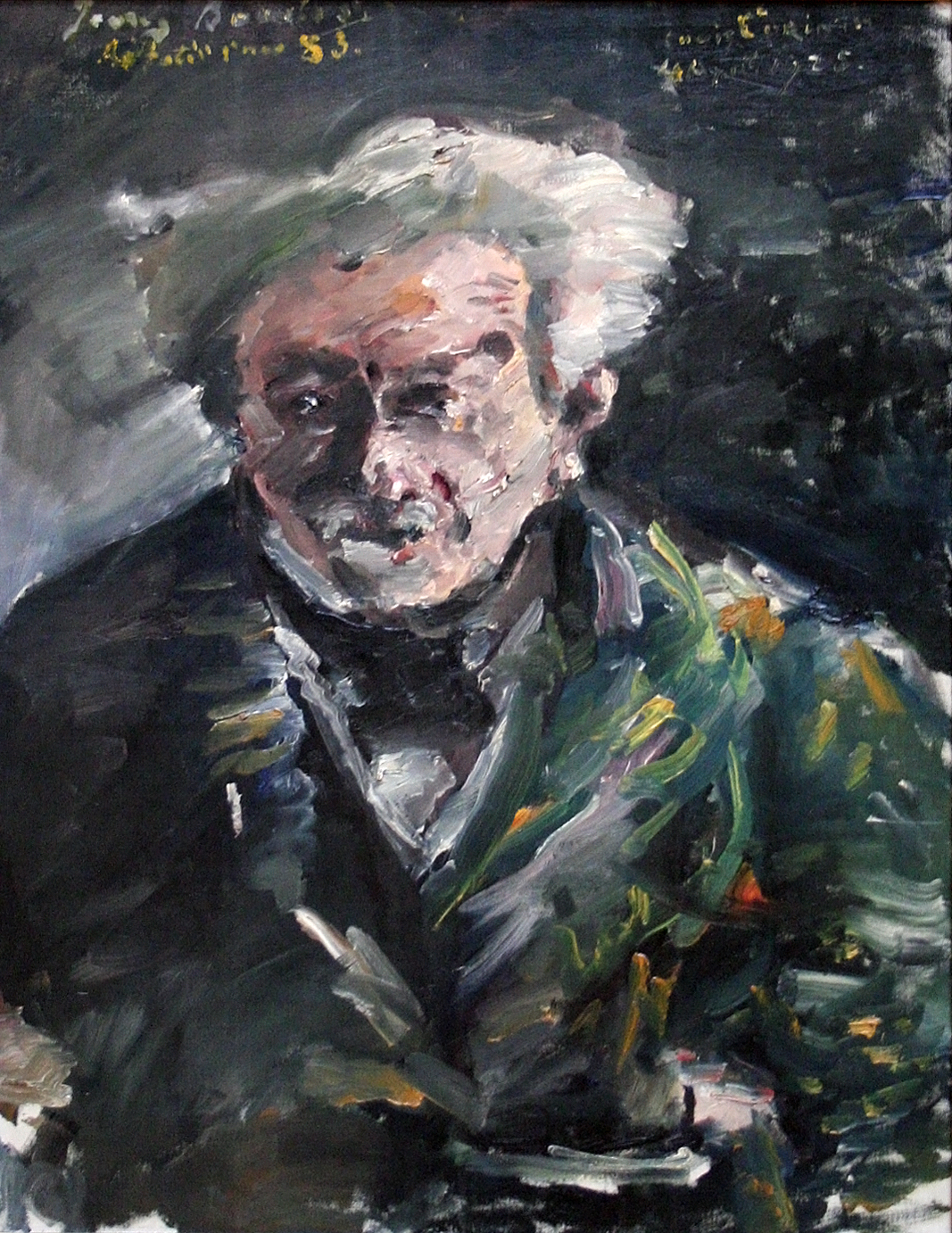
Portrait of George Brandes by Lovis Corinth

== Bibliography ==
- Barron, Stephanie (1992). "Entartete Kunst": das Schicksal der Avantgarde im Nazi-Deutschland : [eine Ausstellung des] Los Angeles County Museum of Art [übernommen vom] Deutschen Historischen Museum (in German). Hirmer Publishers. ISBN 3-7774-5880-5.
