= The Duchess of Montesquiou-Fezensac =

Painting by Oskar Kokoschka

- Die Herzogin von Montesquiou-Fezensac (German)
- Artist: Oskar Kokoschka
- Year: 1910
- Medium: Oil on canvas
- Dimensions: 94.6 cm × 48.9 cm (37.25 in × 19.25 in)
- Location: Cincinnati Art Museum; Cincinnati

The Duchess of Montesquiou-Fezensac is a 1910 oil portrait by Oskar Kokoschka. In this expressionist work Kokoschka strove to capture the essence of his sitter, a young noblewoman afflicted with tuberculosis, with somber tones and stylized gestures. Among his early portraits, Kokoschka considered the work his most valuable, and as his first work to be acquired by a museum it played a key role in establishing the young artist's reputation. During the Nazi period it was confiscated from the Museum Folkwang in Essen and pilloried in the Degenerate Art exhibition before being auctioned off. It is currently in the collection of the Cincinnati Art Museum.

== Background ==
Kokoschka's poster for his play Murderer, the Hope of Women (1909)

The son of lower-middle-class artisans, Oskar Kokoschka got his start attending the Vienna School of Arts and Crafts (Kunstgewerbeschule), where he studied under Carl Otto Czeschka and was heavily influenced by the then-dominant Art Nouveau style of the Vienna Secession.

At his debut at the Vienna Kunstschau 1908, Kokoschka exhibited several provocative proto-expressionistic works, in particular The Dreaming Youths (Die Träumenden Knaben), an illustrated poem laden with sexually charged angst. Gustav Klimt and other leaders of the Secession defended Kokoschka from critics, who labeled him the "chief wild man" of the Kunstschau and blamed him for its financial failure.

Kokoschka further scandalized Viennese polite society with the 1909 debut of his play Murderer, the Hope of Women, which with its dramatic and disturbing costumes and violent sexual imagery was among the first Expressionist dramas. By some accounts the debut ended in a near-riot. Under pressure from above, the director of the School of Arts and Crafts Alfred Roller removed Kokoschka's stipend and expelled him from the School. It was rumored that Kokoschka had drawn the ire of Archduke Franz Ferdinand himself.

While Murderer cost Kokoschka his income, it also brought him to the attention of Adolf Loos, a pioneering architect who opposed what he perceived as the superficiality and ornamental excess of the Secession. In Kokoschka Loos saw a potential ally in his war on ornament, and supported the younger artist by buying artwork from him and introducing him to the rest of his intellectual circle. Loos hit upon the idea of portrait painting as a way for Kokoschka to earn commissions, and encouraged his friends and acquaintances to sit for Kokoschka with the guarantee that he would buy any portrait that the sitter did not like.

In late 1909 Kokoschka accompanied Loos to Switzerland to paint a portrait of Loos's girlfriend Bessie Bruce, who was being treated for tuberculosis in a sanitarium there. Kokoschka ended up staying the entirety of winter 1909-10 in Switzerland, a period that was "extremely fruitful" for him. Thanks to Loos's tireless promotion he would end up painting at least five other portraits while there, among them The Duchess of Montesquiou-Fezensac.

== Subject ==
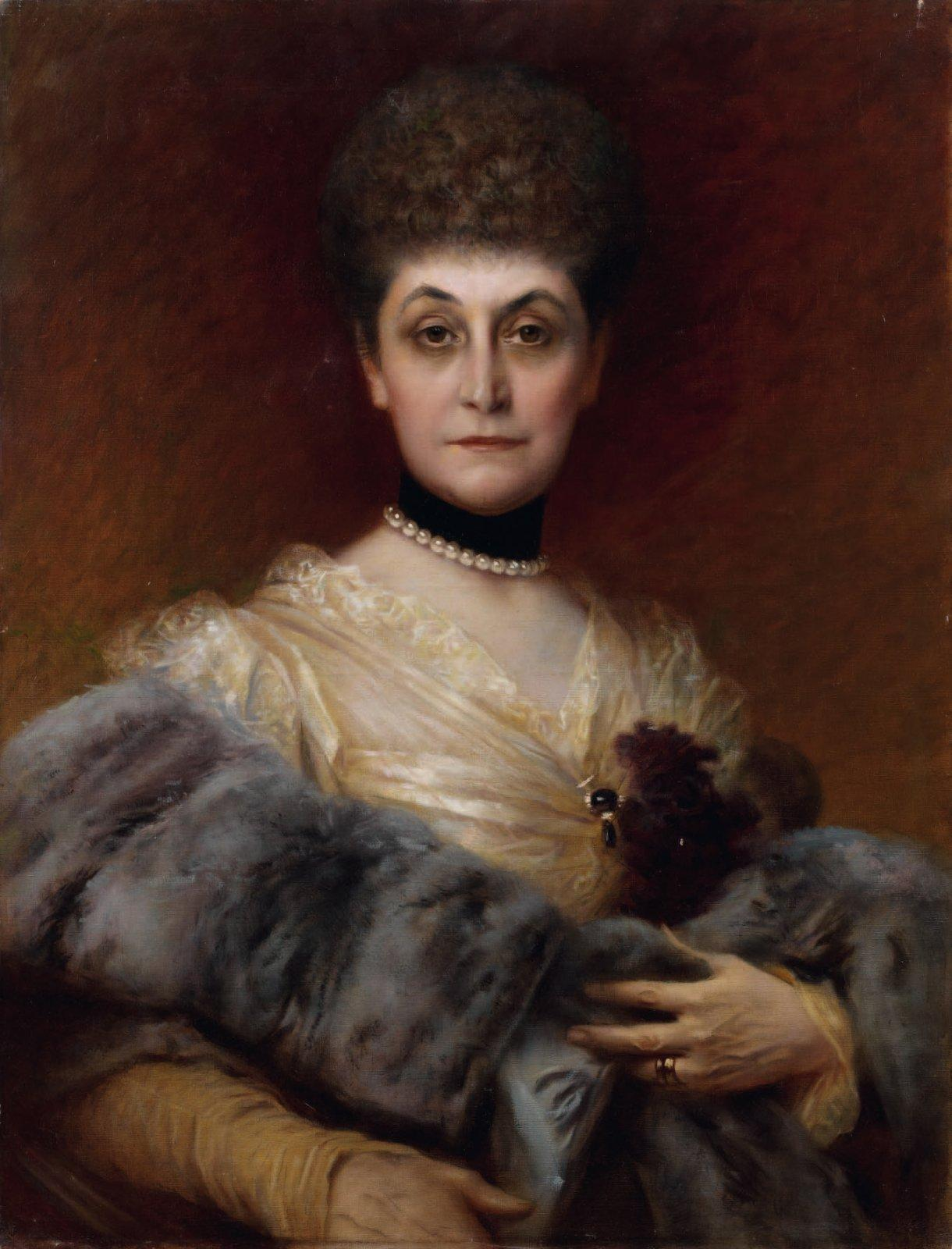
The Duchess's mother Paule Heine, princesse d'Essling, as depicted by the academic painter Édouard Rosset-Granger in 1902

Victoire de Montesquiou-Fezensac was born Victoire Laure Anna Masséna de Rivoli d'Essling in 1888, the second child of Victor Masséna and Paule Heine. Her grandparents on her father's side were the ornithologist Francois Victor Massena and courtier Anne d'Essling; and her great-grandfather was Marshal of the Empire André Masséna. In 1907 she married Joseph Marquis de Montesquiou-Fezensac, a member of the Montesquiou family who would go on to become Duc de Fezensac in 1913.

When Kokoschka arrived at the Swiss sanitarium to paint Bessie's portrait the Duchess and her husband were there undergoing treatment for tuberculosis. Kokoschka later recalled their meeting:

In Les Avants I painted a portrait of Bessy Loos [sic] and was introduced by her to the marquise and marquis of Rohan-Montesquieu. She was a marvelously thin, tall, pale creature and wore a black velvet two-piece which made her look even thinner. She was consumptive and seemed to me so beautiful that I immediately fell head over heels in love with her [...] There was a rumor that he [her husband] was at times rather rough with her; she herself once hinted at something of the kind when she did the honor of showing me her room. With its quiet, sad atmosphere and yellowing photographs on the wall it suited her well. — Oskar Kokoschka, Stories from My Life, pp. 55-56

Despite her haggard appearance, the Duchess was only 22 at the time the portrait was painted. She never recovered from her condition and died in 1919 at the age of 30.

== Analysis ==
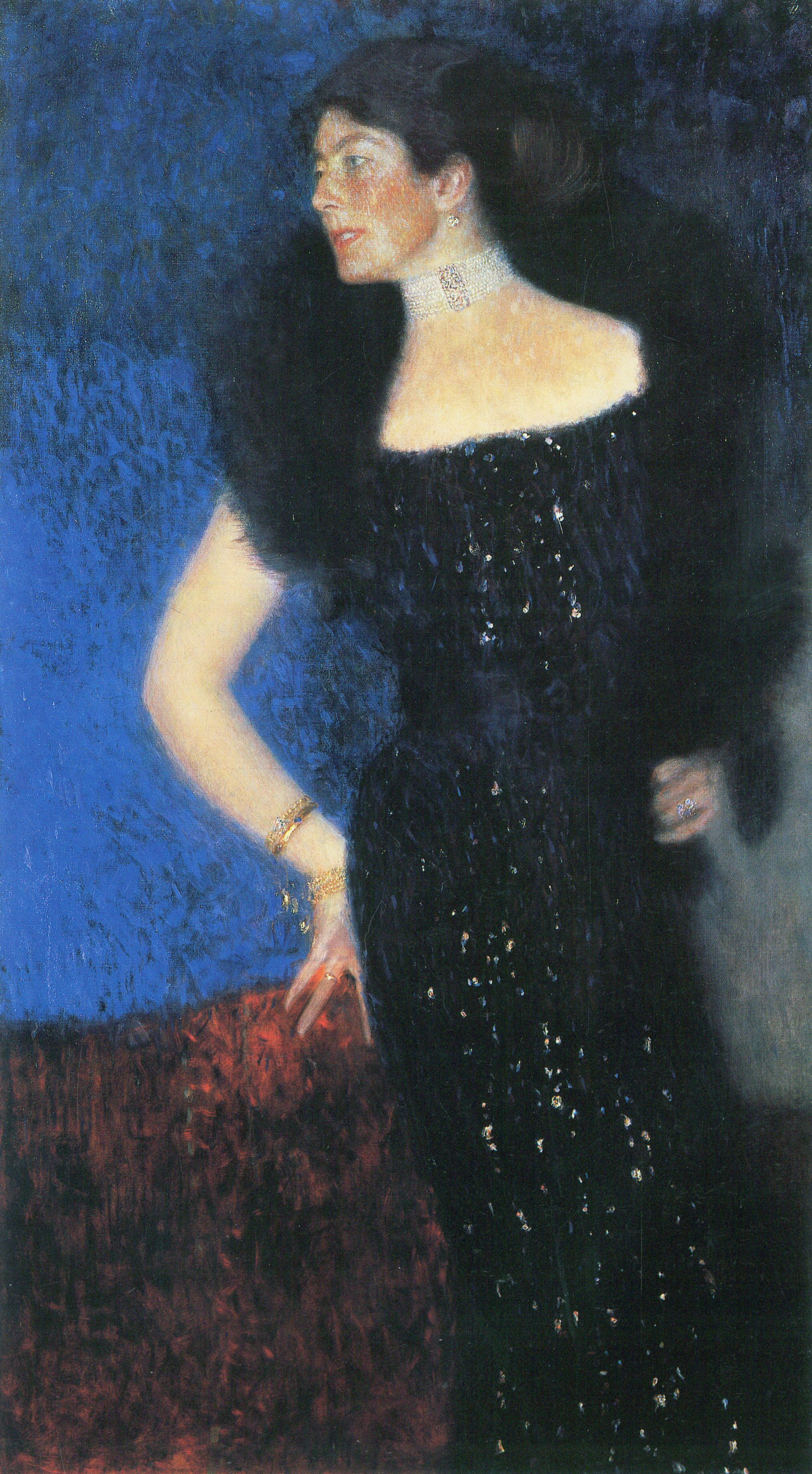
Gustav Klimt's 1901 Portrait of Rose von Rosthorn-Friedmann

The Duchess is depicted in half length, standing or perhaps leaning in front of an undefined dark background. She wears an elegant evening gown with a square neckline and a simple pearl choker. Her downturned face has a pensive expression; her features are thin and worn, prematurely aged by the disease ravaging her body. Her right hand holds a handkerchief, her left rests at waist height, contorted into an anatomically impossible position. There is no apparent light source; rather, she appears to glow softly from within.

Kokoschka emphasizes the contrast between the Duchess's ravaged body and that lambent inwardness, seeing in her a reflection of "...those aristocratic women who used to seek consolation in their faith, back in the days of religious upheavals when the world was so godless that only mystics still believed in paradise, which they placed in their own hearts." This kind of idealization was a common trope in fin-de-siècle thought - the "consumptive sublime," in which "women enveloped in illness were the visual equivalents of spiritual purity."

Kokoschka's contemporaries contrasted the Duchess with Klimt's decorative, glamorous high-society portraits. "Why did I think of Klimt all of a sudden?" Else Lasker-Schüler wrote upon viewing it, "He is a botanist, Kokoschka a planter. Where Klimt picks a flower, Kokoschka pulls up the plant by the roots."

Along with the rest of Kokoschka's early portraits, the Duchess thus marks a departure from the formalized, surface-oriented portraiture then current in fin-de-siècle Vienna, where "representation had adopted a particularly referential position... portraits represented no one; they represent someone as some one else." Instead, "...no one in Kokoschka's early portraits is represented, as the conventions of the times demanded, in a manner befitting social status - not gloriously, charitably, or even realistically." Kokoschka's goal in this was to create "a new kind of psychological portraiture" in which the essence of the subject was isolated and expressed.

== Provenance ==
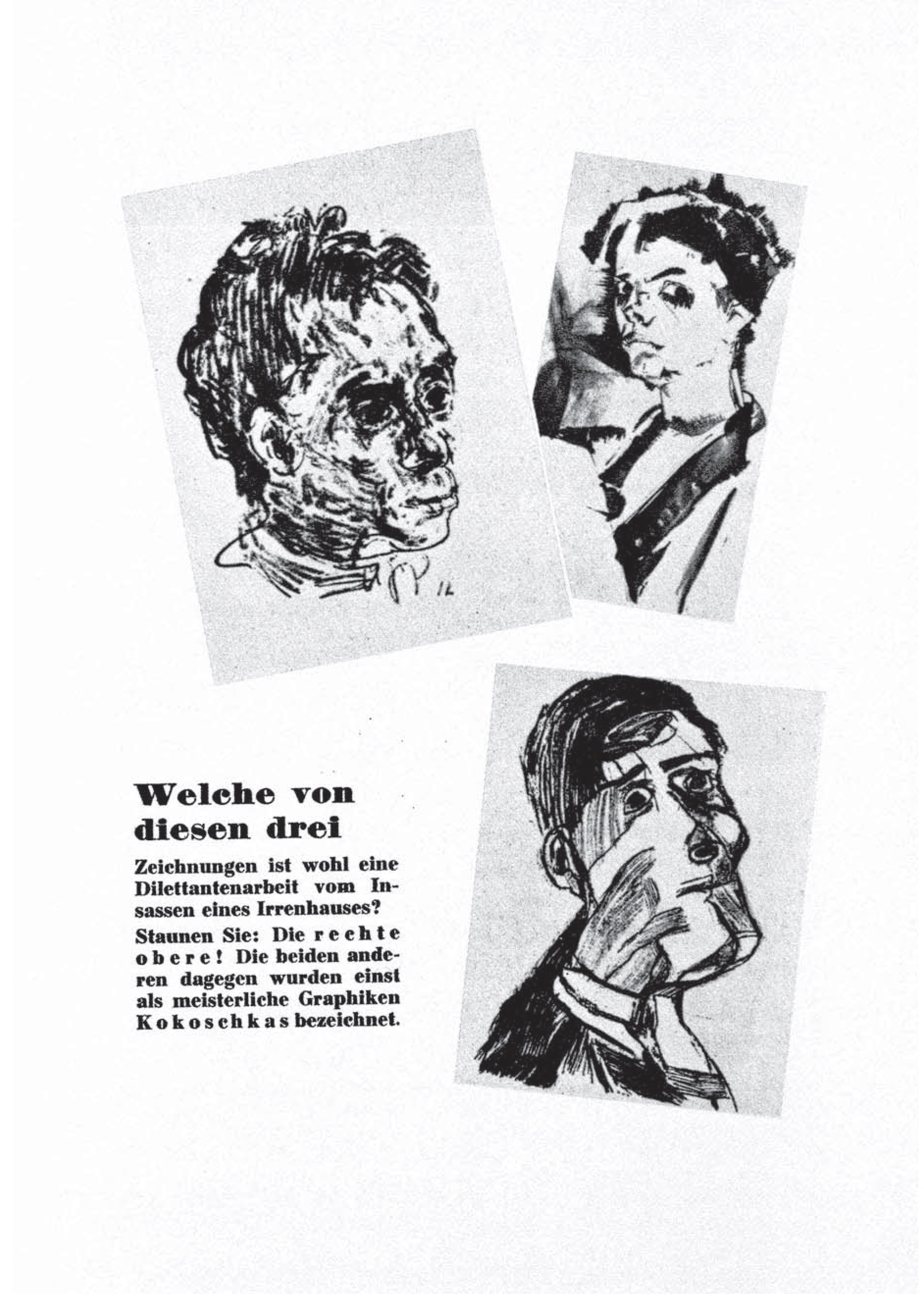
A page from the exhibition catalog of Degenerate Art mocking Kokoschka. "Which of these three drawings is the dabbling of an insane asylum inhabitant? Surprise - it's the top right one! The others were previously described as Kokoschka's masterworks."

None of the people who agreed to sit for Kokoschka during his Switzerland trip decided to purchase the resulting portraits, including the Duchess and her husband. Instead, the portraits were exhibited in June 1910 at Galerie Paul Cassirer in Berlin in a show organized by Herwarth Walden at Loos's urging. At one point the painting was temporarily misplaced in transit to Berlin; Kokoschka desperately wrote Walden asking to be informed as soon as it was found, stating "it is my most valuable picture." The Duchess's portrait was shown under the title A Precious Woman; her husband's A Brutal Egoist.

The Berlin exhibition proved successful, and the portrait of the Duchess was purchased by Karl Ernst Osthaus for the Folkwang Museum in Hagen. It was Kokoschka's first artwork to be acquired by a museum; an important step in the 24-year-old artist's career. After Osthaus's death in 1921 his museum's collection was purchased by the City of Essen and merged with the Essener Kunstmuseum, forming the Museum Folkwang in 1922.

In 1937 the painting was confiscated by the Nazi regime as part of a coordinated effort to purge so-called "degenerate art" from the Reich. It was pilloried in the Munich Degenerate Art exhibition, where it hung on the south wall of room four opposite Kokoschka's The Bride of the Wind, then held in storage at Schönhausen Palace until 1939, when it was sold at the Degenerate Art auction at Galerie Fischer in Lucerne, Switzerland. It was lot number 65 in the auction and sold for 3,000 Swiss francs.

The buyer, through the intermediary Fritz Steinmeyer, was the diplomat and art collector Paul E. Geier, who also purchased Franz Marc's Grazing Horses IV at the auction. Upon Geier's death in 1983 the painting became a part of the Cincinnati Art Museum, where it still resides.

The portrait of the Duchess's husband, Marquis Joseph de Montesquiou-Fezensac, which had also been looted by the Nazis and auctioned off, ended up in the Moderna Museet in Stockholm. In 2018 it was restituted to the heirs of the original owner Alfred Flechtheim, who then sold it for $20 million.

However, the Museum Folkwang and other state-owned German museums affected by Nazi looting have generally not tried to reclaim works such as the Duchess because at the time, the works of art were the property of the German government, and their removal and sale was legal under German law.
