= Curt Valentin =

German-Jewish art dealer (1902–1954)

Curt Valentin (5 October 1902, Hamburg, Germany – 19 August 1954, Forte dei Marmi, Italy) was a German-Jewish art dealer known for handling modern art, particularly sculpture, and works classified as "degenerate", seized from public museums or looted from private collectors by the Nazi regime in Germany.

After 1927 Curt Valentin worked for Alfred Flechtheim in Berlin. In 1934, he worked at Karl Buchholz Gallery, Hamburg from 1934 to 1936 until antisemitic National Socialist laws preventing Jews from practicing their professions in Germany.

Dismissed from his job in Germany in late 1936 Valentin emigrated to America and opened the Buchholz Gallery in September 1937 in New York City. A key figure in the dispersal of so-called "degenerate" art, he had permission to sell German art in America, from the Nazi authorities to help fund Hitler's war efforts. This resulted from Buchholz's gallery being one of four dealers—together with Ferdinand Möller (Berlin), Hildebrand Gurlitt (Hamburg), and Bernhard A. Böhmer (Güstrow)—who worked closely with Hitler’s Propaganda Ministry with the disposal of such art for profit.

On June 30, 1939, Curt Valentin bid for art looted by the Nazis that was being auctioned at the Galerie Fischer in Lucerne on behalf of Alfred H. Barr Jr. who provided money donated to the Museum of Modern Art. In 1951 the gallery was renamed the Curt Valentin Gallery. His gallery operated from 1951, until a year after his death in 1954, and handled works by many notable artists including Alexander Calder, Henry Moore, Marino Marini, Irving Kriesberg, and Jacques Lipchitz.

== Art restitution cases ==
Numerous art restitution cases involve artworks which passed through Curt Valentin after being seized by the Nazis from museums or from private art collectors who were persecuted by the Nazis because of their Jewish heritage. Provenance research projects are ongoing around the world to clarify the origins of artworks sold by Valentin.

== See also ==
- Theodor Fischer
