= Kalifala Sidibé =

Sudanese artist

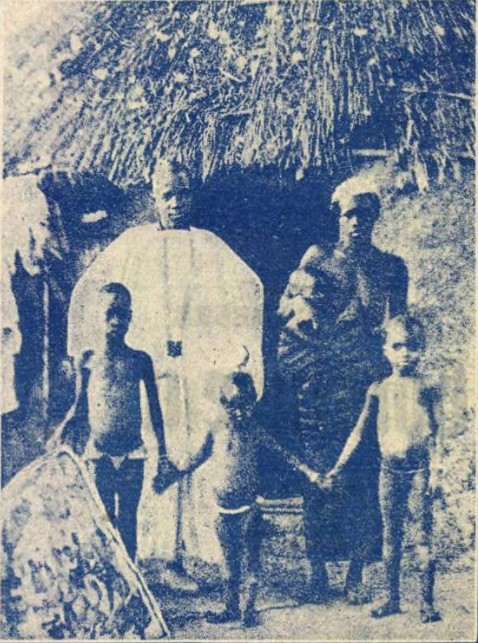
Kalifala Sidibe with family

Kalifala Sidibé (c. 1900-1930) was a painter who lived and worked in French Sudan, the modern-day Mali. He toured Europe, and an exhibition catalogue with an introduction by Le Corbusier was produced for his 1929 show in Paris. The Smithsonian has a collection of his color illustrations.

== Biography ==
Kalifala Sidibé was born in Kankan, French Sudan, in 1900. He had a wife and three children.

Without ever being exposed to art, Sidibé taught himself to paint, using jute sacks and dye from the cotton factory where he worked. He claimed to have been driven to paint by "the Devil", and was ejected from his tribe for painting. Sidibé was said to have been discovered by Henri Hirsch, a banker working in French West Africa. Hirsch wrote to politician and publicist Georges Huisman, including photos of Sidibé and the artwork. Huisman wrote of Sidibé's process:

"When he commences painting, he hunches down outside his hut at a rickety table put together with rough planks. An old calendar serves as a drawing board and surface. He puts the board under the canvas and makes paints always starting from the left. Sidibé composes his large canvases in sections without ever making a sketch or under drawing."

Sidibé's work was first shown in a group exhibition at the Galerie Georges Bernheim in Paris in October 1929. Though only four pieces sold, Sidibé received positive feedback. The press focused largely on Sidibé as an "authentic" black painter whose style was developed independent of European influence. Sidibé then exhibited forty-two paintings at Gummensons Konsthall in Stockholm and twenty paintings at the Neue Gallerie in Vienna in 1930, as well as thirty paintings at Galerie Alfred Flechtheim in Berlin in 1931, one year after his death. Modernist architect Le Corbusier saw Sidibé's work as neither modern nor traditional. In a note that appeared in the catalogues of both the Gummensons Konsthall and Galerie Alfred Flechtheim exhibitions, he traced the style to Asian influence, writing:

"This Negro gives me the impression [of] belonging to some race, which through Arabia, seems to have been in contact with Persians and Hindus. I even believe that in the olden days India belonged to the Negro. This painter is loaded with Asian characteristics, expressed partly through the tone of his poetry, partly through his style as a painter."

Some critics dismissed Sidibé's artistry, with one reviewer describing the exhibition of his work in Europe as "a war cry from a savage in the middle of an elegant and eloquent discussion". Others saw his style as a show of "innocence" from an African uninfluenced by Western values. Sidibé died in 1930. His death was mentioned in Beaux-Arts in December 1930. Because he signed his name in Arabic, many of his works are lost.
