= Bathers with a Turtle =

1907–08 painting by Henri Matisse

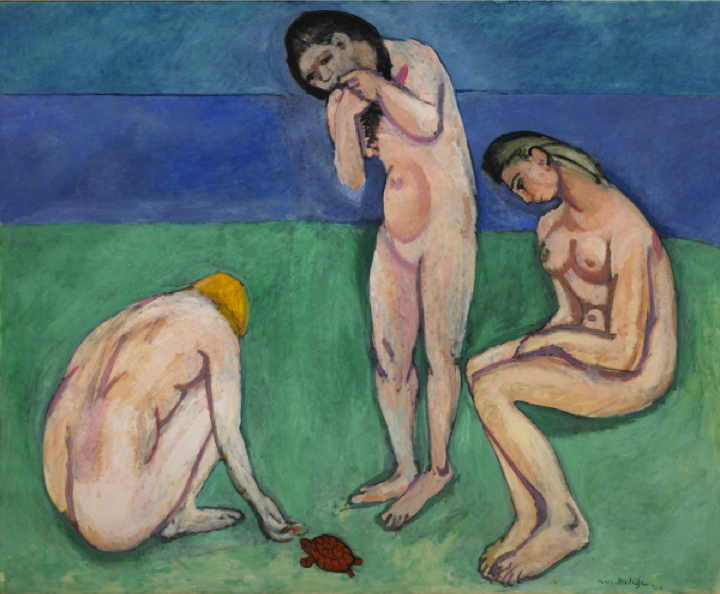
Bathers with a Turtle (Baigneuses), 1907–08, oil on canvas, 71½ × 87 in. (181.6 × 221 cm), Saint Louis Art Museum, St. Louis

Bathers with a Turtle is a painting by Henri Matisse from 1907 to 1908, in the collection of the Saint Louis Art Museum in St. Louis, Missouri. In 1908 it was acquired by Karl Ernst Osthaus who included it into the Folkwang Museum in Hagen, Germany. It was removed from being exhibited by the Nazis in 1937 and brought to Niederschönhausen Palace. It was purchased for $2400 by Joseph Pulitzer Jr. in 1939 at an auction of art that the Nazi government considered "degenerate". The socalled "Degenerate Art auction" took place in the Grand Hotel National in Lucerne, Switzerland. Pulitzer purchased it at the urging of Matisse's son Pierre Matisse, in order to prevent the artwork from being destroyed, despite the profit from the auction going to the Nazis. Pulitzer later donated it to the art museum in Saint Louis.

== See also ==
- List of works by Henri Matisse
