= Karl Buchholz (art dealer) =

Nazi German art dealer

Karl Buchholz (born 26 August 1901 in Göttingen; died 6 January 1992 in Bogotá) was one of Hitler's Nazi art dealers specialized in selling looted "Degenerate Art".

== Early life ==
Buchholz took his first job in Berlin, where he started his own bookstore on Taubenstrasse in 1925. In 1926 he expanded his business on Mauerstrasse and two branches were soon added in Berlin. In 1934, the international bookstore on Leipziger Strasse included a gallery of contemporary art on the floor above the shop, where Curt Valentin worked until he emigrated in 1937 and founded the Buchholz Gallery on 46th Street in New York.

== Dealer in Nazi confiscated art ==
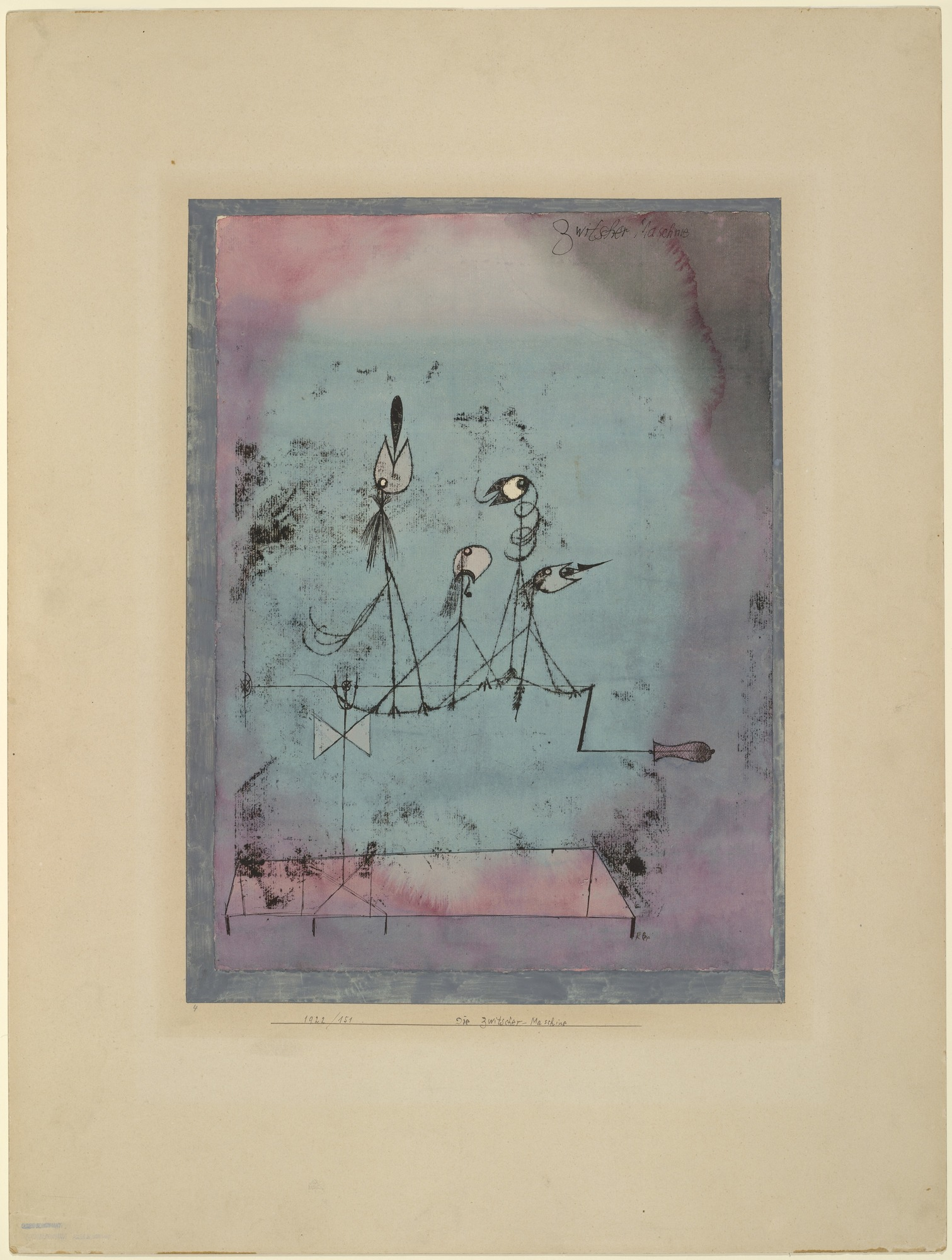
Paul Klee: The Twitter Machine, 1922, oil break and watercolor on paper on cardboard, sold through Buchholz to the Museum of Modern Art, New York, 1939 for US$75.

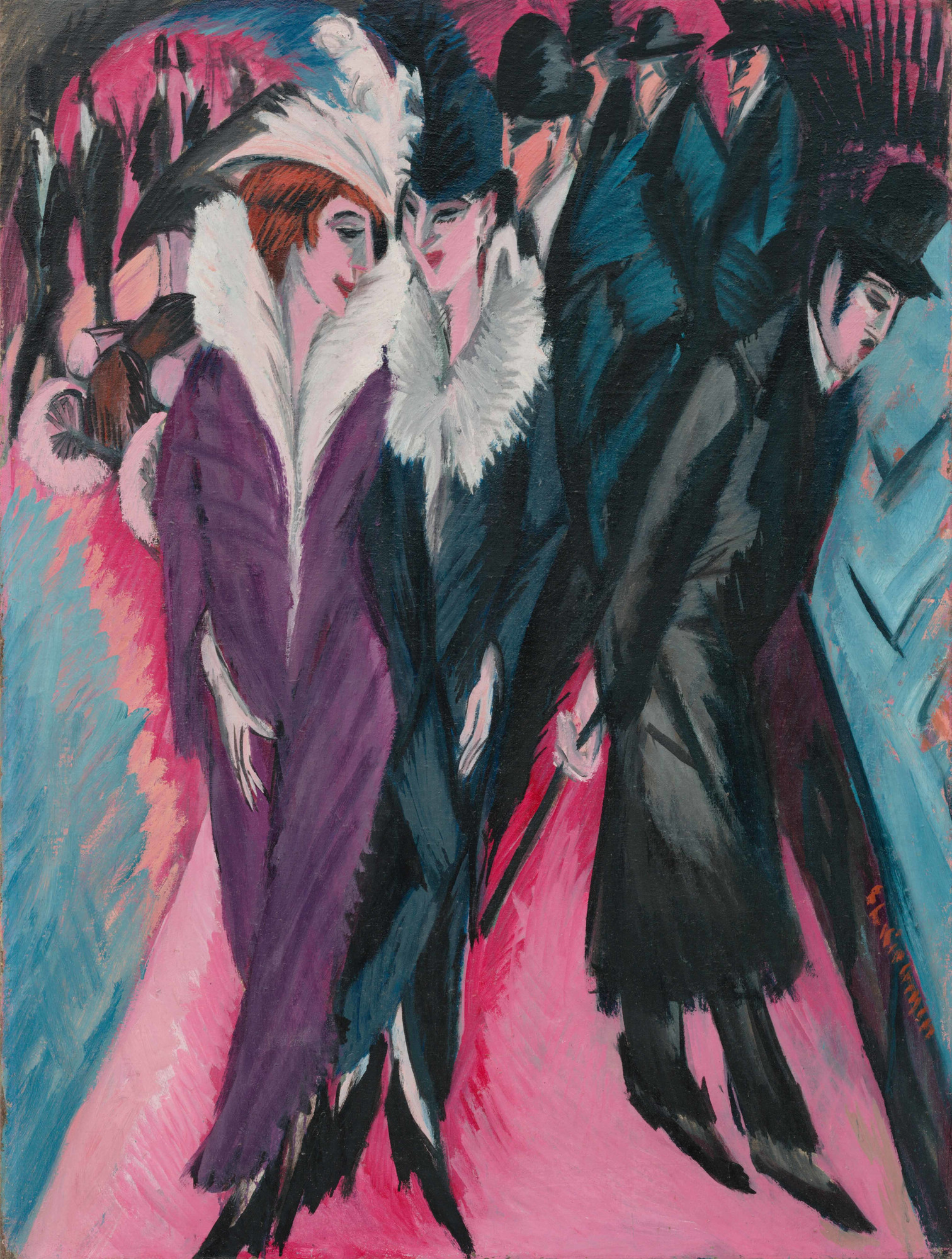
Ernst Ludwig Kirchner: Die Straße, 1913, oil on canvas, sold through Buchholz to the Museum of Modern Art, New York, 1939 for US$160.

Karl Buchholz dealt in art looted by the Nazis, both from museums and from Jewish collectors. When the Nazis attacked modern art as “Degenerate Art”, Karl Buchholz was commissioned from 1938 together with Ferdinand Möller, Hildebrand Gurlitt and Bernhard A. Böhmer by Goebbels's Reich Ministry of People's Enlightenment and Propaganda to sell the confiscated works of art to raise cash for the Third Reich. The discovery of the Gurlitt stash in 2012/2013 suggests that some of the art was kept for personal profit as well.

Buchholz sold art in Norway, Switzerland and the United States and supplied east coast museums through his New York gallery. Buchholz in Germany worked with Valentin in New York. Valentin, a Jew, received special permission from the Nazis to sell art in New York. Buchholz' daughter Godula described the unusual circumstances of Valentin's emigration to the United States. As part of their program of robbing Jews, the Nazis usually prevented fleeing Jews from taking assets with them. But, according to Godula Buchholz, Valentin carried “baggage containing sculptures, [p]aintings, and drawings from the Galerie Buchholz in Berlin”

In 1942 Buchholz was expelled from the Reich Chamber of Fine Arts. When the United States entered World War II, communications with Valentin were said to be broken off before resuming postwar. In 1943 he founded a branch in Lisbon. On 29 May 1944, citing the Trading with the Enemy Act, the U.S. government seized 401 artworks that Buchholz had shipped to Valentin.

== Postwar investigation and emigration to Colombia ==
After the war, Buchholz was investigated by the OSS Art Looting Intelligence Unit because of his trafficking in confiscated and looted art. According to the OSS, the spy Wilhelm Gessmann (alias Alexander, Joan Charles; Alendorf, Wilhelm) worked as a representative of the Buchholz art and bookselling establishments in Berlin and Lisbon. and Enrique Lehrfeld was Buchholz' partner in the New German Bookshop in Lisbon, 50 avda da Liberdade.

After the end of the war, Buchholz emigrated with his family to Colombia and from 1951 ran a bookstore and gallery in Bogotá, the Librería Buchholz, which his daughter Godula Buchholz, born in 1935, later took over. Buchholz became the publisher of the literary magazine Eco, founded in 1960. Revista de la cultura de Occidente, which lasted until 1984.

== Restitution claims for Nazi-looted art ==
The Buchholz-Valentin partnership has emerged in several restitution claims concerning art looted from private Jewish art collectors and dealers. Claims filed in U.S. courts concern art allegedly stolen from Georg Grosz and from Alfred Flechtheim which transited through Buchholz' partner Curt Valentin as well as from Alphonse Kann and others. Claims that have gone before German commissions include artworks that belonged to Clara Levy, a textile manufacturer who was persecuted by the Nazis.

Karl Buchholz played a key role in laundering Nazi-looted art and is the subject of ongoing studies and his name appears in numerous claims for restitution.

== See also ==
- Degenerate art
- Curt Valentin
- List of claims for restitution for Nazi-looted art
- Nazi Germany

== Publications ==
- Blumen-, Frucht und Dornenstücke. Leipzig 1933.

== Catalogs of the gallery in Germany ==
- Aquarelle Jüngerer Künstler: Galerie Karl Buchholz: 27. Ausstellung vom 13. bis 30. November 1937.
- Neuere Arbeiten von Theo Champion ... [et al.]: Galerie Karl Buchholz: 28. Ausstellung, 27. Dez. 1937 bis 29. Jan. 1938.
- Hanna Nagel, Hans Fischer: Zeichnungen: Galerie Karl Buchholz: 30. Ausstellung, 30. März bis 30. April 1938.
- Ausstellung: Ludwig Kasper – Plastik: Galerie Karl Buchholz, 4. Mai bis 3. Juni 1939.
- Bildhauerkunst, Neue Skulpturen und Zeichnungen: Galerie Karl Buchholz: 33. Ausstellung 4. Oktober bis 12. November 1938
- Dichter als Maler: Oelbilder, Aquarelle und Zeichnungen, Galerie Karl Buchholz: 35. Ausstellung, 18. Januar bis 8. Februar 1939.
- Robert Pudlich: Bilder, Aquarelle und Zeichnungen; Gerhard Marcks, Zoltan Székessy: Plastik und Zeichnungen: 36. Ausstellung.
- Emil van Hauth, Ölbilder, Philipp Harth, Plastik: Galerie Karl Buchholz: 37. Ausstellung vom 1. April bis 25. April 1939.
- Landschaftsaquarelle Jüngerer Maler: Galerie Karl Buchholz: 39. Ausstellung vom 3. Juli bis 11. August 1939.
- Geist der Antiken in der neueren Kunst: Galerie Karl Buchholz, Berlin 24. August bis 30. September 1939.
- Karl Eulenstein, Ölbilder, Fritz Cremer, Plastik: Galerie Karl Buchholz: 42. Ausstellung vom 18. Nov. bis 9. Dez. 1939.
- Ausstellung: Bildhauer der Gegenwart: Karl Buchholz Galerie Berlin, 10. Okt. bis 9. Nov. 1940.

== Literature ==
- Andreas Hüneke: Einer Legende begegnen. Besuch bei Karl Buchholz. In: Bildende Kunst 1, 1991, Heft 3, S. 54–55.
- Revista de revistas, Empresa Editora "Revista de Revistas, S.A.", México, 1992, S. 135.
- Josephine Gabler: „Vor allem aber, er hat keine Angst, sich durch die Ausstellung zu schaden.“ Die Buch- und Kunsthandlung Karl Buchholz in Berlin. In: Ateliergemeinschaft Klosterstrasse. Berlin 1994, S. 84–95.
- Godula Buchholz: Karl Buchholz, Buch- und Kunsthändler im 20. Jahrhundert. Sein Leben und seine Buchhandlungen und Galerien Berlin, New York, Bukarest, Lissabon, Madrid, Bogotá. DuMont, Köln 2005, ISBN 978-3-8321-7943-4.
- Monica Richarz: Galerie Buchholz – eine Oase moderner Kunst. In: Gute Geschäfte – Kunsthandel in Berlin 1933–1945. Aktives Museum Faschismus und Widerstand in Berlin, Berlin 2011, ISBN 978-3-00-034061-1, S. 29–34.
- Anja Tiedemann: Die „entartete“ Moderne und ihr amerikanischer Markt. Karl Buchholz und Curt Valentin als Händler verfemter Kunst, Oldenbourg Akademieverlag, Berlin 2013, ISBN 978-3-05-00612-76.

== Links ==
- Buchholz Gallery, Eintrag in Archives Directory for the History of Collecting in America
- Maria Cristina Pignalosa: KARL BUCHHOLZ Y SU PASIÓN POR LAS LETRAS, El Tiempo, 2. September 2000
- "Bridges from the Reich: The Importance of Émigré Art Dealers as Reflected in the Case Studies of Curt Valentin and Otto Kallir–Nirenstein"
