= Katja Terlau =

German art historian

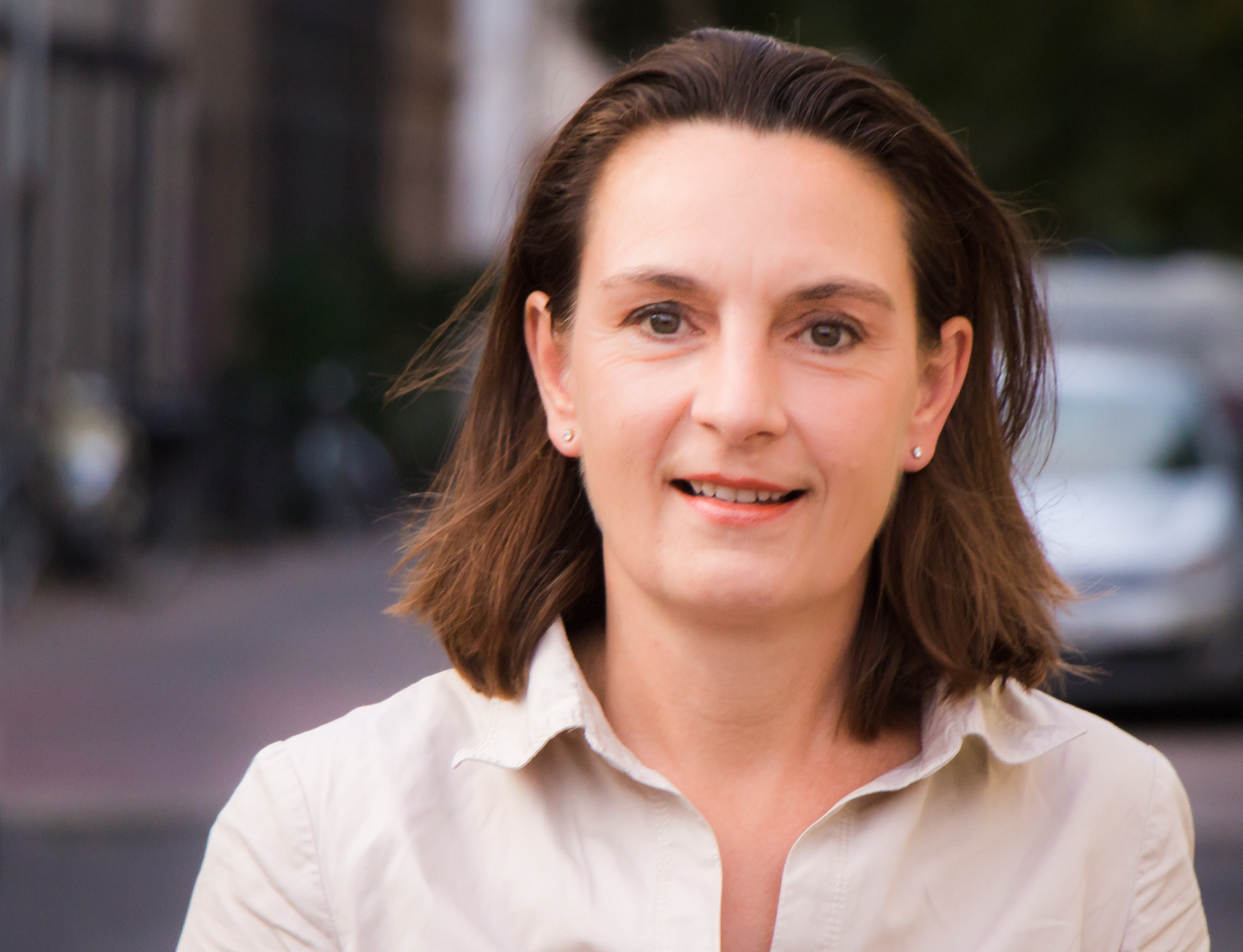
- Katja Terlau 2019
- Born: 29 April 1970 (age 56); Münster, Germany
- Education: University of Cologne

Katja Terlau (born 29 April 1970 in Münster) is a German art historian and provenance researcher. She was a co-initiator and founding member of the international Arbeitskreis Provenienzforschung in Germany, founded in 2000 and is considered a pioneer of German Provenance Research, which she entered after the Washington Principles on Nazi-Confiscated Art of 1998. Her main subject area is looted art; a number of museum holdings and large Jewish collections have been processed by her.

== Career ==
Terlau studied art history, history of archaeology and prehistory and early history at University of Münster and University of Cologne. There she completed her master's degree in art history and archaeology in 1995. In 1998 she received her doctorate from the University of Cologne with a dissertation entitled Die Hl. Kreuzkirche in Stromberg und ihre Stellung innerhalb der westfälischen Hallenkirchen. After working as a museum assistant at the Cologne Wallraf-Richartz-Museum from 1999 to 2000, she conducted research until 2003 as part of a project funded by the Sal. Oppenheim Foundation, she researched the provenances of all works of art acquired for the Wallraf-Richartz-Museum between 1933 and 1945. In 2001, in this context, she organised the internationale academic seminar Museen im Zwielicht – Ankaufspolitik 1933–1945 in Cologne.

Since 2003, Terlau has worked as a freelance art historian with provenance research and consultations for museums, foundations, private collections and the media. In this context, for example, in 2003/2004 she provided scientific advice for the film Das Erbe der Väter - wie der Otto Wolff arisch wurde in the WDR series Die Story im Ersten. Projects in the following years included provenance research on works of art owned by the Federal Republic of Germany (2009-2010), provenance investigation at the Museum Kunstpalast in Düsseldorf (2010-2015 with interruptions) as well as two projects of the Deutsches Zentrum Kulturgutverluste (Witten and Krefeld, 2015-2016). For the heirs of the art dealer Jacques Goudstikker, who had to flee Germany as a Jew in 1940, she and Clemens Toussaint's team located numerous objects in the collection and achieved their partial return.

In 2013, on behalf of the Research Centre for Degenerate Art at the Free University of Berlin, she examined the paintings and graphic works in the art collections of the city of Düsseldorf in order to identify the objects confiscated by the National Socialists in 1937.

From 2011 to 2013, together with Anja Heuß, she acted as spokesperson for the Provenance Research Working Group (Arbeitskreis Provenienzforschung e.V.), which she co-founded. In addition, she has been the initiator and moderator of the Provenance Research Working Group NRW since 2013. She was also a member of the advisory board of the Magdeburg Coordination Office at the German Centre for the Loss of Cultural Property from 2012 to 2014. In 2017, the Kunstmuseum Gelsenkirchen and the Museum Folkwang in Essen commissioned Terlau to investigate the acquisitions via the Hermann and Aenne Abels galleries from the period between 1933 and 1968.

Since the summer semester of 2015, Terlau has been a lecturer at the Art History Institute of the University of Cologne.

In 2018, she temporarily joined forces with Vanessa Voigt to form the art historical consultancy firm Terlau & Voigt. In 2019, the two researchers determined, among other things, the legality of the transfer of ownership of four Piet Mondrian paintings in the Kunstmuseen Krefel. The company was dissolved in autumn 2020. Since then, Terlau has returned to work as a freelance provenance researcher.

== Selected publications ==
Monographs

- Der Neubau des Kölner Wallraf-Richartz-Museums. Hefte des Wallraf-Richartz-Museum. Cologne. 2000.
- Die Hl. Kreuzkirche in Stromberg und ihre Stellung innerhalb der westfälischen Hallenkirchen. 66. Veröffentlichung der Abteilung Architekturgeschichte des Kunsthistorischen Instituts der Universität zu Köln. Cologne. 1998.

Articles

- Terlau, Katja (2000). "Die Chorkapellen des Kölner Doms und die westfälische Baukunst am Beispiel der Kirche zum Heiligen Kreuz in Stromberg. Eine vergleichende Bauuntersuchung". Wallraf-Richartz-Jahrbuch. LXI. Cologne: 7–22. JSTOR 24664391.
- Terlau, Katja (2001). Restitution des Gemäldes "Landschaft mit geborstener Brücke" nach Art des Meindert Hobbema aus der Sammlung Frederico Gentili di Giuseppe. Veröffentlichungen der Koordinierungsstelle für Kulturgutverluste. Magdeburg. pp. 186–193.
- Terlau, Katja (2001). "Das Wallraf-Richartz-Museum und seine Ankaufspolitik 1933–1945. Vorläufiger Forschungsbericht". Wallraf-Richartz-Jahrbuch. LXII: 277–292. JSTOR 24665306.
- Terlau, Katja; Strodthoff, Werner (2001). Wallraf-Richartz-Museum. Der Neubau. Architektur Oswald Mathias Unters. Darmstadt. pp. 387–393.
- Terlau, Katja (2007). "Das Wallraf-Richartz-Museum in der Zeit zwischen 1933-1945". Museen im Zwielicht – die eigene Geschichte. Tagungsband Köln und Hamburg. Veröffentlichungen der Koordinierungsstelle für Kulturgutverluste. 2 (31–49) (2nd ed.). Magdeburg. OCLC 888712518.
- Terlau, Katja (2005). "Hildebrand Gurlitt and the Art trade during the Nazi Period" (PDF). Vitalizing Memory. International Perspectives on Provenance Research. Washington: American Association of Museums. pp. 165–171. ISBN 9781933253022. LCCN 2005029287. OCLC 1357529370.
- Terlau, Katja; Senger, Nina (2005). "Methodik der Provenienzrecherche am Beispiel der Sammlung des Kunsthändlers Jacques Goudstikker, Amsterdam". AKMB News, Informationen zu Kunst, Museum und Bibliothek. 2: 27–32. OCLC 671867995.
- Terlau, Katja (2010). 10 Jahre "Arbeitskreis Provenienzforschung", Ein Erfahrungsbericht. Die Verantwortung dauert an. Beiträge deutscher Institutionen zum Umgang mit NS-verfolgungsbedingt entzogenem Kulturgut (Report). Veröffentlichungen der Koordinierungsstelle für Kulturgutverluste. Magdeburg. pp. 335–350.
- Terlau, Katja (2015). "Hildebrand Gurlitt (1895–1956) und sein Wirkungskreis in der NS-Zeit". In Heil, Johannes; Weber, Annette (eds.). Ersessene Kunst – Der Fall Gurlitt. Berlin: Johannes Heil und Annette Weber. pp. 19–36.
- Terlau, Katja (15 April 2017). "Annotierte Auktionskataloge aus der Zeit 1933–1945 im Kunsthistorischen Institut, Universität zu Köln, und der Kunsthändler Eduard Plietzsch (1886–1961)" (PDF). Art Market Studies. Cologne: Kunsthistorisches Institut, Universität zu Köln.
- Terlau, Katja (2017). "Hermann Haller (1880–1950). Von Begegnungen mit Menschen geleitet – Figuren und Porträts geformt". In Dascher, Ottfried; Shiner, Helen (eds.). Der Sprung in den Raum. Skulpturen bei Alfred Flechtheim. Wädenswil: Nimbus Verlag. pp. 219–247.
