= Hildebrand Gurlitt =

German art dealer authorized by Third Reich to sell looted art, historian

- Gurlitt photographed in 1944
- Born: 15 September 1895; Dresden, German Empire
- Died: 9 November 1956 (aged 61); Düsseldorf, West Germany
- Occupations: Art dealer and historian
- Known for: Art dealer during the Nazi era, war profiteering
- Spouse: Helene Hanke
- Children: Cornelius Gurlitt; Renate Gurlitt
- Parents: Cornelius Gurlitt; Marie Gurlitt
- Relatives: Wilibald Gurlitt (brother); Cornelia Gurlitt (sister); Wolfgang Gurlitt (cousin)

Hildebrand Gurlitt (15 September 1895 – 9 November 1956) was a German art historian and art gallery director who dealt in Nazi-looted art as one of Hitler's and Goering's four authorized dealers for "degenerate art".

A Nazi-associated art dealer and war profiteer, during the Nazi era Gurlitt traded in "degenerate art", purchasing paintings in Nazi-occupied France, many of them stolen, for Hitler's planned Führermuseum (which was never built) and for himself. He also inherited family artworks from both his father and his sister, an accomplished artist in her own right. Following World War II and the denazification process he became Director of the Art Association for the Rhineland and Westphalia, until his death in a car accident at the age of 61. His personal collection of over 1,500 artworks by Impressionist, Cubist, and Expressionist artists and Old Masters, remained virtually unknown until it was brought to public attention in 2013 following its confiscation from the possession of his son, Cornelius Gurlitt, who, although never reunited with the collection, bequeathed it upon his death in 2014 to the Museum of Fine Arts Bern in Switzerland.

== Early life ==
Gurlitt was born into an artistic family in Dresden in 1895. His father Cornelius Gurlitt (senior) was an architect and art historian, his brother Willibald a musicologist, his sister Cornelia a painter, and his cousin Wolfgang was an art dealer as well. His grandmother Elisabeth Gurlitt was Jewish, which would prove problematic under Nazi rule: he was considered a "quarter-Jew" under the Nuremberg laws. After completing his schooling, he showed an interest in art history and registered to study this subject at the Dresden Technical School, where his father was Chancellor; however, in 1914 World War I commenced and both Hildebrand and his elder brother Wilibald volunteered to join the German army of the day. Hildebrand served and was wounded at both the Somme and in Champagne, and later served as an army press officer in Vilnius and Kaunas in Lithuania, where he remained until 1919. Returning to a shattered Germany after demobilization, he was disillusioned with all aspects of war and politics and vowed henceforth to devote himself to art alone as an escape from politics, an irony which has not escaped subsequent biographers.

Gurlitt had a close relationship with his sister Cornelia (born 1890), who was an expressionist painter and was in contact with Marc Chagall. She also served in the First World War as a nurse and moved to Berlin shortly after the war. The lack of artistic recognition and depression led to her suicide in 1919; Gurlitt took care of her works, but part of it was destroyed by their mother after the death of their father.

Following the end of the war, Gurlitt resumed his studies in art history, first in Frankfurt, then Berlin, then in 1921 once again in Frankfurt, where he was awarded his doctorate in 1924 for a thesis on the Gothic architecture of St. Catherine's Church in Oppenheim. In 1923 he had married the ballet dancer Helene Hanke who was trained under expressionist dancer Mary Wigman. They later had two children, Rolf Nikolaus Cornelius, known as Cornelius (junior) (1932–2014) and Nicoline Benita Renate (originally known as Renate, later as Benita) (1935–2012).

== Early career ==
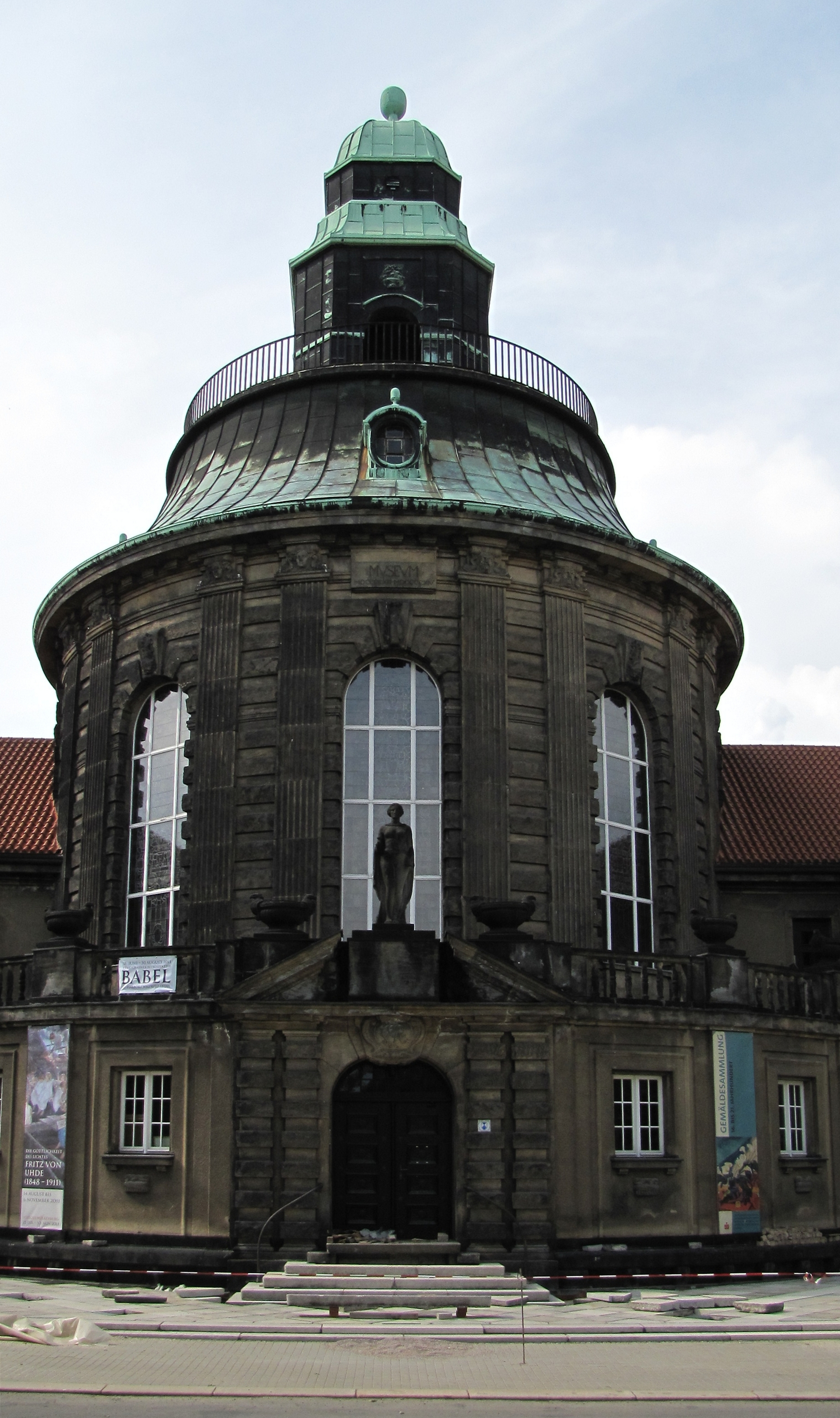
Museum in Zwickau

Between 1921 and 1924, Gurlitt contributed articles on art for newspapers, and following his graduation, he became the first director of the König Albert museum in Zwickau in 1925. One of the first exhibitions he organized at Zwickau was the October 1925 exhibition of Max Pechstein. Financially it was a success, but it generated a lot of hostility from local conservatives. In 1926 he contracted the Bauhaus Dessau for the design and decoration of the museum. Later on, he continued exhibiting contemporary art: in 1926 Käthe Kollwitz and a special exhibition on contemporary art in Dresden (Das junge Dresden), in 1927 Erich Heckel and Karl Schmidt-Rottluff, and in 1928 Emil Nolde. A collection of his letters shows that he was personally well acquainted with modern artists at the time, and he acquired and exhibited works by many of them, including Barlach, Feininger, Hofer, Kandinsky, Kirchner, Klee, Kokoschka, Lissitzky, Marc, and Munch. Gurlitt's work was appreciated by the national press and his peers, but the local press was less impressed. The city's financial difficulties and press campaigns against him led to his dismissal in 1930.

Following his dismissal Gurlitt moved to Hamburg, where he became the curator and managing director of the Kunstverein (Art Association) until he and the board members were forced to resign by the Nazis in 1933.

== Nazi era ==
From the mid 1930s onwards, Gurlitt purchased and, in some cases, onsold artworks, often bought for low prices, from private individuals, including Jewish owners who were under duress to pay extortionate taxes, or were otherwise liquidating assets in order to flee the country. On the one hand, he claimed he was helping the owners in their predicament since there were few dealers who were prepared to undertake such transactions. On the other hand, he was not averse to enriching himself in the process, nor was he averse to not supporting post-war claimants seeking to reclaim or obtain compensation for such works sold under duress.

Gurlitt was one of the four dealers appointed by the Nazi Commission for the Exploitation of Degenerate Art (together with Karl Buchholz, Ferdinand Möller, and Bernhard Böhmer) to market confiscated works of art abroad. Some 16,000 so-called "degenerate" artworks had been removed from museums and confiscated all over Germany. Some of these works were exhibited in the Degenerate Art Exhibition. A trading room was set up in Schönhausen Palace outside Berlin. The four dealers were allowed to buy pieces and sell them abroad, which they did not always report to the commission. Gurlitt's name appears against many of the entries on a listing compiled by the Ministry of Propaganda and now held by the Victoria and Albert Museum that provides details of the fate of each object, including whether it was exchanged, sold or destroyed.

Gurlitt used his position to sell art to domestic collectors as well, most notably to Bernhard Sprengel whose collection forms the core of the Sprengel Museum in Hannover. In 1936 Gurlitt was visited in Hamburg by Samuel Beckett.

During the Nazi occupation of France, Hermann Göring appointed a series of Reichsleiter Rosenberg Taskforce approved dealers, including Gurlitt, to acquire French art assets for Hitler's planned Führermuseum which he wanted to build in Linz; some of the works also went to swell Göring's personal art collection. In early 1943, Hermann Voss, director of Hitler's planned Führermuseum in Linz, named Gurlitt his official purchasing agent. Gurlitt, who had already embarked on purchasing trips to Paris on behalf of German Museums, purchased around 200 works in Paris and the Netherlands between 1943 and 1944, not including works acquired for his own collection, of which 168 were intended for the Führermuseum. Gurlitt undoubtedly used his thus "officially sanctioned" purchasing trips to Paris, which was at that time awash with artworks including old masters, of dubious provenance and including items now recognised as being looted, to further enrich his own holdings, and also became very wealthy from commissions on the enormous amounts of money being paid by Hitler's regime for artworks at that time. Gurlitt was, according to Dr. Katja Terlau, "one of the most important and active art dealers during the Nazi era."

== Post-war ==
Sworn Statement to the Allies by Dr. H. Gurlitt, 1945 (Translation)

Gurlitt List of confiscated works prepared by CCP Wiesbaden, 1950

Gurlitt was captured with his wife and twenty boxes of art in Aschbach (Schlüsselfeld) in June 1945. Under interrogation after capture, Gurlitt and his wife told United States Army authorities that in the fire bombing of Dresden of February 1945 much of his collection and his documentation of art transactions had been destroyed at his home in Kaitzer Strasse. One hundred and fifteen pieces taken from him by American and German authorities were returned to him after he had convinced them that he had acquired them lawfully. Among those were Lion Tamer by Max Beckmann and Self-Portrait by Otto Dix, which Gurlitt passed on to his son Cornelius. Gurlitt successfully presented himself to his assessors as a victim of Nazi persecution due to his Jewish heritage, and negotiated the release of his possessions. Whether or not portions of his collection and records of business transactions were destroyed in Dresden as Gurlitt claimed, additional portions apparently had been successfully hidden in Franconia, Saxony, and Paris, from which they were retrieved after the war.

By 1947, Gurlitt had resumed trading in art works and eventually in 1948–49 took up a position as Director of the Art Association for the Rhineland and Westphalia, based in Düsseldorf, which in 1949 was allocated space in the Düsseldorf art gallery in which to stage exhibitions. Over the next five years he staged over 70 exhibitions of leading modern artists and brokered the sale of paintings with at least some of the proceeds going to the Association, while at the same time dealing privately and purchasing works for his own collection, including Courbet's Village Girl with Goat for which he paid the then very large sum of 480,000 French Francs. He also lent works from his collection for several travelling exhibitions: one such show, "German Watercolors, Drawings and Prints: A Mid-Century Review" included 23 works from Hildebrand's collection and toured the United States up to and beyond his premature death at age 61 in a car crash in 1956. A year before his death, he prepared a six page manuscript preface for an exhibition catalogue which was, however, never printed; with one crucial page missing (covering his work for the Nazis), it survives in a Düsseldorf archive and provides a heavily sanitised personal review of his career to date and on some aspects of the history of his collection.

== Reputation and reappraisal ==
Gurlitt was generally successful at concealing his role in Nazi looting and ridding himself of Nazi-associated "taint" after the war. In postwar Germany, along with other dealers of Nazi-looted art, Gurlitt built a respectable career as an art association director and exhibition manager, art dealer, and collector. Upon his death, he was celebrated in German newspaper articles and speeches for his championing of modern art and its creators, and even had a street named after him in Düsseldorf. However, the declassification of military and intelligence archives beginning in the late 1990s and the discovery of a hoard of hidden artworks in the Munich home of his son have led to a well-documented reappraisal. Gurlitt is now viewed as "Hitler's art dealer" and a Nazi collaborator and profiteer, with no empathy for the Jewish victims of the Nazi regime from whom many of the artworks originated, whether procured for himself, traded, or purchased for his Nazi masters' collections. His role as one of the four official art dealers named by Göring and Hitler to trade in modern art (so-called Degenerate Art) has resurfaced. Gurlitt had claimed that he had "saved" many of the works from destruction, either by the Nazis, by allied bombardment or confiscation, or by further looting by the Soviets following the Allied liberation of Europe; although there is an element of truth in this, another driver was clearly his own personal enrichment, as well as ensuring his and his family's survival during the Nazi era and a desire to avoid military service. For critic James McAuley, writing in "Even" magazine after viewing the two recent public exhibitions of selected works from the collection, Gurlitt was a morally bankrupt and "dreadfully mediocre art dealer whose animating principle seems to have been profit and professional advancement" who "made his career in the arts, but without any real distinction", "swindled them all" and went on to state: "The art in Bonn and Bern adds up to a collection of no particular distinction, larded with trite, second-tier works on paper by artists of middling distinction, and the real, unexpected achievement of 'Status Report' is that it exposes the truth about Hildebrand Gurlitt – his mediocrity, his uncomplicated interiority, his utter predictability", although other commentators are much less dismissive about the collection's quality (see note). (Note: McAuley's argument is a little difficult to follow: if, for example, Gurlitt's collection had contained more "masterworks" in place of the many claimed "second-tier works on paper by artists of middling distinction", would that have made his acquisitions more or less culpable? In any case, other commentators were much less dismissive of the works contained, for example the artworks by his little known but talented sister Cornelia, together with "unexpected delights" by artists such as Heinrich Campendonk, Rolf Grossman and Max Liebermann, in addition to the more significant items in the collection by major artists (see Gurlitt Collection#Contents).)

Writing in 2018, Rebecca O'Dwyer says:

Hildebrand Gurlitt was a canny operator who, despite being part Jewish, managed not only to survive but to thrive in Nazi Germany. He achieved this through full cooperation: facilitating the sale of so-called "degenerate art" to (mostly) foreign buyers to buoy the regime's coffers, while also acquiring suitably völkisch art from Nazi-occupied countries for the planned Führer Museum in Linz. At the same time, Gurlitt made money siphoning off countless works for his own collection. Where the art came from, and the reason behind each individual sale – if the pieces were sold at all – did not really concern him. ... [In the 2017–2018 exhibitions] particular artworks are exhibited alongside case studies documenting their original owners, predominately Jewish people forced to sell their possessions, or whose homes were looted as they either fled or were murdered. These small family histories make fully apparent the horror on which Gurlitt's successful career was founded.

Author Catherine Hickley offered her own assessment of Gurlitt's actions in 2015:

He was an anti-Nazi who became corrupted by the regime he professed to hate; whose fear and ambition combined led him to compromise his own beliefs and, in the process, forfeit his integrity. ... What is most regrettable in Hildebrand's case is that despite his immense wealth, he never tried to make amends after the war when he could have done so without fear of repercussion. ... This perhaps more than anything else in his biography is a sign of how far the Nazis' inhumanity crept into the minds of those who lived under them.

== Survival of art collection ==
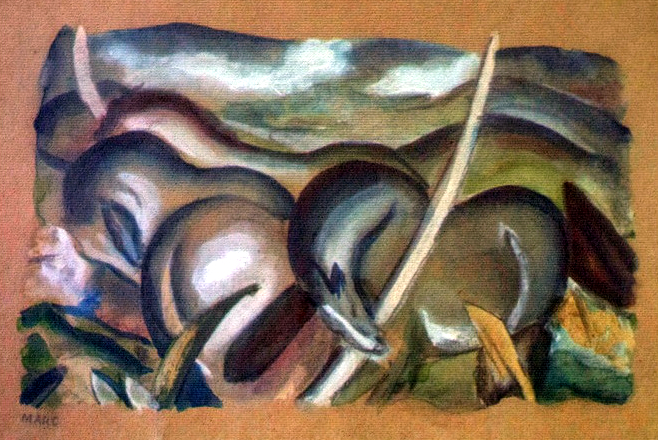
Franz Marc – Pferde in Landschaft (Horses in Landscape)

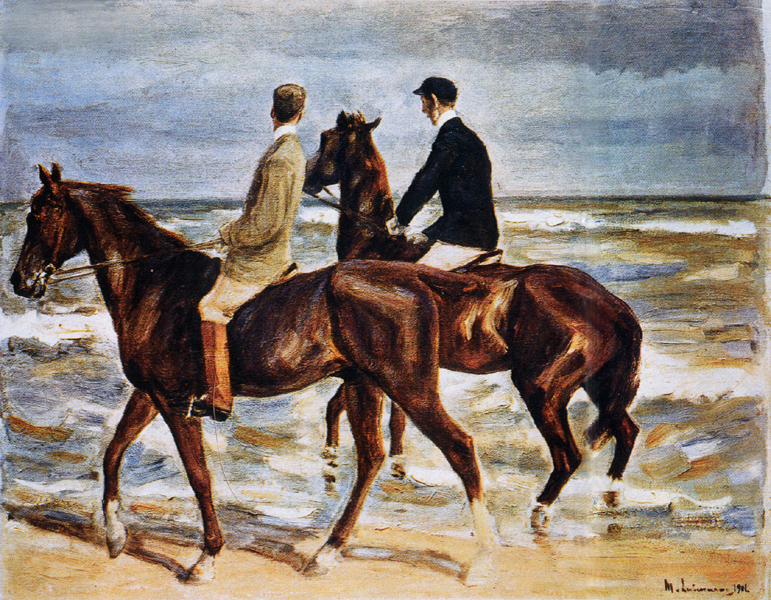
Max Liebermann's Two Riders On The Beach in the Gurlitt collection and now passed on to the descendants of the original Jewish owner

Far from being mostly lost in the war as Gurlitt had claimed, around 1,500 artworks remained in Gurlitt's possession at the time of his death, passing to his wife Helene and hence to their son Cornelius (with some to his sister Renate) following Helene's death in 1968. They remained in the younger generation of Gurlitts' possession for over four decades out of public knowledge, although Cornelius is known to have sold eleven works via the Galerie Kornfeld in Bern, Switzerland, in 1988, and possibly four others in 1990, as well as Max Beckmann's The Lion Tamer which sold at auction in 2011, with the proceeds split between Cornelius and a relative of the painting's original Jewish owners. Helene had earlier sold three paintings, including Picasso's Portrait of a Woman with Two Noses, via the auction house of Ketterer in Stuttgart in 1960, plus offered Bar, Brown by Max Beckmann, which failed to sell; Cornelius subsequently sold the same painting via Ketterer again in 1972. In 2007, August Macke's Woman with a Parrot, also with a Hildebrand Gurlitt provenance, was sold in Berlin via the auction house Villa Grisebach for €2 million; the seller was an unnamed German collector, suspected by investigative author Catherine Hickley to have been Cornelius' sister Renate (Benita).

On 22 September 2010, German customs officials at the German–Switzerland border found Cornelius, by then aged 77, to be carrying €9,000 in cash which he explained was money from the previous sale of a painting, which led to a search warrant in 2011 for his apartment in Schwabing, Munich. On 28 February 2012 officials from the Augsburg Prosecutors Office found 1,406 artworks, the bulk of Hildebrand's original collection, with a reported estimated worth (subsequently found to be greatly exaggerated) of €1 billion, which they then confiscated. Authorities initially banned reporting on the raid, which only came to light in 2013. Subsequently Cornelius' legally appointed custodian obtained an agreement that the collection be returned since there was no evidence that Cornelius had broken any German laws; however, nothing had been returned by the time of Cornelius' death. An additional portion of the collection was disclosed by Cornelius to his court-appointed lawyer to be stored at his residence in Salzburg, Austria, where he officially resided and was registered for tax purposes; these items remained in Cornelius' possession since the German authorities had no jurisdiction there. Cornelius, apparently aggrieved at the treatment he had received from the German authorities, bequeathed the entire collection on his death in 2014 to a small museum in Switzerland, the Museum of Fine Arts Bern, who in November 2014 agreed to accept the bequest, minus any works for which the possible status as wartime looted art was still in question. Exhibitions of some of the works from the collection went on show in November 2017.

== List of publications by Hildebrand Gurlitt ==
- Baugeschichte der Katharinenkirche in Oppenheim a. Rh. Frankfurt, Phil. Diss., 1924.
- Einführung und Begleittext zum Neudruck nach dem Exemplar in der Preußischen Staatsbibliothek von Peter Paul Rubens, Palazzi di Genova 1622, Berlin 1924. (online)
- Die Stadt Zwickau. Förster & Borries, Zwickau 1926.
- Aus Alt-Sachsen. B. Harz, Berlin 1928.
- Zu Emil Noldes Aquarellen. In: Die Kunst für alle. München 1929, S. 41. (online)
- Die Katharinenkirche in Oppenheim a. Rh. Urban-Verlag, Freiburg i. Br. 1930.
- Museen und Ausstellungen in mittleren Städten. In: Das neue Frankfurt, internationale Monatsschrift für die Probleme kultureller Neugestaltung, Frankfurt 1930, S. 146. (online)
- Neue englische Malerei. In: Die neue Stadt, internationale Monatsschrift für architektonische Planung und städtische Kultur, Frankfurt am Main 1933, S. 186. (online)
- Sammlung Wilhelm Buller. Kunstverein für die Rheinlande und Westfalen, Düsseldorf 1955.
- Richard Gessner. Freunde mainfränkischer Kunst und Geschichte, Würzburg 1955.

== See also ==
- Gurlitt Collection
- Cornelius Gurlitt (art collector)
- Wolfgang Gurlitt
- Karl Buchholz (Art dealer)
- Eberhard W. Kornfeld
- Ferdinand Moeller
- Degenerate art
- Nazi plunder
- Führermuseum
- List of claims for restitution for Nazi-looted art

== Bibliography ==
- Hickley, Catherine. "The Munich Art Hoard: Hitler's Dealer and his Secret Legacy." Thames & Hudson, London, 2015, 272 pp. ISBN 9780500292570
- Ronald, Susan. "Hitler's Art Thief: Hildebrand Gurlitt, the Nazis, and the Looting of Europe's Treasures." St. Martin's Press, New York, 400 pp. ISBN 9781250061096
- Collins, Jacob R. "The Gurlitt Trove: Its Past, Present and Future." Undergraduate Thesis, University of Vermont, 2016, 54 pp. Available online at https://scholarworks.uvm.edu/cgi/viewcontent.cgi?article=1035&context=castheses
- Kunstmuseum Bern (2017). Gurlitt Status Report: "Degenerate Art" - Confiscated and Sold (Exhibition Guide). Bern: Kunstmuseum Bern. https://www.kunstmuseumbern.ch/admin/data/hosts/kmb/files/page_editorial_paragraph_file/file_en/1369/ausstellungsfuehrer_bestandsaufnahme-gurlitt_e.pdf?lm=1509549566
- Kunstmuseum Bern (2018). Gurlitt Status Report Part 2: Nazi Art Theft and its Consequences (Exhibition Guide). Bern: Kunstmuseum Bern. https://www.kunstmuseumbern.ch/admin/data/hosts/kmb/files/page_editorial_paragraph_file/file_en/1398/ausstellungsfuehrer_gurlitt-teil2_en.pdf?lm=1524134409
