= Ferdinand Möller =

German Nazi art dealer

- Born: 15 October 1882; Münster, Westphalia, Prussia, Germany
- Died: 12 January 1956 (aged 73); Cologne, North Rhine-Westphalia, German Federal Republic (West Germany)
- Occupations: Bookshop assistant Art dealer Gallery owner Specialist publisher
- Spouse: Maria Möller-Garny (1886–1971)
- Children: 1. Susanne Wenzel-Möller (1913–2003); 2. Rosemarie Möller/Baumgart (1915–2000); 3. Angelika Fessler-Möller (1919–2002)
- Parents: Ferdinand Möller (father); Wilhelmine Bürndick (mother)

Ferdinand Möller (15 October 1882 - 12 January 1956) was one of Hitler's Nazi art dealers specialized in selling looted "Degenerate art".

A high-profile German art dealer and gallery owner, Möller's career was at its height through the years of the German Republic. After 1933, being neither Jewish nor among those identified by the party as a government opponent, he remained a leading figure in the German arts world, although the nature of the arts business was transformed during the Hitler years: in or soon after 1937 Möller was obliged to end his involvement with organising art exhibitions. He remained active as an art dealer of traditional and modern works throughout his life. In 1938 Möller became one of four leading art dealers mandated to dispose of art works confiscated in the context of the government's campaign against so-called degenerate art. Many sources assert or imply that he found opportunities to interpret his mandate and /or to enrich himself unreasonably while undertaking this work for the government: details remain hard to pin down, however.

== Life ==
=== Provenance and early years ===
Ferdinand Möller was born at Münster, the first-born of his parents' six children. His father, also called Ferdinand Möller, was a master builder and stonemason with his own successful business in the town. It is not known why, as the eldest son, Möller did not simply follow his father into the building trade. Instead, after leaving school in 1897, he embarked at once on a three-year apprenticeship in the books business, starting out on his apprenticeship with a book dealer at Hamm, half an hour to the south of Münster by train. He then worked, between 1900 and 1903, at Limburg an der Lahn, further to the south, employed by the publishing firm of "Heinrich-August-Herz-Verlag". That was followed by three months in Karlsruhe where he worked at the venerable "Braunsche Hofbuchhandlung" (bookshop), before moving further south to the francophone western part of Switzerland. Between October 1904 and February 1906 he was employed at another long-established book shop, the "Librairie Schlesinger" in Vevey, at the eastern end of the lake. It appears that he then moved on the Athens, working from March 1906 at another well-regarded bookshop, the "Librairie Constantin Eleftheroudakis". During or before 1907 he returned to Germany, working in the Bavarian capital till 1910 at the "Ackermann und Schüler" publishing and book trading business.

=== Marriage and a change in career ===
Ferdinand Möller married the painter Maria Garny (1886–1971) at Cologne in 1912. The couple's three daughters were born in 1913, 1915 and 1919. 1912 was also the year in which Möller redefined his professional future with a decision to exchange book dealing for dealing. The decision arose, or at least became apparent, after his visit to the 1912 "Sonderbund-Ausstellung" (exhibition), the fourth in a brief series of annual modern art exhibitions - held in 1912 in Cologne - that had a deep impact on many art lovers between 1909 and 1912 (and subsequently). He now moved to Dresden, widely regarded as Germany's arts capital, to take a position at Ludwig Gutbier's "Arnold Gallery" ("Galerie Arnold"). In 1909 Gutbier had opened a new branch of the gallery in Breslau (as Wrocław was known till) 1944/45) and in 1913 Ferdinand Möller transferred to the Silesian capital to take charge at the new "Arnold Gallery" branch there. He remained with the "Arnold Gallery" in Breslau till 1917, which was the year in which he opened his own gallery there. Despite the war, which had been under way since 1914, he was able to stage an opening exhibition of paintings by Lovis Corinth, Anselm Feuerbach, Max Liebermann, Max Slevogt and Wilhelm Trübner: works of sculpture by Alfred Helberger also featured.

=== Berlin ===
In 1918, Möller took over from Erich Schall as "Geschäftsführer" (loosely, "Administrative Director") (Note: The term "Geschäftsführer" is normally translated in English as "Chief Executive Officer" / CEO or "Managing Director" / MD; but in the case of the Freie Secession gallery, created a few years earlier by around 50 artists from in and around Berlin, it seems unlikely that Möller enjoyed the level of power and influence associated with the terms CEO and MD in more conventional private sector businesses.) at the Freie Secession gallery in Berlin. That year he opened his own "Galerie Ferdinand Möller" at Potsdamer Straße 134c, previously the home of novelist Theodor Fontane until his death in 1898. In October 1919 he added a "Verlag Galerie Ferdinand Möller" (publishing operation) to his gallery business. His gallery in Breslau, meanwhile, held an exhibition devoted to the works of Karl Hofer in March 1920 and was then closed down.

He teamed up with the collector Wilhelm Valentiner in 1923 to stage an exhibition of German contemporary Art at the American Art Association-Anderson Galleries in New York City. "A Collection of Modern German Art" was the first significant exhibition of German art to be held in New York since the ending of the First World War six years earlier. For Möller the exhibition involved a stay of several months in New York

During 1923/1924 Ferdinand Möller relocated with his family, gallery and publishing operation from central Berlin to Potsdam, a short distance outside the capital. It appears that this move coincided with a decision to devote more time to earlier passions of book collecting, and to publishing books on art, apparently at the expense of art dealing and exhibiting. There are also indications that he had become exhausted by five years of intense activity between 1917 and 1923 and was hoping to lead a quieter life and spend more time with his young family. As far as his public profile at the time was concerned, however, it was as a Berlin art dealer that Möller continued to be known, and there are indications that he continued to work as an art dealer for appropriately discerning and affluent private customers. Meanwhile, he remained exceptionally well-network with the Berlin arts establishment. His daughter would later recall that frequent visitors to the family home included Hans Poelzig, Ernő Kállai, Will Grohmann, Edwin Redslob, Max Kaus, the publisher Eduard Stichnote and the Noldes.

=== Political shadows ===
In 1927, the Gallery Ferdinand Möller returned to the heart of Berlin, now located at Schöneberger Ufer 38, (Note: The street numbers changed later. Today the building is at Schöneberger Ufer 78.) close to the Potsdamer Bridge. The family continued to live in Potsdam till 1930, however. During the later 1920s, with the return of intensified austerity, political and social tensions were intruding into daily life and spilling onto the city streets with growing frequency. Within and beyond the arts world a polarising rivalry was emerging between "French art" and "German art", encouraged by popularist organisations such as the "Kampfbund für deutsche Kulturwurden" ("Fighting League for German cultural values"). Behind it all stood the National Socialist Party which had been steadily gaining support since 1924, and which in 1930 became the second largest party in parliament. As an art dealer, it might be thought that Ferdinand Möller had no reason to participate in the "French art and German art" debates, and before 1927 he never showed much sign of being interested in politics. In November 1927 he nevertheless published an article under the title "Who is responsible" in the mass-circulation (and by now increasingly shrill) Deutsche Allgemeine Zeitung (newspaper). It is not known whether he provided the piece at the invitation of the newspaper, or contributed it unsolicited. The "artistic views" shared with readers of the article were uncompromisingly nationalistic, while the syntax employed was heavy with the bombast more familiar to students of the nationalist politics of Europe during the 1930s. The article stands out because neither the tone nor the forthright opinions are representative of Ferdinand Möller's later views, any more than they were adumbrated by his words or actions during his life up till that point. How it found its way into the newspaper remains something of a mystery, but it may very well have provided the writer with some valuable political capital six years later, when the Hitler government took power.

In 1929 there was a particularly important exhibition at the Schöneberger Ufer Gallery Ferdinand Möller, devoted to works by the "Blue four", Paul Klee, Lyonel Feininger, Wassily Kandinsky und Alexej Jawlensky, three of them leading representatives of Bauhaus art and all four of them - despite Möller's nationalistic outpourings in his 1927 Deutsche Allgemeine Zeitung article - born outside Germany. Both this exhibition and Möller's 1930 "Vision und Formgesetz" ("Vision and the laws of form") drew great attention a what was widely seen as a high point of German modernist art. Möller himself had become one of the most important art dealers for "1920s German modern" work. The Gallery Ferdinand Möller relocated in 1932 and again in 1935, but during this period it continued to operate from prestigious premises in the heart of Berlin.

=== Dicing with Hitler ===
As parliamentary deadlock persisted and political polarisation intensified, in January 1933 the National Socialists took power and in the space of a few months transformed Germany into a one-party dictatorship. Between 4 July and early October 1933, Möller allowed the party Student Union to use his gallery for their exhibition of "30 German artists". The decisive factor in persuading the NS student to work with Möller was Möller's very public support for "German art" in his 1927 Deutsche Allgemeine Zeitung article and his resulting reputation as a conservative-nationalist art dealer. Extracts from the article were indeed quoted in (both versions of) the exhibition catalogue. In reality, the organisation of the exhibition seems to have been from the outset a collaboration between Möller and the National Socialist students. Works to be shown came both from young artists and from well-established representatives of German expressionism, but virtually all of the artists represented were still alive.

Möller clearly hoped that by combining "classical modernism" with "contemporary art" the exhibition presented by the party's own student members would have a public impact that would effectively trump the rising tide of opposition to "modernism in art" from within the party. In the event the exhibition quickly triggered an intense power struggle between the party's students and the "art-traditionalist racial purists" of Alfred Rosenberg's "Kampfbund für deutsche Kulturwurden". On 4 July 1933, the exhibition's scheduled opening was accompanied by a large rally of supportive National Socialist Students which generated extensive press coverage and public interest. The ministry now intervened to ban the exhibition on the grounds that it included works by Ernst Barlach and Emil Nolde, both well-known opponents of "Nazism". After a frantic exchange of telegrams and other documents the ministry agreed to the conditional opening of the exhibition, which took place, formally, on 22 July 1933. The principal conditions stipulated were the withdrawal of the party Student Union from organising the exhibition and the exclusion of works by Barlach and Nolde. A new version of the exhibition catalogue was quickly produced from which all references to the involvement of the National Socialist Students' Union were expunged, and in which greater emphasis was placed on Möller's 1927 "German Art newspaper paean"; but the works of Barlach and Nolde remained, and in most respects, apart from its deferred opening, the "30 German artists" exhibition went ahead as originally conceived. Indeed, a (briefer) version of the "30 German artists" exhibition became an annual summer fixture at the gallery till 1937.

The "30 German artists" exhibition of 1933 can be seen as a battle won on behalf of contemporary art, but over the course of the twelve Hitler years it is hard to discern any equivalent public victory in the longer term. In 1937 Ferdinand Möller's involvement in art exhibitions came to an end: his continuing activity as an art dealer between 1937 and 1945 took place, even more than before, "under the radar", at least in terms of accessible surviving sources. Because of his social position and his good contacts inside the Propaganda Ministry and his quiet but extensive networking of many years with other party insiders, it seems reasonable to infer that Möller never felt the need to fear "personal sanctions" by government authorities. Certainly he never felt the need to abandon his personal commitment to German expressionist art.

Ferdinand Möller had acquired a second piece of building land in Potsdam as early as 1923, apparently intending to build a suitably stylish family home on it at some stage in the future. During the early 1930s necessary plans had been drawn up and necessary permissions obtained from the municipality, the most recent dated 1936. However, in 1937/38 it was not in Potsdam but at Zermützel (Neuruppin), a lakeside village in the flatlands north of Berlin, that Möller had a modern country "summer home" constructed. The finished building resembles something between as modernist villa and a very large bungalow. It was designed and its construction was overseen by Hans Scharoun who would become better known, after 1960, as the architect of the Berliner Philharmonie concert hall. The interior incorporates an abundance of well-lit wall-space. The house survives and has been maintained and used for appropriately art-related purposes, since 1995, by the "Ferdinand Möller foundation", which recently issued an invitation to artists to stay in it.

=== Degenerate art and the war years ===
Government leaders became increasingly preoccupied during the middle 1930s with what they characterised as the problem of "degenerate art". German modernist art - much of it the work of well-known and internationally admired artists - was removed from state-owned museums and other public buildings on the grounds that it was an "insult to German feeling" because un-German, Jewish, and/or "communist". Although the resulting campaign lasted for at least five years, most of the major art works affected had been identified and removed by the end of 1938. That left the government with thousands of artworks to dispose of: some of it might turn out to be valuable on the international art markets irrespective of its perceived degeneracy in the eyes of the government. Four leading art dealers expert in the field were selected to deal with the problem. Ferdinand Möller was one of the four. The other three were Karl Buchholz, Hildebrand Gurlitt and Bernhard Böhmer. The men were instructed to sell the art works on the international market, obtaining the best prices they could, and accounting to the government for the resulting foreign currency receipts. It is not clear what instructions, if any, they received concerning the disposal of works for which no international buyers could be found. Although they were naturally entitled to charge a commission for their trouble, troubling rumours surfaced that not all the commissions earned were being properly recorded and accounted for. There were, in addition, accusations that Möller had failed to ensure that all the "degenerate art works" were removed from Germany, but had instead sold a significant number to collectors resident in Germany or, in some cases, acquired them for himself. Equivalent accusations and assumptions quickly also surfaced and have persisted in respect of the other three eminent art dealers involved: all four would no doubt have insisted that preserving important art works was far more important than following the letter of the deluded instructions from the government.

By around 1942 Ferdinand Möller seems to have drawn back from the art market, unlike Gurlitt and Böhmer who seem to have been dealing more actively than ever. However, very little of Möller's correspondence from the period 1942 till 1944 has been accessed by scholars, giving rise to suspicions in some quarters that the available records may still not be complete in respect of his business activities during the period. Till 1943 Möller continued to sell to private collectors paintings that had come into his possession through the degenerate art programme where appropriate opportunities presented themselves, in defiance of the condition laid down by the government that works of "degenerate art" that had come his way since 1938 should only be sold abroad, and in exchange for foreign currency, but apparently he felt no need to fear prosecution for the breach. In November 1943 his galleries in Berlin where much of the art was stored were badly damaged by enemy bombing, after which even these sales to "domestic customers" seem to have come to an end. Earlier that same year, as the American bombing of Berlin increased, Möller moved out of the city to the summer bungalow-villa at Zermützel, accompanied by his wife and daughter Susanne along Susanne's her two children. The youngest daughter, Angelika, stayed on in Berlin, living at what remained of the gallery in Kluckstraße, to which Möller had relocated the focus of his business activities back in 1939. The middle daughter, Rosemarie, remained with her family far to the west, in the Black Forest region, where she had lived since her marriage in 1938. In 1943 the house at Zermützel was extended on one side in order to accommodate Susanne and the children. Möller had also taken to Zermützel as many as possible of the surviving art works that remained in his care at the time. As for most German families during the closing months of the war, the priority was on finding enough food and heating fuel to keep the family alive. Whatever Möller's preoccupations during this period, they may not have included much that concerned art dealing.

=== Soviet occupation zone ===
There are no surviving written records from Ferdinand Möller or anyone else of how he experienced the arrival, in the Neuruppin area, of the Red army as they made their way towards Berlin during the early months of 1945. In May 1945 war ended, and during the next couple of months the central third of Germany, including Zermützel and the eastern part of Berlin, were placed under military administration as the Soviet occupation zone. With the war over, Möller did record the horror he experienced when he drove to the rubble piles that a few months earlier had been Berlin. The entire front section of his own premises had been blown away during the final days of fighting in the city and were probably, as he wrote to a friend, beyond repair, although some rooms at the back of the building, including what had been the bedroom, were largely untouched by the destruction of war. In Zermützel the atmosphere was in many ways unexpectedly relaxed, despite the omnipresence of Russian soldiers: the "artistic atmosphere" of the family home seems to have dissuaded the soldiers for the robbery and looting widely reported elsewhere. In a letter addressed to the artist Joachim Utech (who had ended up in one of the western zones) Möller wrote reassuringly that the artworks were safe because the Soviet armed forces had placed the entire house under "museum protection". Maria Möller-Garny was soon kept busy painting portraits of the Russian military, which gave the family a special status with the occupying authorities locally. Möller nevertheless wrote in letters to friends of the intense loneliness and isolation that he felt in his village home hear the shores of the Tetzensee (lake). As early as 1945, but even more in 1946, he became a prolific letter writer, re-establishing contact with former customers, collectors and colleagues. Not infrequently, when writing to contacts in Switzerland or North America, he included in his letters requests for food parcels and other basic supplies. In doing this, he invariably included an offer to pay with artworks, reviving a habit he had first adopted when making equivalent requests during his self-imposed "professional exile" in Potsdam, between 1924 and 1927.

Throughout 1945 and 1946, Möller's impatience to re-establish his art gallery in central Berlin permeates his correspondence. During the later 1940s this was replaced by a growing resignation and recognition that the world - and especially Berlin - had changed for ever, and that the revival of his own position as a dominating figure in a version of the arts establishment that had existed before the war was never going to happen. Meanwhile, the curiously shadowy nature of his political networking before 1945 enabled him to present himself simply as a victim of the National Socialist nightmare. Apparently it never occurted to him that he might consider applying for the denazification procedure on his own account, though he was solicitous in securing an "Unbedenklichkeitsbescheinigung"(loosely, "clearance certificate") on behalf of a son-in-law. He now let it be known that in 1937 he had been obliged to withdraw from organising art exhibitions in his elegant Berlin gallery because he had refused to exclude the works of Jewish artists. Although the assertion may very well have contained a germ of truth, it was very far removed from the way in which the matter had been presented at the time. In 1937 the driving issue had been Möller's defiant commitment to promoting - and later to preserving - German expressionist art: it was a commitment in respect of which, to judge by subsequently discovered details of the art collections acquired by leading members of the Hitler government, he always had powerful allies behind the scenes. At the end of 1946 Möller wrote a remarkable letter to the National Administration for People's Education in the Soviet occupation zone. In it he "sought to set the record straight", explaining that the sale of the unwanted "degenerate art" under the Hitler government had originated as his own idea. A previous proposal which he said he had submitted to the Propaganda Ministry to sell all the "between 3 and 10,000" works by German and foreign artists to "the Americans" as a single job lot had, he explained, been turned down. Then, he went on, he had tried to explain how degenerate art works removed from public buildings were already finding their way onto international art markets. It would surely be better if the art works were sold on behalf of the state, and the foreign currency proceeds directed appropriately. The letter continued with a series of implausible but in the short term unverifiable assertions and half-truths, and the entire disposal operation developed out of the discussions that ensued. The letter to the national education department is easy to dismiss as the devious literary fictions of a consummate truth twister, but under conditions of post-war destruction and instability, whereby Möller had good reason to fear for his life and the lives of other family members, and at as time when he was also fighting for his property, his future and his reputation, he was far from unusual in resorting to this level of falsification.

His wider correspondence also makes clear that during the later 1940s Ferdinand Möller still had art works available for sale, although a complete inventory of the works he held at Zermützel does not exist and may never have been compiled. Nor is it easy to determine the overall extent of the holding from those correspondence that has been studied. He seems to have been under the impression - which may have been correct under criteria frequently encountered in the Soviet occupation zone - that all debts had been paid off or cancelled in the aftermath of a war in which millions of people had died, meaning that the art works in his possession were, almost by definition, his to dispose of as he wished. Letters from the time that have been found indicate a series of discrete one-to-one offers to selected collectors already included on the Möller contacts-list.

Ferdinand Möller's first gallery-style exhibition in nearly ten years took place in August 1946. The location was the recently renamed Karl Marx House in Neuruppin. 120 art works were on display, but none was for immediate sale to exhibition visitors. For Möller the purpose was to re-establish a presence. The focus was on works which, under National Socialism, had been disallowed from public display. Artists to be featured included Barlach, Feininger, Heckel, Hofer, Kirchner, Kollwitz, Kokoschka, Pechstein, Rohlfs and Schmidt-Rottluff. Although the "Free German Art" exhibition was opened by Trude Marx, the lady-major of Neuruppin, the principal target audience was not the townsfolk and countryfolk of Neuruppin and the surrounding flatlands, but rather the city folk including, crucially, the press, from Berlin half an hour to the south. Press releases announcing the exhibition were issued in good time to a number of Berlin newspapers, and transport from central Berlin was organised for members of the press with time and inclination to meet up at 09.30 by the Tiergarten Park in the city centre, and not to be returned to Berlin till some point during the afternoon. The press release referred to a catalogue for the exhibition which would be made available as soon as it could be produced. As soon as it had been produced, it was widely distributed. Recipients included many people who lived much too far away to attend the exhibition even if they had wanted to, but as a device for giving notice that Möller was back and had access to worthwhile artworks, the exhibition served its intended purpose very well. Press reaction was enthusiastic both in the short term and in terms of a series of more scholarly commentaries and reviews appearing in specialist journals during the months that followed. A market in art works returned little by little to Berlin and Möller engaged actively in the city's cautiously emerging arts establishment, but evidently he never became as well networked in the Soviet occupation zone as he had made himself in Germany between 1918 and 1945.

=== Pressures from the past ===
There was a serious falling out with his former employer, Ludwig Gutbier, over three important paintings that Möller had transferred to Gutbier - at the time in Munich - during 1944 for ongoing sale with a commission. A lengthy series of misunderstandings between the two men over the timings and amounts of payments due between them following the confiscation by the American military authorities in Munich of two of the three paintings. There were other squabbles with other dealers. For a younger generation of aspiring Berlin art dealers, he was no longer as "essential insider". The business with the "degenerate art" might or might not have made him exceptionally rich: no one quite knew. But it seems to have generated significant mistrust. From his correspondence it becomes clear that as early as 1946 Möller know it would be difficult for him to re-establish himself as a significant gallery owner in Berlin, while the necessary repairs to the destroyed front section of his existing premises in Berlin had yet to be tackled. Meanwhile, his contacts with dealers beyond the Berlin bubble, whether in Dresden to the south or Bielefeld to the west, were more friendly, relaxed and, in some cases, revealing of his situation and feelings at the time.

On 21 July 1949, facing the risk of the possible confiscation of his entire collection, as the Soviet authorities seemed to be taking an increasing interest in his involvement with the disposing of the National Socialists' unwanted "degenerate art" (and with Berlin still reeling in the aftermath of the Berlin Blockade"Soviet blockade" traumas) Ferdinand Möller managed to cross over with his family from the Soviet zone to the British zone. They made their new home in Cologne. Moving people between the Soviet zone and the western zones ("West Germany") during this period was very much easier than moving goods. Nevertheless, between the middle of 1949 and, at the latest, July 1950, various art works were taken by truck to Potsdam, where the Möller still owned a property. Details of where the paintings were ultimately moved to are in many cases unclear, but most of the art works and household effects in Möller's possession when he lived in Zermützel seem to have made the journey to West Berlin without significant confiscation or other loss. (Note: During 1949 all four of the military occupation zones were relaunched and rebranded as East Germany (October 1949) and West Germany (May 1949). Inside the city the divisions on the map between what the residents still thought of as the Soviet military sector and the three western military sectors was beginning to be replicated with physical barriers. Nevertheless, for those who knew the city, it was still easy enough to pass between what subsequently became the two halves of the divided city, East and West Berlin.) At the time when he crossed to the west had nevertheless already suffered major losses at Dresden and at Halle when pictures that he had sent for exhibition and possible sale were spotted by art lovers among the Soviet administrators and unceremoniously confiscated, ostensibly due to suspicions as to their wartime provenance.

=== Cologne ===
In 1951 Ferdinand Möller opened his gallery at Hahnenstraße 11, close to the university and a ten-minute walk from the city centre. Cologne, like Berlin, had been in large part destroyed by the bombing, and the building in which Möller installed his gallery was a new one, designed by Wilhelm Riphahn, one of the city's twentieth century architects. During the next four years the gallery presented a succession of successful exhibitions featuring not just German impressionist artists from the "Weimar" years, but also classical warks, along with exhibitions of works by well-regarded contemporary artists who were still very much alive, such as Ernst Wilhelm Nay, Hans Uhlmann and Fritz Winter.

Ferdinand Möller himself, by this time aged 73, died in a Cologne hospital in January 1956 and the gallery was closed down shortly afterwards.

== Ferdinand Möller archive ==
The Ferdinand Möller archive, consisting of large numbers of papers gifted by Angelika Fessler-Möller in 1984, is housed at the Berlinische Galerie (museum).

== Ferdinand Möller foundation ==
During the decade following reunification, starting in 1994, four paintings that had been on display at the Kunstmuseum Moritzburg Halle (Saale), having been confiscated from Möller in the late 1940s were returned to his youngest daughter, Angelika Fessler-Möller (1919–2002). She reacted by teaming up, in 1995, with the art dealer Wolfgang Wittrock to create the Berlin-based Ferdinand Möller foundation. The foundation is funded, in part, from the restoration and sale of certain paintings formerly owned by the art dealer Ferdinand Möller. It applies the capital gains generated through the increase in the value of its paintings to promoting research in the fields of German expressionist art as well as on National Socialist strategy for culture and the arts. It also supports the documentation of art works identified as "degenerate" and removed from German public collections in and directly after 1937.

== See also ==
- Hildebrand Gurlitt
- Karl Buchholz (Art dealer)
- List of claims for restitution for Nazi-looted art
