= Alfred Flechtheim =

German Jewish art dealer, art collector, journalist and publisher

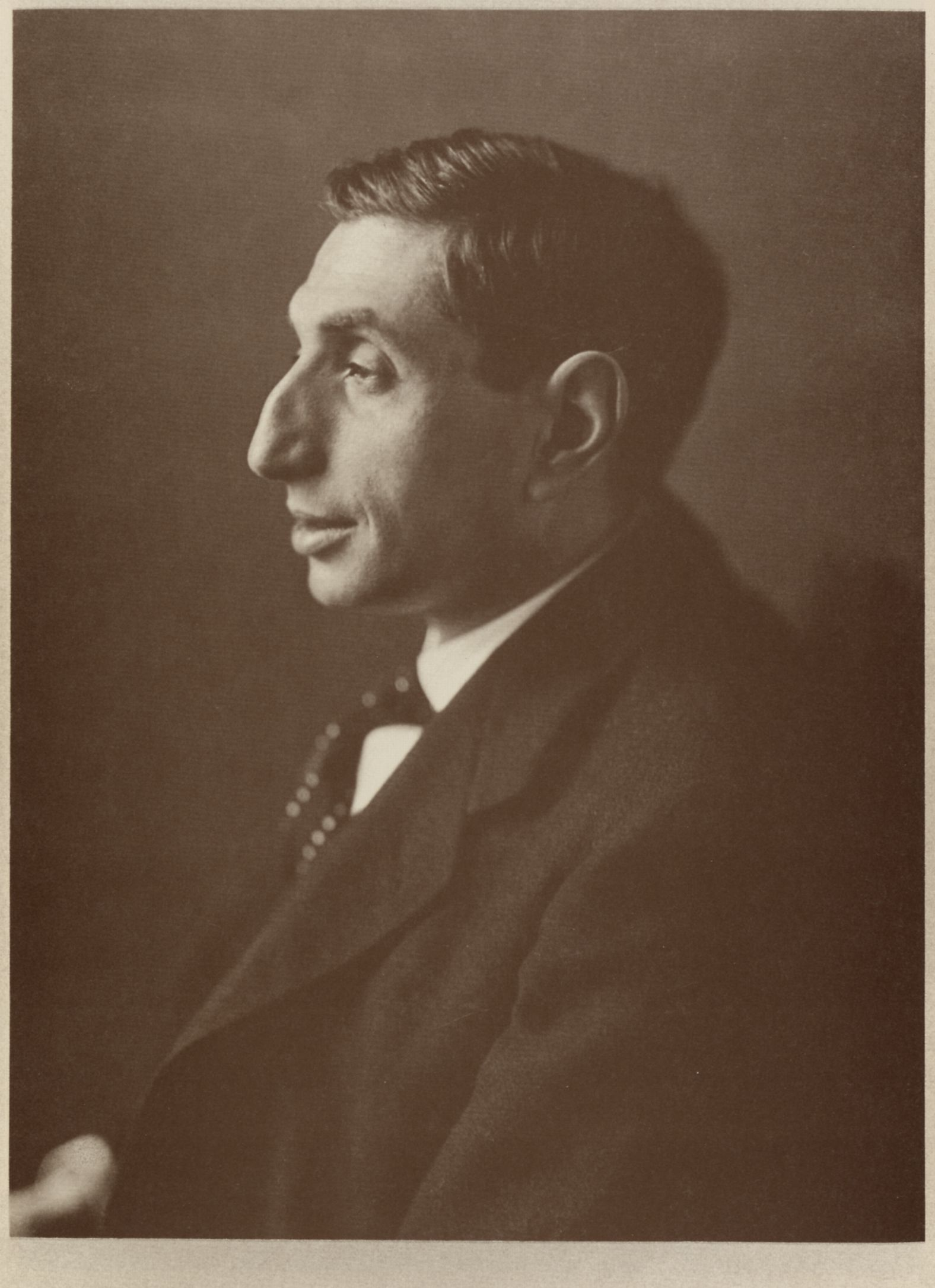
- Photograph by Jacob Hilsdorf (1910)
- Born: 1 April 1878; Münster, Westphalia, German Empire
- Died: 9 March 1937 (aged 58); London, England
- Occupation: Art dealer
- Spouse: Betty Goldschmidt (m. 1910)

Alfred Flechtheim (1 April 1878 – 9 March 1937) was a German Jewish art dealer, art collector, journalist and publisher persecuted by the Nazis.

== Early years ==
Flechtheim was born into a Jewish merchant family; his father, Emil Flechtheim, was a grain dealer. Alfred became a partner in his father's company after business internships in London and Paris.

== Art collector ==
Flechtheim appeared in the art world shortly after 1900, with a collection of paintings by Vincent van Gogh, Paul Cézanne; French Avant garde early works of Pablo Picasso, Georges Braque and André Derain; paintings of Wassily Kandinsky, Maurice de Vlaminck, Alexej von Jawlensky, Gabriele Münter, and the Rhein Expressionists Heinrich Campendonk, August Macke, Heinrich Nauen, and Paul Adolf Seehaus.

== 1912 Sonderbund in Cologne ==
Flechtheim organised The 'Internationale Kunstausstellung des Sonderbunds Westdeutscher Kunstfreunde und Künstler' that opened in Cologne on 25 May 1912. Known as the Sonderbund, the exhibition brought together all avant-garde groups of artists and art movements in Europe (Expressionism, The Brücke, The Blauer Reiter, Fauvism, Cubism) for the first time. Flechtheim was the chairman of the steering committee and the lender of many important artworks by Picasso and other artists.

== Art dealer ==
Flechtheim opened his first gallery in Düsseldorf in 1913, followed by galleries in Berlin, Frankfurt, Cologne, and Vienna. Flechtheim served in the German Army during World War I, but not at the front. His art business collapsed during the war but he re-opened in Düsseldorf in 1919. Legendary, glamorous parties in Flechtheim's gallery overflowed with the glitterati of the new Berlin: movie stars, titans of finance, prizefighters and artists of every stripe.

He founded the important modernist art journal Der Querschnitt (The Cross Section) which ran from 1921 until 1936.

== Flechtheim, Nazis and Aryanization ==
As soon as the Nazis came into power, in 1933, Flechtheim was persecuted and his business attacked. In 1933, Nazi Sturmabteilung men broke up an auction of Flechtheim's paintings. In March 1933, an art dealer named Alexander Vömel, a member of the SA or Brown Shirts, confiscated Flechtheim's Düsseldorf gallery. The Nazis aryanized Flechtheim's gallery, as they would many other Jewish businesses. After the war, former Nazi party member Vömel claimed he didn't even remember who Flechtheim was. Flechtheim's former assistant, Curt Valentin, left the Flechtheim Gallery in 1934 and began working in the Berlin gallery of Karl Buchholz, who was authorized by Hitler and Goering to sell confiscated art to raise cash for the Nazis. The Nazis seized and sold off Flechtheim's private collection, as well as the contents of his gallery.

== Emigration and death ==
Six months after the Nazis came to power in 1933, Flechtheim, penniless, fled to Paris, and tried to find work with his former business partner, Daniel-Henry Kahnweiler and with the Mayor Gallery in London. However Flechtheim could not initially count on a work permit because of Great Britain's restrictive immigration laws. According to Flechtheim's biographer Ottfried Dascher, collaboration in Mayor's gallery was only possible if Flechtheim's name did not appear at exhibitions or to the press. Flechtheim subsequently organized exhibits in London of the paintings of exiled German artists. On August 8, 1935, Flechtheim wrote Alfred Barr of the Museum of Modern Art in New York City a letter informing him, “I lost all my money and all my pictures.” By November 1936, Flechtheim's former gallery assistant, Curt Valentin, had made a deal with the Nazis that would allow him to emigrate to New York and to sell “degenerate art” to help fund the Nazi war effort. In January 1937, with financing from Buchholz, Valentin left for New York and set up the Karl Buchholz Gallery at 3 West 46th Street which was later accused of serving as a conduit for bringing Nazi looted art, including paintings that had been seized from Flechtheim, into America. In March 1937 in London, Flechtheim slipped on a patch of ice, was taken to a hospital, punctured his leg on a rusty nail in his hospital bed, developed sepsis leading to amputation of his leg, and died. The Galerie Alfred Flechtheim GmbH disappeared in its entirety on 27 March 1937.

== Personal life ==
Flechtheim married Betty Goldschmidt, a wealthy Dortmund merchant's daughter. On a honeymoon trip to Paris, Flechtheim invested Betty's dowry in Cubist art, to the horror of his inlaws. The marriage was childless. Betty Flechtheim was with her husband in London during his final days. Then she returned to Berlin. In 1941, when she was ordered to report for deportation to Minsk, she ingested a lethal dose of Veronal. The Gestapo seized her art collection.

Professor Ossip K. Flechtheim, who in mid-1940s coined the term "Futurology", and later became a director of Otto-Suhr-Institut in West Berlin, was Alfred Flechtheim's nephew.

== Recovery of artworks ==
Flechtheim's heirs are attempting to recover artworks stolen from Flechtheim. These works reside in German museums and American museums, including the Museum of Modern Art.

In 2014, the Museum Ludwig in Cologne restituted Oskar Kokoschka's “Portrait of Tilla Durieux” (1910) to the Flechtheim heirs after a long investigation.

Ernst Ludwig Kirchner's "Das Soldatenbad" (1915) remained in the custody of Flechtheim's niece Rosi Hulisch in Berlin. It was acquired in 1938 by Kurt Feldhäusser, a member of the Nazi party. Upon Feldhäusser's death in 1945, the ownership of his collection passed to his mother, who brought the work to the United States and consigned it to the Weyhe Gallery in New York in 1949. It was then purchased by American philanthropist and collector Morton D. May of Saint Louis in 1952. May amassed one of the largest collections of German Expressionist art in America and donated over one thousand works from his collection to various institutions; Das Soldatenbad was donated to The Museum of Modern Art in New York in 1956. In an exchange in 1988, the work became part of the collection of The Solomon R. Guggenheim Foundation. In 2018, Das Soldatenbad was restituted to the heirs of Alfred Flechtheim by The Solomon R. Guggenheim Museum and Foundation after an extensive examination of the circumstances surrounding the painting's history. In November 2018, it sold at Sotheby's for $21,975,800 (including fees).

Oskar Kokoschka's "Joseph de Montesquiou-Fezensac" (1910) was sold by Alex Vömel to the National Museum of Fine Arts in Stockholm where it would later be transferred to the Moderna Museet. It remained in the Moderna Museet's collection until 2018, when it was restituted to Flechtheim's heirs. In November 2018, it sold at Sotheby's for $20,395,200 (including fees).

== Gallery ==
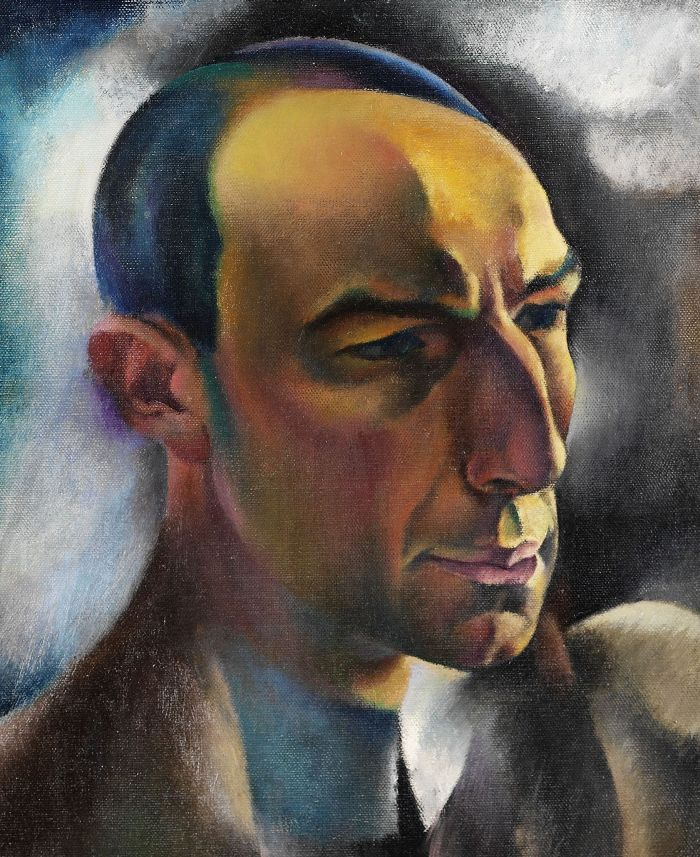
Portrait of Alfred Flechtheim by Hanns Bolz

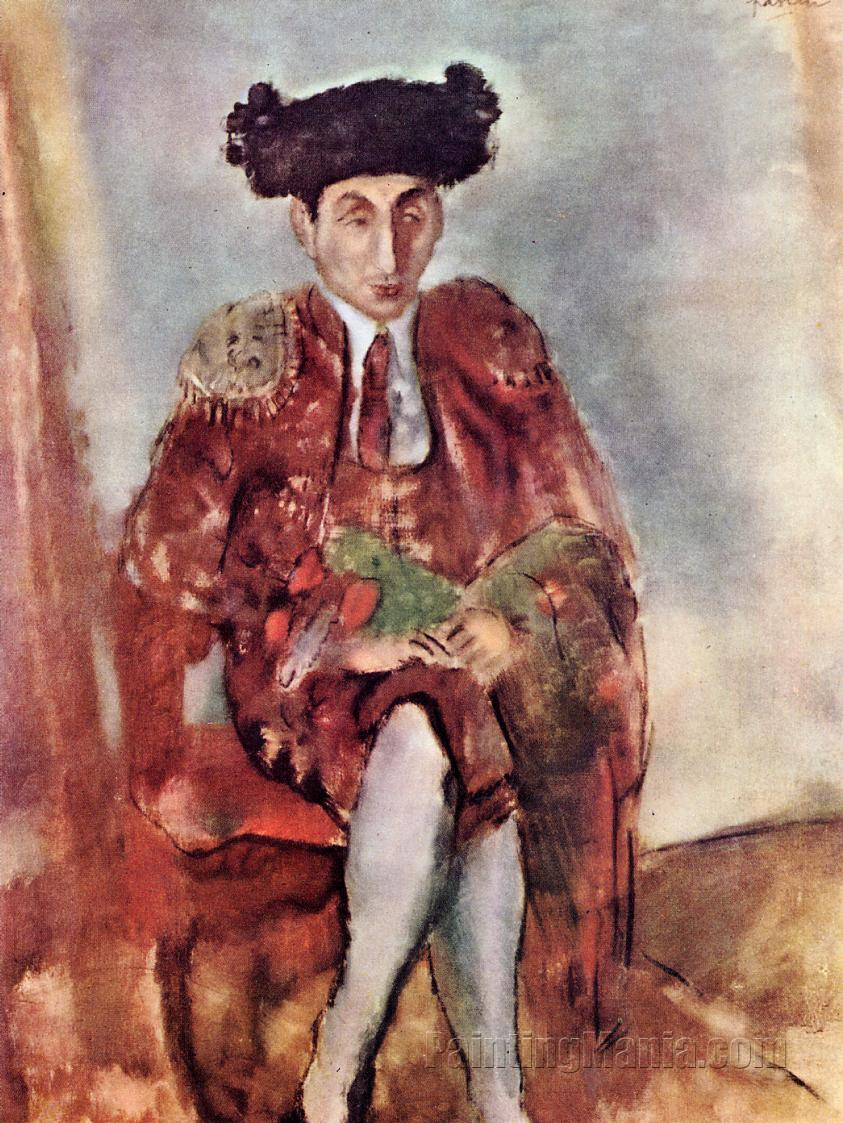
Flechtheim dressed as a toreador, by Jules Pascin, 1927

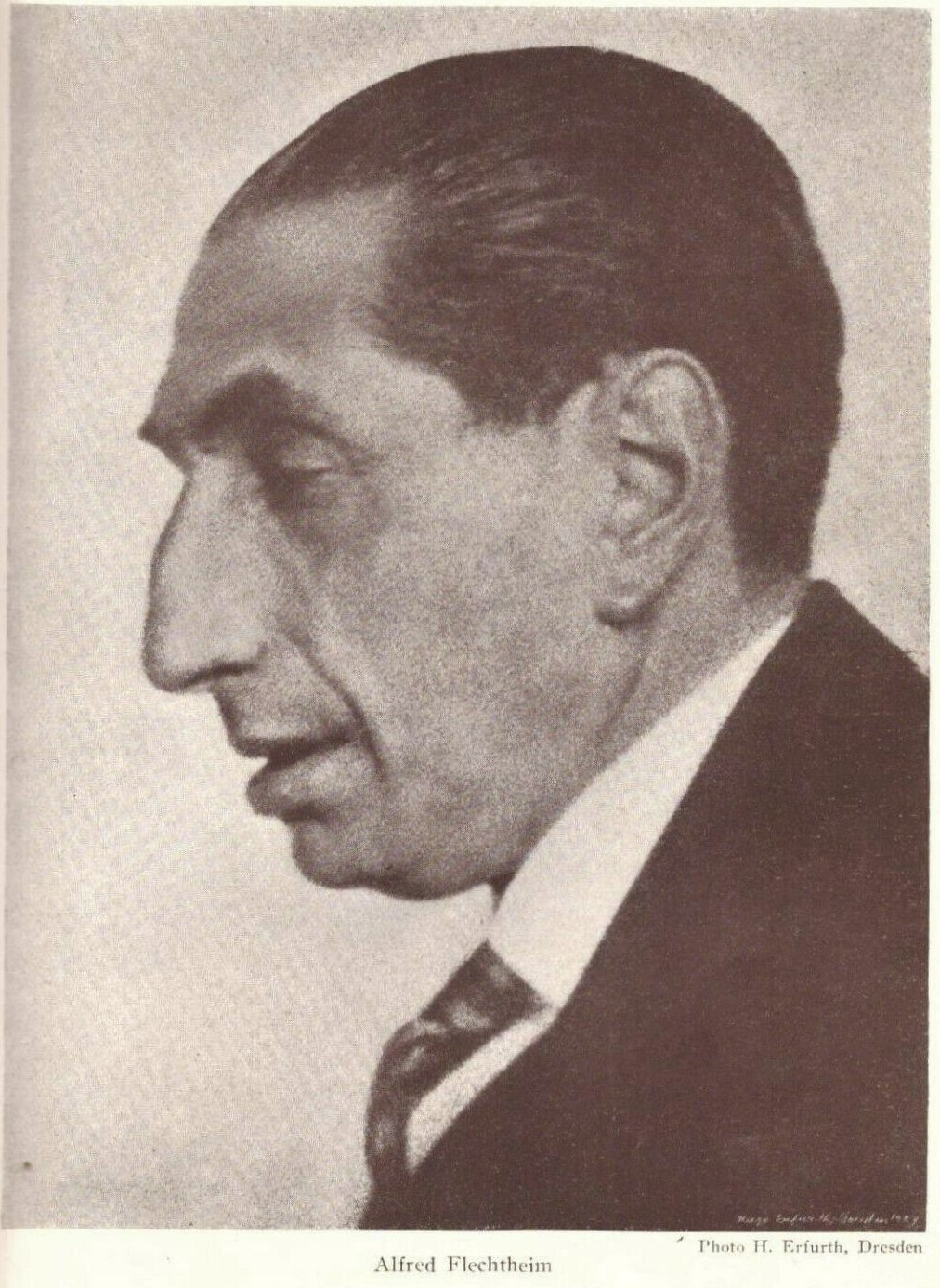
Portrait by Hugo Erfurth, 1928

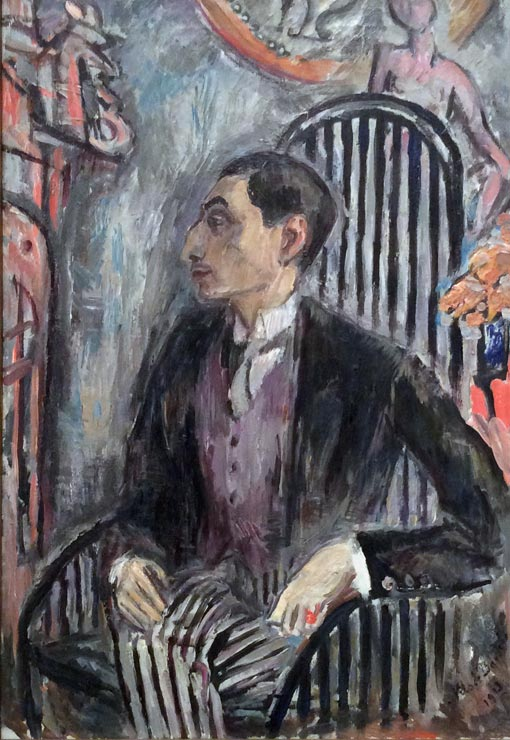
Portrait by Nils Dardel, 1913

== See also ==
- List of claims for restitution for Nazi-looted art
