= List of claims for restitution for Nazi-looted art =

The list of restitution claims for art looted by the Nazis or as a result of Nazi persecution is organized by the country in which the paintings were located when the return was requested.

== Australia and New Zealand ==
Illustration	Artist and artworks	Former owner / restitution request	Result
	Cornelis Bega Paintings anonymous artists	Federico Gentili die Giuseppe Claim for restitution to Art Gallery of South Australia in Adelaide	Restitution in 2000 by compensation.
	Painting Head of a Man previously attributed to Vincent van Gogh	Richard Semmel Claim for restitution to The National Gallery of Victoria	No litigation - return - painting remains in museum on 12-month loan
	Gerard ter Borch Portrait d'une femme avec un éventail Oil painting around 1670	Max Emden Collection Claim for restitution to National Gallery of Victoria, Melbourne	in process
	Macchiaioli Five paintings Mid-19th century	Cino Vitta Collection Claim for restitution to Public Gallery of Art, New Zealand, for five paintings in the 'école de Macchiaioli.	After an amicable settlement in April 1999, three paintings remained in the museum and two were placed in an auction. The proceeds of the sale were divided between the museum and the heirs.

== Croatia ==
Illustration	Artist and artworks	Former owner / restitution request	Result
	André Derain, Still Life With a Bottle, and Maurice de Vlaminick's Landscape by the Water, which were held by the National Museum of Modern Art	Dane Reichsmann request for restitution of art collection seized by the fascist Ustashe regime	In 2023 three museums restituted artworks to the Reichsmann heirs.

== Sweden ==
Illustration	Artist and artworks	Former owner / restitution request	Result
	Emil Nolde Blumengarten (Utenwarf)	Otto Nathan Deutsch Claim for restitution to Moderna Museet in Stockholm	Settlement in 2009 after six year dispute. The Moderna Museet had purchased the Nolde from the Ketterer Galerie in Lugano without provenance.

== Austria ==
Illustration	Artist and artworks	Former owner / restitution request	Result
	Martin van Heemskerck, Two altar wings with pictures of the donors	Richard Neumann Restitution claim to the city of Krems an der Donau	In 2007 the descendants of Neumann received back two paintings by "Kremser Schmidt" Martin Johann Schmidt, which had come into the possession of the city of Krems an der Donau illegally through the "Aryanization".
	Houses by the Sea (Häuser am Meer), 1914, by Egon Schiele	Jenny Steiner, Daisy Hellmann (née Steiner b. in Vienna 22 April 1890 – 5 January 1977) Claim against Leopold Museum	The Leopold Museum settled with Jenny Steiner's heirs, including Daisy's daughter, in 2012
	Rudolf Alt, Bäume (Skizzenbuchblatt), Bleistiftstudie, rücks. Nachlassstempel, 24,7 × 15,3 cm, Inv.-Nr. II/6218	Alfred und Valerie Eisler, Vienna Neue Galerie, Universalmuseum Joanneum, Graz	Restituted on 26 January 1953 to the heirs of Valerie Eisler
	Gustav Klimt, Damenbildnis (Portrait Ria Munk III), 1917–18 oil on canvas, 180.7 x 89.9 cm	Aranka Munk Lentos Art Museum in Linz	In 2009 restituted to the rightful heirs of Aranka Munk
	Four Trees; "Vier Bäume" by Egon Schiele	Josef and Alice Morgenstern claim to Österreichische Galerie Belvedere	In 2020 the Austrian Restitution Advisory Board recommended that Four Treesby Schiele be restituted to the Morgenstern heirs.
	porcelain object	Nathan Eidinger MAK, Vienna	In 2014 the advisory board recommended the restitution of several porcelain objects from the MAK to the heirs to Nathan Eidinger
	gouache by Philippe Berger	Käthe and Maximilian Kellner Albertina Museum, Vienna	In 2014 the advisory board recommended the restitution of a gouache by Philippe Berger from the Albertina to the heirs to Maximilian and Käthe Kellner
	drawing by Adolf Menzel	Leopolodine Mannaberg Albertina Museum, Vienna	In 2014 the advisory board recommended the restitution of the advisory board also recommended the restitution a drawing by Adolf Menzel to the heirs to Leopoldine Mannaberg
	Adolph von Menzel's gouache on paper Stehende Rüstungen (1886) ("Standing Suits of Armour")	Adele Pächter (murdered at the Theresienstadt concentration camp) Albertina Museum, Vienna	Restituted by the Albertina Museum to the heirs of Hermann and Adele Pächter in 2014
	Maiwiese by Emil Nolde	Otto Siegfried Julius Lentos Art Museum in Linz	Restituted to the rightful heirs of Otto Siegfried Julius in 2015
	Lesser Ury, Die Näherin, 1883 Oil on canvas, 52 x 42.5 cm	Fritz Loewenthal Lentos Art Museum in Linz	Restituted to the rightful heirs of Fritz Loewenthal in 1999
	Anton Romako, Mädchen mit aufgestütztem Arm (the daughter of the artist), ca.1875 Oil on canvas, 72.5 x 61 cm Anton Romako, Der Zweikampf (Kämpfende Ritter), Oil on canvas, 110 x 82.5 cm Anton Romako, Lager im Wald (Zigeunerlager), ca. 1879 Oil on canvas, 41 x 32 cm Anton Romako, Mädchen mit Nusskorb (Tochter des Künstlers), ca. 1880 Oil on canvas, 139 x 89.5 cm Anton Romako, Ungarische Puszta (Strohschober in Bálványos), ca. 1880 Oil on canvas, 26.5 x 21.5 cm Anton Romako, Bildnis Karl Schwach, 1854 Oil on canvas, 45.5 x 37 cm	Oskar Reichel, a medical doctor in Vienna, heirs' claim against Lentos Art Museum in Linz	In 2012 restituted to the legal successor of Oskar and Malvine Reichel. The six paintings will continue to be displayed at the LENTOS on permanent loan.
	Anton Romako	Oskar Reichel, a medical doctor in Vienna, heirs' claim against Albertina Museum in Vienna	
	Anton Romako (1832–1889) Lying dog, Watercolour, 23.2 x 32 cm Albertina, Inv. No. 29226	Armin Reichmann, Albertina Museum in Vienna	In 2012 the restitution committee recommended that the Albertina Museum restitute Romako's Lying Dog to the Reichmann heirs.
	Adoration of the Magi by Giovanni di Paolo (1460) and many other paintings	Oscar Bondy (d. 1946)	99 paintings seized from the Bondy collection by Nazis in 1938 in Vienna are said to have been restituted to his widow Elizabeth Bondy after the war in 1948, however this was only part of the collection. There were intensive negotiations with Austrian authorities, and serious issues with locating objects and obtaining export licences, as well as pressure to "donate". The Austrian advisory board was still studying the fate of the Bondy collection in 2021.
	Egon Schiele, The Portrait of Wally (1912)	Heirs of Lea Bondi Jaray claim against the Leopold Museum	After many years of litigation, in 2010, the Leopold Museum agreed to pay a settlement of $19 million to Bondi's heirs
		Elisabeth Bondy	Elizabeth Bondy, recommendation issued by Austrian advisory board on 27 Oct. 1999

== Belgium ==
Illustration	Artist and artworks	Former owner / restitution request	Result
	Louis Corinth Flowers (1913)	Gustav and Emma Mayer returned by Royal Museum of Fine Arts of Belgium (KMSKB)	Looted by the E.R.R., the artwork was recovered by Leo Van Puyvelde after the defeat of the Nazis and transferred to Belgium's Economic Recovery Department which placed it in the Royal Museum of Fine Arts in 1951. It was restituted to the Mayer heirs in February 2022.

== Germany ==
Illustration	Artist and artworks	Former owner / restitution request	Result
	Franz Marc The Foxes Die Füchse, 1913.	Kurt Grawi (1887–1945) claim to City of Düsseldorf and the Kunstpalast Museum	In 2017, Grawi's family demanded the restitution of Marc's painting The Foxes (1913) from Düsseldorf's Kunstpalast. It was decided to restitute in 2021.
	Peasant Girl Without a Hat by artist Wilhelm Leibl	Alexander Lewin Bremen Museum	restituted to the heirs in 2009
	Berlin Street Scene by Ernst Ludwig Kirchner	Alfred Hess Bruecke Museum in Berlin and City of Berlin	After initially arguing that financial troubles unrelated to Nazi persecution caused the sale, Berlin restituted the painting to the heirs.
	"Portrait of Felix Benjamin" by Max Liebermann	Felix Benjamin Von der Heydt Museum in Wuppertal	In July 2023, the Von der Heydt Museum restituted "Portrait of Felix Benjamin" by Max Liebermann to the heirs of Felix Benjamin
	painting by Wilhelm von Schadow's The Artist’s Children,	Max Stern v Dusseldorf	In 2023 the city of Düsseldorf agreed on a settlement with the heirs of Max Stern.
	drawing 'Felsige Waldlandschaft mit weitem Ausblick' by Isaak Major	Arthur Feldmann Kunsthalle Bremen	Looted, then sold twice at Sotheby's London (in 1946, and 1975), sold to the British Rail Pension Fund, then dealer C. G. Boerner in Düsseldorf who sold it to Kunsthalle Bremen. Identified by the research of Arthur Feldmann's grandson Uri Peled Feldmann. Restituted and purchased back in 2016
	Hans von Marées Husband with a Yellow Hat (Selbstbildnus mit gelbem Hut)	Max Silberberg claim to Berlin National Gallery	The Berlin National Gallery which had acquired Hans von Marées' Husband with a Yellow Hat at the forced Graupe auction of 1935, restituted the painting to the Silberberg heir in July 1999 and then bought it back the same year.
	Portrait of Max John, painting by Otto Dix (1920)	Fritz Glaser claim to Museum of Modern Art (Freiburg im Breisgau)	Negotiations with the heirs of Fritz Salo Glaser resulted in an accord with the museum.
	eight paintings by Max Beckmann, Juan Gris, and Paul Klee	Alfred Flechtheim claim to Bavarian State Paintings Collections (Pinakothek)	2016: lawsuit filed in U.S. District Court in New York by Michael Hulton of San Francisco and the widow of Flechtheim's nephew and heir Henry Hulton
	Tilla Durieux by Oskar Kokoschka and others	Alfred Flechtheim claim to Ludwig Museum	In 2013, the city of Cologne agreed to return from the Ludwig Museum Kokoshka's portrait of Tilla Durieux and other drawings to the Fleichtheim heirs. The family agreed to let the museum keep drawings by Karl Hofer, Paula Modersohn-Becker, Ernst Barlach, Aristide Maillol and Wilhelm Morgner on display in the museum.
	Windmill (Marschlandschaft mit rotem Windrad) by Karl Schmidt-Rottluff	Max Rüdenberg claim to Sprengel Museum	In 2017 the Sprengel Museum restituted the artwork to the heirs of the Holocaust victim Max Rüdenberg
	"Lighthouse With Rotating Beam" by Paul Adolf Seehaus	Alfred Flechtheim claim to Kuntsmuseum Bonn	2012 settlement with the Kuntsmuseum Bonn concerning "Lighthouse With Rotating Beam" by Paul Adolf Seehaus
	Ferdinand Georg Waldmüller, ‘Preparing the Celebration of the Wine Harvest’	Irma and Oscar Lowenstein Germany loaned the looted paintings to German museums	Seized for Führermuseum, then loaned to German museums, to be restituted in 2021 to the London-based Vision Foundation
	Ferdinand Georg Waldmüller, ‘The Good Natured-Child (The Beggar)’	Irma and Oscar Lowenstein Germany loaned the looted paintings to German museums	Seized for Führermuseum, then loaned to German museums, to be restituted in 2021 to the Lowenstein heirs, the London-based Vision Foundation
	Ferdinand Georg Waldmüller ‘The Grandparents’ Visit’	Irma and Oscar Lowenstein Germany loaned the looted paintings to German museums	Seized for Führermuseum, then loaned to German museums, to be restituted in 2021 to the London-based Vision Foundation
	triptych by Count Leopold von Kalckreuth	Marietta Glanville Neue Pinakothek in Munich, Bavarian State Paintings Collection,	restituted in March 2000
	Marchesa Imperiale mit Tochter (Marchesa Imperiale with her daughter) by Rubens	Jacob and Rosa Oppenheimer Staatsgalerie Stuttgart (State Gallery Stuttgart)	Research revealed out-of-court financial settlement in 1954. The 2000 claim was withdrawn.
	Egon Schiele, Kauernder weiblicher Akt (Crouching Female Nude), 1917.	Heinrich Rieger claim to Ludwig Museum in Cologne	restituted to heirs following Germany Advisory Commission unanimous recommendation
	Lucien Adrion; La Procession oil painting, 1927	Ismar Littmann; Restitution request to Fondation Ernst Strassmann.	Restituted to the heirs on 17 June 2003.
	Pablo Picasso Madame Soler	Paul von Mendelssohn-Bartoldy Restitution claim filed in Federal Court of New York against Bavaria (Bavaria State Painting collections)	In June 2021 Bavarian officials refused to refer the dispute to the national commission created to review claims of art lost in the Nazi era.
	Edvard Munch "A summer's night on the beach" (1902)	Alma Mahler-Werfel claim against sterreichische Galerie Belvedere	Restituted to Mahler-Werfel heirs after long battle
	Bernardo Bellotto; Canal Zwinger à Dresde oil painting, 1751	Max Emden Restitution request to Germany, after the painting was discovered hanging in the President's office.	Munich Central Collecting Point (number 1648), 15 January 1946 Treuhandverwaltung für Kulturgut, Munich Office of the Federal President, Bonn, on loan since 1961. At first Germany resisted a claim, but after an advisory panel decision it was finally restituted to Emden's heirs in 2019. Restituted to the heirs of Max Emden, 2019
	Friedrich Olivier, Shriveled Leaves (1817)	family of Dr Marianne Schmidl restitution request to the National Gallery of Art	"As part of an agreement with the Schmidl heirs announced on August 17, a similar drawing from the series – Oliver's Shrivelled Leaves – will remain in the gallery with an appropriate acknowledgment and financial compensation."
	A Branch with Shrivelled Leaves’, a drawing by Julius Schnorr von Carolsfeld (1794-1872)	family of Dr Marianne Schmidl restitution request to the National Gallery of Art	Restitution as part of an agreement concerning two artworks.
	Cornelis Bega Autoportrait, oil sketch on paper, avant 1664	Jacques Goudstikker Restitution request to Kunsthalle de Hambourg	Restitution en October 2006.
	Carl Blechen Faune endormi Huile sur bois avant 1840	Clara Freund, wife of Julius Freund Restitution request to Germany for this painting, as well as two other Blechens and an aquarelle by Anselm Feuerbach.	Restituted to the heirs en 2009.
	Lovis Corinth Femme avec lys dans une serre oil painting, 1911	Otto Ollendorff Restitution request to the museum of Görlitz	Restituted to Ollendorf heirs in 1998.
	Lovis Corinth Portrait de Charlotte Corinth oil painting, 1915	Ismar Littmann Restitution request to Hamburgische Landesbank	Restituted to the heirs 27 November 2001.
	Lovis Corinth Paysage romain oil painting, 1914	Curt Glaser Restitution request to city of Hannovre / Musée Sprengel	Restituted on 24 September 2007.
	Carl Spitzweg Le sorcier oil painting, 1875–80	Leo Bendel (murdered by Nazis) Restitution request to Kunstsammlung Rudolf August Oetker GmbH, Bielefeld.	after initial refusal, restituted by Oetker to Bendel heirs in 2019
	Cornelis Springer Marché avec hôtel de ville et église (Lübeck) oil painting, 1870	Victor Ephrussi Restitution request to city of Lübeck	Restituted to the heirs in February 2004.
	David Tenier Ländliche Szenen Öl auf Leinwand, 1677	Jacques Goudstikker Dzemande à la city of Cologne (Wallraf-Richartz-Museum)	Restituted to the heirs in December 2005.
	Hans Thoma Coucher de soleil sur le lac de Garde oil painting,	Ottmar Strauss Restitution request to Bayerische Staatsgemäldesammlung	Restituted on 5 October 2004.
	Giambattista Tiepolo Painting Rinaldo Saying Farewell to Armida (L'adieu de Rinaldo à Armida) by Giambattista Tiepolo oil painting, vers 1725–1726	Frederico Gentili di Giuseppe Restitution request to Gemäldegalerie de Berlin	Restituted in November 1999.
	Lorenzo Baldissera Tiepolo; Painting Portrait of a Bearded Man (Portrait d'un homme barbu) oil painting, XVIIIe siècle	Jacques Goudstikker Restitution request to musée Herzog-Anton-Ulrich à Brunswick	Restitution in December 2006 to the Goudstikker heirs.
	Jacopo Tintoretto Portement de la croix oil painting,	Lucie Mayer-Fuld widow of Harry Fuld Restitution request to Karl Haberstock	Settlement agreement between Lucie Mayer-Fuld and Karl Haberstock. The painting is now in the collection of the city of Düsseldorf.
	Cornelis Troost Tableau familial oil painting, XVIIIe siècle	Collection Jacques Goudstikker Restitution request to musée de Wiesbaden	Restituted to the heirs Goudstikker le 25 April 2007.
	Constant Troyon Vaches sur la plaine oil painting,	Collection Jacques Goudstikker Restitution request to city of Cologne	Restituted to the heirs en December 2005.
	Franz Xaver Winterhalter Jeune Fille des monts Sabins oil painting, vers 1835	Collection Max Stern Restitution request to Maria-Luise Bissonnette	Restituted on 27 December 2007 aux héritiers et au Max Stern Art Restitution Project.
	Philips Wouwerman École d'équitation oil painting, XVIIe siècle	Collection Arthur Goldschmidt Restitution request to Fondation Karl et Magdalene Haberstock	Restituted
	Henri Matisse, Femme assise, oil painting, vers 1924	Collection Paul Rosenberg Restitution request to German authorities after the painting was discovered in 2013 in Munich in the hoard of Cornelius Gurlitt, the son of Hitler's art dealer	Restituted to the heirs in 2015.
	Jean-Louis Forain, Portrait de femme de profil, oil painting, 1881	Armand Dorville Restitution request to German authorities after discover in the Gurlitt Collection in Munich. 2013	Restituted to the heirs in 2020.
	Jean-Louis Forain, Femme en robe du soir, aquarelle, vers 1880		Restituted to the heirs in 2020.
	Constantin Guys, Amazone sur un cheval cabré, encre sur papier		Restituted to the heirs in 2020.
	Camille Pissarro, La Seine vue du Pont-Neuf, au fond le Louvre	Max Heilbronn Restitution request to German authorities after discover in the Gurlitt Collection in Munich.	Restituted
	Adolph von Menzel, Inneres einer gotischen Kirche, dessin, 1874	Elsa Helene Cohen Restitution request to German authorities after discover in the Gurlitt Collection in Munich.	Restituted to the heirs in 2017.
	Ferdinand Georg Waldmüller, Der Wildbach Strubb bei Ischi, oil painting, 1831	Hermann Eissler Restitution request to German authorities after discover in the Gurlitt Collection in Munich.	Restituted to the heirs in 2017.
	Ferdinan Georg Waldmüller, Der Dachstein von Alt-Aussee gesehen, (View of Lake Altaussee and the Dachstein) oil painting, 1834	Hermann Eissler Restitution request to German authorities after discover in the Gurlitt Collection in Munich.	Restituted to the heirs in 2017.
	Thomas Couture, Portrait de jeune femme assise, oil painting, 1850	Georges Mandel. Restitution request to German authorities after discover in the Gurlitt Collection in Munich.	Restitution to Mandel's granddaughter, Maria de las Mercedes Estrada in 2019

== Canada ==
Illustration	Artist and artworks	Former owner / restitution request	Result
	Giorgio Vasari Les Noces de Cana oil painting, 1566	Collection d'art du musée de l'État hongrois Restitution request to musée des beaux-arts de Montréal	Restituted to Hungary in January 1999.
	Émile Vernet-Lecomte Aimée - Une jeune Égyptienne oil painting, 1869	Collection Max Stern Restitution request to an anonymous private seller at Sotheby's à New York. Put for sale in 2001, the painting was part of Max Stern's collection of 250 artworks	restitution agreement on 19 October 2006.
	Édouard Vuillard Le Salon de Madame Aron oil painting, 1911–1912	Collection Alfred Lindon Restitution request to National Gallery of Canada	Restituted on 24 September 2003.

== The Netherlands ==
Illustration	Artist and artworks	Former owner / restitution request	Result
	Kandinsky 'Painting with Houses	heirs of the Lewenstein family, (Emanuel Lewenstein, then his widow Hedwig Lewenstein and their children, Robert and Wilhelmine Lewenstein) restitution claim to Stedelijk Museum	Initially, in November 2018, the Dutch Restitution Decision ruled in favour of the City of Amsterdam and Stedelijk Museum, which housed the canvas, saying the "[i]nterest of the claimant in restitution does not outweigh the interest of the [Museum] in retaining the work." But the Kohnstamm Committee, which had been established in 2016, and the advocacy of Mondex Corporation, urged an end to the "balance-of-interest" test that had previously reigned in favour of the principle that "unless the facts expressly show otherwise, when assessing restitution applications concerning private individuals who belonged to a persecuted population group, we [will] assume that the loss of possession was involuntary." As a result of these changes, the painting was restituted to its rightful owners in February 2022.
	seven pieces of Italian majolica	Alfred Pringsheim heirs claim to Boijmans Van Beuningen Museum Foundation	IN 2008, the Boijmans received a letter from the representative of the Pringsheim heirs requesting the return. In 2024 the Boijmans museum includes the Pringsheim's majolica in its list of works with a suspicious provenance.
	"Woman Seated on the Grass at the Edge of a Meadow and Reading" by Nicolaas van der Waay	Isaak Leefsma and Helene Leefsma-Meijet (deported and murdered in Holocaust) Museum Boijmans Van Beuningen in Rotterdam	Boijman's director Dirk Hannema purchased the painting from the Nazi looting agency, Dieststelle Mühlmann, in 1943, shortly after the Jewish owners were deported to their deaths. It remained in the Boijmans until 2000, when it was restituted to the Leefsma heirs.
	Old Man with Beard (NK2694) by Salomon Koninck (1609–1656).	Alphonse Stettiner, Oscar Stettiner and Adele de Jong-Stettiner Claim for restitution to Dutch authorities (Netherlands Cultural Heritage Agency)	2 February 2015 The Dutch Restitutions Committee recommended rejecting the claim
	Dune Landscape with Deer Hunt by Gerrit Claesz Bleker	Richard Semmel claim for restitution Frans Hals Museum in Haarlem	Claim rejected in 2013 by the Dutch commission ("prioritises the interest of museums to keep paintings over the rights of claimants to restitution")
	Bernardo Strozzi's Christ and the Samaritan Woman at the Well (1635)	Richard Semmel Claim Museum de Fundatie in Zwolle	Claim rejected by Dutch Commission in 2013 because of the importance of the painting "Rejection revisited after international criticism; museum overrides panel decision in 2021 to pay €200,000 in compensation to Semmel's heirs"
	Portrait of Pieter Bouwens by Ferdinand Bol	Gustaaf Hamburger, Amsterdam Claim Museum Tongerlohuys, Roosendaal	Restituted to the heir of Gustaaf Hamburger in 2015
	Jan Davidsz. de Heem (Utrecht 1606-1684 Antwerp), A Banquet still life (NK 2711) also known as Still Life with Glass, Glass Stand and Musical Instruments	Jacob Lierens Claim to Dutch authorities (on loan to the Centraal Museum, Utrecht)	After many years of efforts to reclaim the paintings, the Lierens family was granted a favorable decision for restitution by the Dutch committee in 2019
	Dirck Hals (Haarlem 1591–1656) and Dirck van Delen (Heusden 1604/5-1671 Arnemuiden) A Merry Company in a palatial interior (NK 2584) also known as Banquet Scene with Musicians and Shuffle Board Players in an Interior	Jacob Lierens Claim to Dutch authorities (on loan to the Frans Hals Museum in Haarlem)	After many years of efforts to reclaim the paintings, the Lierens family was granted a favorable decision for restitution by the Dutch committee in 2019
	Salomon van Ruysdael River Landscape with Ferry	Jacques Goudstikker Claim against the Rijksmuseum	restituted after a battle to the heirs of the Goudstikker family in 2006
	"Little Boy on His Deathbed," by 17th-century Dutch master Bartholomeus van der Helst	Jacques Goudstikker Claim against The Netherlands	The looted painting remained in Dutch museum for a half century until the family won a restitution battle
	A River landscape with a beggar's family and horsemen near a ruin (NK2782), by Jan Josefsz. van Goyen	Gustaaf Hamburger claim for restitution Limburg Museum (on loan from Stichtung Nederlands Kunstbezit aas Esaias van de Velde)	Restitution to Hamburger heirs in March 2014 (confiscated by Dienstelle Mühlmann; anonymous Dorotheum sale (1942); Kunsthistoriches Museum Vienna; Stichtung Nederlands Kunstbesit (1951); NK2782; on loan to Limburg Museum in Venlo until restitution in 2014)
	Studio of Bernard van Orley (Brussels c. 1488-1541) Christ on the Road to Calvary (NK 1414)	Hans Ludwig Larsen Claim for restitution to Dutch authorities	Restituted to the heirs of Hans Ludwig Larsen, 2014 The Dutch Restitution Committee also decided to restitute NK 1410, NK 1412, NK 1417, NK 1420, NK 1424, NK 1428, NK 1441, NK 1447, NK 1451, NK 2243 and NK 2463 to Larsen's heirs, however it also recommended that payment "in return for restitution" be demanded.
	P. Bordone, Portrait of a man (NK 1771)	Jacob and Rosa Oppenheimer Claim for restitution to Netherlands Institute for Cultural Heritage in Rijswijk (‘ICN’).	The Dutch Restitution Committee issued its recommendation (1.67) on 4 February 2008, to return the painting Portrait of a man by P. Bordone (NK 1771) and the painting Merry company at a table by H.G. Pot (NK 2244) to the heirs of Rosa and Jakob Oppenheimer.
	H.G. Pot, Merry company at a table (NK 2244)	Jacob and Rosa Oppenheimer Claim for restitution to Netherlands Institute for Cultural Heritage in Rijswijk (‘ICN’).	The Dutch Restitution Committee issued its recommendation (1.67) on 4 February 2008, to return the painting Portrait of a man by P. Bordone (NK 1771) and the painting Merry company at a table by H.G. Pot (NK 2244) to the heirs of Rosa and Jakob Oppenheimer.
	numerous artworks by different artists	Friedrich Gutmann Claim for restitution to Dutch authorities	In 1942, Gutmann was forced to sell his collection and was murdered by the Nazis. After the war, the collection was returned to the Dutch government which refused to restitute it to the Gutmann family, compelling the sons to file a lawsuit. In 1952, the courts ruled that the collection would be returned to the Gutmann family "on condition that they pay the Dutch authorities the amount of money their father had received from the Germans for the works". In 2002, the Dutch commission relented, and returned the artworks to the family without obliging them to pay.
	The Marriage Feast at Cana by Johann Georg Platzer (NK 2216)	Alfred and Fanny Mautner Claim for restitution to Netherlands Art Property Collection (Dutch state	On 25 November 2020, the Dutch Restitutions Committee advised the Minister of Education, Culture and Science to restitute the painting NK 2216 The Marriage Feast at Cana by J.G. Platzer to the heirs of Alfred George Mautner (1887–1958) and Franziska Mautner (1909–2003).
	numerous artworks including by Jacob van Geel, George Hendrik Breitner, Jan Toorop, Dirck van Delen, Max Liebermann	Numerous claimants Claim for restitution to The Boijmans Van Beuningen Museum	Boijmans restitution page lists ongoing and resolved investigation.
	"Shepherdess with Child in Landscape," by Jacob Gerritsz,	Jacques Hedeman Claim for restitution to Dordrechts Museum	"After the case received extensive publicity, the museum and Hedeman's heirs reached an 'agreement' by which the painting would remain in the museum and the latter would pay an undisclosed amount to the heirs."
	"Portrait of a Man," by H.W. Wieringa	Claim for restitution to Robert May (1873–1962)	"Portrait of a Man," by H.W. Wieringa. In 2008, restitution claim refused by Dutch authorities.
	six paintings, including a Rembrandt	Catalina von Pannwitz-Roth (1876–1959) a German-born Jew of Argentine descent, Claim for restitution to Dutch authorities	The six paintings were sold in exchange for an exit visa. Status unresolved
	hundreds of artworks by different artists	Jacques Goudstikker Claim for restitution to Dutch authorities	In 2006, 202 artworks were returned to the Goudstikker family (out of 1250 pieces that were plundered). The New York Times reported that the restitution "raised hackles from some in the government."

== Spain ==
Illustration	Artist and artworks	Former owner / restitution request	Result
	Camille Pissarro Rue Saint-Honoré, après midi, effet de pluie oil painting, 1897	Collection Lily Cassirer Request for restitution to Thyssen Bornemisza Museum	Long court battle. Not restituted
	André Masson Métamorphose oil painting, 1930	Collection Pierre David Weill Restitution request to the National Museum Centro de Arte reine Sophie à Madrid	The painting had been sold several times; in 1995 it was bought by the National Museum. An amicable agreement was reached.
	15th-century paintings ‘Mater Dolorosa’ and ‘Ecce Homo’ attributed to the school of the Dutch painter Dieric Bouts.	Czartoryski collection in Gołuchów Museum of Pontevedra	Spain's Museum of Pontevedra returned the two paintings to Polish authorities in January 2023.

== United States ==
Illustration	Artist and artworks	Former owner / restitution request	Result
	Piet Mondrian Composition with Blue	heirs of Piet Mondrian restitution claim to the Philadelphia Museum of Art	Restitution claim filed in claim, filed in the Pennsylvania Court of Common Pleas in December 2021. Philadelphia Museum of Art fighting claim with technical defenses.
	Camille Pissarro Shepherdess Bringing in Sheep	Léone-Noëlle Meyer (daughter of Raoul Meyer) Claim for restitution of Pissarro to the Fred Jones Jr. Museum of the University of Oklahoma	After long court battle between Meyer and the Fred Jones Jr. Museum, and a 2016 settlement that recognized Meyer's ownership while imposing an obligation to move the painting between Paris and Oklahoma every three years, Meyer asked a French court to break the agreement as unworkable after the Orsay museum objected to "the cost of transporting the work between countries and the physical effect that would have on the fragile painting". The Fred Jones Jr. Museum sued Meyer demanding that she pay a $3.5 million fine. Meyer abandoned her effort to recover her father's Pissarro, saying, "I have no other choice"
	Meules de blé (Wheatstacks) (1888) by Vincent van Gogh	Max Meirowsky claim to Edwin Cox, a Texas collector	In November 2021, Meules de blé (1888), was sold at Christie's for $35 million after a three party restitution agreement involving the heirs of Max Meirowsky, Alexandrine de Rothschild, and representatives for Cox's estate which had purchased the painting from Wildenstein.
	Taunus Road by Ernst Kirchner (1916)	heirs of Dr. Max Fischer claim to a private collector	Restituted in 2020.
	Lucas Cranach the Elder, The Resurrection, 1530.	Margarete Eisenmann claim to Eugene Thaw	In 1949, the looted Cranach resurfaced at Sotheby's consigned by Hans W. Lange, whose auction house was known for forced sales of Jewish-owned property. It passed through Hugo Perls and Knoedler gallery before Eugene Thaw bought it around 1968. In April 2021 the Cranach was sold at auction following a settlement between the Eisenmann and Thaw heirs
	Landscape With Smokestacks by Degas	Friedrich and Louise Gutmann family claim to Daniel C. Searle	After insisting falsely that the painting had never belonged to Gutmann, where was murdered in the Holocaust, or that Gutmann sold it voluntarily, Searle ceded to public criticism and reached a settlement with the Gutmann family in 1998.
	Lucas Cranach the Elder : Adam and Eve pair of paintings, oil on panel, around 1530	Jacques Goudstikker Collection Claim for restitution to the Norton Simon Museum The pair of paintings was auctioned off in 1931 at the Rudolph Lepke auction house as part of the Stroganoff collection and acquired by Goudstikker; after 1945 restituted by the Dutch government to George Stroganoff, who sold it to Spencer Samuels, who sold it to Norton Winfred Simon.	Court battle
	Egon Schiele Portrait of the Artist's Wife (1917)	Heirs of Karl Maylaender claim to Foundation of Robert “Robin” Owen Lehman	Claims from two families of Holocaust victims, Maylaender and Heinrich Rieger against Lehman in 2019 for the Schiele acquired in 1964 from Marlborough Gallery in London.
	Vincent Van Gogh La cueillette des olives (The Olive Picking, 1889)	Heirs of Hedwig Stern lawsuit filed against the Metropolitan Museum of Art in New York and Basil & Elise Goulandris Foundation in Athens, Greece	Lawsuit filed in December 2022 alleges that the provenance published for Van Gogh's La cueillette des olives (The Olive Picking, 1889) omitted Hedwig Stern and that "the Met acquired it in 1956 and then 'secretly sold' it in 1972 to avoid facing restitution claims.
	Vincent Van Gogh Sunflowers	Heirs of Paul von Mendelssohn-Bartholdy, lawsuit filed against Sompo Holdings, a Japan-based insurance holding company	On 13 December 2022, the descendant of Mendelssohn-Bartholdy filed a lawsuit in federal court in Chicago against Sompo Holdings, the successor firm to Yasuda Fire & Marine which had purchased the painting for $39.9m (including fees) in 1987, alleging that the firm had been "recklessly indifferent" to the painting's past.
	"View of Beverwijk" by Salomon van Ruysdael	Heirs of Ferenc Chorin to Museum of Fine Arts, Boston	Looted in 1945, the painting was sold in 1982 by London art dealer Edward Speelman to the MFA, Boston. The provenance was false. Deaccessioned on 7 October 2021 for restitution to the heirs of Ferenc Chorin.
	Sand Hills by Ernst Ludwig Kirchner	Max Fischer claim to MoMa	After initially refusing the claim, MoMa restituted the Kircher, which it had acquired via Weyhe Gallery, in 2015, after it was discovered that museum had made a mistake in identifying the painting.
	Adoration of the Magi, by Corrado Giaquinto	Heirs of Federico Gentili Di Giuseppe Request for restitution to the Museum of Fine Arts, Boston (MFA)	In 2000, Gentili di Giuseppe's heirs contacted the Museum of Fine Arts (MFA) Boston concerning the restitution of the painting Adoration of the Magi, by Corrado Giaquinto. The MFA had purchased the painting from Thomas Agnew & Sons, Ltd, which had acquired it at Christie's. A settlement involving a "part purchase-part donation agreement" was reached in October 2000.
	buste de Francesco Mochi ("Buste d’un jeune garçon")	Heirs of Federico Gentili Di Giuseppe Request for restitution to the Art Institute of Chicago (AIC)	Settlement reached in 2000 between the heirs and the Art Institute of Chicago, which had purchased the bust from London art dealer Anthony Roth in 1989.
	Henri Matisse : Odalisque oil on canvas, 1928	Paul Rosenberg Collection Claim to the Seattle Art Museum	Restitution in October 2000 after reviewing and recommending the Holocaust Art Restitution Project (HARFE) in Washington.
	Claude Monet : Bord de Mer Pastel,1865	Adalbert Parlagi Collection Claim to an owner in Louisiana	Restored to Parlagi Heirs in 2024
	Claude Monet : Champs de Blé à Vétheuil Oil on canvas, 1879	Collection Gerda Dorothea de Weerth Claim for restitution to Edith Marks Baldinger; Private lawsuit in the New York District Court	Long court battle
	Amedeo Modigliani: Seated Man with Cane (L'homme assis)	Oscar Stettinger David Nahmad and International Art Center	Court battle Int'l Art Ctr. v. Estate of Stettiner
	Jan Mostaert : Portrait of a businessman oil on canvas, around 1520	Czartoryski collection claim to the Virginia Museum of Fine Arts (VMFA). The painting and the entire collection of the Czartoryski family in Warsaw were confiscated in 1942, brought to Austria and probably stolen there by American military personnel after the end of the war. In 1949 it came into the possession of the VMFA.	The VMFA started an inventory review in 1998 and identified the painting as looted art. It was returned to the Czartorsky Foundation in Warsaw in 2004.
	eight illuminated manuscripts	Alphonse Kann Wildenstein	Court battle Warin v Wildenstein & Co., Inc.
	Pablo Picasso Boy Leading a horse oil on canvas, 1905 to 1906	Belonged to art dealer Ambroise Vollard. Acquired by Gertrude Stein and Leo Stein, around 1907 to 1913. Paul von Mendelssohn-Bartholdy acquired in 1934 or 1935. Mendelssohn-Bartholdy sold before his death to the Jewish art gallery of Justin Thannhauser. Thannhauser fled Germany and spent most of war living in Switzerland. He then sold painting to former chairman of the Museum of Modern Art William S. Paley in 1936. Paley gifted to the Museum of Modern Art in 1964.	Julius Schoeps, Director of the Moses Mendelssohn Center for European-Jewish Studies at the University of Potsdam, as speaker for Mendelssohn-Bartholdy family, sued Museum of Modern Art in 2007 for the painting. Jed S. Rakoff ruled that Paul von Mendelssohn-Bartholdy had been forced to sell the painting by the Nazi Party. The dispute was settled out of court in February 2009, with the museum retaining the work.
	Pablo Picasso : The Actor (painting) oil on canvas, 1904 to 1905	1912 owned by Paul Leffmann, a German Jewish businessman forced to flee the Nazis in 1938. Sold under duress to a Paris dealer according to court papers to fund escape from the Nazis. Eventually purchased in 1941 by Thelma Chrysler Foy from Knoedler gallery in New York. She donated it to the Metropolitan Museum of Art in New York City, in 1952, where it has since been displayed.	In 2016, heir of Leffmann sued Metropolitan Museum of Art in U.S. federal court, seeking return of the painting on the ground that Leffman had sold it under duress. In 2018, U.S. District Court for the Southern District of New York ruled in favor of the Met, ruling that the plaintiff could not show, under New York law, that the painting was sold under duress. The U.S. Court of Appeals for the Second Circuit affirmed the dismissal on the ground that the claim was raised too late (72 years after the work was sold and 58 years after it was donated to the art museum).
	Pablo Picasso : Femme en blanc oil on canvas, 1922	Carlotta Landsberg Collection Claim against Marilynn Alsdorf	Restituted in August 2005 through financial compensation.
	Pablo Picasso : The Absinthe Drinker (Portrait de Angel Fernándo de Soto) ) Oil on canvas, 1903	Paul von Mendelssohn-Bartholdy Collection Claim to the Andrew Lloyd Webber Art Foundation	Court battle, followed by settlement.
	Pablo Picasso : Head of a Woman ( Tête de femme ) pastel, 1903	Collection Paul von Mendelssohn-Bartholdy Claim to the National Gallery of Art, Washington DC	The picture was returned to the heirs in 2020.
	Pablo Picasso Still Life with a Portrait 1906 oil on canvas	Belonged to Dr Meyer-Udewald, murdered (Auschwitz ) in the Holocaust Her premature death activated the terms of the 1925 Will of Ernst Schlesinger. Restitution claim to the Phillips Collection	Settlement, with secret terms. Still Life with a Portrait was sold at Christies after the settlement
	Egon Schiele Russian War Prisoner	Heirs of Fritz Grünbaum Claim to Art Institute of Chicago	The Art Institute of Chicago refused restitution and sued the Manhattan District Attorney.
	Rembrandt Harmensz van Rijn (attributed): The Liberation of Saint Peter from Prison Drawing,	Arthur Feldmann Collection Claim to a private owner	Restituted on 30 November 2004
	Interior of a Church, School of 16th-century Flemish artist Pieter Neeffs the Elder	Arthur Feldmann Claim for restitution to the Metropolitan Museum of Art in New York	Restituted 2007 Interior of a Church, that has been attributed to the School of 16th-century Flemish artist Pieter Neeffs the Elder, to the heirs of its original owner, Dr. Arthur Feldmann. The drawing, looted by the Nazis in 1939, will be returned by the Metropolitan Museum of Art to Uri Peled, grandson of Dr. Feldmann.
	Pierre-Auguste Renoir : Le Poirier Oil on canvas,	Fritz Gutmann Claim to the Parke-Bernet auction house, New York The painting was confiscated in France during World War II; In 1969 it was auctioned in New York; its whereabouts are unknown.	No returns, the auction house (now Sotheby's) did not disclose the name of the buyer.
	Pierre-Auguste Renoir : Paysage pres de Cagnes Oil on canvas,	Richard Semmel Claims for restitution to the heirs of Newton Korhumel	Before the painting was auctioned at Christie's auction house, Richard Semmel's heirs and the owners agreed on a compensation payment.
	Peter Paul Rubens : Allegory of Eternity Oil on canvas, around 1625	Rosa and Jacob Oppenheimer Claim to the San Diego Museum of Art	In May 2004 the heirs and the museum came to an agreement, the painting remained in the museum after a compensation payment.
	Egon Schiele : Dead City III Oil on canvas, 1911	Fritz Grünbaum Collection Claim against the Leopold Foundation in Vienna.	The painting was confiscated at a retrospective exhibition in New York in 1998, but was returned to the Leopold Foundation in Vienna in the same year after a court order.
	Egon Schiele : Portrait of Walburga Neuzil (Wally) Oil on wood, 1912	Collection Lea Bondi-Jaray Claim against the Leopold Foundation in Vienna.	The painting was confiscated from a retrospective exhibition in New York in 1998. After twelve years of negotiations, the painting was returned to the Leopold Foundation in July 2010, which pays compensation of 19 million dollars to the heirs.
	Madonna and Child Enthroned with Saints Nicholas of Tolentino and Sebastian	Jacques Goudstikker collection Restitution claim to the Virginia Museum of Fine Arts	VMFA Board of Trustees voted to restitute
	Egon Schiele "Woman Hiding Her Face" (1912) and "Woman in a Black Pinafore" (1911),	Fritz Grunbaum Restitution claim to art dealer Richard Nagy	Legal battle resulting in a court ruling to restitute to the Grunbaum heirs
	"The Rape of Tamar," circa 1640, attributed to Eustache Le Sueur.	Siegfried Aram Restitution request to the Metropolitan Museum of Art	After refusing to restitute to Aram who died in 1978, the Metropolitan modified the provenance which had omitted Siegried Aram's previous ownership to mention him in 2020.
	Portrait of a Man and Woman in an Interior (1665–67) by Dutch artist Eglon van der Neer (1634–1703)	Walter Westfeld (murdered in Auschwitz) restitution request to the Boston Museum of Fine Art	Settlement in 2011
	François Boucher Les Amoureux Jeunes oil painting, XVIIIe siècle	André Jean Seligmann / Claim to the Utah Museum of Fine Arts	Restituted in April 2004.
	El Greco Le Mont Sinaï oil painting, vers 1600	Collection Ferenc Hatvany (François de Hatvany) Claim for restitution to the Metropolitan Museum of Art in New York and the Museum of Heraklion (Greece). Le tableau avait été mis en sécurité lors de l'entrée des troupes allemandes à Budapest en 1944; on ne sait pas comment il a refait surface dans le marché de l'art en 1945.	The claim for restitution was rejected.
	Marc Chagall L'Échelle de Jacob Peinture vers 1930	Erna Menzel The painting was looted in 1941 by the 'ERR in Bruxelles. After the war it turned up in a private collection in the United States. In 1966, Erna Menzel learned of its location and demanded restitution.	Court battle was decided by the New York Supreme Court on 22 October 1966. Restituted. Menzil V. List was the first restitution case in the United States.
	Gustave Courbet Le Grand Pont oil painting, 1864	Josephine Weinmann Collection Claim for restitution to Yale	Restituted on 23 October 2001
	Corneille de Lyon Portrait de Jean d'Albon oil painting, XVIe siècle	Julius Priester Collection The painting was seized by the Gestapo in 1938 in Vienna and then turned up in the US at the Virginia Museum of Fine Arts.	Restitution in May 2004.
	Lucas Cranach l'Ancien Adam et Ève oil painting vers 1530	Jacques Goudstikker Claim for restitution to Norton Simon Museum	Marei von Saher-Langenbein request for restitution was rejected by the court in 2012.
	Henri Matisse Ruisseau dans les Alpes oil painting, 1907	Alphonse Kann Collection Claim for restitution to the Menil Collection in Houston (Texas)	Settlement resulting in financial compensation of the heirs in exchange for the artwork remaining in the museums on 22 January 2002
	Paul Gauguin Street Scene in Tahiti (1891)	heirs of Hugo and Martha Nathan (Ullin) claim to Toledo Museum of Art	The Toledo Museum sued the heirs for quiet title.
	The Diggers 1889 by Vincent van Gogh	heirs of Hugo and Martha Nathan (Ullin) claim to Detroit Institute of Art (DIA)	The Detroit Museum of Art rejected the claim arguing that Michigan's three-year statute of limitations precluded the court or a jury from deciding the merits of the case. DIA then initiated a successful Declaratory Judgment Action, Detroit Institute of Arts v. Ullin
	Self Portrait with Model by George Grosz	Grosz Heirs v. Museum of Modern Art	Case against the MoMa was dismissed due to statute of limitations.
	Degas painting Danseuses	Est. of Kainer v. UBS AG, No. 76, 2021 WL 5927040 (N.Y. 16 Dec. 2021).	The Court of Appeals affirmed dismissal citing the doctrine of forum non conveniens
	Seine at Asnières by Claude Monet	Mme F. Helphen Detroit Institute of Art	The DIA purchased the Monet through Fine Arts Associates (Otto Gerson) in 1948. After it was discovered to have been looted it was returned to Mme F. Helphen.
	Van Gogh's View of the Hospice and the Chapel of Saint-Remy	Margarete Mauthner claim against Elizabeth Taylor	Claim dismissed due on statute of limitations grounds. Taylor then sold the painting at Christies.
	Woman with a Fan by Jean Metzinger	Lewenstein family	Restitution in September 2026.

== France ==
Illustration	Artist and artworks	Former owner / restitution request	Result
	Georges Braque L'Homme à la guitare oil painting, 1911–1912	Alphonse Kann Collection Claim for restitution to Centre Pompidou	The Pompidou Center's Musée national d'art moderne (Mnam) had purchased the Braque from Heinz Berggruen in 1981. After investigation of the Kann claim, and intervention by a judge, a settlement agreement was reached between the French state and the Kann heirs in 2005.
	Camille Pissarro "Darse de peche et bassin Duquesne, Dieppe, apres-midi ensoleillee" (Fishing dock and Duquesne basin, Dieppe, sunny afternoon)	Salomon Flavian collection French lawsuit against Sotheby's	French court ruled in November 2026 that the painting must be restituted and Sotheby's must divulge the name of the seller.
	Cornelis Janssens van Ceulen Femme en bleu	Gabrielle Philippson musée Massey in Tarbes	Settlement announced in 2026
	Georges Braque Table avec blague à tabac oil painting, 1930	Paul Rosenberg Collection Claim for restitution to Madame de Chambrun	Restituted to the heirs.
	Bernardo Bellotto dit Canaletto Vue de l'église de la Salute depuis l'entrée du Grand Canal oil painting, vers 1730	Bernhard Altmann Collection Claim for restitution to Musée des Beaux-Arts de Strasbourg	The City of Strasbourg paid 2.5 million euros (0.5 of which came from sponsorship) to the Altmann heirs.
	Marc Chagall Le Père, oil painting, 1911	Heirs of David Cender. Claim of Restitution made to Paris Museum for the Art and History of Judaism.	David Cender survived the war and in 1958, in France, he submitted a request for war loss compensation from the government of West Germany, but was unsuccessful. Sometime between the late 1940s and early 1950s, Chagall himself reacquired the artwork, presumably without knowing its provenance, and in 1988 Le Père was donated by Chagall's heirs to the Musée National d'Art Moderne in Paris, which then transferred it to the Paris Museum for the Art and History of Judaism. In 2015 Mondex Corporation began researching the painting and in 2020 submitted a restitution claim, which the museum accepted. In order to complete the restitution, though, Mondex continued advocating on behalf of Cender's heirs for the creation of a legal exception to France's standard practice of not deaccessioning artworks in state museums. This exception came to be when the Assemblée Nationale passed a bill pertaining to the restitution of Le Père and fourteen other artworks, on 21 February 2022.
	Albert Gleizes Paysage oil painting, 1911 MNR R 1 P	Collection Alphonse Kann / Claim for restitution to musée national d'art moderne, Centre Pompidou	Restituted in July 1997.
	François Marius Granet La Mort de Nicolas Poussin en 1665 dessin, 1833 MNR REC 97	Collection Alphonse Kann Claim for restitution to the Louvre	Restituted on 16 March 1998.
	Frans Hals Portrait du pasteur Adrianus Tegularius oil painting, vers 1650	Adolphe Schloss Collection Claim for restitution to Adam Williams, Newhouse Galleries	Restituted in July 2001.
	Gustav Klimt Die Erfüllung Gouache, Werkvorlage zum Stoclet-Fries, 1905–1909	Collection Karl Grünwald Restitution request to Musée d'Art Moderne de Strasbourg	Restitution ordered by court after legal battle 11 January 1999.
	Fernand Léger La Femme en rouge et vert oil painting, 1914 MNR R 2 P	Collection Leonce Rosenberg Restitution request to musée national d'art moderne, Centre Pompidou	Restituted to the heirs in September 2003.
	Gustav Klimt Rosiers sous les arbres	Nora Stiasny (1898–1942) Restitution request to the Orsay Museum in France	The launch of the restitution process was announced by France's culture minister Roselyne Bachelot in March 2021.
	Léon Lhermitte Les Glaneuses pastel, 1892 MNR REC 163	Collection Levi de Benzion conservée en République fédérale d'Allemagne jusqu'en 1989, remis à l'Etat français en 1994, puis par l'Etat français aux ayants droit Lévi de Benzion	Restituted on 6 November 1996.
	Henri Matisse Mur rose oil painting, 1898 MNR R 5 P	Collection Harry Fuld Restitution request to French government	Restituted to the heirs on 27 November.
	Claude Monet Nymphéas (1904) oil painting, 1904 MNR 214	Collection Paul Rosenberg Restitution request to Collection nationale	Restituted to the heirs on 29 April 1999.
	Pablo Picasso Tête de femme oil painting, 1921 MNR R 16 P	Collection Alphonse Kann Restitution request to musée national d'art moderne (Centre Pompidou)	Restitution in 2003 ordered by court decision.
	Egon Schiele Soleil d'automne II Sonnenblumen or Wilted Sunflowers (Autumn Sun II) oil painting,	Collection Fritz Grünwald Restitution request to a private collector	Restituted to the heirs.
	Bernardo Strozzi La Sainte Famille avec Jean-Baptiste oil painting, vers 1630 MNR 290	Collection Frederico Gentili di Giuseppe Restitution request to the Louvre	Restituted to the heirs by judicial decision in December 1999.
	Giambattista Tiepolo Alexandre le Grand et Campaspe dans l'atelier d'Appele oil painting, vers 1725–1726 MNR 305	Collection Frederico Gentili di Giuseppe Restitution request to the Louvre	Restituted to the heirs by judicial decision in December 1999.
	Alessandro Magnasco Joueurs de cartes devant une cheminée oil painting, vers 1700 MNR 798	Collection Frederico Gentili di Giuseppe Restitution request to the Louvre	Restituted to the heirs by judicial decision in December 1999.
	Moretto da Brescia (Alessandro Bonvicino) Visitation de Marie oil painting, XVIe siècle MNR 277	Collection Frederico Gentili di Giuseppe Restitution request to the Louvre	Restituted to the heirs by judicial decision in December 1999.
	Rosalba Carriera Portait de femmes pastel, XVIIIe siècle MNR REC 73	Collection Frederico Gentili di Giuseppe Restitution request to the Louvre	Restituted to the heirs by judicial decision in December 1999.
	D'après Antoine Watteau Concert dans un parc oil painting, XVIIIe siècle MNR 890	Edgar Stern. Restitution request to French State for paintings that were in the MNR collection (looted by Nazis and repatriated to France)	Restituted in October 2020 to the heirs of Marguerite Stern
	Cornelis Beelt Intérieur d'écurie huile sur bois, XVIIe siècle MNR 923	Edgar Stern. Restitution request to French State for paintings that were in the MNR collection (looted by Nazis and repatriated to France)	Restituted in October 2020 to the heirs of Marguerite Stern
	Mathys Schoevaerdts Place avec église, obélisque et passants oil painting, XVIIe siècle MNR 925	Edgar Stern. Restitution request to French State for paintings that were in the MNR collection (looted by Nazis and repatriated to France)	Restituted in October 2020 to the heirs of Marguerite Stern
	Anonyme Scène dans un parc gouache, XVIIIe siècle MNR REC 146	Edgar Stern. Restitution request to French State for paintings that were in the MNR collection (looted by Nazis and repatriated to France)	Restituted in October 2020 to the heirs of Marguerite Stern
	Jean-Honoré Fragonard (manière de) Scène galante, aquarelle, XVIIIe siècle MNR REC 147	Edgar Stern. Restitution request to French State for paintings that were in the MNR collection (looted by Nazis and repatriated to France)	Restituted in October 2020 to the heirs of Marguerite Stern
	Alexandre-Gabriel Decamps, Deux singes au piano, aquarelle, XIXe siècle MNR REC 149	Edgar Stern. Restitution request to French State for paintings that were in the MNR collection (looted by Nazis and repatriated to France)	Restituted in October 2020 to the heirs of Marguerite Stern
	Ernest Meissonier Joueurs d'échecs dessin, XIXe siècle MNR REC 150	Edgar Stern. Restitution request to French State for paintings that were in the MNR collection (looted by Nazis and repatriated to France)	Restituted in October 2020 to the heirs of Marguerite Stern
	André Derain, La Chapelle-sous-Crécy, oil painting, vers 1910	René Gimpel.	Restituted to the heirs of Gimpel in 2020.
	André Derain, Pinède, Cassis, oil painting, 1907	René Gimpel.	Restituted to the heirs of Gimpel in 2020.
	André Derain, Vue de Cassis, oil painting, 1907	René Gimpel.	Restituted to the heirs of Gimpel in 2020.
	Camille Pissarro, La Cueillette des pois, gouache, 1887	Simon Bauer Restitution request to Brune and Robbie Toll who purchased the painting at Christie's in 1995.	Restituted after court battle to Simon Bauer's grandson Jean-Jacques

== Great Britain ==
Illustration	Artist and artworks	Former owner / restitution request	Result
	Nicolò dell'Abbate Sainte Famille oil painting, XVIe siècle	Arthur Feldmann Restitution request to British Museum	April 2006, financial settlement with art remaining in museum.
	Lucas Cranach l'Ancien Vénus et l'Amour voleur de miel oil painting vers 1525	Collection Emil Goldschmidt (jusqu'à 1909) National Gallery of London	
	Albert Cuyp Portrait d'un gentleman, Jacob Gerritsz oil painting, 1631	Collection Jacques Goudstikker Restitution request to Sotheby's	The painting was restituted on 30 October 2003.
	Thomas de Keyser Résurrection du Christ oil painting, XVIIe siècle	Collection Jacques Goudstikker Restitution request to Rafael Valls Gallery of London	Financial compensation was agreed on 29 June 2006.
	Gerrit Lundens Chasseur courtisant une trayeuse oil painting, XVIIe siècle	Collection Jacques Goudstikker Restitution request to Christie's, London	Financial compensation was agreed on 3 July 2006.
	Frans van Mier l'Ancien A dog lying down oil painting, XVIIe siècle	Collection Arthur Feldmann Restitution request to this painting and two others at the Courtauld Institute in London	In January 2007, the heirs and the Institute reached an agreement: two paintings were returned and the third remained in the museum.
	View of Hampton Court Palace (1710), by Jan Griffier the Elder	The painting was owned by a Jewish banker from Düsseldorf who was killed by the Nazis in the late 1930s. His children, who made the claim, were sent to Britain, where their mother joined them after spending time in a concentration camp. The Tate	"The Government has agreed to pay the £125,000 based on the recommendations of a panel that was established to help resolve claims from people who lost cultural objects during the Nazi era that are held by British collections."
	Claude Monet Au Parc Monceau oil painting, 1878	Collection Ludwig Kainer Restitution request to Sotheby's At the auction, it was established that the painting had been stolen.	An agreement has been reached between the sellers and the heirs of the Kainer collection.

== Hungary ==
Illustration	Artist and artworks	Former owner / restitution request	Result
	Lucas Cranach l'Ancien L'Annonciation à Joachim oil painting, 1518	Collection Mór Lipót Herzog Claim for restitution to the Hungarian National collection	In July 2010, the heirs filed a lawsuit against the Republic of Hungary with the Washington District Court for the return of this and 39 other paintings.
	Francisco de Zurbarán Saint André oil painting, vers 1630–1632	Collection Mór Lipót Herzog Claim for restitution to the Hungarian National collection	In July 2010, the heirs filed a lawsuit against the Republic of Hungary with the Washington District Court for the return of this and 39 other paintings.
	Gustave Courbet Le Château de Blonay (neige) oil painting vers 1875	Collection Mór Lipót Herzog Claim for restitution to the Hungarian National collection	In July 2010, the heirs filed a lawsuit against the Republic of Hungary with the Washington District Court for the return of this and 39 other paintings.
	El Greco: L'Agonie dans le jardin (Christ au Mont des oliviers) oil painting, vers 1610	Collection Mór Lipót Herzog Claim for restitution to the Hungarian National collection	In July 2010, the heirs filed a lawsuit against the Republic of Hungary with the Washington District Court for the return of this and 39 other paintings.
	Mihály Munkácsy Dusty Road (Poros út) oil painting, 1874	Collection Jenô Vida Restitution request to Szépmûvészeti Múzevers de Budapest	Restituted on 26 November 2002.
	Mihály Munkácsy Deux familles oil painting, 1877	Collection Jenô Vida Restitution request to Szépmûvészeti Múzevers de Budapest	Restituted on 26 November 2002.
	Mihály Munkácsy Les Visiteurs du bébé oil painting, 1879	Collection Jenô Vida Restitution request to Szépmûvészeti Múzevers de Budapest	Restituted on 26 November 2002.
	Mihály Munkácsy Le Christ devant Pilate oil painting, étude, 1880	Collection Jenô Vida Restitution request to Szépmûvészeti Múzevers de Budapest	Restituted on 26 November 2002.

== Ireland ==
Illustration	Artist and artworks	Former owner / restitution request	Result
	The Campion Hall Triptych	Fritz Mannheimer John Hunt collection, Hunt Museum Limerick	Restituted to the Mannheimer heirs

== Greece ==
Illustration	Artist and artworks	Former owner / restitution request	Result
	91 Jewish religious and ceremonial objects, including Torah scrolls, Torah mantle, and silver finials	Looted by Nazi forces from Greek synagogues and Jewish families during World War II	Returned to Greece by Poland in March 2026, planned to be displayed at the Jewish Museum of Greece

== Israel ==
Illustration	Artist and artworks	Former owner / restitution request	Result
	Edgar Degas Quatre danseuses nues en repos charcoal drawing, 1898	Collection Goudstikker Restitution request to the Israel Museum in Jérusalem	Restituted to the heirs in March 2005 then left on deposit at the museum.
	Paul Klee Danse du voile drawing	Harry Fuld Restitution request to the Israel Museum in Jerusalem The drawing arrived in the museum in 1950	Restituted to the heirs.
	Camille Pissarro Boulevard Montmartre, printemps oil painting, 1897	Max Silberberg Restitution request to the Israel Museum in Jerusalem	Restituted to the heirs in February 2002

== Italy ==
Illustration	Artist and artworks	Former owner / restitution request	Result
	Jacopo del Sellaio Madonna and Child with the Young St John and Two Angels (1480–85)	Gustav Arens, Ann and her husband Friedrich Unger Restitution claim to the Cerruti Foundation of Turin	A financial settlement in 2020
	Sandro Botticelli Portrait d'un jeune homme à la casquette rouge oil painting, 1484	Collection Fritz Gutmann Restitution request to an anonymous Italian citizen	Restituted in March 1997 to the heirs of Fritz Gutmann.
	Romanino Le Christ portant sa croix, oil painting, vers 1542-1543	Collection Federico Gentile di Giuseppe Restitution request to Mary Brogan Museum of Art & Science of Tallahassee in Florida.	Restituted to the heirs de Federico Gentile di Giuseppe 18 April 2012 by order of a federal court

== Japan ==
Illustration	Artist and artworks	Former owner / restitution request	Result
	Paul Klee Fliegenstadt Aquarelle, 1921	Collection Lissitzky-Küppers Restitution request to Kiyomizu Sannenzaka and the Kyoto Museum	Restituted to the heirs on 29 January 2001.
	Alfred Sisley Soleil de Printemps - Le Loing oil painting, 1892	Collection Louis Hirsch Restitution request to an unknown Japanese collector	Restituted on 24 March 2004.

== Liechtenstein ==
Illustration	Artist and artworks	Former owner / restitution request	Result
	Wilhelm Leibl Jeune fille devant une fenêtre drawing, 19th century	Collection Max Silberberg Restitution request to Fondation Ratjen de Vaduz	Restituted in 1999 via financial compensation

== Czech Republic ==
Illustration	Artist and artworks	Former owner / restitution request	Result
	František Kupka Composition abstraite oil painting, vers 1920	Jindrich Waldes Restitution request to National Gallery Prague.	Restituted in 1996.
	Otakar Nejedly Paysage oil painting, vers 1920	Collection Oskar Federer Restitution request to East Bohemian Gallery of Fine Arts in Pardubice	
	Rembrandt (école) Le Juif au bonnet de fourrure oil painting, vers 1660	Adolphe Schloss Restitution request to National Gallery Prague	Restituted on 25 June 2002
	Paul Signac Barque sur la Seine oil painting, vers 1901	Emil Freund / Restitution request to Jewish Museum of Prague.	Restitued December 2008.

== Switzerland ==
Illustration	Artist and artworks	Former owner / restitution request	Result
	Claude Monet Poppy Field near Vétheuil	Max Emden Restitution request to Foundation E.G. Bührle Collection	Juan Carlos Emden demanded for years that the Bühlre Foundation clarify the Nazi-era gaps in the provenance The Foundation rejected Emden's claim.
	Dompteuse by Otto Dix	Ismar Littmann (1878-1934) Restitution request to Kunstmuseum Berne	The Otto Dix painting which had belonged to Holocaust victim Ismar Littmann was found in the Gurlitt Collection. In 2021 the Berne museum agreed to restitute it.
	Pierre Bonnard La Vénus de Cyrène oil painting	Bernheim Jeune Restitution request to Kunstmuseum de Bâle	Settlement agreement 8 July 1998: painting remains in museum
	Ferdinand Hodler Thunersee mit Stockhornkette	Max Silberberg Simon and Charlotte Frick Stiftung, St Gallen Museum	In 2023 an agreement was reached between the heirs of Holocaust victim Max Silberberg and the Simon and Charlotte Frick Foundation in Switzerland.
	John Constable Dedham from Langham oil painting	John et Anna Jaffe Restitution request to musée des beaux-arts de La Chaux-de-Fonds in Switzerland	Restituted in 2018 after a long battle
	Wassily Kandinsky Improvisation Nr. 10 oil painting	Collection Sophie Lissitzky-Küppers Restitution request to Fondation Beyeler	The painting was returned to the museum in return for financial compensation.
	Max Liebermann École de couture à l'orphelinat d'Amsterdam oil painting	Collection Max Silberberg Restitution request to Bündner Kunstmuseum de Chur	Restituted on 11 May 1999, now in the Von der Heydt Museum, Wuppertal
	Édouard Manet La Sultane oil painting 1871	Collection Max Silberberg Restitution request to Fondation Collection E.G. Bührle of Zurich	Bührle foundation refused restitution.
	Henri de Toulouse-Lautrec Le Premier Tricot oil painting,	Jakob Goldschmidt Restitution request to heirs of Jacques Koerfer	After 12 years of litigation, the Swiss federal tribunal ordered the restitution of this painting as well as Dans la loge also by Toulouse-Lautrec

== Poland ==
Illustration	Artist and artworks	Former owner / restitution request	Result
	Jan van Goyen's 1638 painting Huts on a Canal	Jacques Goudstikker Request for information to the Gdansk Museum	Poland refused restitution.
	A Boy, in Profile, Singing, in a Feigned Oval by Pieter de Grebber	Abe Gutnajer Anonymous Latvian owner	negotiated deal between the current Latvian owner and Gutnajer's descendants in 2008
	81 works seized in the Netherlands by the Nazis or their agents most likely ended up in occupied Poland.	The Origins Unknown Agency, a Dutch organization that investigates cases of looted art, was commissioned by the Conference on Jewish Material Claims Against Germany, to investigate art looted from Dutch Jews that ended up in Poland.	

== Annexes ==
=== See also ===
- Nazi plunder
- Aryanization
- The Holocaust
- Führermuseum
- Reichsleiter Rosenberg Taskforce
- Bruno Lohse
- Hans Wendland
- Vugesta
- The Holocaust in Austria
- The Holocaust in France
- Max Silberberg
- Friedrich Gutmann
- Musées nationaux récupération

=== Bibliography ===
- Nazi looting : the plunder of Dutch Jewry during the Second World War, Gerard Aalders Oxford; New York : Berg, ©2004.
- Robbing the Jews : the confiscation of Jewish property in the Holocaust, 1933-1945, Martin Dean, Cambridge : Cambridge University Press, dr. 2011.
- Le marche de l'art sous l'Occupation : 1940–1944, Emmanuelle Polack; Laurence Bertrand Dorleac, Paris : Tallandier, 2020
- Göring's man in Paris : the story of a Nazi art plunderer and his world, Jonathan Petropoulos, New Haven : Yale University Press, [2021]
- (de)Thomas Armbruster, Rückerstattung der Nazi-Beute, die Suche, Bergung und Restitution von Kulturgütern durch die westlichen Alliierten nach dem Zweiten Weltkrieg, Zurich, de Gruyter, Berlin 2007, ISBN 978-3-89949-542-3, (Schriften zum Kulturgüterschutz), (et aussi Zurich, université, Dissertation, 2007)
- (de)Ulf Häder, Beiträge öffentlicher Einrichtungen der Bundesrepublik Deutschland zum Umgang mit Kulturgütern aus ehemaligem jüdischen Besitz. Koordinierungsstelle für Kulturgutverluste, Magdebourg 2001, ISBN 3-00-008868-7, (Veröffentlichungen der Koordinierungsstelle für Kulturgutverluste 1).
- (de)Jonathan Petropoulos, Kunstraub und Sammelwahn. Kunst und Politik im Dritten Reich. Propyläen, Berlin 1999, ISBN 3-549-05594-3.
- (de)Alexandra Reininghaus, Recollecting. Raub und Restitution. Passagen-Verlag, Vienne 2008, ISBN 978-3-85165-887-3.
- (de)Gunnar Schnabel, Monika Tatzkow, Nazi Looted Art. Handbuch Kunstrestitution weltweit. Proprietas-Verlag, Berlin 2007, ISBN 978-3-00-019368-2.
- Schuhmacher, Jacques, Nazi-Era Provenance of Museum Collections: A research guide. UCL Press, London 2024, ISBN 9781800086906.

=== External links ===
- (en) Lost Art Register, Koordinierungsstelle für Kulturgutverluste Magdebourg
- (en) Art Law Group, Herrick, Feinstein LLP: Resolved Stolen Art Claims
- Austria Restitution Reports
- Restitutionen Archiv Kunstverwaltung des Bundes

==== Links to restitution reports from national committees ====
- Reports Austria (Provenance Research and Restitution in the Austrian Federal Collections
- Annual Reports Dutch Restitution Committee
- Recommendations Dutch Restitution Committee
