= Galerie Nierendorf =

Art gallery in Berlin

The Galerie Nierendorf is a commercial art gallery based in Berlin founded by Karl and Josef Nierendorf in 1920, and reopened in 1955 as the Galerie Meta Nierendorf by Florian and Inga Karsch.

== Founding and early years ==
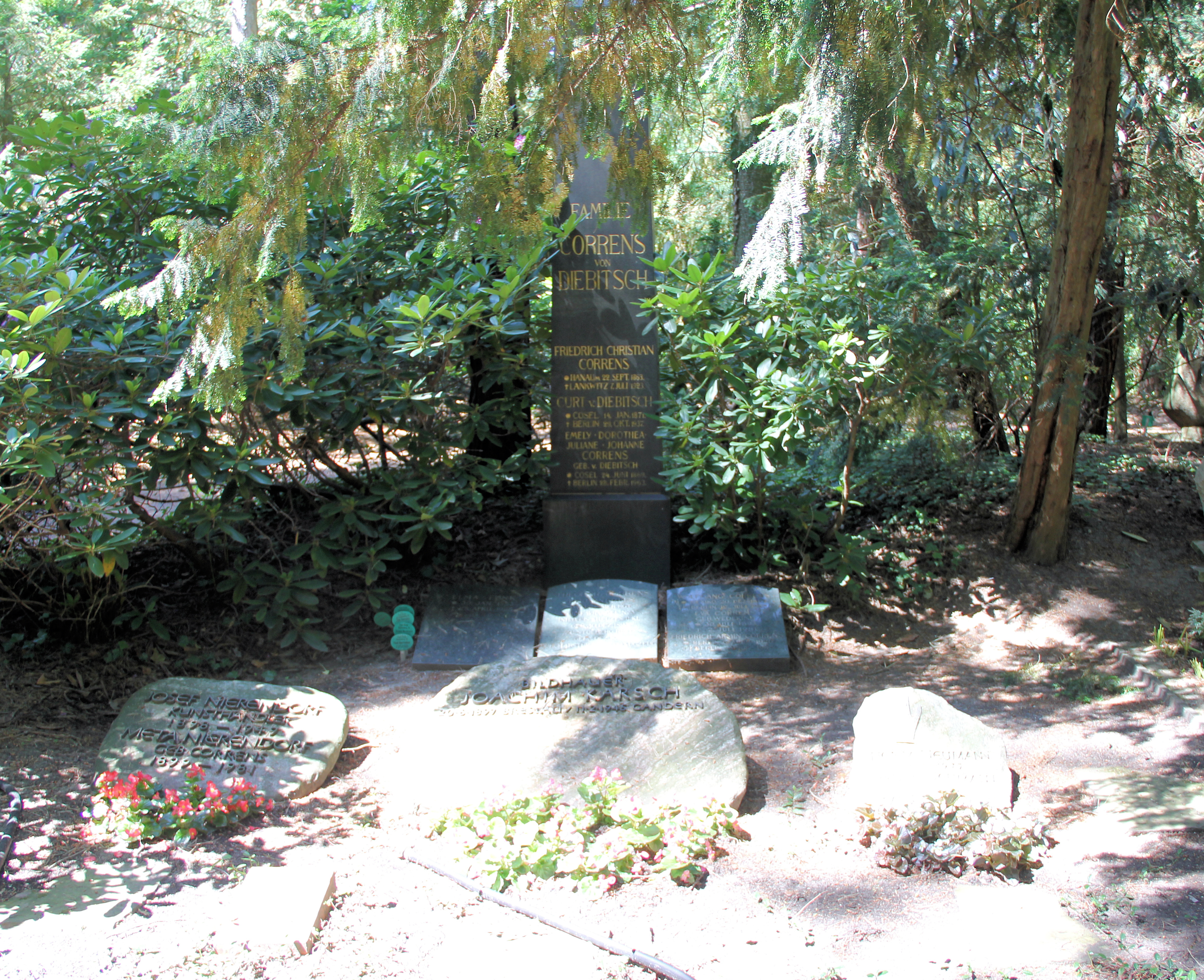
Grave of Josef and Meta Nierendorf, Thuner Platz 2–4, in Berlin-Lichterfelde

The brothers Karl (1889–1947) and Josef (1898–1949) Nierendorf founded Nierendorf Köln Neue Kunst in Cologne in 1920. In 1925 Josef Nierendorf moved the gallery to Düsseldorf for a year. Karl Nierendorf had already taken over the graphic cabinet from I. B. Neumann in Berlin in 1923 and transformed it into the Neumann-Nierendorf Gallery in 1925, which he and his brother Josef ran under this name from 1926, from 1933 as the Nierendorf Gallery. As in the Rhineland, the Nierendorf brothers also exhibited expressionist art in Berlin, by artists such as Otto Dix and the Brücke artists Erich Heckel, Emil Nolde and Karl Schmidt-Rottluff. Even unknown up-and-coming artists such as the student and later painter and art teacher Lorenz Humburg, Karl Blossfeldt or the neo-objective painter Ernst Thoms got a chance at Nierendorf. The gallery owners saw themselves as patrons, sponsors and publicists of the artists they represented.

Karl Nierendorf suffered serious heart attack in 1934.

=== Berlin to New York ===
In 1936 Karl Nierendorf went to the US and opened the Nierendorf Gallery in New York in January 1937, on 53rd Street; his brother continued to run the Berlin gallery alone until 1939. When Josef was drafted into the Wehrmacht, he had to give up the business. Karl Nierendorf became an American citizen and the gallery grew, especially with emigre artists such as Lyonel Feininger, Kandinsky, and Klee. He also helped emerging American artists such as Perle Fine, Adolph Gottlieb, and Louise Nevelson. He died of a heart attack in 1947. His estate was sold by the state of New York to the Solomon R. Guggenheim Museum. Josef Nierendorf died in 1949.

=== Reopening as Galerie Meta Nierendorf ===
Florian Karsch (1925–2015), stepson of Josef Nierendorf, and his wife Inge Karsch reopened the gallery in 1955 as the Galerie Meta Nierendorf in a room in the bookshop of Josef Nierendorf's widow of the same name. In 1963 the gallery, art publisher and art dealer moved to Hardenbergstraße 19 in Berlin-Charlottenburg, where it still exists today as Galerie Nierendorf under the leadership of Ergün Özdemir-Karsch, Florian Karsch's adoptive son. The artists represented by the gallery include not only those mentioned above, but also representatives of Expressionism and Classical Modernism such as Ernst Barlach, Max Beckmann, Marc Chagall, Lovis Corinth, Gerhard Marcks, Otto Mueller, Hannah Höch and Christian Rohlfs, but also contemporary artists like Louise Christine Thiele.

In 1995 the Karsch couple donated half of their collection to the Berlinische Galerie, including the graphic work by George Grosz.

== Controversies concerning Nazi-looted art ==
The Galerie Nierendorf has been involved in several cases of suspected Nazi-looted art. These include:

- "Two Nudes (Lovers)" by Oskar Kokoschka which had belonged to the Jewish collector Dr. Oskar Reichel before Otto Kalllir sold it to the Galerie Nierendorf
- Zirkusreiter (Circus rider) by Max Pechtstein which had belonged to the famous Jewish art dealer Alfred Flechtheim
- "Foxes" by Franz Marc which had belonged to the Jewish art collector Kurt Grawi
- "Marschlandschaft mit rotem Windrad" by Karl Schmitt-Rottluff which had belonged to Max und Margarethe Rüdenberg

== Writing ==
- Kunstblätter der Galerie Nierendorf, Verlag Galerie Nierendorf
- Anja Walter-Ris: Die Geschichte der Galerie Nierendorf. Kunstleidenschaft im Dienst der Moderne. Berlin, New York 1920-1995. Freie Universität, Berlin, Diss., 2003.
- Yvonne Groß: Zwischen Dix und Müller – Der Berliner Kunsthändler Florian Karsch und die Galerie Nierendorf, Berlin, Lexxion Verlagsgesellschaft, 2014.
