= Cino Vitta =

Italian jurist, art collector

Cino Vitta (Florence, May 26, 1873 - Florence, January 4, 1956) was an Italian jurist, academic and art collector of Jewish heritage.

== Biography ==
Vitta was born in Florence on May 26, 1873, to Annetta and Edoardo Modigliani, a wealthy Jewish family of Piedmontese origin. From a young age he showed a special interest in law, which enabled him to achieve a brilliant career in academia. In 1912 he married Emma Melli. The couple had one son, Edward.

With Santi Romano, Oreste Ranelletti, Federico Cammeo and Ugo Forti, he was part of the so-called Italian School that based administrative law on the teachings of Vittorio Emanuele Orlando.

During the years of World War I he was mayor of the municipality of Tavarnelle Val di Pesa. After the war he became an administrator in the municipality of Florence, and was later appointed a member of the reform commissions chaired by Ugo Forti for the reorganization of the state. He was also appointed president of the Israelite Community of Florence.

He died in Florence on January 4, 1956.

=== Academic career ===
In 1907, Vitta was awarded tenure in administrative law and, in 1910, was appointed extraordinary professor of administrative law and science of administration at the Cesare Alfieri Institute in Florence.

In 1920 he won the competition for the chair of administrative law at the University of Cagliari, where he taught until 1927, then moved first to the University of Modena, then to the University of Turin, in 1932. His work in Italian law was accompanied, in the early part of the 1930s, by a series of experiences abroad for courses in international law, where he taught, among other institutions He was a lecturer at the Académie de droit international in The Hague between 1930 and 1936.Between 1933 and 1935 he wrote Administrative Law in two volumes, his major work.

In 1938 Benito Mussolini's fascist racial laws banned him, as a Jew, from teaching in academies and cultural institutes in Italy. Forced to abandon university teaching, he hid for years with his wife in an asylum in the province of Siena, with the help of a doctor friend. He resumed teaching after the war, in 1944.

In 1949 he was appointed professor emeritus in recognition of his high intellectual and scientific qualities by the University of Turin.

After the war, he was released from teaching and assigned to do research on eastern public law.

== Art collector ==
Vitta had an art collection that was looted during the Nazi era. Heirs filed claims for five paintings from the Macchiaioli school, including “Woman Rocking a Baby” by Odoardo Borrani and “The Baker’s Shop at Settignano” by Telemaco Signorini. Some of the artworks were later restituted or the object of a settlement.

== Opera ==
- Cino (1912). Difficoltà e limiti nel diritto pubblico moderno : discorso inaugurale letto nell'aula magna del R. Istituto di scienze sociali "Cesare Alfieri" il 12 novembre 1911. Firenze: Tipografia Galileiana.
- Vitta, Cino (1913). Il potere disciplinare sugli impiegati pubblici. Milano: Società editrice libraria.
- Cino (1928). Le persone giuridiche pubbliche in Francia e in Italia. Università degli studi. OCLC 933884706.
- Cino (1929). Divergenze nella dottrina italiana sui principî fondamentali del diritto internazionale pubblico. Athenaeum. OCLC 312580774.
- Cino (1929). Nuovi cenni sulla responsabilità dell'amministrazione pubblica per fatti illeciti. Torino: Unione tipografico-editrice torinese.
- Cino (1955). Diritto amministrativo. Unione tipografico-editrice torinese. OCLC 889138808.

== See also ==
- The Holocaust in Italy
- List of claims for restitution for Nazi-looted art

== Bibliography ==
- Novissimo Digesto Italiano. Vol. XX. Torino: UTET. 1975. pp. 1033–1034.
- Giovanni Miele (1956). "Cino Vitta". Rivista trimestrale di diritto pubblico. pp. 191–192.
- Montero, José Pérez (1956). "IN MEMORIAM: CINO VITTA (1873-1956)". Revista Española de Derecho Internacional (in Spanish). Vol. 9, no. 1/2. pp. 311–314. JSTOR 44292362.
- Aldo Sandulli (2009). Costruire lo stato. La scienza del diritto amministrativo in Italia (1800-1945). Milano: Giuffrè. pp. 310–311.
