= Siegfried Aram =

German lawyer and cultural politician

Siegfried Aram (real name Abraham, born May 28, 1891, in Heilbronn; died January, 1978 in New York) was a German lawyer, cultural politician, art collector and art dealer.

== Early life ==
Siegfried Aram was a son of the merchant Sigmund Abraham and Thekla, née Grünwald. His maternal grandfather was the merchant Adolf or Adolph Grünwald, who, after returning from America in the early 1860s, joined Sigmund Abraham as a partner in 1893. Sigmund Abraham eventually became the owner of the Adolf Grünwald company, which was located at Kaiserstraße 27 after the addresses Kieselmarkt 3 and Lixstraße 12.

== Education and professional life ==
Aram graduated from the Realgymnasium in his hometown, then studied law. He was then employed as a court assessor in Stuttgart, then as a lawyer at the Higher Regional Court. He co-founded the journal Das Gelbe Blatt and was its editor. He advocated the founding of an adult education center and founded the Schwäbische Landesbühne. His circle of friends included Hans Hildebrandt, Oskar Schlemmer, Willi Baumeister and Rudolf Utzinger. Aram bought the small castle of Schapbach near Freudenstadt, also known as Villa Hohenhaus, and worked as an art dealer. His father had collected art. After Sigmund Abraham's death in 1925, his widow sold the house in Heilbronn and moved to Berlin.

After the First World War, Aram became the target of radical right-wing persecution after the so-called Schefflenzer Waffenschiebung became known.

Warren Chase Merritt created a portrait of Aram.

Together with art dealer Martin Ehrhardt, Siegfried Aram bought the so-called Holzenhaus, the little castle of Schapbach, in the 1920s. In 1930 the Galerie Ehrhardt published a book about drawings he authored. Aram was one of the donors of the St. Cyriak Stations of the Cross in Schapbach painted by Bernhard G. Lucki.

== Nazi persecution ==
When the Nazis came to power in Germany in 1933, Aram was persecuted because he was Jewish. He fled Nazi Germany via Italy and Gibraltar, arriving in the United States in 1934. He lived in Detroit and New York and ran the Aram-Ehrhardt Galleries. In 1937 he changed the name of the gallery to S.F. Aram, Inc. or Siegfried Aram Gallery,

In 2020 a painting that he had once owned was discovered with a false provenance and changed title in the Metropolitan Museum of Art. For decades, Aram had sought to recover the painting, called “The Rape of Tamar,” and attributed to the French artist Eustache Le Sueur, which he said had been taken by a businessman, Oskar Sommer, who purchased his home in Germany.

== Literature ==
- Hans Franke: Geschichte und Schicksal der Juden in Heilbronn. Stadtarchiv Heilbronn, Heilbronn 1963 (Veröffentlichungen des Archivs der Stadt Heilbronn, 11), S. 209ff. und 230 ff.

== Links ==
- Stadtarchiv Heilbronn, Datenbank HEUSS

== See also ==
- Eustache Le Sueur
- List of claims for restitution for Nazi-looted art
- The Holocaust
- Aryanization
