= Otto Gerson =

German-born American art dealer

Otto Gerson was a German-born American art dealer (1902-1962).

In 1939, Gerson married Ilse Goehler and together they owned three art galleries, the Gerson Gallery (also called the Otto Gerson Gallery), Marlborough-Gerson Gallery and Fine Arts Associates.

Gerson held numerous exhibitions and printed many art catalogues. Art dealer Jane Wade worked for Otto Gerson and played an important role in the success of the gallery.

Artworks sold by Gerson are in many museums, including the Detroit Institute of Art, the Kimbell Art Museum, the Norton Simon Museum, the MoMa, the Cleveland Museum of Art, the Museum of Fine Arts, Boston, the National Gallery of Art and many others.

== See also ==
List of claims for restitution for Nazi-looted art

Fernand Halphen
