= Federico Gentili Di Giuseppe =

Italian Jewish businessman and art collector

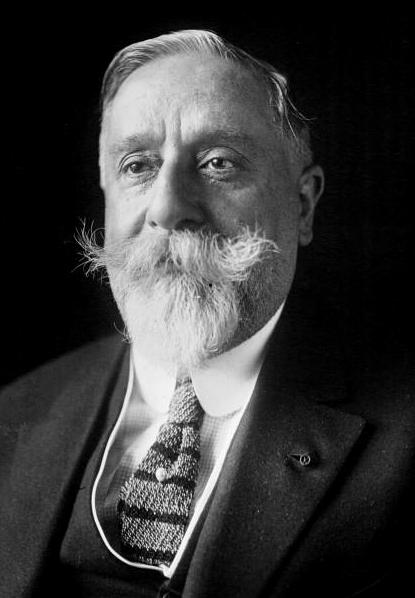
- Di Giuseppe in 1921
- Born: 24 March 1868; Vittorio Veneto, Treviso, Italy
- Died: 20 April 1940 (aged 72)
- Children: 2

Federico Gentili Di Giuseppe, also known as Frédéric Gentili di Giuseppe (Vittorio Veneto, 24 March 1868 - Paris, 20 April 1940) was a Jewish businessman and art collector whose collection was looted during the Nazi era.

== Early life ==
Federico Gentili di Giuseppe was born in 1868 into a wealthy Italian Jewish family, the son of Giuseppe and Carolina Gentili di Giuseppe. He married Emma de Castro, with whom he had two children: Marcello (born 1901) and Adriana (born 1903).

== Translations and art collection ==
During the 1920s, he moved to Paris. He translated Stendhal's writings into Italian and devoted much energy to collecting works of art, and came to own 150 Italian paintings (including the famous Christ carrying the cross by Girolamo Romani).

In 1922, he bought a telescope built by Emile Schaër around 1910; this was given in 1946 to the Pic del Migdia Observatory by his son Marcel in gratitude for the protection offered him during the Second World War from 1942.

== Nazi seizures ==
In April 1940: Federico Gentili di Giuseppe died, leaving his two children, Marcello and Adriana Gentili di Giuseppe, who fled from Nazi occupied territory in June 1940. A French court ordered the seizure and sale of Gentili di Giuseppe's property, and the auction took place at the Hôtel Drouot in Paris in April 1941.

== Claims for restitution ==
In 1950 his daughter Adriana began trying to claim the return of the looted paintings from the Louvre in Paris after seeing them on display there, but the museum refused her requests repeatedly, in 1951, in 1955 and in 1961. In 1998 Di Giuseppe's heirs sued the Louvre for five artworks in a lawsuit known as Gentili di Giuseppe Heirs v. Musée du Louvre and France. The appeals court ordered the restitution of the artworks to the heirs in June 1999. The paintings, which had been acquired by intermediaries for Reichsmarschall Hermann Göring were: La Visitation by Moretto da Brescia (1498-1554); La Sainte Famille by Bernardo Strozzi (1581-1644); Alexandre et Campaspe chez Apelle by Giambattista Tiepolo (1669-1770); Joueurs de cartes devant une cheminée by Alessandro Magnasco (1667-1749); and Portrait de femme by Rosalba Carriera (1675-1757).

In 1999 Di Giuseppe's heirs requested the return of a bust by Francesco Mochi's Bust of a Young Boy from the Art Institute of Chicago. The bust had been sold in France in a sale that was later annulled by French judges because it was Nazi spoliation. The parties settled in 2000.

In 2000 his heirs contacted the Museum of Fine Arts (MFA) Boston concerning the restitution of the painting "Adoration of the Magi", by Corrado Giaquinto. The MFA had purchased the painting from Thomas Agnew & Sons, Ltd, which had acquired it at Christie's. A settlement involving a "part purchase-part donation agreement" was reached in October 2000.

In 2012, a judge in the case "Christ Carrying the Cross Dragged by a Rascal – Gentili di Giuseppe Heirs v. Italy" ordered the Pinacoteca di Brera in Milan return the 16th century Baroque painting to the heirs Di Giuseppe. Christ Carrying the Cross Dragged By A Rascal by Girolamo de Romani was one of 70 items stolen from the collection of Di Giuseppe under the French Vichy Government.

In a 2022 interview about Nazi looted art, Corinne Hershkovitch talked about the challenges of researching the fate of the Di Giuseppe's's collection.

== See also ==
- List of claims for restitution for Nazi-looted art
- The Holocaust in France
- Nazi plunder
