= Restitutions Committee =

Dutch art restitution committee

Restitutions Committee logo

The Dutch Restitutions Committee (Dutch: Restitutiecommissie) was established in 2001 to deal with claims for the restitution of Nazi-era looted works of art to their original owners or their descendants. The rulings of the committee have been controversial with some restitution advocates arguing that they are unfair to claimants.

== Criticisms ==
Of the five international Restitution Committees that exist (UK, France, Austria & Germany) the Dutch Restitution Committee has the lowest restitution rate, returning only about one third of the artworks claimed. Recently the Restitution Committee introduced the controversial Balance of Interest test, which takes into consideration the desire of the (typically government owned) museum to keep a looted artwork, rather than return it to the rightful claimants. This resulted in the Committee's refusal to restitute a number of important artworks and led to international criticism at what many viewed as a self-serving mechanism. Ambassador Stuart Eizenstat, the author of the Washington Principles, recently indicated at an international conference in Berlin, that the "Balance of Interest test in not in accordance with the Washington Principles" and indicated that this mechanism should no longer be used.

In 2020 a Dutch panel concluded that the restitution process was unduly complex and unfair to claimants. Taco Dibbits, the director of the Rijksmuseum, denounced the "balance of interest" policy to a bicycle thief who argues that he should be able to keep stolen property because he's using it.

In the face of sustained criticism, the Dutch Restitutions Committee reversed its former rulings in several cases.

== Presidents ==
- 2001‒2004: J. M. Polak
- 2004‒2007: B. J. Asscher
- 2007‒2008: R. Herrmann
- 2009‒2016: W. J. M. Davids
- 2016–present: A. Hammerstein

== See also ==
- Nederlands Kunstbezit-collectie (Netherlands Art Property Collection or NK collection)
- List of claims for restitution for Nazi-looted art
- Arthur Seyss-Inquart
- Erhard Göpel
- Hitler's Führermuseum
- Sonderauftrag Linz
- Richard Semmel
