= Richard Semmel =

German Jewish businessman and art collector (1875–1950)

- Born: September 15, 1875; Zobten am Berge, Silesia
- Died: December 2, 1950 (aged 75); New York

Richard Semmel (September 15, 1875 – December 2, 1950) was a German entrepreneur and art collector who was persecuted by the Nazis because of his Jewish heritage. His heirs have filed restitution claims for artworks.

== Life ==
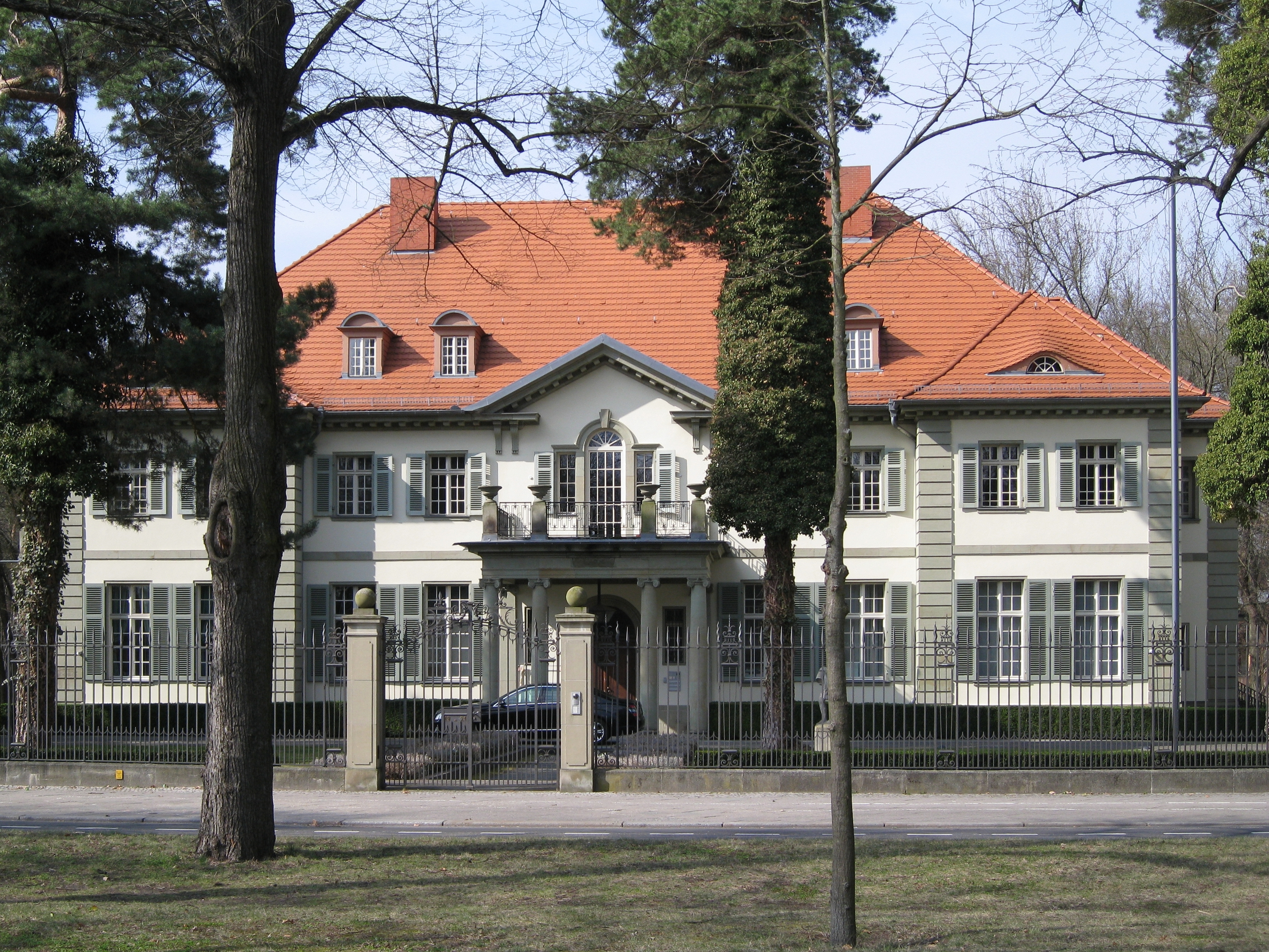
Richard Semmel house in Berlin-Dahlem

Richard Semmel was the owner of the textile company Arthur Samulon in Berlin. He was married to Clara Cäcilie, née Brück. They had no children. Semmel began building an art collection in the 1920s and had a large art collection by the early 1930s.

== Nazi persecution and flight ==
When the Nazis came to power in Germany on January 30, 1933, Semmel was persecuted as a Jew. He fled Germany for the Netherlands in 1933, selling some of his art collection at the Dutch auction house Frederik Muller & Cie. in Amsterdam on 13 June and 21 November 1933. When Nazi German occupied Holland, he fled again, arriving in New York in 1941. His business, Arthur Samulon, was transferred to a non-Jew (Aryanized) in 1934 and liquidated in 1939.

During the German occupation of the Netherlands, Semmel's brother died in the Dutch transit camp Westerbork. Semmel lived in impoverished conditions in New York and depended on the support of friends. He died there in 1950, declaring Grete Gross-Eisenstädt, a longtime family friend, as his heir.

Their grandchildren tried several times to achieve the restitution of artworks from the Richard Semmel collection.

In the future, a memorial stele in front of the former residence at Pacelliallee 19/21 in Berlin will commemorate his fate.

== The Art Collection of Richard Semmel ==
The exact size of Richard Semmel's art collection is not known. According to estimates, there were more than 120 paintings in the collection. On June 13, 1933 important nineteenth- and twentieth-century paintings were auctioned by Mensing & Fils (Frederik Muller & Cie) in Amsterdam. A second auction of 71 paintings followed on November 21, 1933. Some of Semmel's artworks were auctioned later in Switzerland while others remained in the Netherlands where they were confiscated in 1942 during the Nazi occupation. Semmel's collection featured Dutch Old Master paintings and works by French Impressionist and Post-Impressionist artists.

== Postwar claims for restitution ==
After the defeat of Nazi Germany, numerous attempts were made to recover artworks looted from Semmel or sold under duress. Artworks that were objects of restitution claims include:

- Portrait of a Young Man by an unknown artist, Amsterdam c. 1620 had been acquired by Richard Semmel in 1928 as a work by Thomas de Keyser. Via the Dutch art trade, it entered the collection of the Special Commission Linz in 1940 and was restituted- not to Semmel—but to the Netherlands after the Second World War. The work, which was also temporarily attributed to Werner van den Valckert, was in the Museum Gouda for several years. In 2009 it was restituted to the heirs of Richard Semmel by the Rijksdienst Beeldende Kunst, The Hague. After that the painting was sold on the art market.
- Riviergezicht met aanlegplaats by Maarten Fransz. van der Hulst (formerly attributed to Jan van Goyen) had been in the Groningen Museum since 1948. The painting was restituted to the heirs of Richard Semmel in 2013.
- Mary with Child by Jan van Scorel belonged to the Richard Semmel collection since 1926. In 1958, the Centraal Museum Utrecht acquired the painting. The Dutch Restitutiecommissie rejected restitution, emphasizing the special significance of the painting for the museum.
- Christ and the Samaritan Woman at the Well by Bernardo Strozzi was purchased at auction in Amsterdam in November 1933 by Dirk Hannema who donated it in 1964 to the Museum de Fundatie in Zwolle, which he founded. In 2013, the Restitutiecommissie rejected a restitution claim because of the importance of the painting. The decision was widely criticized. In 2021 the museum decided to pay compensation to the heirs.
- Head of a Man, formerly attributed to Vincent van Gogh, entered the collection of the National Gallery of Victoria in Melbourne in 1940. The museum decided in 2014 to restitute the painting to the heirs.
- La maison blanche by Paul Gauguin which was acquired by George Child Villiers, 9th Earl of Jersey from art dealer Alex. Reid & Lefevre on May 25, 1943, London, was the object of a settlement between the heirs of the Earl and the heirs of Richard Semmel. The painting was auctioned off at Christie's on February 4, 2014.
- La Route montante (the Road) by Paul Gauguin was auctioned on June 13, 1933, at the Frederik Muller auction house and acquired by Emil Georg Bührle in 1937 via the Galerie Max Moos in Geneva. It was transferred to the E. G. Bührle Collection Foundation in 1960. In 2024 the Kunsthaus Zurich removed the painting from display and announced that it was reaching a settlement.
- Paysage pres de Cagnes by Pierre-Auguste Renoir was also sold at auction on June 13, 1933, at the Frederik Muller auction house. In 1956 the painting entered the collection of the American steel manufacturer Newton Korhumel. Before the Korhumel heirs sold the painting at Christie's auction house in 2012 for $866,500 U.S. dollars, the painting was sold at the auction house. They had agreed on a financial compensation with the heirs of Richard Semmel.
- Study of a Peasant Girl Digging by Camille Pissarro was also sold on June 13, 1933, at the Frederik Muller auction house. After transiting though "Galerie Moos, Geneva, Jacques Lindon, New York, Private Collection, Monaco", it was sold at Sotheby's, London, on June 27, 1977, lot 19.
- Dune Landscape with Deer Hunt by Gerrit Claesz Bleker, claim for restitution by Frans Hals Museum in Haarlem, rejected by the Dutch Restitution Committee in a 2013 claim due to the "interest of museums to keep paintings over the rights of claimants to restitution".
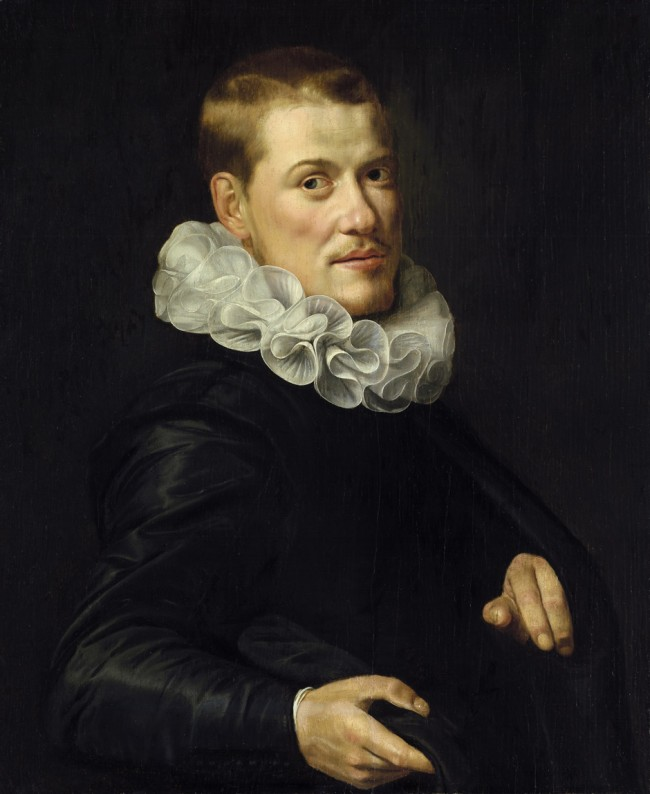
Niederländisch (Amsterdam):
Bildnis eines jungen Mannes, um 1620

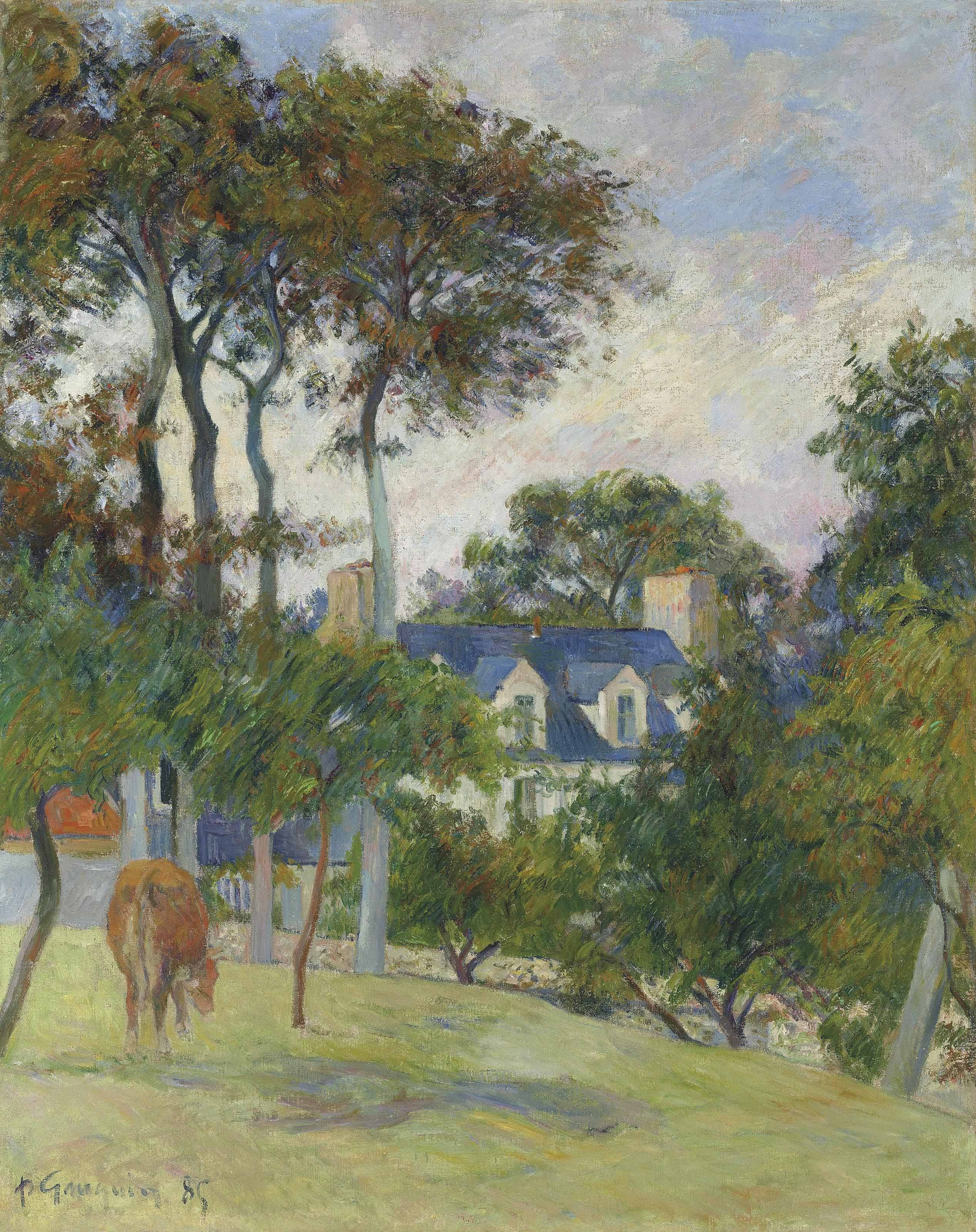
Paul Gauguin:
La maison blanche, 1885

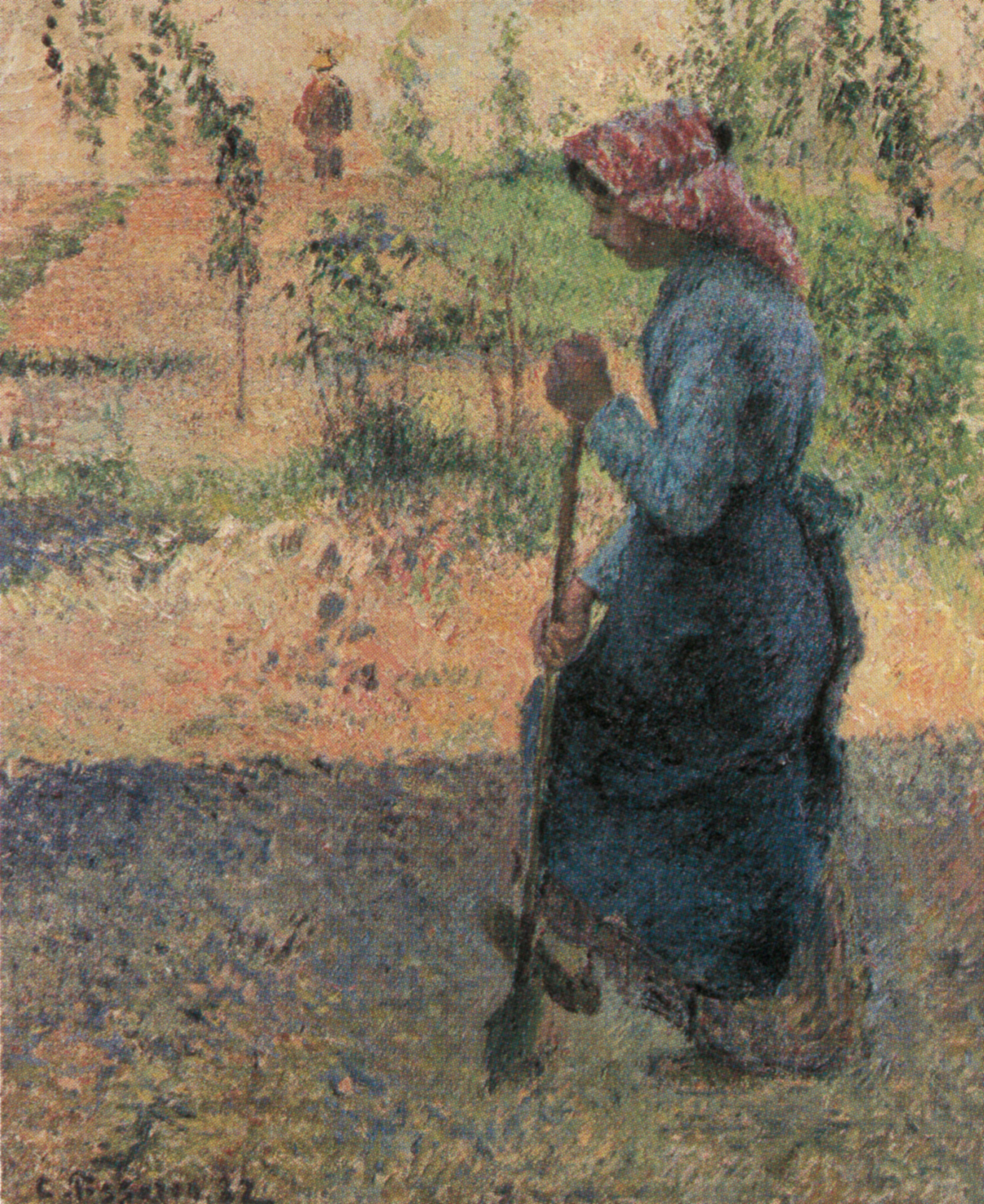
Camille Pissarro:
Studie eines Bauernmädchens beim Umgraben, 1882

== See also ==
- List of claims for restitution for Nazi-looted art
- Reich Flight Tax
- The Holocaust
- German Occupation of the Netherlands in World War II
- Aryanization
