= Ismar Littmann Art Collection =

Art collection

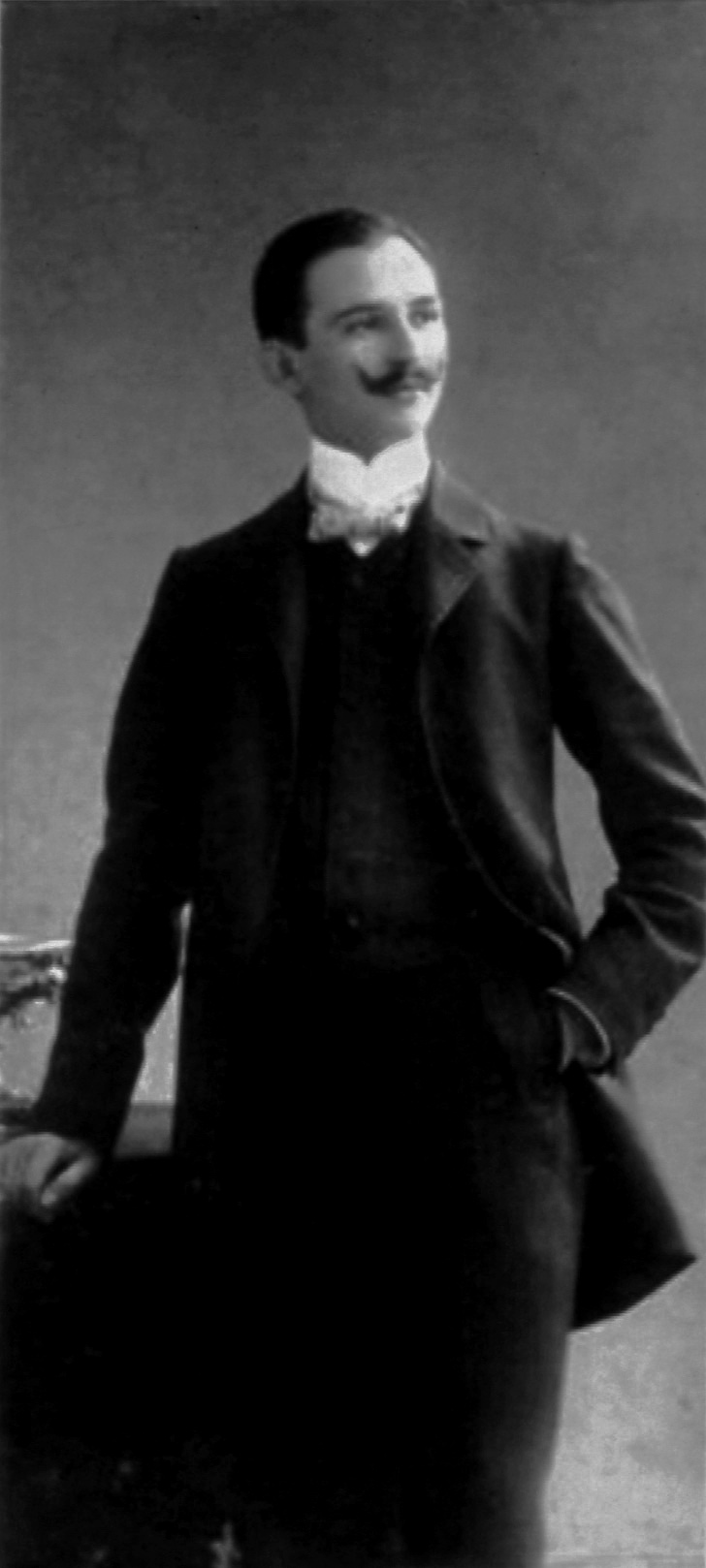
Ismar Littmann (1910)

The art collection of Ismar Littmann (1878–1934), a German lawyer who lived in Breslau, comprised 347 paintings and watercolors and 5,814 drawings from artists such as Lovis Corinth, Max Pechstein, Erich Heckel, Max Liebermann, Käthe Kollwitz, Lucien Adrion, and Otto Mueller.

== Collector ==
Ismar Littmann was a patron of cultural life in Breslau. He supported young artists, helped found the local Jewish Museum, served as a board member of the "Society of Friends of Art", and promoted modern art.

== Nazi persecution ==
After the Nazis came to power in 1933, Littmann was persecuted because he was Jewish. Banned from practicing law, socially and politically marginalized, and economically devastated, he died by suicide in 1934.

=== Forced sales and Gestapo seizures ===
To survive, Littmann's widow Käthe Littmann was forced to sell her possessions, including 156 works which were to be sold through the Max Perl auction house in Berlin. Two days before the auction, however, 64 works, including 18 from the Littmann collection, were confiscated by the Gestapo because of "typical cultural Bolshevik depiction of a pornographic character". The remaining 182 works were auctioned on February 26 and 27, 1935, but many were not sold and it is not known what became of them.

The 64 confiscated pictures were transferred to the Nationalgalerie in Berlin. The museum director, Eberhard Hanfstaengl, selected four paintings from the Littmann collection, and 14 watercolors for storage. The remaining works were said to have been burned on March 20, 1936, in the heating system of the Kronprinzenpalais. In 1937, four paintings from the Littmann collection were displayed at the infamous Nazi "Degenerate Art" exhibition in Munich, after which some were sold to raise cash for the Nazi regime.

== Restitution ==
Since the 1960s, Ismar Littmann's heirs have been demanding restitution of Littmann's art collection. In 1961 the confiscation of six paintings was recognized and in partial settlement compensation of 32,000 DM was paid. A second settlement concerning the Nazi seizure of 1177 artworks was concluded in 1965, with DM 12,000 in compensation. The inventories of the Littmann Collection were found at the end of the 1990s, and research has been carried out since then into the whereabouts of the collection.

Since 1999, on the basis of the Washington Declaration, six paintings and one drawing have been restituted to Littmann's heirs, however others have been refused, notably by the Lehmbruck Museum in Duisburg for an Emil Nolde. The heirs were able to identify a further seven works, which makes it clear that only 15 of the more than 6,000 works were found.

In 2021 "Buchsbaumgarten" a painting by Emil Nolde that had belonged to Ismar Littmann was auctioned at the Ketterer auction house, following a settlement agreement with the Lehmbruck Museum.

== Individual works ==
The four paintings that were shown in the exhibition "Degenerate Art" have the following provenance stories:

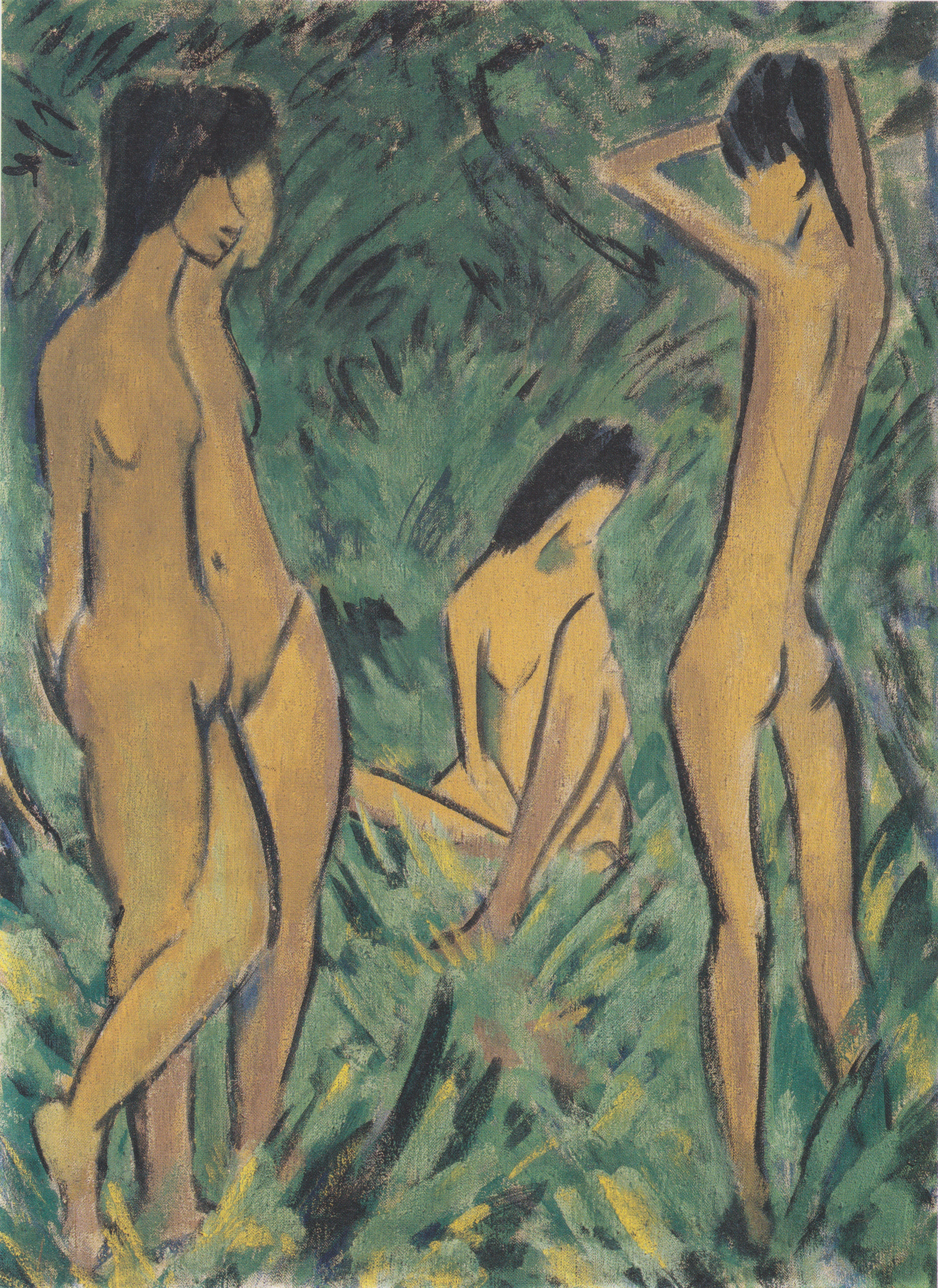
Otto Mueller: Knabe vor zwei stehenden und einem sitzenden Mädchen

- Otto Mueller: Knabe vor zwei stehenden und einem sitzenden Mädchen, Öl auf Leinwand, 1918/1919

In 1935 the painting was confiscated from the Perl auction house and then stored in the Kronprinzen-Palais in Berlin. The Güstrow art dealer Bernhard H. Boehmer bought it in 1940 from the inventory that had been declared usable. After a gap of 39 years in its provenance, it was sold to the publisher Henri Nannen for DM 260,000 in 1979 via the Achim Moeller Gallery, London, later it came to the Henri and Eske Nannen Foundation and was exhibited in the Kunsthalle Emden. Having become aware of the Littmann case through press reports, the Kunsthalle examined the provenance of the painting in 1998. After confirming that the picture came from the Littmann Collection, the Board of Trustees recommended restitution. The Friends of the Museum organized the repurchase of the work of art from the heirs for DM 1.2 million.

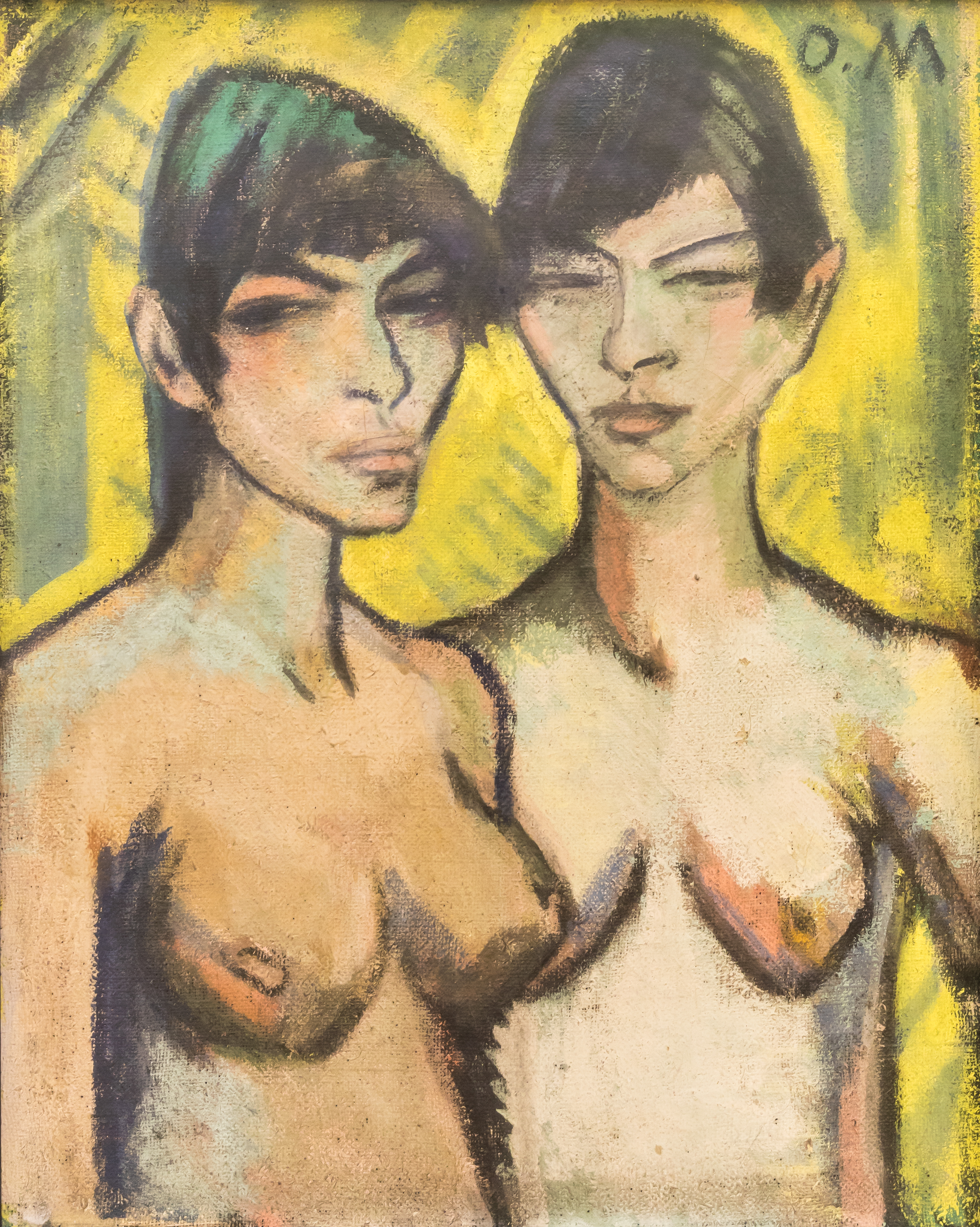
Otto Mueller: Zwei weibliche Halbakte

- Otto Mueller: Zwei weibliche Halbakte, Leimfarbe auf Rupfen, 1919

This painting, too, was confiscated from the Perl auction house in 1935, stored in the Kronprinzen-Palais in Berlin, and picked out in 1937 for the "Degenerate Art" exhibition. In 1939 the art dealer Hildebrand Gurlitt bought the work for US$150 and sold it on to the collector Josef Haubrich. The picture was donated to the city of Cologne through him in 1946. There it was exhibited in the Museum Ludwig. At the request of the heirs, the painting was restituted in 1999 in accordance with the Washington Declaration.

- Karl Hofer, Sitzender weiblicher Akt auf blauem Kissen, Öl auf Leinwand, 1927

The painting was confiscated from the Perl auction house in 1935, stored in the Kronprinzen-Palais in Berlin, and shown in the 1937 exhibition "Degenerate Art". The provenance history of this work is not publicly known; according to the coordination office in Magdeburg, it was restituted to the heirs in 2002.

- The fourth painting from the Littman Collection that was shown in the "Degenerate Art" exhibition was a nude by Franz Radziwill. Nothing is known about its whereabouts.

Other works from the Littmann Collection that have been restituted:

- Lucien Adrion, La Procession, Öl auf Leinwand, 1927

The picture was auctioned in 1935 by the Perl auction house in Berlin. In an unexplained way, it came into the possession of the judge and active resistance fighter against National Socialism, Ernst Strassmann. The Ernst Strassmann Foundation, which did not know its origin, put the painting in an auction at the Villa Grisebach in Berlin in November 2002. Upon publication, the work was identified by the Art Loss Register as part of the former Littman Collection. After the facts were announced, the foundation took it out of the auction and returned it to the heirs.

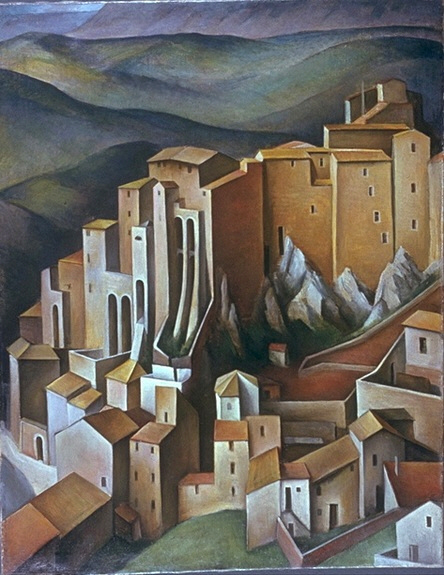
Alexander Kanoldt: Olevano

- Alexander Kanoldt: Olevano, Öl auf Leinwand, 1927

The painting was consigned to the Perl auction house in 1935, and in 1951 it was added to the collection of the National Gallery in Berlin. In February 2001 it was returned to the heirs according to the Washington Declaration.

- Lovis Corinth: Porträt Charlotte Corinth, Öl auf Leinwand, 1915

The painting came from the Perl auction house to the Berlin National Gallery after 1935 and was sold from there in 1940. It later came into the possession of the Hamburgische Landesbank, which wanted to sell it in an auction in November 2000. It was identified as looted art and returned to Littmann's heirs.

- Otto Mueller: Akt an Baum lehnend, Zeichnung

This drawing was identified as part of the Littmann Collection and restituted to the heirs by the Kupferstichkabinett Berlin in 2000.

Paintings found but not restituted:

- Emil Nolde, Buchsbaumgarten, Öl auf Leinwand, 1909

At the Max Perl auction in 1935, this painting was sold to Karl Arnold, also a Jew, for 350 ℛ︁ℳ︁. He died in October 1935, his family emigrated and were able to take the picture with them. It was auctioned off in 1956 by the Ketterer auction house in Stuttgart, the Lehmbruck Museum, Duisburg acquired it for DM 3,600. It is still there today. In April 2000, the city of Duisburg refused to return it on the grounds that one Jewish fate could not be played off against another. The museum declined to give advice to the Joint Commission in Magdeburg.

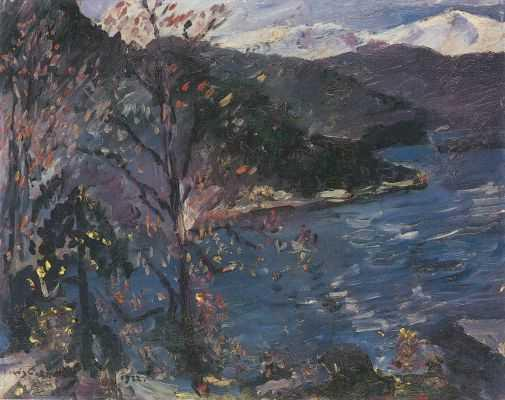
Lovis Corinth, Walchensee im Herbst (Sammlung Leo Lewin und Ismar Littmann).

- Inka Bertz, Michael Dorrmann (Hrsg.): Raubkunst und Restitution. Kulturgut aus jüdischem Besitz von 1933 bis heute. Herausgegeben im Auftrag des Jüdischen Museums Berlin und des Jüdischen Museums Frankfurt am Main, Frankfurt a. M. 2008, ISBN 978-3-8353-0361-4
- Koordinierungsstelle für Kulturgutverluste Magdeburg (Hrsg.): Beiträge öffentlicher Einrichtungen der Bundesrepublik Deutschland zum Umgang mit Kulturgütern aus ehemaligem jüdischen Besitz, Magdeburg 2001 (Veröffentlichungen 1), (S. 91 ff. und S. 172 ff.)
- Gunnar Schnabel, Monika Tatzkow: Nazi Looted Art. Handbuch. Kunstrestitution weltweit, Berlin 2007, ISBN 978-3-00-019368-2
- Lost Art Register: Sammlung Ismar Littmann
- Jüdisches Museum Berlin: Sammlung Ismar Littmann
- The Ismar Littman Collection, Holocaust Claims Processing Office (HCPO), Department Financial Services

== See also ==
- List of claims for restitution for Nazi-looted art
