= Valerie Eisler =

Jewish art collector

Valerie Vally Eisler (29 March 1886 in Vienna – after 11 January 1942 in Riga) was an Austrian Jewish art collector who was robbed and murdered by Nazis in the Holocaust.

== Early life ==
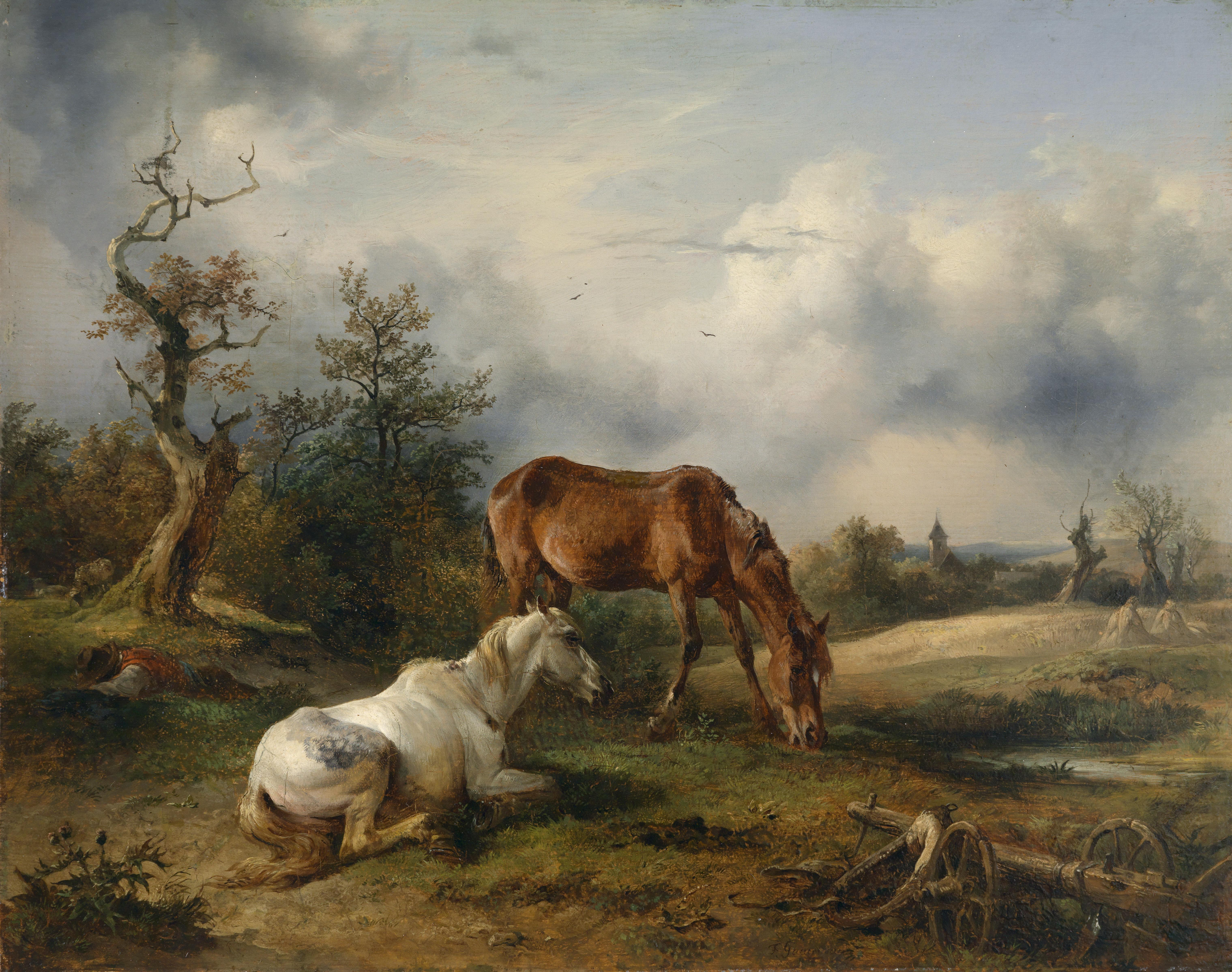
Zwei Pferde (ein Schimmel und ein Fuchs) auf der Weide by Friedrich Gauermann was restituted to the heirs of Valerie Eisler in 2012

Born in Vienna to Isak Ignatz Zwicker and Therese Zwicker, she married Alfred Eisler (1874-1937). The couple had an art collection that included among many other artworks painting by Thomas Ender. After the death of her husband Alfred in 1937, Valerie Eisler inherited his art collection, which included graphic art, primarily drawings and watercolors by Austrian artists of the 19th century.

== Nazi persecution after the Anschluss ==
Immediately after the 'Anschluss' of Austria with Nazi Germany in March 1938, the Eisler villa was 'Aryanized', that is, forcibly transferred to non-Jewish owners. The company, a wholesaler of beans, lentils and seeds, was liquidated by the Aryanization office known as the "Vermögensverkehrsstelle". Eisler had given the art collection to a forwarding agent for transfer abroad, but the most valuable graphic holdings were placed by the Nazi's Central Office for the Protection of Monuments in Vienna on the so-called "Reich List" in 1940, which banned their export. They were sold by the lawyer Dr. Morawetz.

Some of Eisler's art was acquired for Hitler's planned Führermuseum, others for the Albertina in Vienna. Most of Eisler's artworks were sent to the Neue Galerie of the Joanneum in Graz.

On 11 January 1942 the Nazis deported Valerie Eisler to Riga where she was murdered in the Holocaust.

Eisler had three sisters: Malvine Malva Weiss, Julius Zwicker, and Grete Zwicker.

== Restitution claims ==
Numerous restitution claims for artworks that had belonged to Valerie Eisler have been filed.

In 1953, there was a restitution settlement with the legal heirs of Valerie Eisler for View of the Castel San Zeno near Merano, c. 1845, by Thomas Ender.

The four drawings acquired for Hitler's Führermuseum were restituted to Eisler's heirs and acquired by the Dresden State Art Collections for the Kupferstich-Kabinett in 2014.

The Joanneum Museum Restitution Report offers descriptions of some of the artworks looted from the Eislers.

== See also ==
- The Holocaust in Austria
- Aryanization
- Dorotheum
- List of claims for restitution for Nazi-looted art
