= Oskar Federer =

Czech-Canadian Jewish industrialist and art collector

Oskar Federer (4 May 1884 in Jičín – 21 July 1968 in Canada) was a Czech-Canadian Jewish industrialist and art collector. Forced to flee from his native Czechoslovakia to Canada by the Nazis, his property and art collection were plundered first by Nazis and later by the communist regime in Czechoslovakia.

== Businessman ==
In the journal Theresienstädter Studien und Dokumente, Federer was described as "one of the most important and exciting personalities of the Czechoslovak economy in the interwar period".

Federer worked with the Viennese Rothschilds for over thirty years, and was the general director of the Vitkovice Mining and Ironworks Union, one of the largest industrial firms in the country.

== Art collector ==
Federer's art collection included works by Lovis Corinth, Claude Monet, and Paul Gauguin.

== Nazi persecution ==
Persecuted by the Nazis because of his Jewish heritage, he emigrated to Canada. Most of his property, including most of his art collection was confiscated by the Nazis. After the war, the paintings came into the possession of the Czechoslovak state.

== Legacy ==
The Canadian heirs of Oskar Federer filed restitution claims against several Czech galleries, obtaining the restitution of twenty paintings that belonged to Oskar Federer before the Second World War. Works included those by Edvard Munch, Oskar Kokoschka, Otakar Nejedlý and Antonín Slavíček. Oscar Federer's grandson demanded the return of the paintings in the early 1990s.

However, in 2009 the Czech "Federer collection" was auctioned at Sotheby's.

In 2003, historian Magda Veselská published a biography of Oskar Federer entitled Oskar Federer – businessman and art collector (Oskar Federer - Unternehmer und Kunstsammler).

== See also ==
- The Holocaust in Bohemia and Moravia
- List of claims for restitution for Nazi-looted art
