= Salomon Flavian =

Banker and art collector persecuted by Nazis because Jewish

Salomon Flavian (1892-1955) was a Jewish banker and art collector persecuted by the Nazis

== Early life and education ==
Born in Romania into a Jewish family in 1892, Flavian lived and worked in Paris.

== Art collection ==
Flavian collected art by numerous artists, including Gustave Courbet, Jean-Auguste-Dominique Ingres, Paul Guigou, Jean-Louis Forain, Eugene Boudin and many others. Included in Flavian's collection was a 1902 landscape by Camille Pissarro entitled The Port of Dieppe (Darse de pêche et bassin Duquesne)

== Nazi persecution ==
When Nazi Germany occupied France in 1940, Flavian and his family were plundered and persecuted under anti-Jewish racial laws. On May 2 1941 The Flavian art collection was seized by the Nazi looting organisation the Einsatzstab Reichsleiter Rosenberg (ERR)

== Postwar ==
Flavian searched for his art collection after the war. In the 1960s Charles Flavian led the initial claims for compensation.

== Sotheby's Nazi loot case ==
In 2024, one of the Flavian paintings which had been missing for decades, Pissaro's The Port of Dieppe, turned up at a Sotheby's auction in London where it was sold for £1.2 million (5 million NIS). A settlement had supposedly been reached by the seller with two descendants of Flavian, represented by the Canadian firm Mondex. When challenged by family members, Sotheby's argued both there was a settlement with heirs and "no proof" the artwork had been looted despite its publication in the France's postwar "Répertoire des biens spoliés". On September 27, 2026, seven Flavian's heirs filed a lawsuit contesting the Sotheby's sale, saying they had not been consulted in the supposed pre-sale "settlement" between the seller and family members.

In November 2026, a French court ordered the cancellation of Sotheby's sale and the restitution to Flavian's heirs
