= Oskar Reichel =

Austrian art collector

Oskar Reichel (1869 – 7 May 1943) was an Austrian physician and art collector. Works in his collection were confiscated by the Nazis during World War II, leading to restitution claims from his descendants.

== Early life ==
Reichel was born in 1869 in Vienna.

== Art collector ==
Reichel was a prominent collector of Austrian Expressionist art, including Egon Schiele, Max Oppenheimer, and Oskar Kokoschka. Reichel collected many artworks by Schiele and Kokoschka. Schiele painted a portrait of Reichel in 1910 as well as a black crayon drawing "Portrait Study of Dr. Oskar Reichel with Raised Left Hand" Other Schiele artworks owned by Reichel included "The Self-Seers" and Black Girl ( Girl in Black). Art by Kokoschka included "Two Nudes" and Susanne (1916).

== Persecution by the Nazis ==
When the Nazi persecution of Vienna's Jews began, with the Anschluss on 12 March 1938, Reichel and his wife Malvine remained in Vienna. Their home furnishings business was forced shut after the anti-Jewish attacks of Kristallnacht in 1938, and in 1941 the Nazis forced them to sell their shares in a family-owned building, with the proceeds going into blocked accounts that they could not access.

The Reichel's eldest son, Maximilian Reichel, born in 1900, was deported in a Transport from Poland to Lodz and murdered by the Nazis in 1942. On 7 May 1943, Oskar died. His widow, Malvine Reichel, was deported with Transport 46c from Vienna, Austria to Theresienstadt Ghetto, in Czechoslovakia on 11 January 1943.

Reichel’s two sons, Raimund and Hans fled to South America and the United States, respectively. Their mother, Malvine, survived Theresienstadt and joined her son Hans in the United States after the war.

== Claims for restitution ==
=== Museum of Fine Arts, Boston ===
In March 2007, Claudia Seger-Thomschitz, an heir to Jewish art collector Reichel, requested that the Museum of Fine Arts, Boston restitute Two Nudes, a 1913 painting Oskar Kokoschka that Reichel had owned prior to the Nazi Anschluss. She claimed that Reichel had sold the painting under duress in Nazi-occupied Vienna in 1939. The MFA responded that Reichel sold the painting voluntarily and "filed suit against her in January in US District Court for the District of Massachusetts to establish legal title to the painting," creating consternation among Holocaust experts.

Reichel's business and home were confiscated during World War II, and one of his sons was sent to a concentration camp, where he died. Reichel's wife was deported to a camp, but survived. "To suggest, at that period in Vienna, that there was no pressure is ridiculous," said professor Deborah E. Lipstadt, a Holocaust historian and former director of the Tam Institute for Jewish Studies at Emory University. "It's ludicrous."

The case was dismissed by the US court of Appeals which ruled that the claim was "time-barred".

=== Sarah Dunbar ===
In 2009, a restitution claim against Sarah Dunbar for the painting “Portrait of a Youth”, by Oskar Kokoschka, which Reichel had sold to art dealer Otto Kallir in Vienna in 1939 was also unsuccessful. The subject of the painting was Hans Reichel, son of Oskar Reichel. Dunbar’s lawyers, Thaddeus Stauber and Jennifer Borum Bechet, argued that "although the Reichel family had long ago sought reparations for property that was stolen by the Nazis, they never sought the return of the Hans portrait." The court ruled in Dunbar's favor and the Fifth Circuit Court of Appeals upheld the decision, stating that, under Louisiana law, Dunbar is the clear owner of the Kokoschka by “acquisitive prescription,” because she openly held the painting for 10 years.

=== Albertina Museum in Austria ===
In 2011, Austrian culture ministry's art restitution council told Vienna's Albertina art gallery to return six works by Anton Romako to Reichel's descendants on the grounds that his collection was lost due to persecution by the Nazis. The artworks included The Spring, Nike with Wreath and Young Girl, Nude.

== See also ==
- The Holocaust
- Aryanisation
- List of Claims for Restitution
- Vugesta
