= Maximilian Kellner =

Austrian art collector

Maximilian Kellner (5 February 1869 – 25 December 1940) was an Austrian art collector persecuted by the Nazis because of his Jewish heritage.

== Biography ==
Kellner was born on 5 February 1869 in Velké Meziříčí, Moravia. From 1932 he lived with his wife Katharina in the 2nd district of Vienna. The Kellner family company, founded in 1912, was headquartered in Rosice near Brno. Maximilian and his brothers Arnold (1864-1939) and Heinrich Kellner (born around 1862) were partners.

Kellner collected Austrian, French, and English portrait miniatures from the 19th century and paintings by old masters of the 17th century. His brother-in-law was Otto Kuhn (1865–1927), an entrepreneur and art collector. In 1929, Kellner sold a part of his collection anonymously, as 'the Gallery of a Viennese Collector', at Rudolph Lepke's auction house in Berlin.

== Nazi era ==
After Austria merged with Nazi Germany in the Anschluss of March 1938, Maximilian and Käthe Kellner were persecuted under anti-Jewish racial laws. Maximilian Kellner died in Vienna in December 1940. Käthe lived on Praterstrasse until May 1942. She was deported to the Izbica ghetto on the Gestapo's 20th transport and was murdered in the Holocaust. Their assets were seized by Hitler's German Reich.

== Restitution claim ==
In 2014 the advisory board recommended the restitution of a gouache by Philippe Berger from the Albertina to the heirs to Maximilian and Käthe Kellner. The Albertina acquired it in 1954 from the Viennese antique dealer Melanie Penizek.
