= Mondex Corporation =

Art restitution firm

Mondex Corporation is a Toronto-based company for the restitution of art and cultural artifacts looted during the Holocaust era. The company advocates on behalf of heirs to recover stolen art, and its practices have led to changes in restitution law and practices in various countries. Mondex was founded in 1993 by James Palmer. It is currently headed by Kamila Gourdie, who has served as the company's president since 2004.

Most of Mondex’s work is conducted under the auspices of the Washington Principles of Nazi-Confiscated Art (1998), which opened a new era of claims for restitution by the owners of looted art and their heirs. The Washington Principles were further supported by the United States’ Holocaust Expropriated Art Recovery Act of 2016, which ensured that the restitution of Nazi-confiscated art was not unfairly prevented by previously existing statutes of limitations.

To date Mondex’s work and advocacy has led to the discovery and restitution of dozens of artworks looted during the Holocaust era, primarily in Europe and the United States. The firm works by commission, taking a percentage of the restored artifact's value.

== Noted cases ==
=== Kandinksy's Painting With Houses and Changes to Dutch Restitution Practices ===
Mondex’s advocacy on behalf of the heirs of Wilhelmine and Robert Lewenstein, as well as Irma Klein Lewenstein, relatives of the Dutch Jewish art collector Emanuel Lewenstein and owners of Wassily Kandinsky’s Painting with Houses (Bild mit Häusern, 1909), led to the restitution of the painting and to a landmark change in the way Dutch governmental authorities assess restitution claims.

Mondex initially brought the claim on behalf of the heirs in 2013, seeking the return of a painting that had been involuntarily sold in The Netherlands in 1940, while the country had been occupied by the Nazis. The claim was contested by The City of Amsterdam and The Stedelijk Museum, which housed the canvas, and in 2018 government arbitrators decided in favour of the museum, arguing, among other points, that the heirs had “no special bond” with the painting, whereas the work “has a significant place” in the public museum.

In 2016, the Dutch government established the Kohnstamm Committee to review its restitution policies. Mondex, in collaboration with the Dutch law firm Van Diepen Van Der Kroef Advocaten and several other parties, gave feedback to this committee about the problems of The Netherlands’s framework for the assessment of restitution claims. In December 2020, the Kohnstamm Committee published their report “Striving for Justice,” which contained an evaluation of the country’s restitution policies. Among other recommendations, the Committee urged an end to the so-called "balance-of-interest" test, which was one of the main reasons the government arbitrators rejected the initial restitution claim for Painting with Houses. The Committee’s new recommendations, which were incorporated into a 2021 Decree, further included the key principle that “unless the facts expressly show otherwise, when assessing restitution applications concerning private individuals who belonged to a persecuted population group, we [will] assume that the loss of possession was involuntary.”

Amsterdam’s mayor expressed agreement with the findings of the report and in the Summer of 2021 the City of Amsterdam entered into mediation with the heirs, which led to the restitution of the Kandinsky painting to its rightful owners in February 2022.

=== Chagall's Le Père and New Legal Precedent in France ===
In 2015 Mondex began researching the case of Marc Chagall’s Le Père (1911), a painting stolen from the violin maker David Cender in Poland in 1940 by the invading Nazis. Cender survived the war and emigrated to France in 1958, he submitted a request for war loss compensation from the government of West Germany, but was unsuccessful. Sometime between the late 1940s and early 1950s, Chagall himself reacquired the artwork, presumably without knowing its provenance, and in 1988 Le Père was donated by Chagall’s heirs to the Musée National d'Art Moderne in Paris. Ten years later, it was deposited into the holdings of the Paris Museum for the Art and History of Judaism, on the occasion of the museum’s opening.

In 2020, Mondex located the painting at this museum and submitted a restitution claim, which was accepted. However, in order to complete the restitution, the company continued advocating on behalf of Cender’s heirs for the creation of a legal exception to France’s standard practice of not deaccessioning artworks in state museums. This exception came to be when the Assemblée Nationale passed a bill pertaining to the restitution of Le Père and fourteen other artworks, on February 21, 2022.

In 2023, Mondex arranged for Le Père to be displayed in the New York Jewish Museum’s exhibit of art looted during the Holocaust Era.

=== Modigliani's Seated Man With a Cane, An Ongoing Case ===
In 2010 Mondex’s research team began following traces of Amedeo Modigliani’s 1918 painting, Seated Man With a Cane, on behalf of the heir of the painting’s owner, Oscar Stettiner, who had fled from Paris in 1939, prior to the German invasion. During the occupation, the Nazis looted the contents of Stettiner’s antiques shop and private residence, which included Seated Man With a Cane. In 1944, a few months before France was liberated, the painting was sold at an illegal auction. Immediately after the war, a French court ruled that the buyer at the illegal auction, the art dealer Jean van der Klip, must return the painting to the rightful owner, Oscar Stettiner, but van der Klip falsely claimed that he no longer owned the painting. Oscar Stettiner died in 1948.

Research by Mondex proved that Seated Man With a Cane remained in possession of Jean van der Klip’s family until it was sold by his descendants at an auction by Christie’s in 1996, where it was acquired by an entity called the International Art Center (IAC). Research by Mondex into the sale and subsequent public showings of the painting by IAC indicated the entity was entirely owned by David Nahmad and his family, one of the most significant owners of impressionist and modern art in the world. The Nahmad family denied owning the painting, stating they operated but did not own IAC and its collection, but Mondex’s claims were confirmed by the 2016 leak of the Panama Papers.

Subsequent to the leak, David Nahmad claimed the Modigliani in his possession was a different Modigliani painting, not the painting stolen from Stettiner, but Mondex then uncovered documentation in a Paris archive indicating that Nahmad indeed possessed Stettiner’s painting, and furthermore that this information was known to Sotheby’s in 2008 when IAC approached the auction house to sell the artwork.

The case for the restitution of the painting has proceeded with several interruptions through the New York Courts and a resolution is expected within the next two years.
