= Gustave Florentin Garraux =

Swiss painter

Gustave Florentin Garraux (October 2, 1859 – 7 June 1950) was a Swiss painter, illustrator and visual artist.

== Biography ==
Garraux attended primary school in Solothurn and then had received a commercial apprenticeship in a large Basel company. He then traveled all over Switzerland as a traveling salesman. After his marriage in the year 1889, he ran a grocery shop in Moutier for 38 years. In parallel to his humble commercial venture, he created an extensive collection of postcards for which he is primarily famous. His works were first shown in 1909 in the Kunstmuseum Bern. In the mid-1910s, Garraux took lessons from Philippe Ritter, professor of drawing at the "Musée d'art industriel de Berne". In 1927 he gave up his business and moved to Bern and later to Langenthal, where he completely devoted himself to his art. His artistic produces mostly involved postcard-sized pictures with humorous content, depicting people in historical costumes. He used to illustrate his private correspondence with small watercolors.

== Death ==
He spent his old age at the Lindenhof in Langenthal and died there at the age of 90 on 7 June 1950.

== Works ==
- Florentin Garraux collection in the Musee du Tour Automatique et d'Histoire in Moutier.
- Book illustrations.

== Exhibitions ==
- 1909: in the Kunstmuseum Bern, in Solothurn, Pruntrut and Lausanne
- 1913: à l'Exposition cantonale de Zurich
- 1922: in Delémont
- 1994: in the Musée jurassien des Beaux-Arts de Moutier.
