= Koordinierungsstelle für Kulturgutverluste =

Institute documenting Nazi looted art

The Koordinierungsstelle für Kulturgutverluste (English: "Coordination Center for Lost Cultural Assets"), also known as the Koordinierungsstelle Magdeburg (English: "Magdeburg Coordination Center"), is an institution of the German federal and state governments at the Saxony-Anhalt Ministry of Culture and is the central German institution for the documentation of lost and found cultural assets looted by the Nazis. Established in 2001, the Koordinierungsstelle's Lost Art Database documents and publishes lost and found reports by institutions and private individuals. It operates on a cooperative basis with the international Art Loss Register.

== History ==
The Koordinierungsstelle was first established in 1994 in Bremen as an institution for the German states to document the institutional losses of cultural goods during the Second World War. The center thereby took over an operation that was carried out by German Ministry of the Interior since the 1950s. Originally they dealt with artworks left behind during the flight and expulsion of ethnic Germans between 1944 and 1950. Only after 1990 was looted art, defined as cultural goods seized illegally by German authorities during National Socialism, included in the center's documentation.

In 1998, the Koordinierungsstelle für Kulturgutverluste moved to Magdeburg with newly extended responsibilities and financed half by the German Federal Government and half by all of the state governments. It is an official central German institution, whose administrative and technical supervision is in the Saxony-Anhalt Ministry of Culture. Since 2010 its official name is Koordinierungsstelle Magdeburg - Eine Einrichtung des Bundes und der Länder für Kulturgutdokumentation und Kulturgutverluste beim Kultusministerium des Landes Sachsen-Anhalt (English: "The Magdeburg Coordination Center - An institution of the federal and state governments for cultural documentation and lost cultural assets of the Saxony-Anhalt Ministry of Culture").

== Tasks ==
Its main task is, in accordance with the requirements of the 1998 Washington Principles on Nazi-Confiscated Art and the 1999 German "general declaration," to document international lost and found registrations relating to cultural goods seized by the Nazis (Raubgut or "stolen art") as well cultural objects taken in the war (Beutegut or "looted art"). This task has been carried out since 2001 on the searchable Lost Art Database, which is accessible at no cost on the internet. The stated aim of the Lost Art Database is:

To record cultural property that went missing from public institutions or private individuals and institutions as a result of the Nazi rule and the Second World War by publicizing it on the Lost Art Internet Database for worldwide search availability. Owners or managers of cultural assets with uncertain or incomplete provenances can research here to determine if someone else is looking for these items.

The Koordinierungsstelle has a comprehensive set of policy instruments for public relations, such as organizing professional and educational events, publishing a series of scholarly books, providing checklists for provenance research, and operating an advisory commission in connection with the return of Nazi-looted art. It offers a website that is, on the one hand, the world's largest database for documenting objects of Nazi-looted art, and on the other hand providing an extensive information portal on these issues.

Furthermore, the Koordinierungsstelle is responsible for the electronic version of the German national inventory of valuable cultural property according to Paragraph 2 Subsection 2 of the German cultural assets protection law.

== Critical reception ==
The Lost Art Database has been criticized in the press for publishing photographs of the paintings seized in 2012 from Cornelius Gurlitt, stating that the legal basis for publishing images of a private citizen's personal property without their express permission is a violation of their privacy. The fact that the Lost Art Database posts information about looted art on its website without actively researching its provenance has led to criticism in the press, in that it puts "the burden of identifying stolen paintings in private collections... on aging Holocaust survivors and their relatives."

The Berlin political scientist Sebastian Neubauer registered a painting by Gustave Doré on the Lost Art Database in 2009 that he is sure was stolen by his father in German-occupied France. Neubauer was reportedly told by a Koordinierungsstelle staff member that "if nobody responds, then he can be happy and keep the painting." Neubauer responded in the Süddeutsche Zeitung, Germany's largest daily newspaper, that "there is apparently no competent contact partners and no institutional support for the private restitution of art in this country (Germany)."

== Future developments ==
In October 2014 the German Federal Government announced the reformation of the Koordinierungsstelle's Lost Art Database into a new foundation called the Deutsches Zentrum Kulturgutverluste (English: "German Center for Lost Cultural Assets"), which will put the Lost Art Database, the Arbeitsstelle für Provenienzforschung (English: "Center for Provenance Research") in Berlin, the Taskforce of the Munich artworks discovery, and the Research Center for Degenerate Art of the Free University of Berlin under one roof. The stated goal of this reformation is to promote the active research and restitution of Nazi-looted cultural assets. The general reception of this announcement in the press was skeptical, with the Frankfurter Allgemeine, a major German daily newspaper, commenting: "It shouldn't be about creating new positions in a new place for officials who thus far haven't been doing their job."

== See also ==
- Looted art
- Provenance research
