= Fritz Salo Glaser =

German Jewish lawyer and art collector (1876–1956)

Fritz Salo Glaser was a German Jewish art collector.

== Life ==
Born in Zittau in 1876, Glaser trained as a lawyer. He fought in World War I.

== Art collection ==
Glaser collected works by Otto Dix, Paul Klee, Wassily Kandinsky, Kokoschka, Schmidt-Rottluff and Emil Nolde, all artists considered "degenerate" by the Nazis. He also had artworks by Bernhard Kretschmar, Otto Griebel and Conrad Felixmüller.

== Nazi persecution ==
When the Nazis came to power in 1933, Glaser was persecuted due to his Jewish heritage. Expelled from his profession due to antisemitic laws, he was also refused the benefits due to him as a veteran. He was arrested.

Shortly before the Nazis planned to deport him to Theresienstadt from Dresden, Allied warplanes bombed the city, and Glaser managed to escape.

== The Gurlitt discovery ==
Numerous artworks discovered in the stash hidden in the apartment of Cornelius Gurlitt, the recluse son of Hitler's art dealer Hildebrand Gurlitt, were thought by authorities to have belonged to Glaser.

== See also ==
- List of Claims for Restitition for Nazi-looted art
- The Holocaust
- Degenerate art
- Munich art hoard
