= Euromuse =

euromuse.net is an exhibition web portal, that, being a project of certain European museums, informs about the exhibitions of that museums, that mostly are based on cultural history and the history of arts of Europe.

== Content ==
The portal collects information about exhibitions, institution and collections of European museums on its website. In February 2014 information about 540 museums from 28 countries were collected. These museums are, for example the Louvre (Paris), the Uffizi (Florence), the Berlin State Museums (Berlin) and the Jewish Museum in Prague. All information about exhibitions and museums can be read in English and the national language of the museum.

The portal was developed by the National Gallery (London), the Musée du Louvre (Paris), the Réunion des Musées Nationaux, Paris, the Museum of Art History (Vienna), the Rijksmuseum (Amsterdam), the Statens Museum for Kunst (Kopenhagen) and the Berlin State Museums.

In an online database, there is the possibility to research current exhibitions and over 2.970 past exhibitions. Also it includes information related to the educational and online offerings of the participating institutions.

The editing of euromuse.net takes place at the Institute for Museum Research in Berlin. Each member manages their own data to be published in euromuse.net.
