= Armand Dorville =

French art collector (1875–1941)

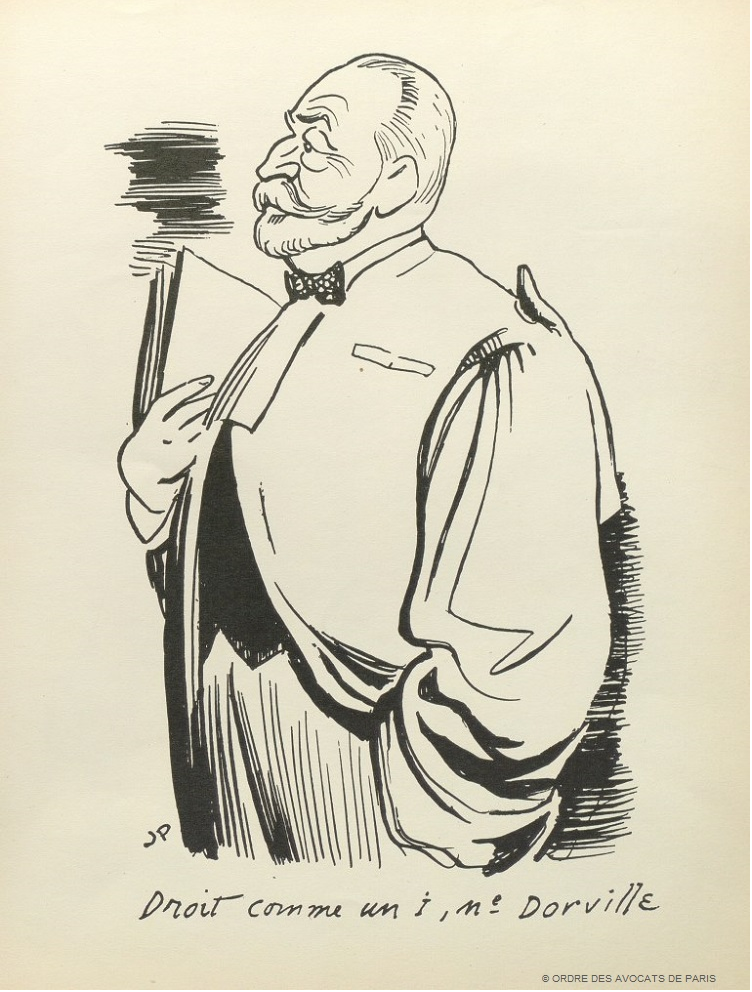
Drawing of Armand Dorville

Armand Dorville (French pronunciation: [aʁmɑ̃ dɔʁvil]; 1875–1941) was a French art collector and lawyer whose art collection was plundered during the Nazi occupation of France.

== Early years ==
Armand Isaac Dorville was born in 1875 into a family belonging to the old Parisian bourgeoisie.

His great-grandfather, Alexis Francfort adopted the name Dorville in 1808. His father Léon Albert Dorville was a banker and director of the Bienfaisante israélite, a mutual aid society founded by his own father, Armand Théophile Dorville, in 1843. His mother, Léonie Monteaux, came from a family of bankers from Avignon, established in Paris since the beginning of the Restoration.

After graduating from the Condorcet and Janson de Sailly high schools, Armand Dorville studied law and was admitted to the Paris Court of Appeals in 1897, earning his doctorate in law in 1901. He was awarded the thesis prize in 1902 for his thesis, De l'intérêt moral dans les obligations, étude de droit comparée sur le principe de réparation pécuniaire des dommages non-économiques (Paris, A. Rousseau, 1901). He became secretary of the Conference of Lawyers (1903-1904) and began his career as an associate of Jean Cruppi.

== Art Collector ==
Armand Dorville's art collection included 450 works by Bonnard, Vuillard, Renoir, Manet, Signac, Caillebotte, Daumier, Degas, Vallotton, Delacroix, Rodin, Carpeaux and also an artist he particularly liked, Constantin Guys.

== Persecution during the Occupation of France ==
When Nazi Germany invaded France in 1940, and anti-Jewish laws were imposed, Dorville took refuge in Cubjac, in Périgord, where he died in 1941.

His estate which included furniture, paintings, drawings, sculptures, books and manuscripts, was put up for auction. Under the title "a Parisian amateur's cabinet", the main part, from June 24 to 27, 1942 at the Hotel Savoy in Nice, included 450 works by Bonnard, Vuillard, Renoir, Manet, Signac, Caillebotte, Daumier, Degas, Vallotton, Delacroix, Rodin, Carpeaux and Constantin Guys.

The Commissariat-General for Jewish Affairs (Commissariat aux questions juives) sent an administrator, Amédée Croze, who informed the auctioneer that he would seize the proceeds, which exceeded nine million francs. The Dorville family received nothing at the time. Dorville's sister Valentine, his two daughters and his two granddaughters, aged two and four died in deportation to Auschwitz.

The Louvre's René Huyghe, who knew the collection belonged to Dorville, bought twelve lots with French government funds for France's museums.

The paintings were hung in French museums, and the story remained secret for seventy years until the French researcher Emmanuelle Polack was hired in 2020 by the Louvre to investigate the provenance of its artworks and immediately found ten Nazi-looted paintings in its collections.

== Claims for restitution ==
Some artworks from Dorville's collection turned up in the stash of Cornelius Gurlitt, the son of one of Hitler's official art dealers, Hildebrand Gurlitt. On January 22, 2020 in Berlin, in the presence of Monika Grütters, German Minister of Culture, two paintings by the painter Jean-Louis Forain (1852-1931) and one by Constantin Guys (1802-1892) were to be officially returned to Dorville's heirs.

In 2021, two private collectors from Nice returned a small painting attributed to de Nittis to Dorville's heirs

As of March 2021 French museums still held eighteen artworks from the Dorville collection. Other paintings, including Henri Fantin-Latour's Still Life with Roses and Fruit, acquired at the Hotel de Savoy, Nice auction in 1942, are currently in European or American museums or in private collections.

The Louvre restituted to the Dorville family the twelve paintings purchased directly by Huyghes at the 1942 Hotel de Savoy Nice auction. However, according to The Art Newspaper, the official position of the French state is that the Dorville auction was not linked to Nazi persecution of Jews and that there is no reason for restitution:

"Once again, French museums are heading to court over their refusal to restitute works of art claimed by Jewish families persecuted by the Nazis. On Friday, attorney Corinne Hershkovitch summoned the Musée du Louvre and Musée d'Orsay, as well as France's culture ministry and four provincial museums, demanding the restitution of 21 works from the collection of Armand Isaac Dorville. The state claims that the objects were not looted but sold in an estate sale after Dorville's death.

In October 2021 Berlin’s Alte Nationalgalerie restituted the Camille Pissarro painting, "A Square in La Roche-Guyon" (1867) to the Dorville heirs, and then purchased it back from them as it was a "core holding".

Paintings from the Dorville collection ended up in several American museums, including in the Minneaopolis Institute of Art, The Yale University Art Gallery and the Metropolitan Museum of Art in New York.

In 2024 UNC-Chapel Hill’s Ackland Art Museum restituted the painting The Studio of Thomas Couture, (L'atelier du Maître / The Master's workshop).

== See also ==
- Vichy anti-Jewish legislation
- The Holocaust in France
- List of claims for restitution for Nazi-looted art
- Lost Art-Database
