= Art collection of Adolf Hitler =

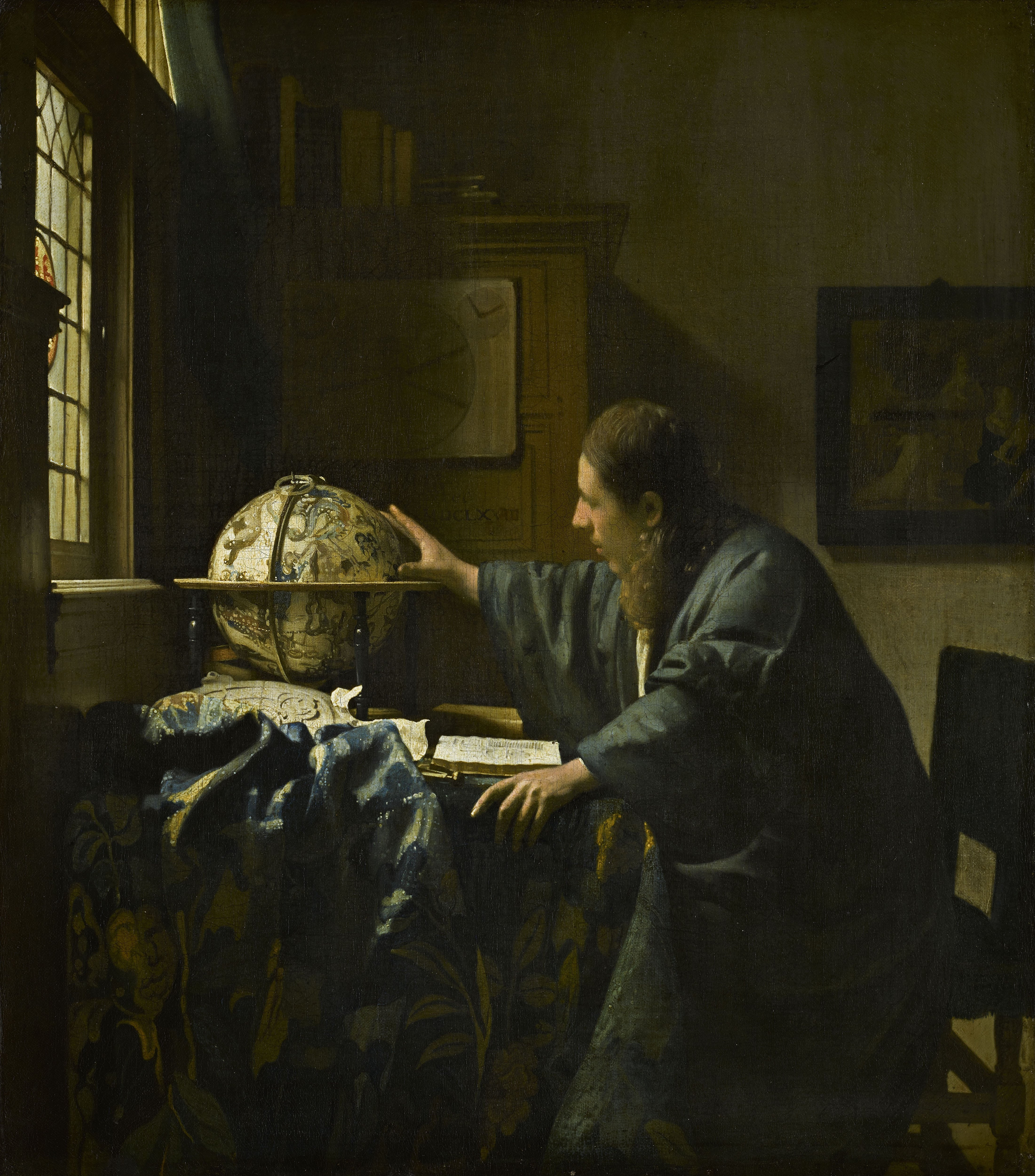
The Astronomer by Jan Vermeer, 1668. This painting was one of Hitler's personal favorites.

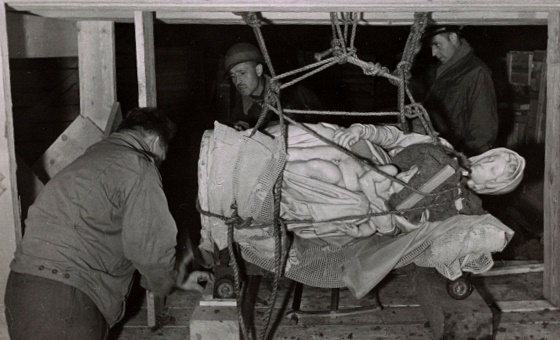
Madonna of Bruges was intended for the Fuhrermuseum

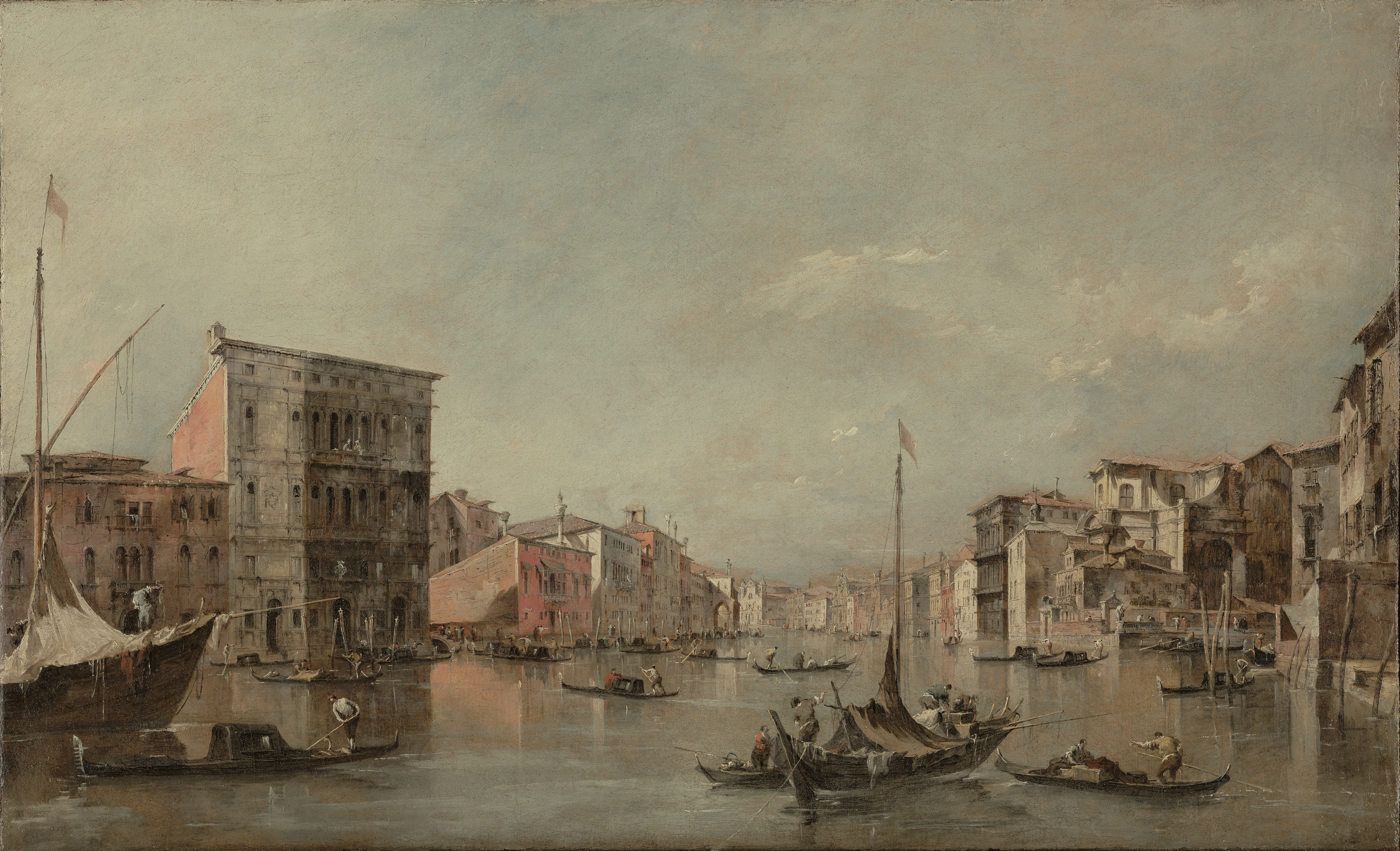
This painting was intended to be hung in the Fuhrermuseum

Adolf Hitler's art collection was a large accumulation of paintings which he gained before and during the events of WWII. These paintings were often taken from existing art galleries in Germany and Europe as Nazi forces invaded. Hitler planned to create a large museum in Linz called the Führermuseum to showcase the greatest of the art that he acquired. While this museum was never built, that did not stop Hitler and many other Nazi officials from seizing artwork across Europe. The paintings that the Nazis acquired were often stored in salt mines and castles in Germany during World War II. Eventually, many of these works of art would be rescued by a group called the Monuments Men. While this task force of art dealers and museum specialists were able to retrieve many of the stolen works of art, there are still many paintings that have yet to be found. In 2013, Cornelius Gurlitt, a son of one of Hitler's art dealers, was found with an apartment full of paintings which his father had kept from both the Nazis and the Monuments Men. This discovery of paintings has brought to light once more many paintings that were considered lost.

== Hitler's connection with the arts ==
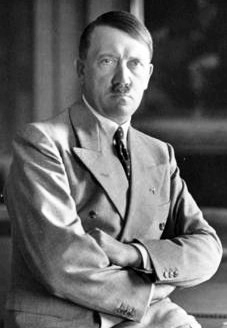
Adolf Hitler

Adolf Hitler was born on April 20, 1889, in Austria. At an early age, Hitler showed interest in the arts. His father hated the idea of his son becoming an artist instead of a government official like himself. Hitler's father tried to beat the idea out of him every time art or anything related was brought up. This cycle went on for years until his father died suddenly. After his father's death, Hitler felt free to do as he pleased. His mother encouraged him to apply to the famous school of the arts in Vienna, the Akademie. He was rejected twice, in 1907 and 1908. His applications were dismissed, and the director suggested he should apply to the School of Architecture instead, but he did not have sufficient academic qualifications to do so.

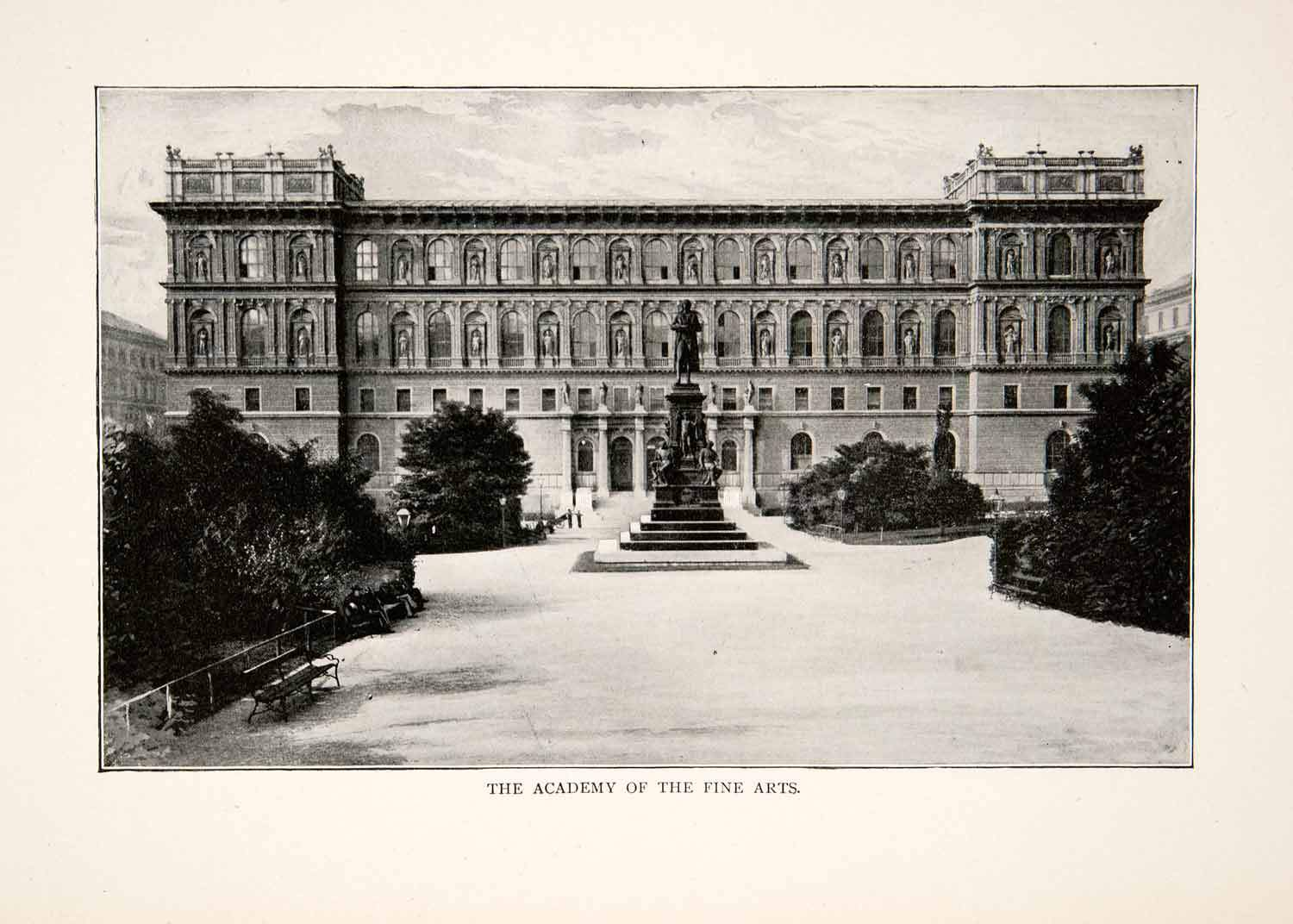
The Art Akademie in Vienna

Hitler retained an interest in art after he became chancellor in 1933. He used his absolute power to root through thousands of museums across Europe collecting, stealing, and assembling a massive collection of artwork. In 1937, Hitler opened a museum. The Great German Art Exhibition, the museum known as Degenerate Art, opened to a limited audience containing the first of his collection. This was his first step in his art collection. The ERR (Einsatzstab Reichsleiter Rosenberg) was ordered to empty and loot museums to gather art for Hitler's growing collection. This organization told the people they were taking the art into safe keeping but in reality, these painting were being used in museums across Germany as well as Hitler and other official's use. His administration was responsible for the appropriation of thousands of pieces. His collection was the largest art theft in history.

== Art galleries in Nazi Germany ==
In the late 1930s when the Nazi party took over power in Germany, the Nazis created a "Day of German Art" to celebrate Ayran culture. In his 1937 opening speech for the first Day of German Art, Hitler addressed the crowd and talked of acceptable and unacceptable art. Hitler and his followers appreciated traditional works of art that included paintings and sculptures and approved art that depicted the values of the Reich; hard work, fatherland, and family. This exhibition only showcased art that supported the Nazi regime. Any art that did not support the Nazi ideal was labeled as degenerate.

In addition to creating museums full of paintings and sculptures that supported approved German standards, the Nazis also created an exhibit to showcase all the art they considered degenerate. Any art that was modern or abstract was considered degenerate. In addition to showcasing this art and labeling it as degenerate art, the Nazi party also provided explanations to the art viewers as to why the art was a lesser form of art. In the 1937 speech, Adolf Hitler mentioned many types of art that the Reich was opposed to.

"Cubism, Dadaism, Futurism, Impressionism, and so on, have nothing to do with our German people. For all of these terms are neither old nor modern, but are simply the stilted stammering of people to whom God has denied real artistic talent and has given instead the gift of blather and deception. I therefore wish to affirm in this hour my immutable resolve to do for German artistic life what I have done in the area of political confusion: to purge it of empty phrases". -Adolf Hitler, July 18, 1937

In contrast to the Degenerate Art Gallery, Hitler also made plans to build a giant art museum called the Fuhrermuseum. In this museum he planned to exhibit the many artworks that he acquired. Many of the acquired works were taken in raids during the war. When Germany invaded Austria, there were many raids on the wealthiest families in the city. These families included the Rothschilds, Gutmanns, Bloch-Bauers, and Bondy's. Many of these families artworks were planned to be housed in the Fuhrermuseum. Because Hitler loathed Vienna, he made plans to make Linz, in his home country Austria, the center of the Third Reich. He planned to make the city into a large metropolis and at the center was to be a colossal art museum. This museum was to be so large that it would necessitate the moving of the railroad 4 kilometers in order to make room for it. Hitler disliked the Louvre's style of showcasing paintings where many paintings were all grouped together and instead made the Fuhrermuseum's blueprints as large as possible so each painting would have its own spotlight.

== Art thefts across Europe ==
Art Unit Report Number

On June 30, 1940, a note was given to a German military commander that had orders from the Fuhrer to remove "all art objects and historic documents belonging to individuals and Jews in particular [and to place them] into safekeeping". Not long after this order was issued, raids began on Jewish art collections and galleries.

It was not long after this that raids on other galleries ensued. The Germans began to track down famous paintings across Europe. Many museums and wealthy families began to be targeted by the ERR (Einsatzstab Reichsleiter Rosenberg) in late 1940 and early 1941. This organization posed such a large threat that the Louvre and the London Museum sent many of their most prized works into hiding and emptied the museums to protect them from the invading German forces. One family that was targeted for their art collection was the Rothschilds. This family had an extensive art collection from which the Nazis pillaged many famous works from in order to send to German Museums, including Hitler's own private Fuhrerbau collection. Another man that was targeted by the ERR was Paul Rosenberg. Rosenberg had a well-established art gallery that housed many famous works of art. He also had good connections with many famous painters including Braque, Matisse and Picasso. Because of these good connections, his art collection was a target for Nazi officials that were in charge of gathering art for Hitler's museum in Linz. Even after the war, about 70 paintings that were in his gallery are still to be found.

== Monuments Men ==
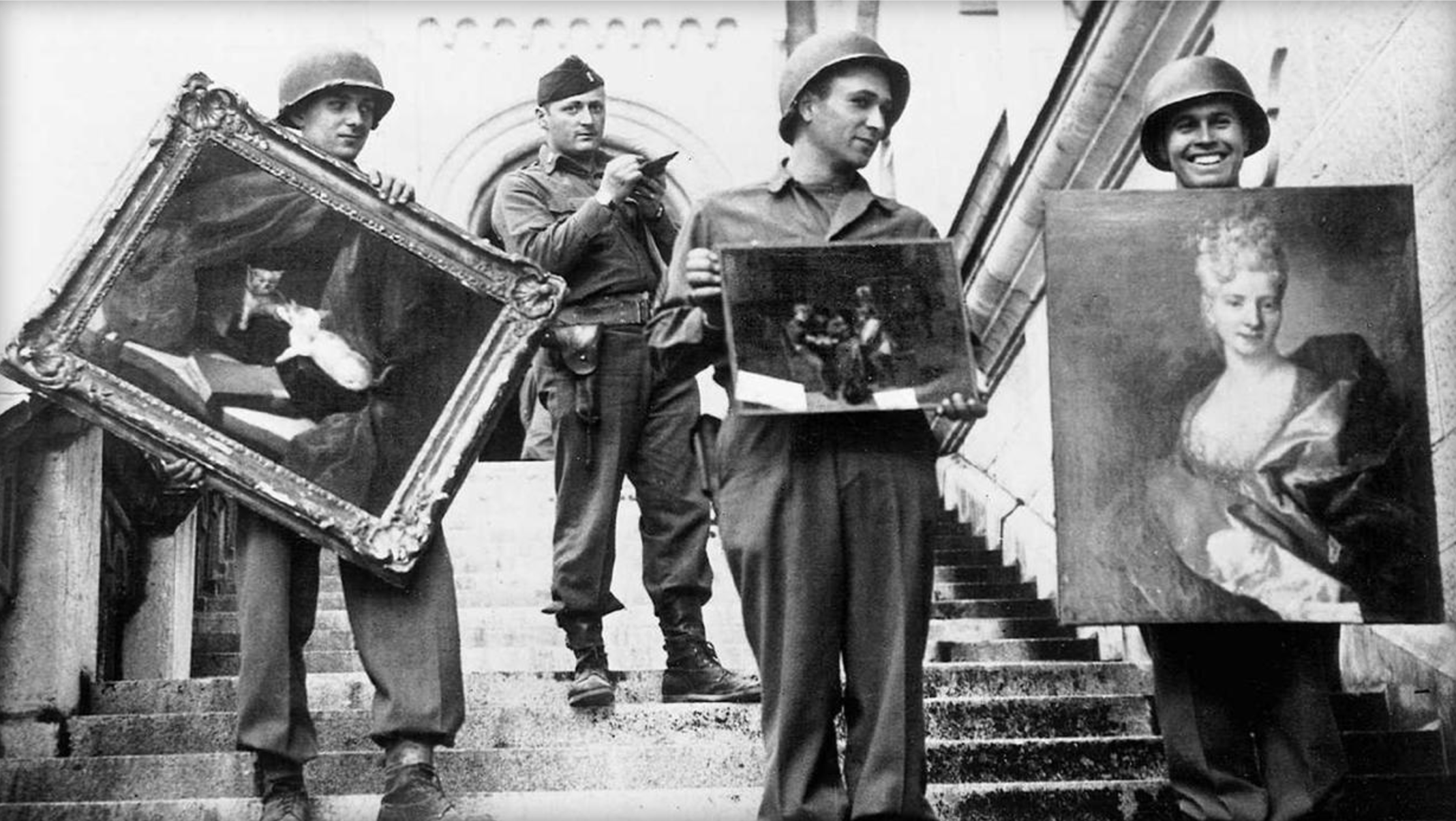
Monuments Men rescue paintings from Neuschwanstein Castle

The Monuments Men were a special task force from several different countries who were tasked to retrieve many of the stolen works of art that the Nazis had stolen before and during the course of World War II. These men were often art dealers or had museum experience. These men recovered hundreds of paintings from German castles and salt mines where the Third Reich often stored the paintings. Some of the men recall that the Altaussee Salt Mine was especially full of paintings that Hitler had intended for the Fuhrermuesum in Linz. Using what resources they could, the men and women working for this organization packaged and tried best to preserve the art pieces. These men were also responsible for rescuing paintings that the Reich was willing to destroy rather than to have the Allies recover. On March 19, 1945, Hitler ordered a scorch earth order that also included any resources that "might be used by the enemy in the continuation of his fight, either now or later, are to be destroyed." This applied to the Altaussee Salt Mine and the paintings that were stored within. Fortunately, the Monuments Men were able to reach the mine in time and prevent the destruction of the works stored there.

Not everyone in Germany viewed the Monuments Men as heroes. Many Germans saw the Monuments Men as looters who were taking away the art and not only confiscating it (like the ERR had done) but removing it from Europe permanently. While there was some looting done by the Allied troops, the Monuments Men were dedicated to preserving and safeguarding the art pieces that were part of German and European culture. Around 200 pieces of art did end up in the United States, but many were returned after protests. The Monuments Men helped to set precedents for the standards of protection that cultural art pieces would receive in the future and contributed to the formation of the United Nations Educational, Scientific and Cultural Organization (UNESCO) in 1945.

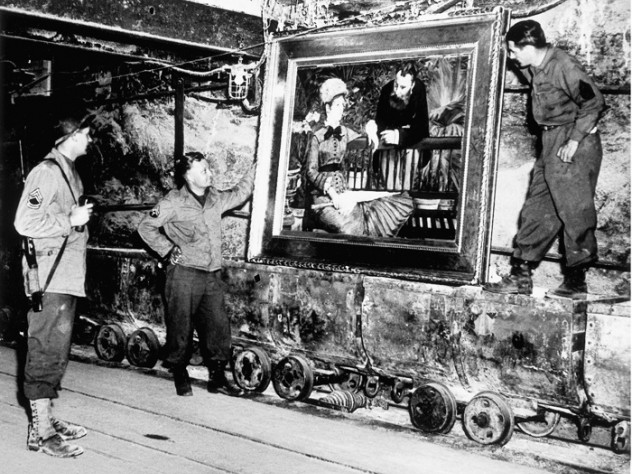
Monuments Men rescue painting from salt mine

== Hitler's art dealer ==
There were many men who were involved in the obtaining art pieces for Hitler's museum in Linz. These men were spared military service because Hitler believed they were "absolutely indispensable to the Linz project". One of the men that was involved was Hildebrand Gurlitt. Gurlitt was an art dealer and trader and also worked personally for the Fuhrer in gaining many important art pieces. Gurlitt and just a few other men were excused from military service due to their contributions to the museum effort. While working for the Reich, Gurlitt also managed to save many "degenerate" art pieces and build up a large personal collection. During the war, Gurlitt hid many paintings in many places in order to keep them safe from both bombing and those that would confiscate the art. When the Monuments Men began to recover stolen art, Gurlitt was afraid that the organization would find his personal collection as well as his hidden trove of artwork. When the Monuments Men did come to investigate his collection, Gurlitt carefully exhibited only a few paintings of valuable and questionable worth and was successful at concealing his larger trove. The Monuments Men ended up confiscating around 7% of Gurlitt's collection (about 100 paintings) but did not find the other 93% of the collection. It is estimated that Gurlitt's hidden collection was worth twelve million reichsmarks while the art taken by the Monuments Men was considerably less valued. Hildebrand Gurlitt was successful at preserving a large collection of art and prevented it from falling into the Allies' hands. This collection would be discovered in his son's Cornelius Gurlitt's apartment several decades later in 2013. The collection found in Cornelius's apartment was enormous and contained over 1000 paintings and other works of art. Among this trove they found some of Paul Rosenberg's lost paintings which had been taken over 70 years prior.

== Hitler's collection ==
The Astronomer was part of Hitler's collection for a short time It was originally part of the Rothschilds family collection but was taken from them in 1940 by the ERR (Einsatzstab Reichsleiter Rosenberg). This painting was then stamped with the swastika on the back and put in a crate designated for the Fuehrer. The Astronomer was one painting that Hitler really wanted for his collection. When it was obtained by a Nazi official he said in triumph that he believed that the news would bring the Fuhrer great joy. The Madonna of Bruges was a statue created by Michelangelo. It was intended for the Fuhrermuseum but never made it there due to the war. The Grand Canal in Venice painting was also intended for the Fuhrermuseum but never made it because the construction on the museum stopped due to the war.
