= Nina Zimmer =

German art historian (born 1973)

Nina Zimmer (born 1973) is a German art historian who is director of the Zentrum Paul Klee and the Museum of Fine Arts Bern.

== Early life ==
Zimmer was born in 1973. She studied art history, Romance languages and media studies in Bordeaux, Göttingen, Münster and Hamburg.

In 2001 she was at the University of Göttingen with a thesis on art collectives around 1960 PhD. From April 2001 to August 2002 Zimmer was a scholarship holder of the state of Lower Saxony at the Central Institute for Art History in Munich. She then volunteered room at the Kunsthalle Hamburg.

== Career ==
From 2006, Zimmer was curator for nineteenth-century art and classical modernism at the Kunstmuseum Basel and vice-director for two years. In August 2016 she took over the management of the Kunstmuseum Bern, and at the same time she became the director of the Zentrum Paul Klee in a dual function.

Prior to her museum career in 2002 she was a guest lecturer at the Department of Art History University of Chicago and in 2004 Visiting Professor of Western art theory at Korea National University of Arts in Seoul, South Korea. Her field of research is the art of the 19th and 20th centuries.

== Selected publications ==
- Jean Dubuffet in der Sahara, Ausst.-Kat. Hamburger Kunsthalle 2005
- Soutine und die Moderne, Ausst.-Kat. Kunstmuseum Basel 2008
- Andreas Gursky, Ausst.-Kat. Kunstmuseum Basel 2007
- Vincent van Gogh, Die Landschaften, Kunstmuseum Basel 2009
- Vincent van Gogh, The Landscapes, Kunstmuseum Basel 2009
- Vincent van Gogh, Les Paysages, Kunstmuseum Basel 2009
- Andy Warhol, The Early Years, Kunstmuseum Basel 2010
- Kunstmuseum Basel Die Meisterwerke, Basel 2011
- Kunstmuseum Basel The Masterpieces, Basel 2011
- Kunstmuseum Basel Les chefs-d’oeuvre, Basel 2011
