= Cornelius Gurlitt (art collector) =

German art collector (1932–2014)

- Born: 28 December 1932; Hamburg, Germany
- Died: 6 May 2014 (aged 81); Munich, Germany
- Occupation: Art collector
- Parents: Hildebrand Gurlitt; Helene Hanke
- Relatives: Cornelius Gurlitt (grandfather)

Rolf Nikolaus Cornelius Gurlitt (28 December 1932 – 6 May 2014) was a German art collection owner. The son of Hildebrand Gurlitt, an art gallery director and Nazi-era dealer of looted art who worked for Adolf Hitler and Hermann Göring, Gurlitt inherited from his father a collection of over 1,400 artworks known as the Gurlitt trove or Gurlitt Collection, 14 of which were subsequently demonstrated to have been looted from Jews by the Nazis. Upon its public discovery, the collection was impounded by the Augsburg Prosecutor's Office as evidence in a possible case for tax evasion that was never mounted; the works were not returned to Gurlitt's estate until after his death. In his will, Gurlitt left the entire collection, minus any works that turned out to be looted, to the Museum of Fine Arts Bern (German: Kunstmuseum Bern), apparently in reaction over his perceived poor treatment by the German authorities.

== Early life ==
Gurlitt's parents were the art dealer and previous museum director Hildebrand Gurlitt, who worked for the Nazis selling looted art, and his wife, Helene Hanke. He grew up in the Dammtor district of Hamburg with his sister Renate (later known as Benita), who was born there in 1935.

After attending primary school in Hamburg, he went to secondary school in Dresden until the city was destroyed by allied bombing in 1945, when Gurlitt was 13. The family moved to rural Aschbach, then in 1946 Gurlitt and his sister were sent to the private Odenwaldschule at Heppenheim for a short period until he joined his family again, now settled in Düsseldorf, where he took his school leaving examination in 1953 at the age of 20.

== Death of Gurlitt's father and aftermath ==
Three years later, while Gurlitt was enrolled at Cologne University studying art history, his father Hildebrand was killed in a 1956 road accident, leaving to his wife Helene the custodianship of his extensive and valuable, but generally little known, private art collection. In 1961, Helene bought two small apartments in the Schwabing suburb of Munich, while Gurlitt moved to Austria, building himself a small house in Aigen, a relatively affluent suburb of Salzburg.

His mother died in January 1968, after which time Gurlitt divided his time between one of the two fifth-floor Munich apartments (which his sister had inherited) and his Salzburg house; he never married and lived alone for the next four decades, surrounded by the art collection he had inherited upon his mother's death. He lived modestly, drove an inexpensive Volkswagen car, and was a virtual recluse, maintaining as little contact with the outside world as possible, with the exception of regular visits from his sister Benita.

In addition to possessing a German passport, he had taken out Austrian citizenship and was registered in that country for tax purposes. However, by the 2000s, his Salzburg house was becoming neglected and Gurlitt, whose health was failing, visited it less frequently, spending more of his time residing in the Munich apartment.

Since he had never had any other source of income, after exhaustion of any other money inherited from his mother, Gurlitt appears to have lived by selling the occasional painting from his father's collection, the proceeds being paid into an account in Zurich, Switzerland, to which Gurlitt would travel every four to six weeks and withdraw €9,000 to pay his living costs. The existence, quality and extent of the collection that he had inherited remained largely secret, unknown to his acquaintances and the public at large, although according to one dealer was "common knowledge among dealers in southern Germany".

== Discovery of collection ==
In September 2010, Gurlitt, then aged 77, was stopped on a train returning from Zurich to Munich and found to have €9,000 in his possession, which he said came from selling some paintings he had had in his possession in 1978. He made regular trips to the Swiss art dealer Eberhard Kornfeld who paid him in cash or by cheque. The amount was below the legally allowed limit to be carried between countries in cash but aroused the suspicion of authorities that he might be involved in some sort of art fraud selling stolen artworks on the black market, on which he was paying no tax in Germany. "Cornelius Gurlitt was not registered with Munich municipal authorities and had no tax number or pension - enough to start a probe" Reuters reported.

German customs officials obtained a warrant to search his sister's Munich apartment where he was living and discovered 1,406 works of art initially reported as worth €1 billion (this figure was subsequently revised downwards to some tens of millions of euros). The collection included works by Renoir, Matisse, Otto Dix and many other famous artists. These works were all confiscated by officials of the Augsburg Prosecutor's office, although the legality of that action was later challenged in court.

Gurlitt had no lawyer at the time, and his repeated requests for the collection to be returned to him on the basis that he had committed no crime went unheeded. The Augsburg Prosecutor's investigation, meanwhile, proceeded very slowly and out of public sight until the find was leaked to the press and sensationally reported by the German magazine Focus on 3 November 2013. News of the discovery was reported worldwide.

In December 2013, a local court in Munich appointed a German lawyer, Christoph Edel, to look after Gurlitt's affairs for the next six months, under a scheme which provides legal representation for old or infirm clients. Edel filed lawsuits first against unidentified officials who had leaked information on the discovery to the press, then on the Prosecutor's office for return of the collection, which, however, Gurlitt was never to see again. Gurlitt also revealed to Edel the existence of a second portion of the collection at his Salzburg house, which Edel took steps to secure and remove to a new location on Gurlitt's behalf; these items, more than 250 pieces including works by Monet, Renoir, Gauguin, Liebermann, de Toulouse-Lautrec, Courbet, Cézanne, Munch, and Manet, were never touched by the German authorities.

== Investigation into Nazi-looted art ==
Initially, Gurlitt reportedly maintained that all of the works in his collection had been acquired legally by his father; however subsequent research proved that this was not true. Artworks from the collections of Fritz Salo Glaser, Armand Dorville, Henri Hinrichsen, Georges Mandel and David Friedmann were among the many previously owned by Jewish collectors found in Gurlitt's possession. In 2014 he stated he would restitute to victims' families works found to be looted as recommended by the 1998 Washington Principles on Nazi-Confiscated Art.

In 2011 when he put Max Beckmann's The Lion Tamer up for sale at the Cologne auction house Lempertz, it was recognized by Mike Hulton, heir to the Jewish dealer Alfred Flechtheim, who had been persecuted and plundered in the Nazi era. Hulton requested its return, and a settlement was reached to share the profits of the sale, the picture eventually selling for €864,000.

== Death and gift to Swiss museum ==
Following a number of years of ill health, Gurlitt died of heart failure on 6 May 2014 at the age of 81. The will he wrote shortly before his death unexpectedly named a museum in Switzerland, the Museum of Fine Arts Bern (German: Kunstmuseum Bern), as his "sole heir". People close to Gurlitt told an American newspaper that he decided to give the collection to a foreign institution because he felt that Germany had treated him and his father badly. The legacy included the items that Gurlitt had kept in Munich and also in Salzburg, which German authorities had not confiscated because their remit did not extend to property held in Austria, plus his properties in the two locations, which the Bern Museum subsequently announced they would be selling in order to offset some of the costs associated with accepting the bequest.

The will stipulated that the museum would be required to research the provenance of the paintings and make restitution as appropriate. The museum decided to accept those works, none of which are suggested to represent the proceeds of Nazi-era looting, and enter into a joint agreement with German and Swiss authorities about the handling of this bequest. The will was challenged by one of Gurlitt's cousins based on a psychiatric report concluding that Gurlitt suffered from dementia, schizoid personality disorder, and a delusional disorder at the time he wrote his will. The challenge was defeated in court and the Bern bequest permitted to stand.

== Ongoing research and restitutions ==
Among the Nazi-looted artworks in Gurlitt's collection were a portrait by Matisse restituted to the heirs of French art dealer Paul Rosenberg;Two Riders on a Beach (1901), by Max Liebermann, which was returned to the heirs of the German-Jewish industrialist and art collector David Friedmann and sold at auction in June 2015; and Carl Spitzweg's Musical Pair, looted from Henri Hinrichsen, who was murdered in the Holocaust. A Chagall looted from Savely Blumstein was also discovered in the Gurlitt stash.

Additional items have continued to be identified as looted and have been returned to the original owners' heirs where known. Some of the works from the collection went on exhibition in November 2017.

== See also ==
- Art collection of Adolf Hitler
- Hildebrand Gurlitt
- Gurlitt Collection
- Nazi plunder
- List of claims for restitution for Nazi-looted art

== Bibliography ==
- Hickley, Catherine. "The Munich Art Hoard: Hitler's Dealer and his Secret Legacy." Thames & Hudson, London, 2015, 272 pp. ISBN 9780500292570
- Collins, Jacob R. "The Gurlitt Trove: Its Past, Present and Future." Undergraduate Thesis, University of Vermont, 2016, 54 pp. Available online at
