= Julian Radcliffe =

British businessman

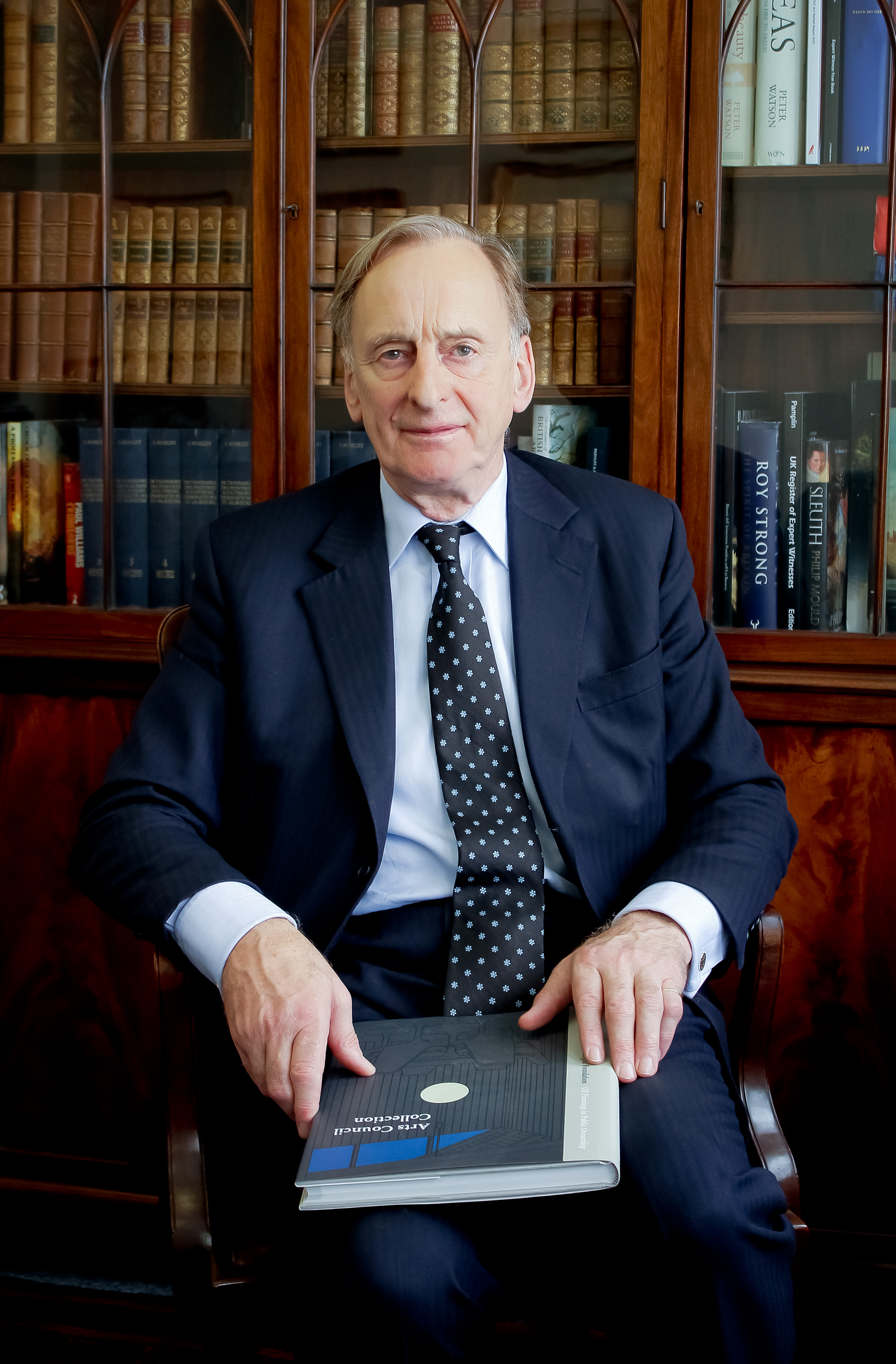
- Born: August 1948 (age 77)
- Education: Eton
- Alma mater: New College, Oxford
- Occupation: Businessman
- Known for: Founder, chairman and majority shareholder, Art Loss Register

Julian Guy Yonge Radcliffe OBE QVRM (born August 1948) is a British businessman, and the founder and chairman of the Art Loss Register (ALR).

== Early life ==
He was educated at Eton, and New College, Oxford, and graduated with a degree in politics and economics.

== Career ==
In 1970, Radcliffe joined Hogg Robinson, as a Lloyd's of London insurance broker. He claims that in 1975, he was one of the co-founders of Control Risks, then a Hogg Robinson subsidiary, with Timothy Royle. However, he does not appear in any company literature regarding the founding process and was likely just an early minority shareholder. In 1990, he founded the Art Loss Register. ("ALR")

Radcliffe is the majority shareholder in the Art Loss Register, with auction houses Sotheby's (a/k/a Oatshare Ltd.) owning about 11%, Christie's about 3%. In 1991, The International Foundation for Art Research, based in New York City, NY (USA) helped create the Art Loss Register (ALR) as a commercial enterprise to expand and market the database. IFAR managed ALR's U.S. operations through 1997. In 1998 the ALR assumed full responsibility for the IFAR database although IFAR retains ownership

While widely recognised for its contributions to art recovery, the ALR has faced occasional scrutiny over its negotiations with the holders of lost art. However, Shortland’s detailed analysis emphasises that these negotiations are legal, ethical, and necessary to ensure rightful restitution while preventing criminals from profiting.

As of 2016, the Art Loss Register claims to be the world's largest private database of lost and stolen art, with more than 300,000 items.

== Honours ==
Radcliffe was awarded an OBE in 1999 and the QVRM in 2004 for activities unrelated to his work at the Art Loss Register.

== Personal life ==
Radcliffe lives near Much Wenlock, Shropshire.

Radcliffe's favourite painting is A Cornfield, 1815, by Peter De Wint, in the collection of the V&A, London.
