= Museum of Fine Arts Bern =

Art museum in Switzerland

Coordinates: 46.9511°N 7.4434°E

Kunstmuseum Bern
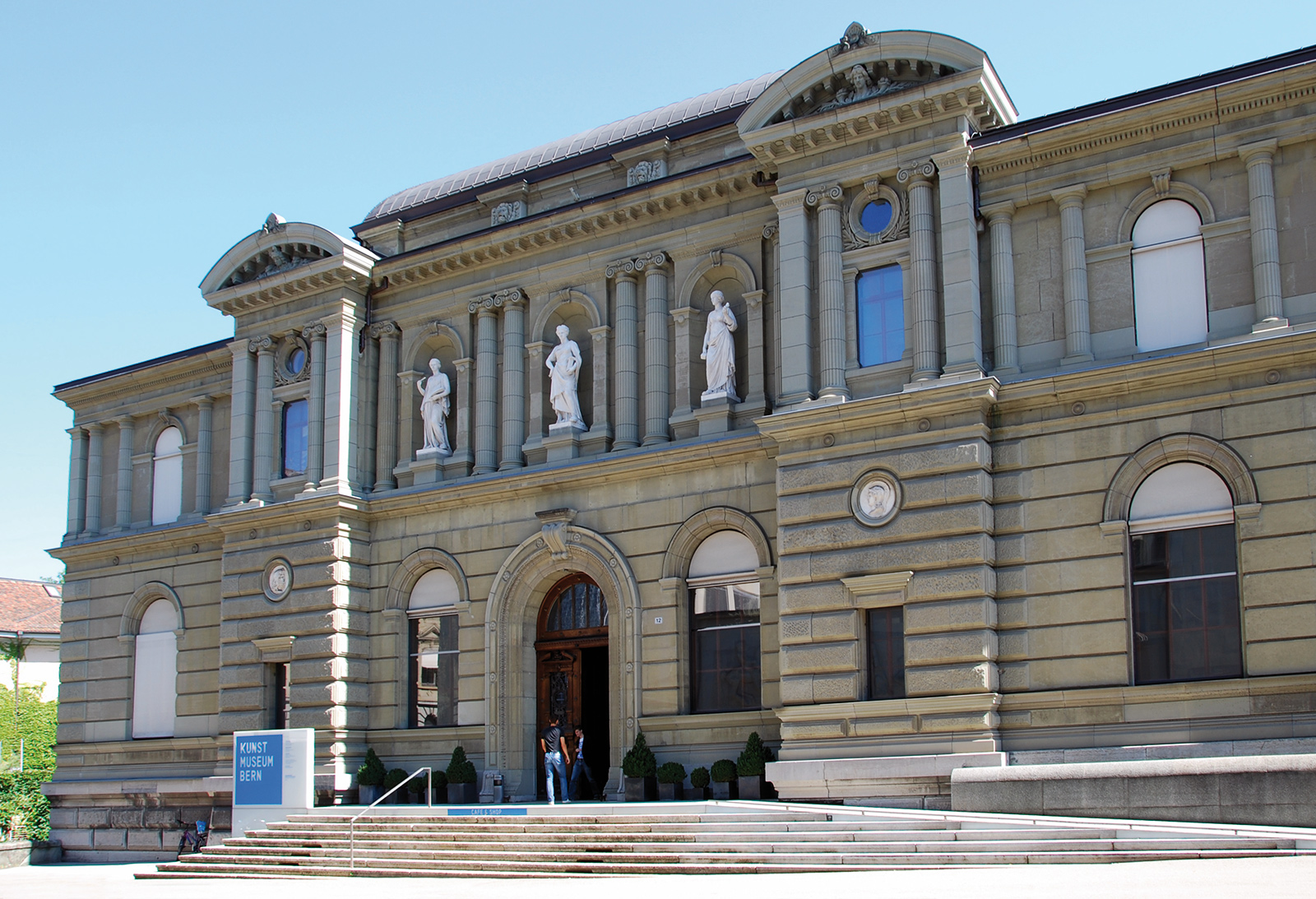
- Established: 1879
- Location: 8–12 Hodler Street; Bern, Switzerland
- Type: Art museum
- Director: Nina Zimmer
- Website: www.kunstmuseumbern.ch

The Museum of Fine Arts Bern (German: Kunstmuseum Bern), established in 1879 in Bern, is the museum of fine arts of the de facto capital of Switzerland.

== Collections ==
Its holdings run from the Middle Ages to the present. It houses works by Paul Klee, Pablo Picasso, Edmond Jean de Pury, Ferdinand Hodler, Méret Oppenheim, Ricco Wassmer and Adolf Wölfli. The collection consists of over 3,000 paintings and sculptures as well as 48,000 drawings, prints, photographs, videos and films.

=== Gurlitt collections ===
In May 2014, the museum was named sole heir in the will of Cornelius Gurlitt, the German collector associated with the 2012 Munich artworks discovery. The authorities had found over 1,400 artworks, many of them suspected to be stolen from European Jews by the Nazis, in Gurlitt's homes in Munich and Salzburg. The museum was given six months to decide whether it would accept the bequest and its terms. The most important provision required that the museum conduct research into the provenance of the paintings and make restitution where needed to the heirs of the original owners. The museum director, Matthias Frehner, pledged that it would do so if it accepted the bequest. The German government quietly urged the museum to accept the collection in order to provide a neutral place where research into its history could continue. (There was concern that if the collection were dispersed among Gurlitt's distant relatives, there would be no guarantee that they would conduct the research properly.) Determining whether or not to accept required much deliberation on the part of the museum board, work by its legal team, and significant fundraising from Swiss donors, so that the museum would not be reliant on German funding that could taint the neutrality of the provenance research. In November 2014 the board voted to accept the collection.

In August 2018, an episode of Fake or Fortune featured the director of the museum, Nina Zimmer, asking the team to investigate what appears to be the sole British piece of art in the Gurlitt collection.

=== Kornfeld collection ===
In 2024, Eberhard W. Kornfeld bequeathed five paintings to the museum, including Ernst Ludwig Kirchner's Junkerboden (1919) and Alberto Giacometti's Caroline (1965).

== See also ==
- List of museums in Switzerland
