= Art Loss Register =

World's largest database of stolen art

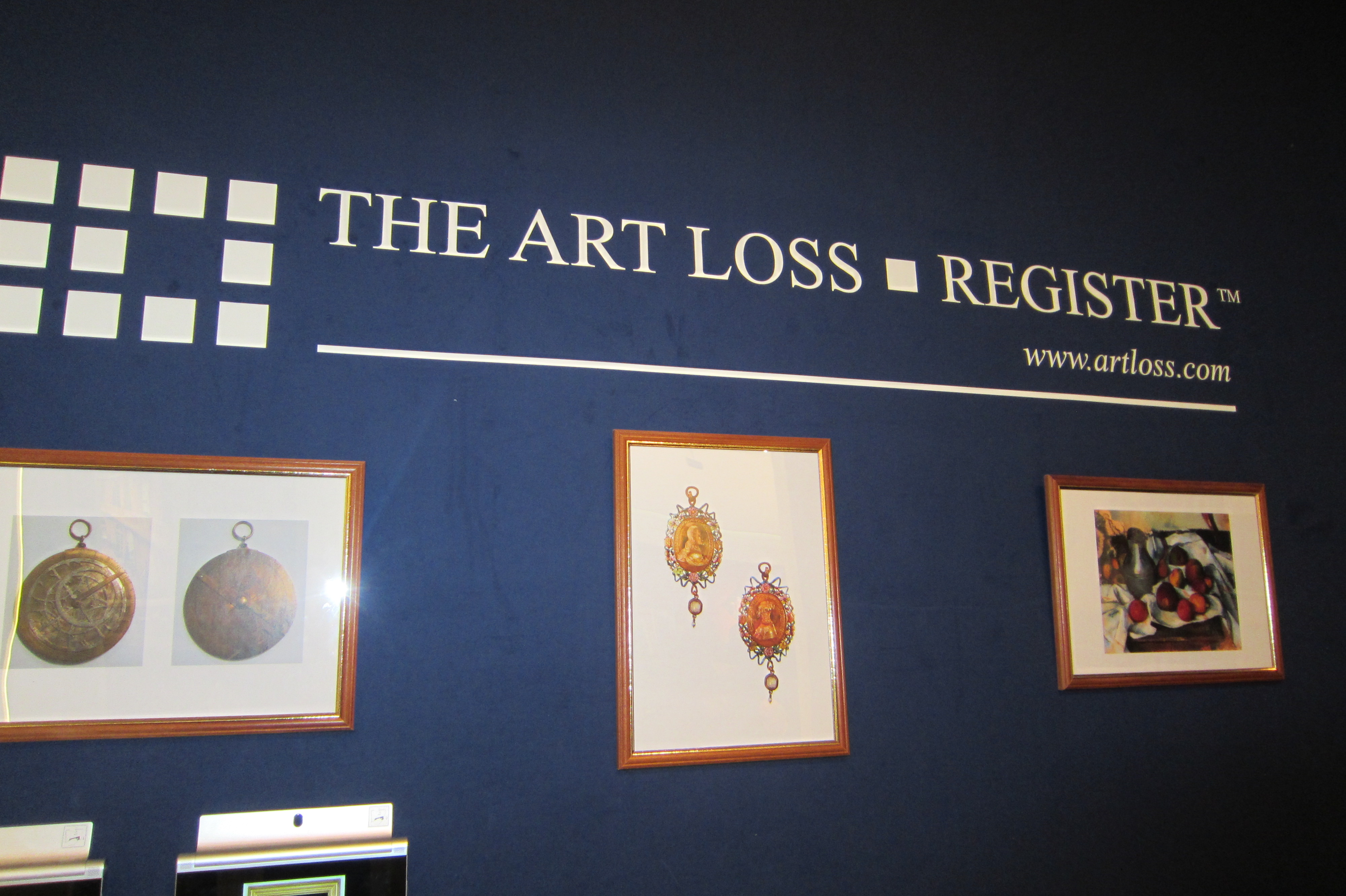
Art Loss Register at TEFAF Maastricht 2015

The Art Loss Register (ALR) is the world's largest database of stolen art. A computerized international database that captures information about lost and stolen art, antiques, and collectibles, the ALR is a London-based, independent, for-profit corporate offspring of the New York–based, nonprofit International Foundation for Art Research (IFAR). The range of functions served by ALR has grown as the number of its listed items has increased. The database is used by collectors, the art trade, insurers, and law enforcement agencies worldwide. In 1991, IFAR helped create the ALR as a commercial enterprise to expand and market the database. IFAR managed ALR's U.S. operations through 1997. In 1998, the ALR assumed full responsibility for the IFAR database, although IFAR retains ownership. In 1992, the database comprised only 20,000 items, but it grew in size nearly tenfold during its first decade.

== History ==
The first steps toward the ALR began with the establishment of IFAR in New York in 1969.

Among other explicit goals, IFAR was created to compile information about stolen art. In response to the growth of international art thefts, IFAR began publishing the "Stolen Art Alert" in 1976.

By 1990, IFAR was updating its catalogue of stolen art ten times a year. The magnitude of the problem overwhelmed what had grown to be over 20,000 manual records. While IFAR had successfully recorded the details of losses, that was only a good first step.

In 1991, the ALR was established in London as a commercial company, earning fees from insurers and theft victims. Its founding shareholders included insurance and auction houses, which some think is a conflict of interest (Christie's). The majority of shares are owned by its founder, Julian Radcliffe. Significant capital investment was needed so that IFAR could be computerized and so that the database made available to worldwide law enforcement agencies.

== Development ==
In response to the growth and development of IFAR, museum officials revised some policies based on the assumption that discussing theft would scare away potential donors. The AFR initially formed a partnership with the ALR, but they split after disagreements over strategy and control issues. The change from policies of secrecy to ones that emphasize openness was gradual, mirroring an expectation that publicizing theft is likely to promote recovery.

The ALR has been widely criticised for its methods and the actions of its chairman, Radcliffe. The ALR has consistently lost money but for the personal cash infusions of its chairman.

Selected timeline

- 1990: Artworks stolen from the Isabella Stewart Gardner Museum in Boston includes Vermeer's Concert, three Rembrandts and five works by Degas.
- 1989: IFAR received reports of about 5,000 thefts.
- 2003: The ALR obtains information about a Sisley stolen from the Musée des Beaux-Arts d'Orléans in Orléans, France. The museum could not afford the fee, and the Sisley was not recovered.

== Criticism of methods ==
The approach adopted by the ALR has been criticised. The ALR has contacted owners of stolen art, saying it had information but not revealing it until a fee was paid. In another instance, the ALR lied to Sotheby's, saying that paintings were not stolen. The paintings were then shipped to London, where they were seized. The ALR has likened this approach to the police misleading a suspect during an investigation.

== See also ==
- Art theft
- Koordinierungsstelle für Kulturgutverluste
