= David Friedmann =

German Jewish businessman and art collector (1857-1942)

- Born: 24 January 1857; Rawitsch
- Died: 15 February 1942 (aged 85); Breslau
- Occupations: Entrepreneur and art collector

David Friedmann (24 January 1857 in Rawitsch - 15 February 1942 in Breslau) was a German entrepreneur and art collector.

== Life and work ==
Friedmann was Jewish, the son of the Silesian merchant Louis Friedmann (around 1830-1894) and his wife Seraphine, née Wachtel (died on 16 May 1890). He had a younger brother, Siegmund Friedmann (1859-1931). David Friedmann became a successful entrepreneur. In 1882 he married Laura, née Friedmann, daughter of Gustav Friedmann (1835-1899), owner of the manor and royal councillor of commerce, and his wife Charlotte, née Lissen (1835-1876). The couple had a daughter, Charlotte, born on 11 April 1883 in Breslau.

Together with his brother, David Friedmann initially established himself as a brick manufacturer. After the death of his father-in-law, he took over his business and the manor. From 1903 to 1921, the family lived in Berlin, where Friedmann traded in real estate. The Friedmanns spent their summers in their New Castle in Großburg, now Borek Strzeliński, and later their winters in an elegant villa in Breslau's Ahornallee.

== Art collection ==
Friedmann was a passionate collector. He acquired an extensive collection of mainly French, Dutch and German painters of Realism and Impressionism, including works by Gustave Courbet, Camille Pissarro and Jean-François Raffaëlli, by Jozef Israëls as well as by Lovis Corinth, Walter Leistikow and Max Liebermann. He was the first owner of Liebermann's painting Two Riders on the Beach facing left from 1901.

== Nazi persecution ==
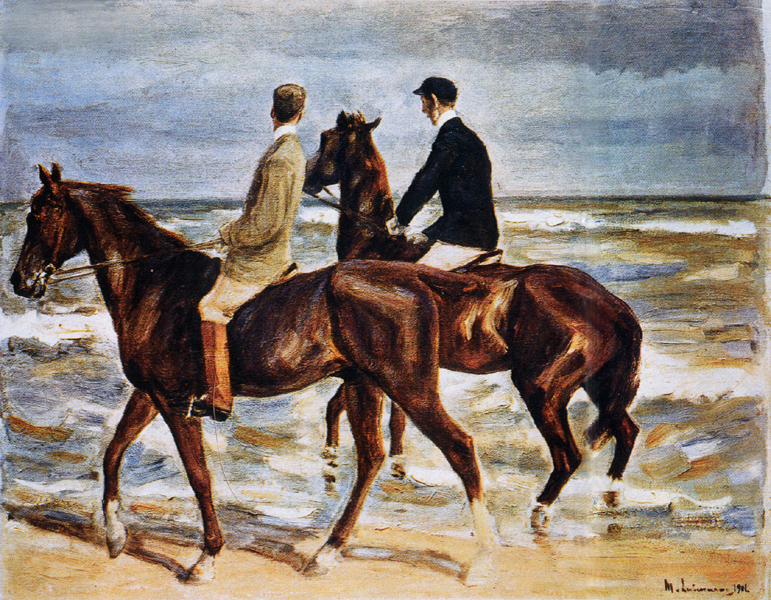
Zwei Reiter am Strand aus dem Schwabinger Kunstfund (Sammlung David Friedmann, Breslau)

After the Nazis came to power in Germany in January 1933, Friedmann was persecuted because of his Jewish heritage. In 1937, he was forced to sell his summer residence in Großburg, and in November 1938 the Haltauf manor, including the hunting grounds he had inherited from his father-in-law. In 1938, his art collection, which the Nazi regime had its eye on, was appraised for the first time, followed by a second appraisal on 24 January 1940. In 1941, he was expelled from his house and farm, his possessions and property were "aryanized", including his works of art. He found modest accommodation in Akazienallee and died in February 1942.

His daughter Charlotte was deported to Ravensbrück concentration camp, then transferred to Auschwitz and murdered there on 9 October 1942. His sister-in-law Bettina was murdered in Theresienstadt on 19 October 1942, and his niece Marie Hildegard Tarnowski was murdered there in March 1943. The niece's husband, Georg Martin Tarnowski, was murdered in Auschwitz in March 1943. Their sons, Herman Peter Tarnesby (1921-2014) and David Toren (1925-2020), were brought to safety in time. They survived.

As the daughter remained childless and was murdered, the great-nephews became sole heirs after David Friedmann's death.

== Restitution ==
The entire Friedmann collection was stolen by the Nazi regime, 306 objects, arranged according to the rooms in the Breslau villa at Ahornallee 27.

On 5 March 2024 the grand-nephew of David Friedman, David Toren filed a claim for restitution in an American court against Germany and Bavaria demanding the restitution of Max Lieberman's Two Riders on the Beach. The painting, looted by the Nazis, surfaced in 2012 as part of the stash of paintings found in the possession of the son of one of Hitler's art dealers, Hildebrand Gurlitt.

The heirs were the collector's great-nephews, who had both become acquainted with the collection as children and teenagers and had spent a lot of time with their great-uncle. The restitution only took place after the older heir, Herman Peter Tarnesby (1921-2014), had died and the younger heir, David Toren (born 1925), had gone completely blind. As Tarnesby had three daughters, there were now four heirs. They then put the painting up for auction at Sotheby's in London. An unknown bidder bought it by telephone for 1.9 million pounds. The artist Christian Thee made a relief of Liebermann's painting in 2014 and gave it to David Toren so that he could feel it.

Another work by Liebermann, the pastel The Basket Weavers, no. 252 on the inventory list of Friedmann's confiscated collection, also ended up with the art dealer Hildebrand Gurlitt. This painting was handed over by Benita Fräßle-Gurlitt (1935-2012), Cornelius Gurlitt's sister, to the Villa Grisebach auction house for auction in 2000. The print fetched 130,000 DM and went to a Holocaust survivor living in Israel. An agreement was reached. David Toren received the painting and the buyer was refunded the purchase price.

The other 304 objects looted by the Nazis have not yet been restituted.

== Sources ==
- Aufnahme und Schätzung aller Kunstgegenstände, Antiquitäten, Gemälde, echter Teppiche etc. im Hause Ahornallee 27 zu Breslau 18. Besitzer: David Israel Friedmann wohnhaft daselbst. Zum Zeitwert. I/16886, Archiwum Państwowe we Wrocławiu, Wrocław, Polen
- Letter from Cornelius Müller Hofstede to Hildebrand Gurlitt, 28. August 1942, MNWr., GD, II/206, k. 12, Gabinet Dokumentów, Muzeum Narodowe we Wrocławiu, Wrocław, Polen
- David Toren: Ich unterscheide zwischen Deutschen, die alt genug sind, um eine Rolle im Krieg gespielt zu haben, und der Nachkriegsgeneration, Interview mit Maria Eichhorn für das Rose Valland Institut, 2016–17
