= Institute for Museum Research =

German research institute

Institute for Museum Research Institut für Museumsforschung (IfM)

- Location within Germany
- Established: 1979
- Location: In der Halde 1; 14195 Berlin, Germany
- Coordinates: 52.463202°N 13.287081°E
- Type: Research Institute
- Public transit access: Dahlem-Dorf; Bus X11, X83 (Domäne Dahlem); 110 (Drosselweg)
- Website: Institut für Museumsforschung

The Institute for Museum Research (German: Institut für Museumsforschung (IfM)) is a national organization which provides services to museums in the Federal Republic of Germany in the areas of research, application-oriented teaching and documentation. The Institute was founded in 1979 as a department of the Berlin State Museums, overseen by the Prussian Cultural Heritage Foundation. The Institute also operates the Center for Provenance Research, tasked with the identification and proper return of looted art from the Nazi period.

Additionally, the Institute assists regional museums in the German States. Research projects are carried out in cooperation with experts from relevant scientific disciplines in social sciences, education, engineering and natural sciences.

== Center for Provenance Research ==
The Center for Provenance Research and Investigation (German: Arbeitsstelle für Provenienzrecherche/-forschung (AfP)) supports museums, libraries, archives and other publicly run institutions in the Federal Republic of Germany in the various processes of identifying cultural artifacts in their collections or in their possession which were looted from their lawful owners during the Nazi period. The Office was established in 2007 as the direct result of findings issued by the working group on matters of restitution set up by the Minister of State for Culture, Bernd Neumann

Provisions for the Office have been made possible through financial support from the Cultural Foundation of the German States (German: Kulturstiftung der Länder). Funds totaling a million euros are assigned each year from the Federal Government Commissioner for Culture and the Media to support the investigation and study of the provenance of cultural artifacts. An Advisory Council made up of individuals from political and cultural institutions, as well as experts from the fields of history and art history, makes a significant contribution to the outcome of the decision as to which applicants are to receive restitution.

The Office also works closely with the Koordinierungsstelle für Kulturgutverluste (www.lostart.de) in publishing its findings and searching for the lawful owners of art works. It is also the aim of the Office to further ongoing ties between those individuals and institutions active in the field of provenance research and to encourage the sharing of information and research knowledge.

In October 2014 the German Federal Government announced the reformation of the Koordinierungsstelle’s Lost Art Database into a new foundation called the Deutsches Zentrum Kulturgutverluste (English: “German Center for Lost Cultural Assets”), which will put the Lost Art Database, the Arbeitsstelle für Provenienzforschung (English: “Center for Provenance Research”) in Berlin, the Taskforce of the Munich artworks discovery, and the Research Center for Degenerate Art of the Free University of Berlin under one roof. The stated goal of this reformation is to promote the active research and restitution of Nazi-looted cultural assets. The general reception of this announcement in the press was skeptical, with the Frankfurter Allgemeine, a major German daily newspaper, commenting: "It shouldn't be about creating new positions in a new place for officials who thus far haven't been doing their job.“
