= Lost Art-Database =

Catalog of objects looted by Nazis

The Lost Art-Datenbank is an online database published by the German Lost Art Foundation (Deutsches Zentrum Kulturgutverluste. It contains information on cultural objects looted from Jewish collectors or transferred due to Nazi persecution during the Nazi era. Until 2015, it was managed by the Koordinierungsstelle für Kulturgutverluste (Magdeburg Coordination Office).

== Creation ==
Following the Washington Conference of 1998, and the commitments to provide more transparency regarding looted art, Germany launched the Lost Art Database in 2000 order to help Holocaust victims and their families track down artworks that had been looted from them or lost due to Nazi persecution.

== Functionality ==
The Lost Art Database lists art and books and other cultural objects that were lost, seized, stolen or forceably sold during the Nazi era. The database is divided into search requests from victims' families, heirs or institutions and "found" reports from cultural institutions on items with unresolved provenance gaps from the Nazi periods.

The section on reports of finds lists objects that are known to have been unlawfully seized or relocated as a result of the war. In addition, reports are published here on cultural objects for which an uncertain or incomplete provenance may indicate a possible unlawful seizure or war-related relocation.

The publication of reports in the Lost Art Internet Database is carried out on behalf of and with the consent of the reporting persons and institutions. The responsibility for the content of the reports lies with these legal or natural persons. There have been controversies over which items should be included in the database.

Lost Art is based on the Washington Principles adopted in 1998, which Germany has committed itself to implementing (Joint Declaration, 1999).

The Lost Art Database is considered a key resource in the search for looted art and the victims of persecution.

Every item in the Lost Art Database has an identifier, known as a Lost Art ID.

Proveana is the linked research database.

== Other lost art databases ==
Other countries have launched databases to help identify Nazi looted art. Each database has its own area of focus. The German Lost Art Database allows families or heirs to submit information.

Other countries have databases that focus on looted artworks that have not been found or artworks that were repatriated to the national authorities after the defeat of the Nazis but were never returned to their original owners.

Other databases have been created for stolen antiquities, looted art from colonial era, art stolen from Syria, Iraq, Ukraine, or from museums or collectors.

== See also ==
- List of claims for restitution for Nazi-looted art
- The Holocaust
- Provenance Research
