= Gurlitt Collection =

Art collection

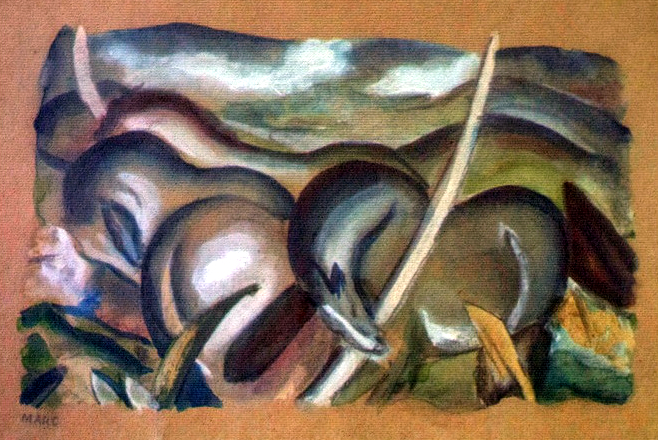
Franz Marc's Pferde in Landschaft (Horses in Landscape), one of the artworks discovered in the Gurlitt collection (probably 1911, watercolour)

The Gurlitt Collection (alternatively known as the "Gurlitt Trove", "Gurlitt Hoard", "Munich Art Hoard", "Schwabing Art Trove", "Schwabing Art Find", etc.) was a collection of around 1,500 art works inherited by Cornelius Gurlitt, the son of one of Hitler's official art dealers, Hildebrand Gurlitt (1895–1956), and which was found to have contained several artworks looted from Jews by the Nazis.

== Description ==
The collection attracted international interest in 2013 when it was announced as a sensational 2012 "Nazi loot discovery" by the media as a result of actions by officials of Augsburg in Cornelius Gurlitt's apartment in Schwabing, Munich, investigating Gurlitt on suspicion (later shown to be unfounded) of possible tax evasion. German authorities seized the entire collection, although Gurlitt was not detained. Gurlitt repeatedly requested the return of the collection on the grounds that he had committed no crime, but eventually agreed that the collection could remain with the Prosecutor's office for evaluation in case any Nazi-era looted works could be identified. In 2014, a new agreement was reached that the collection would be returned to Gurlitt, but he died shortly thereafter, leaving all his property – including two Munich apartments plus a house and additional works stored at his residence in Salzburg, Austria – to the Museum of Fine Arts Bern in Switzerland, which agreed to accept the collection (minus any works suspected of being looted) in November 2014. Hildebrand Gurlitt, who had assembled the collection, was suspected of incorporating a number of looted items and, potentially, works acquired in dubious circumstances during the Second World War and preceding period in Nazi Germany, in addition to works acquired legitimately and/or passed down through his family; the provenance of a significant subset of items is still under investigation.

The collection contains Old Masters as well as Impressionist, Cubist, and Expressionist paintings, drawings and prints by artists including Claude Monet, Pierre-Auguste Renoir, Paul Cézanne, Paul Gauguin, Henri Matisse, Eugène Delacroix, Edgar Degas, Henri de Toulouse-Lautrec, Franz Marc, Marc Chagall, Édouard Manet, Camille Pissarro, Auguste Rodin, Otto Dix, Edvard Munch, Gustave Courbet, Max Liebermann, Wassily Kandinsky, and Paul Klee, among many others, as well as works by family members who were themselves artists. A considerable portion of the collection is in the form of prints and other "dealer stock" in addition to a smaller, but still noteworthy number of unique and more valuable works; initial sensationalist claims of the value of the collection being "in excess of 1 billion dollars" based on its size alone have proved to be unfounded, though the collection is certainly worth tens of millions of dollars. Legally, Cornelius was the owner of all the works upon their discovery because, in Germany, legal claims on potential looted works expire after 30 years; however, from 2012 he agreed to voluntarily return any works that were shown to be looted to the heirs of the families concerned, a provision that has been carried on by the new custodians of the collection. By May 2020, 14 works had been returned, with a further 7 stated in 2021 as to be returned shortly including works by Henri Matisse, Max Liebermann, Carl Spitzweg, Camille Pissarro, Adolph von Menzel and Paul Signac, while a profit-sharing agreement was reached with the heir of another family for a work by Max Beckmann prior to its sale in 2011.

== Role of Hildebrand Gurlitt, Cornelius' father ==
Hildebrand Gurlitt was an art historian, museum director and art dealer in Germany during the 1930s who became an official art dealer for the Nazis. He was particularly interested in modern art of the day, befriended a number of artists and purchased their works for the museums under his control; when he became a dealer he often exhibited their works for sale, and on occasion purchased items he particularly liked for his own collection. From the mid-1930s onwards, he also purchased and, in some cases, sold on artworks, often bought for low prices, from private individuals including Jewish owners who were under duress to pay extortionate taxes, or were otherwise liquidating assets in order to flee the country. On the one hand he claimed he was helping the owners in their predicament, since there were few dealers who were prepared to undertake such transactions, but on the other he was not averse to enriching himself in the process, as well as providing no cooperation to post-war claimants seeking to reclaim or obtain compensation for such works sold under duress.

In 1937, Nazi Germany under Hitler condemned modern art as "degenerate" (not fitting to be called art in Hitler's view) and confiscated it from museums all over Germany. A travelling Degenerate Art Exhibition was set up where some of these pieces were displayed to the public to show their so-called "degenerate" nature. The Nazis set up a system to raise cash by selling as confiscated items abroad. The Nazis authorized four dealers, Hildebrand Gurlitt, Karl Buchholz, Ferdinand Möller and Bernhard Böhmer to trade such pieces, seeking overseas buyers in return for an agent's commission. Gurlitt's name appears against many of the entries on a listing compiled by the Ministry of Propaganda and now held by the Victoria and Albert Museum that provides details of the fate of each object, including whether it was exchanged, sold or destroyed.

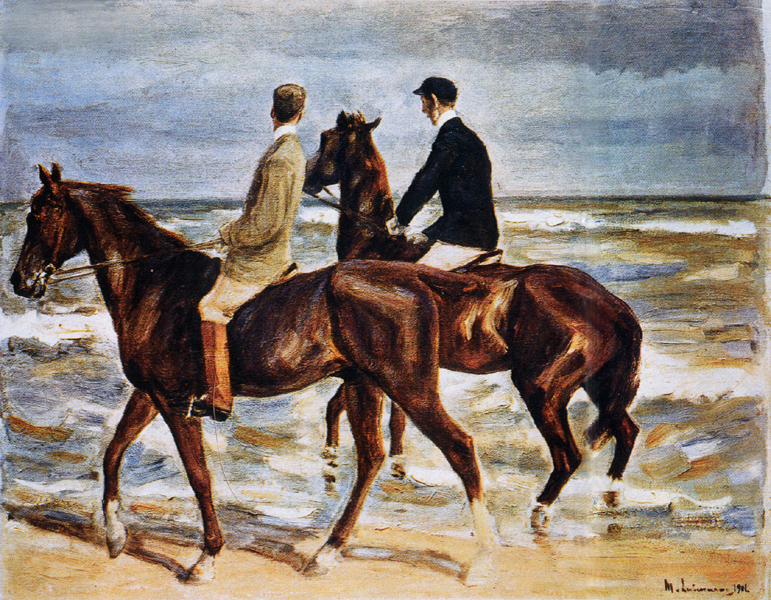
Max Liebermann's Two Riders on the Beach was held in the Gurlitt collection, but has passed to the descendants of its original Jewish owner.

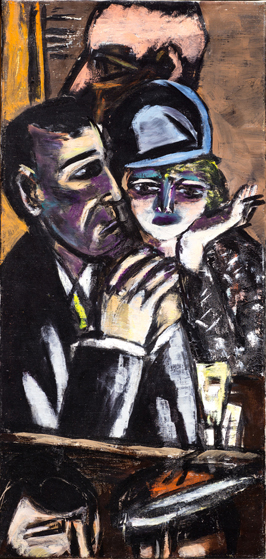
Bar, Brown, oil painting by Max Beckmann

Following the fall of France, Hermann Göring appointed a series of Reichsleiter Rosenberg Taskforce approved dealers, including Gurlitt, to acquire French art assets – mainly comprising works looted from museums and from the previously wealthy collectors of the day – for Hitler's planned Führermuseum which he wanted to build in Linz; some of the works also went to swell Göring's personal art collection. Gurlitt, who had already embarked on purchasing trips to Paris on behalf of German museums, purchased around 200 works in Paris and the Netherlands between 1943 and 1944, not including works acquired for his own collection, of which 168 were intended for the Führermuseum. Gurlitt undoubtedly used his thus "officially sanctioned" purchasing trips to Paris – which was at that time awash with artworks, including old masters of dubious provenance and including many items now recognised as being looted – to further enrich his own holdings, and also became very wealthy from commissions on the enormous amounts of money being paid by Hitler's regime for artworks at that time.

Gurlitt also purchased paintings on his own behalf from artists who were being persecuted by the Nazis, among them Max Beckmann who by 1944 was living in exile in the Netherlands, prior to departing for the United States in 1947. Gurlitt and his associate Erhard Göpel, local buyer for Hitler's planned Führermuseum, purchased five works from Beckmann in September 1944, including Bar, Brown which Gurlitt retained for himself. After Gurlitt's death the painting was offered for sale by both his widow (unsuccessfully) and subsequently by his son Cornelius, when at auction by Ketterer in Stuttgart in 1972 it realised DM 90,000 to Cornelius after auctioneer's fees (the same painting later re-sold at Sotheby's in London for £1.2 million). Beckmann's family did not dispute the distribution of the sale proceeds and considered that the original purchase by Gurlitt had been legitimate, albeit under reduced circumstances of the artist.

== Post-war ==
Hildebrand was captured with his wife and twenty boxes of art in Aschbach (Schlüsselfeld) in June 1945. Under interrogation after capture, Gurlitt and his wife told United States Army authorities that in the fire bombing of Dresden of February 1945 much of his collection and his documentation of art transactions had been destroyed at his home in Kaitzer Strasse. One hundred and fifteen pieces were taken from him by American and German authorities, but returned to him after he had convinced them that he had acquired them lawfully. Gurlitt successfully presented himself to his assessors as a victim of Nazi persecution due to his Jewish heritage, and negotiated the release of his possessions. Whether or not portions of his collection and records of business transactions were destroyed in Dresden as Gurlitt claimed, additional portions apparently had been successfully hidden in Franconia, Saxony and Paris, from which they were retrieved after the war.

By 1947, Gurlitt had resumed trading in art works and also took up a position as Director of the Art Association for the Rhineland and Westphalia, based in Düsseldorf. In 1949 his mother died (his father, Cornelius senior, having died in 1938) and he may have inherited additional works held by the family at that time, if not previously; according to his papers (later found not to be entirely trustworthy), Monet's painting of Waterloo Bridge, subsequently one of the most valuable in the collection, was purchased by his father as a gift to his mother at some point from 1914 onwards, and had passed already to Hildebrand in 1923 as a wedding present. He continued to purchase works for his own collection, including Courbet's Village Girl with Goat for which he paid the then very large sum of 480,000 French Francs, and lent works from his collection for several travelling exhibitions: one such show, "German Watercolors, Drawings and Prints: A Mid-Century Review" included 23 works from Hildebrand's collection and toured the United States up to and beyond his premature death at age 61 in a car crash in 1956. On his death, the collection passed to his wife Helene, and on her death in 1964, mainly to their son Cornelius, with some items also passed to Cornelius' sister. Knowledge of the collection appears to have persisted in the minds of his contemporaries in the German art dealing world, and in some cases with their successors in business, but eventually – particularly with the passage of more than four decades – faded from public awareness.

The bulk of Hildebrand's collection survived with his son Cornelius, who lived a quiet, virtually reclusive life with the artworks inherited from his father for over forty years, with portions of the collection kept at his two addresses in Munich, Germany and Salzburg, Austria; additional items appear to have been held by Cornelius' sister Benita, who later married and moved away to Stuttgart with her husband. Apart from any monies inherited after his parents' deaths, Cornelius survived by selling a small number of items from the collection, notably in 1988 and 1990, with the proceeds paid into a Swiss bank account which he would visit at four- to six- week intervals to withdraw money for his living expenses. Another painting, Max Beckmann's The Lion Tamer, was sold at auction in 2011, most likely to cover medical bills; Cornelius had already agreed to share the around €800,000 proceeds equally with the heir to the Jewish family that had originally possessed the painting.

== 2012 discovery by German tax authorities ==
On 22 September 2010, German customs officials at the German–Swiss border stopped Cornelius on the return leg of one of his visits to Switzerland and found him to be carrying €9,000 in cash, within the legal limit for cash transfers across the border but which was notified as suspicious to the German tax authorities; under questioning, he explained that it was proceeds from the sale of a painting. Since Cornelius had no occupation and no obvious means of income, the tax office suspected that he might be involved in the illegal transfer of artworks across the border without paying the relevant taxes, and obtained a warrant in 2011 to search his apartment in Schwabing, Munich, to see if they could find any evidence to support their suspicion. On 28 February 2012 officials of the Augsburg Prosecutor's Office entered his apartment and found not records of past sales, but a reported 121 framed and 1,258 unframed works, the major part of the collection inherited from his father, with an initial reported worth of €1 billion (approx. $1.3 billion), although this value eventually proved to be a significant overestimate. The collection was confiscated, under a process that was subsequently challenged in court since Cornelius had committed no crime under German law; it was also subsequently claimed that the scale of the action was disproportionate to any supposed tax irregularities.

Authorities initially banned reporting on the raid, which only came to light in 2013. Initial media hysteria with sensational headlines such as "Artworks Worth $1.6 Billion, Stolen by Nazis, Discovered in German Apartment" proved to be an overstatement; writing in 2017, the German Lost Art Foundation concluded that "Looking at the art trove as a whole, it becomes clear that it is not so much a collection of highly valuable artworks worth billions as was initially assumed, but rather a mixture of family heirlooms and dealer stock. It does contain some very high quality, outstanding pieces, but most of it consists of works on paper, including a large number of serial graphic works."

Speaking to Der Spiegel magazine in November 2013, Cornelius insisted that his father had obtained the works legally and stated that he would not voluntarily return any of them to previous owners, although subsequently he said that in respect of the latter statement he was misquoted. Feeling threatened by the intense media attention, Gurlitt's brother-in-law offered 22 works in his possession to the police for safe keeping.

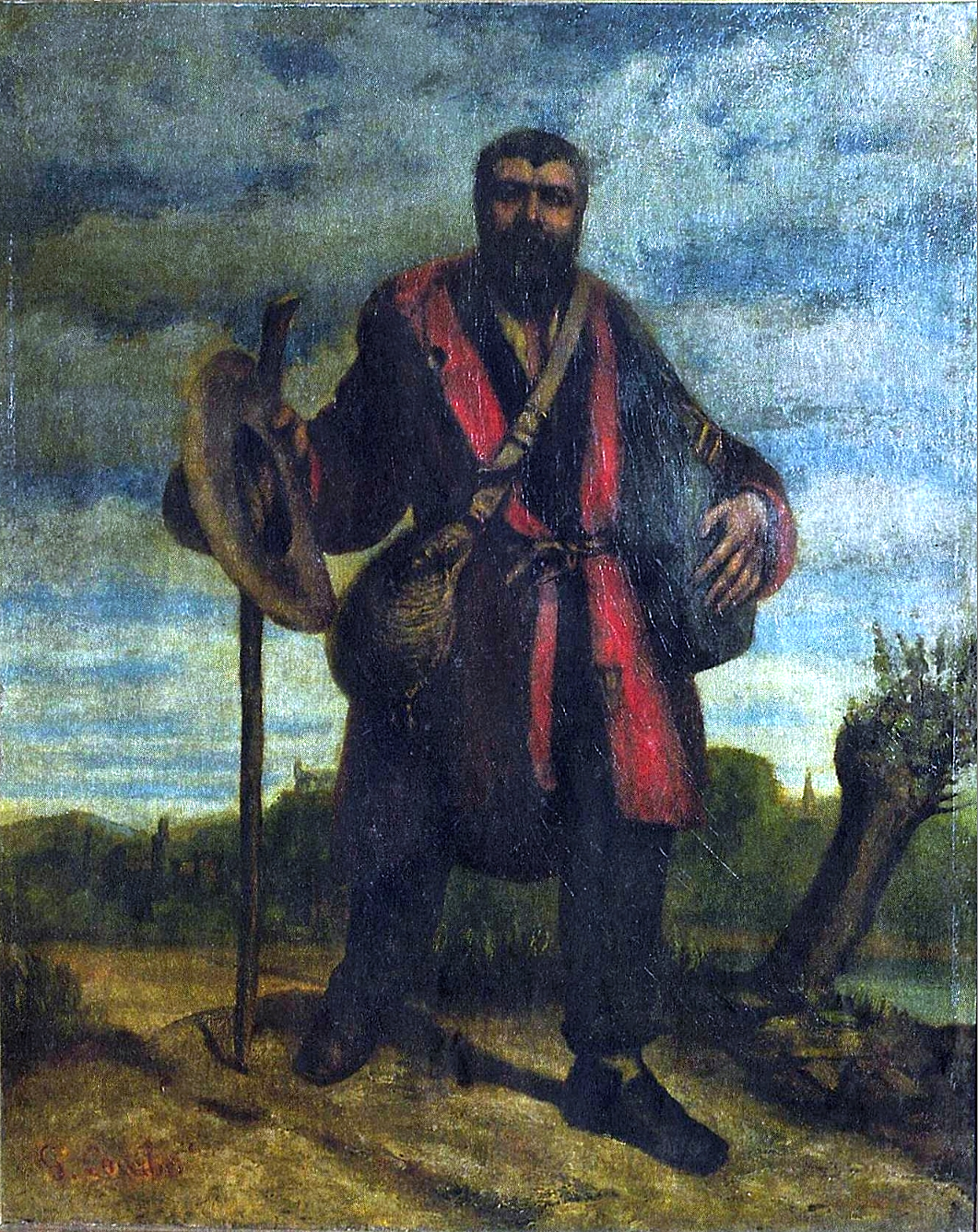
Portrait de Monsieur Jean Journet by Gustave Courbet, 1850, one of the works found in the Salzburg portion of the collection; location previously unknown since 1914.

Gurlitt repeatedly requested the return of his collection but did not obtain legal representation until December 2013 when a Munich court appointed an official "Custodian" on his behalf, Christoph Edel, who initiated action against the Prosecutor's Office for the return of the collection to Gurlitt. Gurlitt also told Edel about the additional artworks stored at his Salzburg address; Edel was given permission by Gurlitt to remove these for safe keeping, a task which was carried out in February 2014. This portion of the collection, numbering 254 items, contained works by Monet, Renoir, Gauguin, Liebermann, Toulouse-Lautrec, Courbet, Cézanne, Munch and Manet, some of extremely high quality, and were removed to a secure location where their provenance could be investigated further; the Augsburg Prosecutor's Office would not have access to them. Access to the Salzburg works was provided, in a "secret location", to BBC reporter Stephen Evans, who showed some of them in a brief video segment made available by the BBC in March 2014. One painting, Portrait de Monsieur Jean Journet by Gustave Courbet, had disappeared in 1914 and had previously been believed to have been lost during World War II.

In April 2014, Edel obtained an agreement with the Augsburg prosecutor whereby the collection confiscated in Munich was to be returned to Gurlitt in exchange for his co-operation with a government-led task force charged with returning any stolen pieces to the rightful owners which Gurlitt signed. However, Gurlitt was by then very ill and died on 6 May 2014, never seeing the paintings again. His will bequeathed all his property to the Museum of Fine Arts Bern, Switzerland, after all legitimate claims of ownership against it had been evaluated.

== Schwabing Art Trove Task Force, and successors ==
An entity called the Schwabinger Kunstfund (Schwabing Art Trove) Task Force was set up in November 2013 under the direction of Ingeborg Berggreen-Merkel to research the provenance of the paintings in the Gurlitt trove. However, after several years of operations it was widely criticized for having few results and little visibility. The taskforce initially identified around 590 works as "possibly looted", but after two years of research had published provenance reports on only five items from the collection; under a flood of criticism, the taskforce was disbanded in December 2015. "We are disappointed," said Ronald Lauder, president of the World Jewish Congress. Its activities and some of its personnel were passed to a new "Centre for Lost Cultural Property", project name "Gurlitt Provenance Research", under the direction of Dr. Andrea Baresel-Brand.

By December 2018, the Gurlitt Provenance Research project reported that it had completed its activities, with the results being presented on the German Lost Art Foundation website. 1,039 items were investigated; of these, 315 were identified as confiscated from German museums during the "degenerate art" campaign, and thus not subject to suspicion of looting, so their responsibility could be passed directly to the Kunstmuseum Bern. The remaining 724 were assessed according to a "traffic light" system: green for works "proven or highly likely not to be Nazi-looted art" (28 items); yellow for "provenance during the period between 1933 and 1945 is not entirely clear; there are gaps in the provenance", i.e., requiring further investigation (650 items); and red for works "proven or highly likely to be Nazi-looted art" (4 items). A further 42 works were not reviewed, but also believed not to represent looted artworks, either because they could be assigned to additional works known to originate from German museums (22 items), be commercially mass-produced goods (2 items), or have a reasonable explanation for their presence in Gurlitt family holdings, for example being created by family members, and/or created after 1945 (18 items). These "traffic light" categorizations are carried through to the complete lists of items as published on the Kunstmuseum Bern website.

== Death of Cornelius Gurlitt, and after ==
Cornelius Gurlitt died on 6 May 2014. In his will, written shortly before his death, Cornelius named the Museum of Fine Arts Bern (Kunstmuseum Bern) in Switzerland as his sole heir. People close to Gurlitt told an American newspaper that he decided to give the collection to a foreign institution because he felt that Germany had treated him and his father badly. The legacy included the paintings Cornelius had kept in Salzburg, which German authorities had not confiscated because their remit did not extend to property held in Austria. His decision created further controversy over the appropriateness of the museum accepting this bequest. The will stipulated that the museum would be required to research the provenance of the paintings and make restitution as appropriate. The museum decided to initially accept only those works for which original legal ownership by the Gurlitts could be established, including items acquired from the "degenerate art" collection and those passed down from other family members, and has entered into a joint agreement with German and Swiss authorities about the further researching of items in this bequest.

Cornelius' family (cousins) also entered the discussion, raising questions about the legality of the will, based on his state of mind at the time. His cousin, Uta Werner, filed a claim of inheritance on the artwork. Werner's lawyer, Wolfgang Seybold, argued that Gurlitt's relatives were the rightful heirs; however this claim was rejected by relevant authorities. Around 590 pieces remain in Germany pending further investigation to determine whether they were confiscated from individuals under the Nazi regime, and a further 380 have been definitively identified as removed from museums by the Nazis as "degenerate art" so will pass to Bern without further obstruction.

Art objects continued to surface after Cornelius' death. In July 2014, a new discovery was made in his Munich apartment: a Rodin marble and a Degas sculpture, along with some Roman, Greek, Egyptian and Asian objects, which had been missed when the apartment was originally searched in 2012. In September, an early pastel landscape by Claude Monet was discovered in a suitcase Gurlitt had left in the last hospital where he had stayed.

== Value ==
Initial media reports that the collection was worth in excess of $1 billion, based apparently on its size alone plus descriptions of one or two contained works, have proved to be an over-estimate, considering that a substantial component of the collection contains printed graphic works on paper whose individual value may be no more than €1,000 per item. Nevertheless, the collection does contain a number of significant, high value items including, among others, a Claude Monet painting "valued at $12 million", a Matisse painting ("$20 million"), a major Cézanne 1897 painting La Montagne Sainte-Victoire, as well as Liebermann's Two Riders on the Beach which subsequently realised almost 1.9 million pounds at auction (see below), and others including original works by Manet, Degas, Renoir and more; in 2019 it was also reported that the Manet painting, Marine, Temps d'Orage ("Ships at Sea in Stormy Weather") had been sold for US$4 million to Tokyo's National Museum of Western Art. In 2020, it was reported that Paul Signac's 1887 painting Quai de Clichy. Temps Gris, which had been returned to the heirs of the original owner, had been consigned for auction and was estimated to sell for up to £800,000.

The overall value of the collection as held by Cornelius Gurlitt in 2012 may thus conservatively be stated to have been in the order of at least several tens of millions of dollars, although no official valuation has ever been publicly released.

== Legal issues ==
German newspapers questioned the prosecutor's right to seize the collection. Property rights in cases of works of art acquired during the Nazi period are highly complex. After the war the Nazi law legalizing possession of stolen works of "degenerate art" was deliberately upheld by the Allied Control Council in order that the trade in artworks could continue.

Unlike in Austria, where the Kunstrückgabegesetz 1998 (Art Return Law 1998) regulates the return of Nazi-looted art, there is no law in effect in Germany requiring the return of Nazi-looted art, as long as the items in question can be proven to have been, at any point in time, legally acquired. As signatories of the 1998 Washington Agreement, Germany agreed that all of its public institutions would check their inventories for Nazi-looted goods and return them if found. However, this is on a strictly voluntary basis and, 15 years later, very few museums and libraries have done so. Individuals are under no legal requirement whatsoever to return Nazi-looted art. A failure on the part of the German government to return the rightful possessions of Cornelius Gurlitt might have been a violation of his property rights as guaranteed in the German constitution.

On 4 December 2013, prominent German art historian Sibylle Ehringhaus, who was one of the first experts to view the artworks in the spring of 2012, gave an interview in the newspaper Augsburger Allgemeine, demanding the immediate return of the complete collection to Gurlitt. However, she had looked at the works very briefly and had not researched their provenance because, as she stated in the interview, "Cornelius Gurlitt commissioned neither myself nor anyone else" to perform such research. Chief Prosecutor Reinhard Nemetz vehemently denied her appeal, yet apparently failed to cite any concrete legal grounds for the seizure.

On 20 November 2014, the German jurist Jutta Limbach, the head of the Limbach Commission on Nazi-looted art, confirmed the opinion of the German Süddeutsche Zeitung newspaper that the Bavarian "State Prosecutor used an incorrect application of the tax liability law to seize" the artworks of Cornelius Gurlitt.

== November 2014 and onwards ==
=== Swiss museum acceptance ===
On 24 November 2014, the Museum of Fine Arts Bern agreed to accept the Gurlitt estate. Museum officials stated that no art looted by the Nazis would be permitted to enter the museum's collection. Some 500 works were to remain in Germany until their rightful owners could be identified.

=== Nazi-looted artworks identified for return to original owners ===
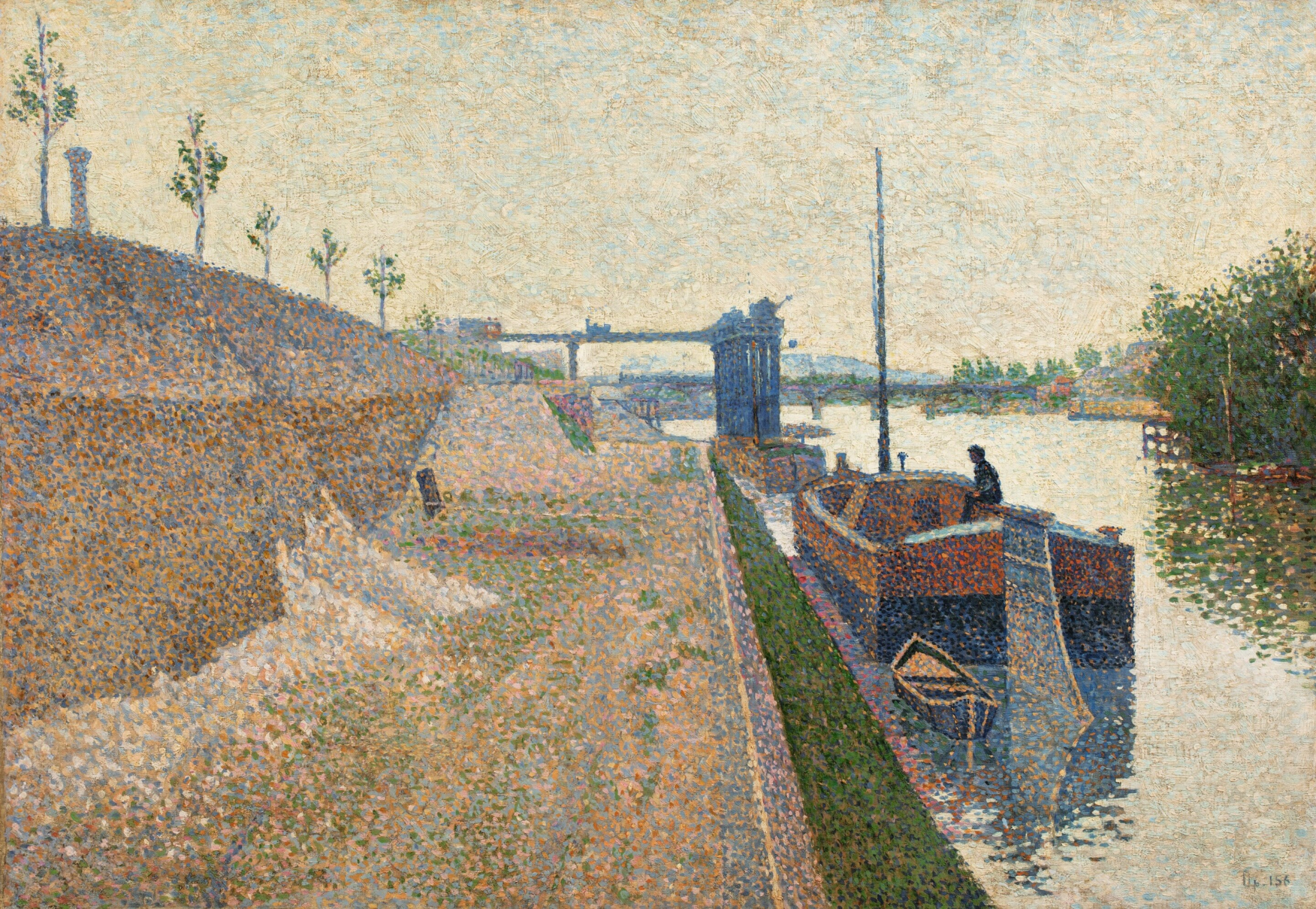
Quai de Clichy, Temps gris by Paul Signac

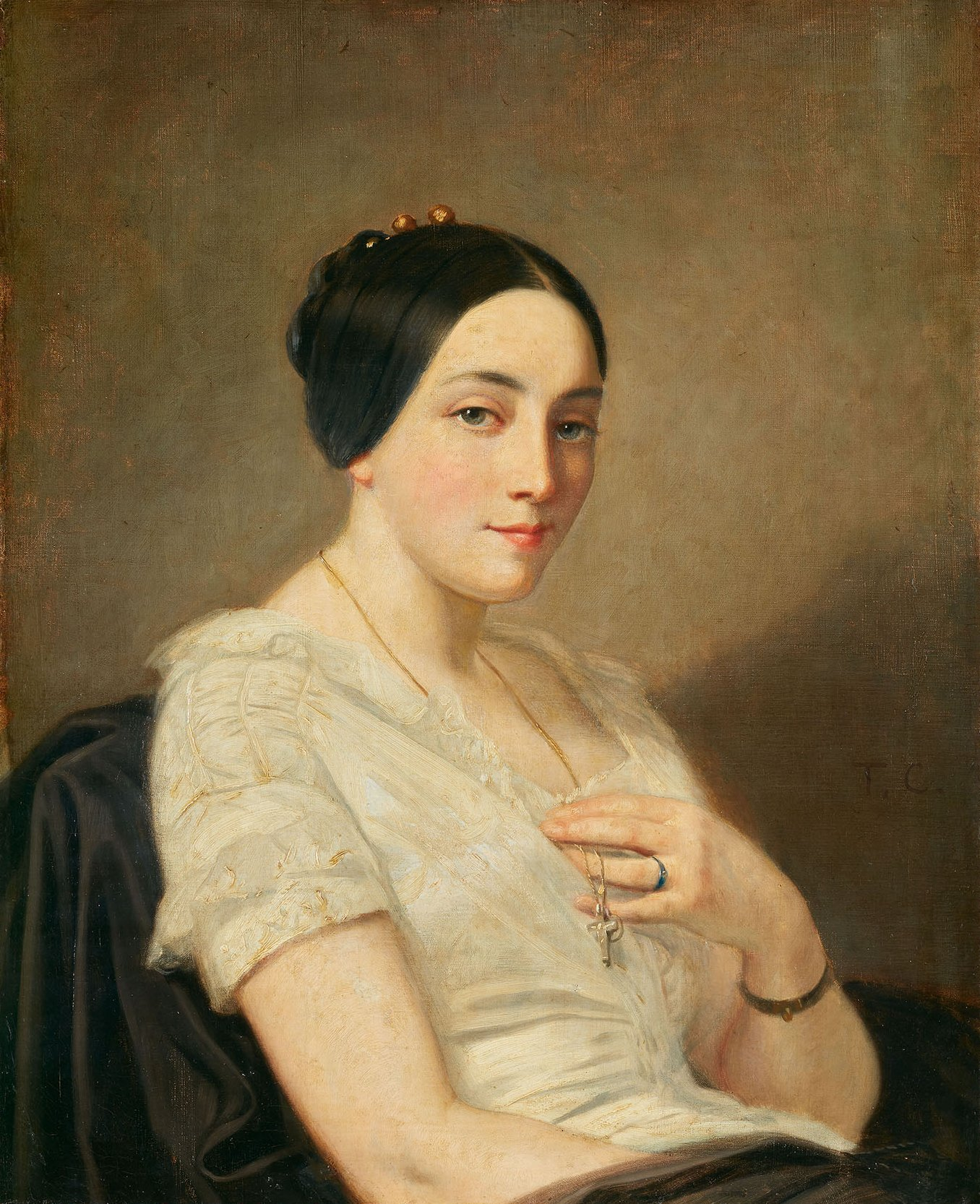
Portrait of a Seated Woman by Thomas Couture

Three pieces were singled out for immediate return: Henri Matisse's Femme Assise to the descendants of the Jewish art dealer Paul Rosenberg; Max Liebermann's Two Riders on the Beach to the great-nephew of the industrialist and art collector David Friedmann; and Carl Spitzweg's Playing the Piano to the heirs of music publisher Henri Hinrichsen, who was murdered at Auschwitz. Two Riders on the Beach was subsequently auctioned at Sotheby's, London in June 2015, where it fetched the unexpectedly high price of almost 1.9 million pounds; Playing the Piano took longer to be returned to Hinrichsen's descendants as the family tree was more complex and there were more legal issues to be overcome, but was eventually restituted in 2021 and consigned to the auction house Christie's, by whom it is expected to be sold. In 2017, it was announced that the Camille Pissarro painting La Seine vue du Pont-Neuf, au fond le Louvre, found in Gurlitt's Salzburg house had been restituted to the heirs of Max Heilbronn, a Paris businessman from whom it had been confiscated in 1942, and that a drawing by Adolph von Menzel Interior of a Gothic Church had been returned to the descendants of Elsa Helene Cohen. In October 2017 it was announced that the painting Portrait of a Seated Woman by Thomas Couture had been identified as a looted work and would be returned to the descendants of the original owner, Jewish French politician Georges Mandel (the actual return taking place in January 2019), and in September 2018 four drawings by the artists Charles-Dominique-Joseph Eisen, Augustin de Saint-Aubin and Anne Vallayer-Coster that were among items previously sold by Benita Gurlitt were identified as originally stolen and would also be returned by their new owner. In March 2019, it was announced that the painting Quai de Clichy by Paul Signac, purchased by Hildebrand Gurlitt in Paris in the 1940s, had also been identified as Nazi-confiscated art, having been seized in 1940 by German soldiers from the apartment of French real estate broker Gaston Prosper Lévy, and that "a claim has been registered for the return of the painting". The work was eventually handed back in July 2019. By May 2020, 14 artworks had been returned, with a further 7 identified for additional return to heirs of their original owners, including two 1922 watercolors by Otto Dix entitled Dompteuse and Dame in der Loge.

A slightly different case was presented by Paul Cézanne's 1897 painting La Montagne Sainte-Victoire, possibly the most prestigious in the entire trove, which was known to have been in the Cézanne family in 1940, and appeared in Gurlitt's holdings some time between then and 1947, when Gurlitt mentions the painting in a letter; however, its status as a looted item could not be unequivocally established. In 2018, in what has been described as a "historic agreement", Cézanne's great-grandson has acknowledged the Bern museum's ownership of the work in exchange for the ability to exhibit it in the artist's hometown; exhibition rights to the painting will thus be shared between the Kunstmuseum Bern and the Musée Granet in Aix-en-Provence.

=== Public displays ===
The first public display of pieces from the Gurlitt Collection took place at an exhibition curated by the Bern Fine Art Museum, running from November 2017 to March 2018, which featured 160 works from the Cornelius Gurlitt bequest, which had previously formed part of the original 1937 "degenerate art" exhibition. Concurrently, an exhibition of some 250 works whose status was uncertain was displayed in Bonn, Germany, entitled "Gurlitt: Status Report – An Art Dealer in Nazi Germany", including works from Dürer to Monet and from Cranach to Kirchner and Rodin; both shows were then scheduled to travel to be displayed at the Martin-Gropius-Bau exhibition hall in Berlin. In September 2019, a selection of 110 items from the Collection were displayed in Jerusalem at the Israel Museum under the title "Fateful Choices: Art from the Gurlitt Trove".

== Contents ==
=== Documentation ===
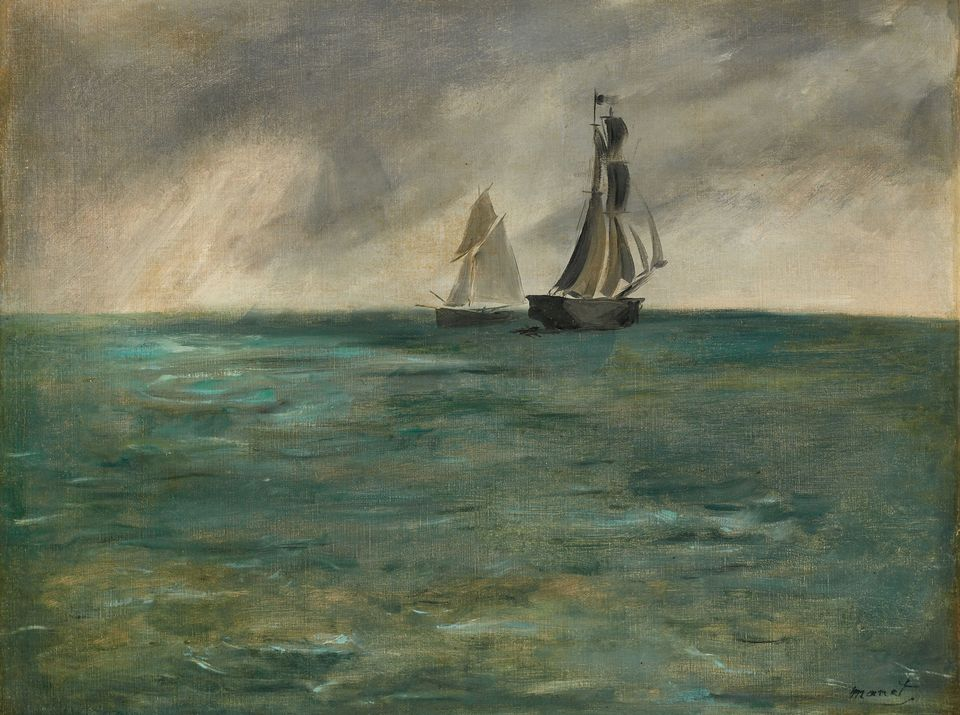
Marine, Temps d'Orage (c.1864 – c.1868) by Édouard Manet, one of the oil paintings from Cornelius' Salzburg house; subsequently (2019) sold by the Bern Museum of Fine Arts to Tokyo's National Museum of Western Art

The content of the collection previously in the possession of Cornelius Gurlitt has been gradually documented over the several years since its rediscovery, especially since November 2014 when the Museum of Fine Arts in Bern legally accepted the Gurlitt estate. Two listings, which are believed to be complete, are available online, one for the items originally in the Munich apartment (approximately 1,350 records) and one for the Salzburg items (254 records). The lists are described as "works in progress" and are subject to update or amendment as new information is available. The Munich list runs to 196 pages, and the Salzburg list runs to 95 pages.

=== Works held (and in some cases sold) by other family members ===
In addition to the works owned by Cornelius, his sister Benita inherited some works from the collection; reportedly, in 2013, 22 of these were voluntarily surrendered to police for "safe keeping" by the by-then deceased Benita's husband, Nikolaus Frässle, previously kept at their home in Stuttgart. Details of these works have not been released except that they included four medieval paintings which belonged to Cornelius, which were then added to his estate. Benita had also consigned some items for sale at a previous date, including four drawings, originally the property of the Jewish Deutsch de la Meurthe family in Paris, which were voluntarily returned to representatives of the family in 2018 by the unnamed present owner (see above section "Works identified for return to original owners"). Benita's husband Nikolaus also consigned Max Liebermann's pastel drawing The Basket Weavers for sale via a Berlin auction house in 2000, where it sold to a private Israeli collector for DM 130,000 (around US$70,000), more than double its pre-sale estimate. Following a 2016 legal action against the auction house to reveal the identity of the purchaser, that person (a Holocaust survivor) was traced and agreed to sell the painting back to David Toren, heir of the original owner from whom it was stolen by the Nazis, for the original auction price paid, and the work has subsequently been on display at the New York Center for Jewish History.

=== Other works previously sold ===
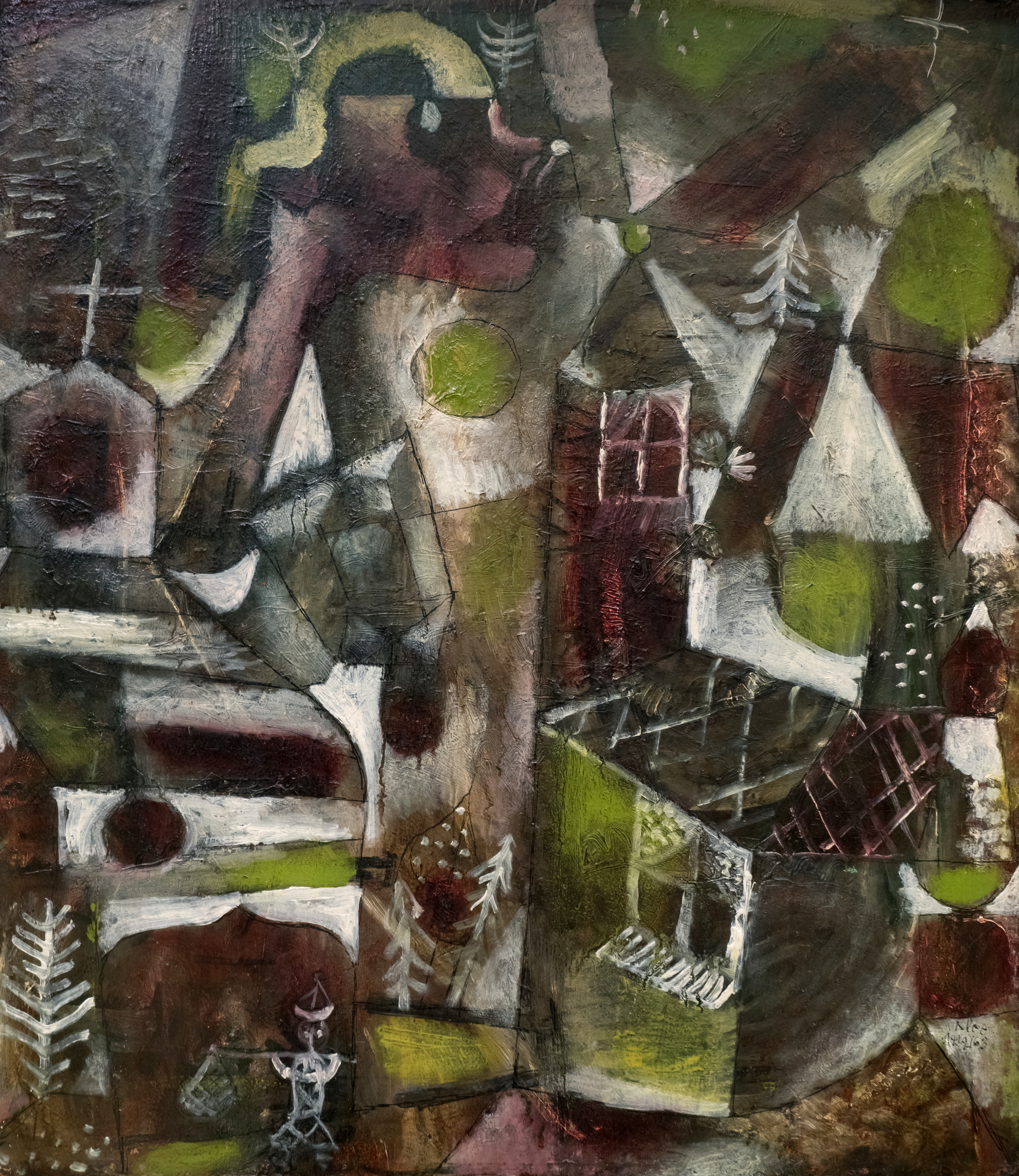
Swamp Legend by Paul Klee, in the Collection at Hildebrand's death, subsequently sold (presumed by Helene) in or before 1962

Other paintings which had previously been in the collection but sold prior to its 2012 rediscovery included a Paul Klee landscape painting sold by Hildebrand in 1950, the Picasso Portrait of a Woman with Two Noses and two items by Rudolf Schlichter and Georg Schrimpf sold by Helene in 1960 as noted above, Beckmann's Bar, Brown and The Lion Tamer by Cornelius, and Macke's Woman with a Parrot, which was sold in 2007 for €2.4 million and (according to Hickley) was most likely consigned by Benita. The eleven works sold by Cornelius in 1988 included a Degas pastel and items by Otto Dix, Erich Heckel, Christian Rohlfs, Max Pechstein and Otto Müller; according to gallery owner Eberhard Kornfeld, Cornelius also sold four other works on paper via him in 1990, originally from the 1937 "degenerate art" holdings. Paul Klee's Swamp Legend, purchased by Hildebrand from the "degenerate art" holdings, was still in his possession at his death and then sold some time between 1956 and 1962 (when it appeared at auction), probably by his widow; after several changes of ownership, this work ended up in Munich's Lenbachhaus Museum, where in 2015 it was under protracted legal action from the heirs of original owner Sophie Lissitzky-Küppers for its restitution. An agreement was finally reached in 2017 for the Museum to retain the painting but for compensation (estimated at €2–4 million, or $2.33–4.65 million) to be paid to the heirs of the original owner.

=== Other information ===
A supposedly signed, but previously unknown, Marc Chagall work Allegorical scene with embracing lovers, held by Hildebrand Gurlitt since at least 1945, was examined by the Comité Chagall, the definitive authority on the artist's work, in 2015 and was determined to be a forgery ("counterfeit work"). The Gurlitt Provenance Research Project was unable to document the painting's ownership prior to its acquisition by Hildebrand during the war years; however, according to a 2013 newspaper report, the painting had originally been seized by the Gestapo from Jewish art collector Savely Blumstein in Riga in 1941, who soon after fled to the United States with his brother Salomon. Blumstein's surviving family registered several paintings that were confiscated by the Gestapo on the German Lost Art Foundation database, including André Derain's Portrait of a Girl, Salomon van Ruysdael's Waterscape, Dirck Hals Group Picture, and twenty others.

Other works in the collection are by Gurlitt family members, which include 90 by Cornelius' great-grandfather, the landscape painter Louis Gurlitt, and 130 by Cornelia Gurlitt, Cornelius' aunt, a talented but relatively unknown artist who died in tragic circumstances in 1919. A page of putative drawings by Henry Moore, also in the collection, was investigated in an episode of the BBC TV programme Fake or Fortune? and found to be not only genuine, but also to have been legitimately purchased from a London exhibition by the artist in 1931 by Dr Max Sauerlandt, head of the Museum für Kunst und Gewerbe in Hamburg; from there the drawing entered the confiscated, "degenerate art" exhibition and was subsequently purchased by Hildebrand Gurlitt in 1940, remaining undocumented to curators of Moore's legacy until its emergence in the holdings of Cornelius Gurlitt in 2012.

In order to defray some of the ongoing costs associated with managing the collection, in 2019 it was reported that the Bern Museum of Fine Art had agreed to sell the Manet painting, Marine, Temps d'Orage ("Ships at Sea in Stormy Weather") to Tokyo's National Museum of Western Art, for US$4 million. This painting was previously owned by Japanese industrialist Kōjirō Matsukata before the Second World War, who left the painting in Europe under the safe keeping of Kôsaburô Hioki, a retired Japanese navy officer. Hioki subsequently sold a number of paintings from the collection, including Marine, Temps d'Orage, in order to raise funds to safeguard the others; Hildebrand Gurlitt had acquired it in Paris in the 1940s. The Tokyo National Museum of Western Art was "thrilled to announce the purchase of [the painting]"... since it was part of the focus of "a great effort to reunite the collection" originally belonging to Matsukata, under a single roof.

== See also ==
- Looted art
- Nazi plunder
- List of claims for restitution for Nazi-looted art
- The Holocaust

== Bibliography ==
- Hickley, Catherine. "The Munich Art Hoard: Hitler's Dealer and his Secret Legacy." Thames & Hudson, London, 2015, 272 pp. ISBN 9780500292570
- Ronald, Susan. "Hitler's Art Thief: Hildebrand Gurlitt, the Nazis, and the Looting of Europe's Treasures." St. Martin's Press, New York, 400 pp. ISBN 9781250061096
- Collins, Jacob R. "The Gurlitt Trove: Its Past, Present and Future". Undergraduate Thesis, University of Vermont, 2016, 54 pp.
