= Gurlitt (surname) =

Gurlitt is a German surname derived from an ancient German personal name Gauralt, from Gorolt, or from Gorlet, which derived from Gaurald. The name is most notably held by the Gurlitt family.

Notable people with the surname include:

- Cornelia Gurlitt (1890–1919), German artist
- Cornelius Gurlitt (1932–2014), German art collection owner
- Cornelius Gurlitt (1850–1938), German architect and art historian
- Cornelius Gurlitt (1820–1901), German composer
- Emanuel Gurlitt (1826–1896), German watchmaker, writer, and mayor
- Fritz Gurlitt (1854–1893), German art dealer and collector
- Hildebrand Gurlitt (1895–1956), German art historian and Nazi art dealer
- Johann Friedrich Karl Gurlitt (1802–1864), German theologian
- Johann Gottfried Gurlitt (1754–1827), German philologist and school teacher
- Louis Gurlitt (1812–1897), Danish-German painter
- Ludwig Gurlitt (1855–1931), German educator
- Manfred Gurlitt (1890–1972), German opera composer and conductor
- Wilibald Gurlitt (1889–1963), German musicologist
- Wolfgang Gurlitt (1888–1965), German art dealer and museum director
