= Gurlitt family =

German family

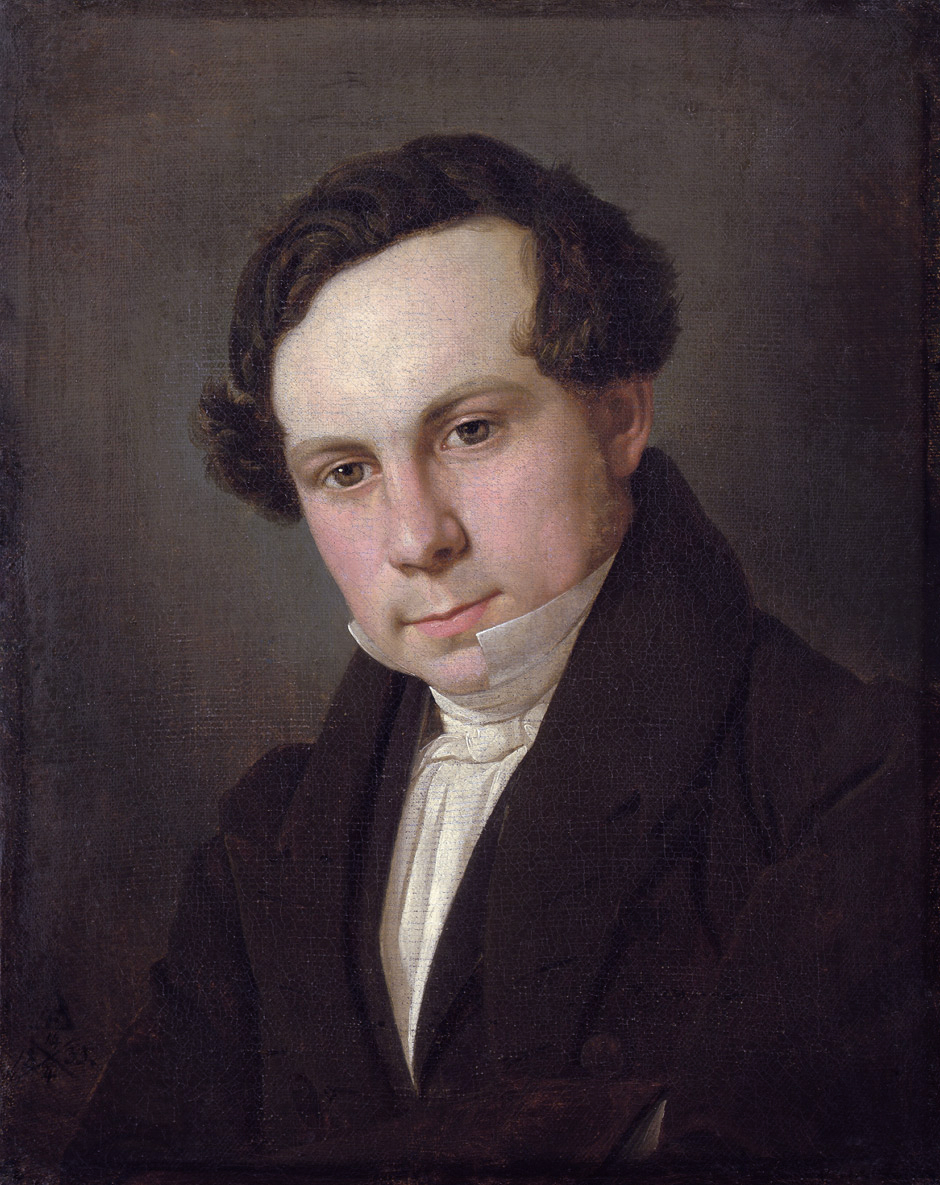
Louis Gurlitt, 1833

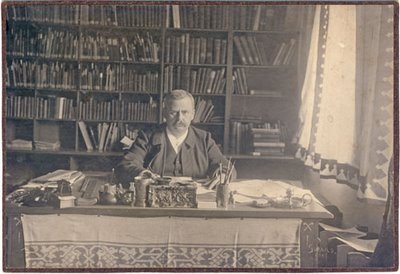
Art historian Cornelius Gurlitt, in 1905

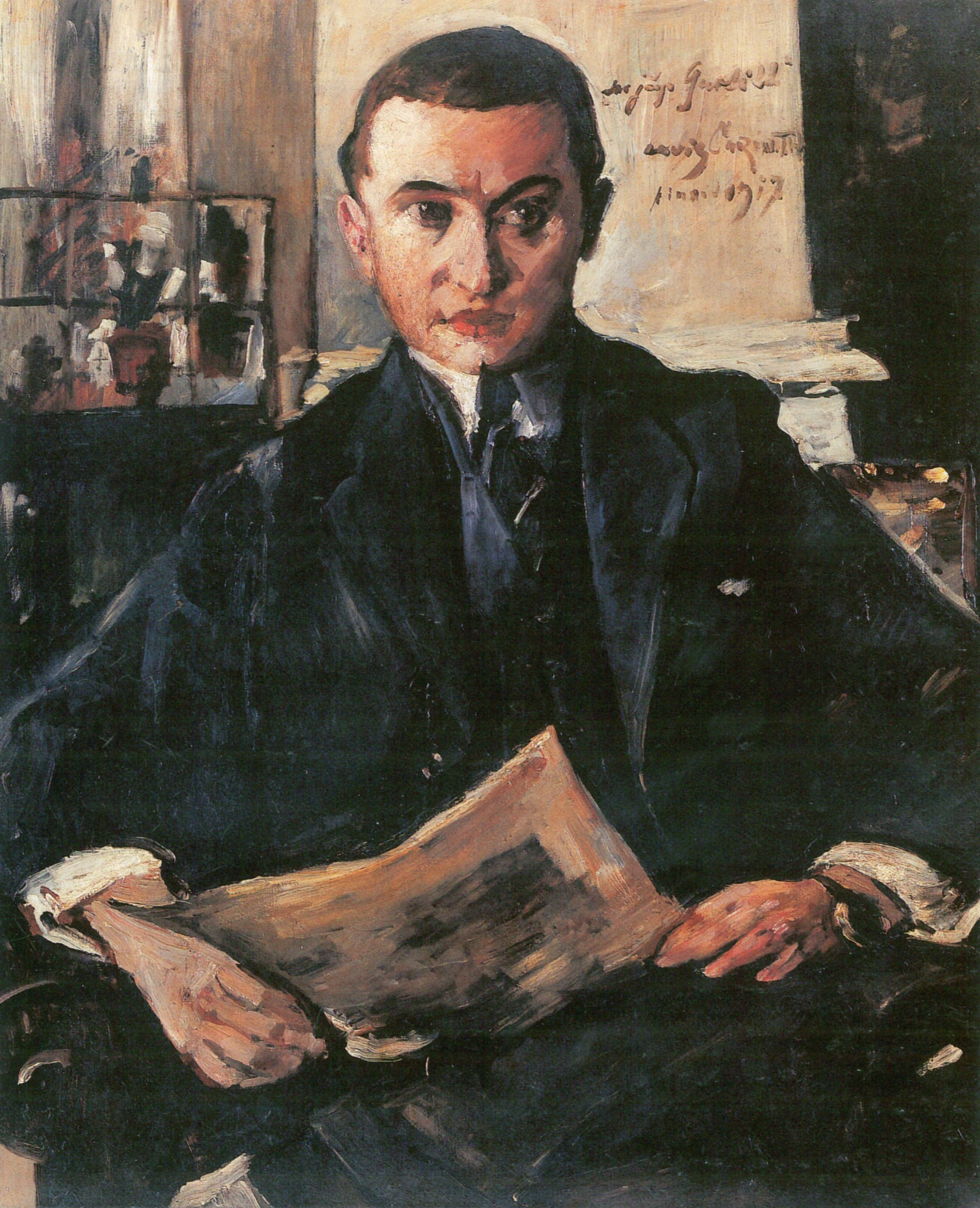
Lovis Corinth: Wolfgang Gurlitt, 1917

Gurlitt is a German family. Notable members include:

1. Johann August Wilhelm Gurlitt (1774–1855), fabricant. Son of Gottlieb Wilhelm Gurlitt and Katharina Ester Gurlitt. His wife was Helene Eberstein. They had 15 children.
  1. Cornelius Gurlitt (composer) (1820–1901) – composer, conductor.
  2. Louis Gurlitt (1812–1879) – Danish-German landscape painter. His uncle was the painter Eugen Krüger. His third wife was Elisabeth, née Lewalds (Fanny Lewald's sister). Her Jewish background caused problems for their issue during the Nazi era. He had 7 children.
    1. Wilhelm Gurlitt (1844–1905) - archaeologist.
    2. Cornelius Gurlitt (art historian) (1850–1938) – art historian.
      1. Wilibald Gurlitt (1889–1963) – musicologist.
      2. Cornelia Gurlitt (1890–1919) – expressionist painter.
      3. Hildebrand Gurlitt (1895–1956) – art dealer and historian, compiler of the Gurlitt Collection.
        1. Cornelius Gurlitt (art collector) (1932–2014) – inheritor of the Gurlitt Collection from Hildebrand Gurlitt, his father.
    3. Fritz Gurlitt (1854–1893) – art collector.
      1. Wolfgang Gurlitt (1888–1965) – art dealer and collector, publisher. Son of Fritz and Annarella Gurlitt (sculptor Heinrich Max Imhof's daughter).
      2. Manfred Gurlitt (1890–1972) – opera composer and conductor, long active in Japan. Son of Annarella and either Fritz or her second husband Willi Waldecker.
    4. Ludwig Gurlitt (1855–1931) – progressive pedagogue, patron of the back-to-nature youth organization Wandervogel.
