= Othello (Corinth) =

Painting by Lovis Corinth

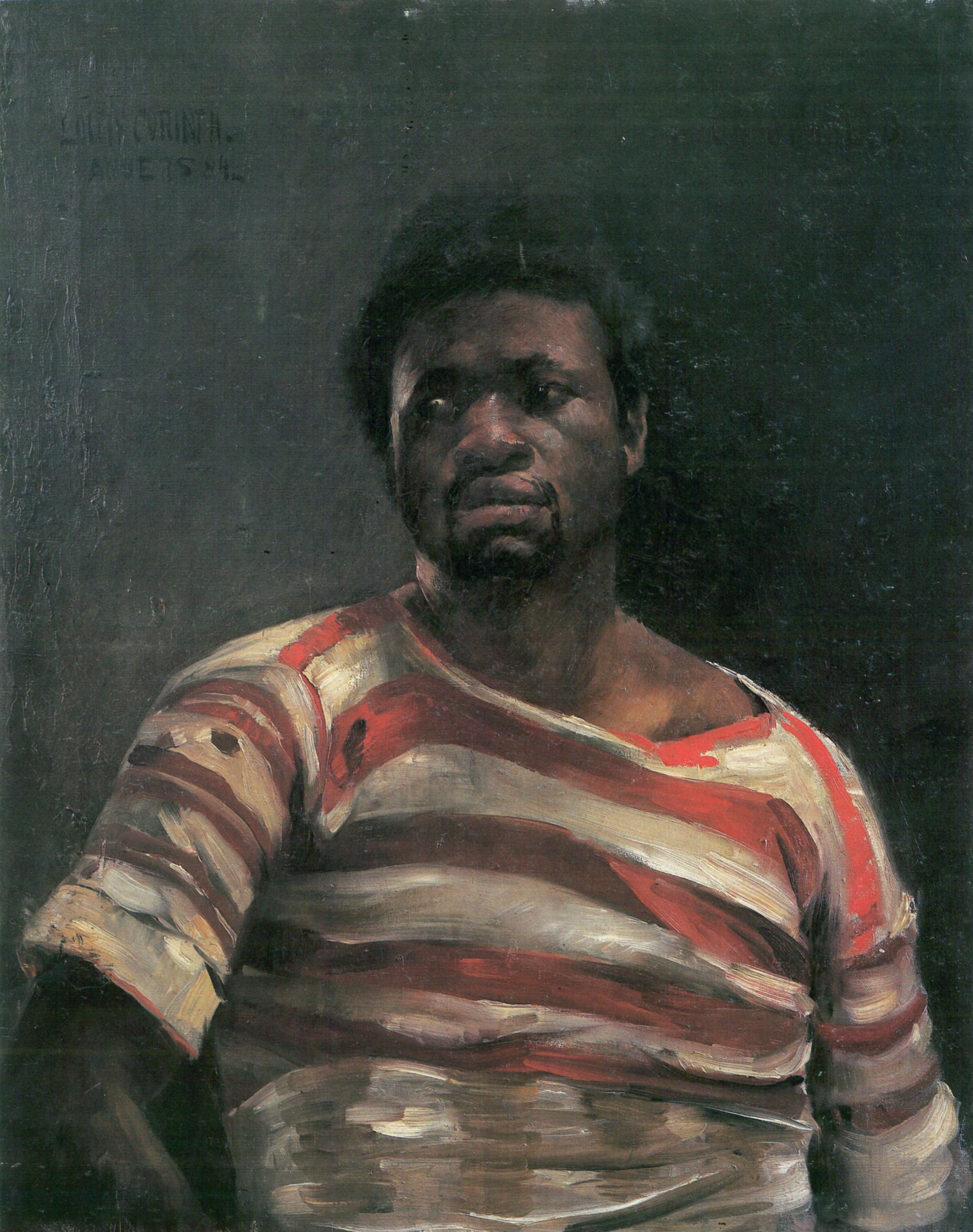
- Artist: Lovis Corinth
- Year: 1884
- Medium: Oil on canvas
- Dimensions: 78 cm × 58.5 cm (31 in × 23.0 in)
- Location: Private collection

Othello, also known as Sailor, is an oil on canvas painting by the German painter Lovis Corinth, from 1884. It is a bust portrait of a black man who was a dock worker or sailor from the port of Antwerp, Belgium. The artist signed the painting in the upper left and titled it in the upper right with the words: "Un Othello". It was in the Lentos Art Museum, in Linz, since 1953, until when it was restituted to the family of his former owners, and later auctioned, in 2015. It is now in a private collection.

== History ==
The painting is an early work by Corinth and was made during a staying in Antwerp. In 1884, Corinth went there for three months and studied under Belgian painter Paul Eugène Gorge, in whose studio he made this canvas and also a portrait of Gorge himself. The man portrayed is a dock worker or a sailor from Antwerp. Lothar Brauner places this painting in the tradition and under the influence of Frans Hals, but states that Corinth probably did not know his paintings at the time.

== Description ==
The painting shows a dark-skinned man in front of a deep gray background, with his upper body slightly turned to the left. The man's face is turned towards the viewer. He wears a holey wool shirt with red and white horizontal stripes and a wide collar, which is painted very roughly. Only the upper arms and a part of the forearm on the right are visible; the shirt ends just before the elbow joint.

Due to his dark skin and black hair as well because of the black-gray background, his facial features aren't entirely recognizable; his hair also seems to blend into the background. The face itself is made uneasy by strong lighting. The man has a small beard and looks to the left side with an apparent sense of unease.

The portrait makes a comparison between the anonymous model and the title character of William Shakespeare's play Othello, like if he was a modern days counterpart. This was made probably to highlight the model's strength and pride, more than to give him any aristocratic or leadership conotation.

== Analysis ==
Art historian Friedrich Gross compares the current painting with the Orientalist work Baschi-Bazouk, by French academic painter Jean-Léon Gérôme, in order to highlight the differences between the two portraits of black men, especially in terms of their sensuality. In comparison to Corinth's Othello, the black soldier portrayed by Gérôme shows "calm, security, pride, reinforced by his respect-inspiring outfit", while Othello appears somewhat excited. The formal sensuality of the Gérôme painting is characterized by a restrained depiction and fine coordination of the distribution of light and dark, while in Corinth's painting a "conscious dissolution into color spots" and the use of violent brushstrokes dominate it. The strong light-dark contrasts created by the coarse shirt and the lighting on the face makes it look uneasy. According to Gross' analysis, Corinth's portrait belongs "in the humanistic tradition of psychologically profound representations of the Negro, from Rembrandt van Rijn and Frans Hals to Géricault" to "the 'modern' realism that strives for immediate truth to life."

== Provenance ==
The painting was first owned by R. Brackl in Munich, and afterwards it passed through three different owners, the last being the Jewish couple Jean and Ida Baer, in Berlin. Later it came into the possession of the art collector Wolfgang Gurlitt, in Munich, who acquired it in 1953 for the Neue Galerie der Stadt Linz (now Lentos Art Museum, in Linz). In 2015, it was restituted by the museum to the heirs of Jean and Ida Baer, and sold on their behalf on 21 May 2015 at an auction held by Sotheby's, in London, for £353,000, well above the £50,000-70,000 estimate.
