= Gurlitt =

Gurlitt may refer to:

- Gurlitt (surname), a German surname
- Gurlitt family, a German family
- Gurlitt Collection, a collection of art works inherited by art collector Cornelius Gurlitt
