= Cornelius Gurlitt =

Cornelius Gurlitt may refer to:

- Cornelius Gurlitt (composer) (1820–1901), German composer
- Cornelius Gurlitt (art historian) (1850–1938), German art historian and architect (nephew of the elder Cornelius Gurlitt)
- Cornelius Gurlitt (art collector) (1932–2014), grandson of the art historian, inheritor of the Gurlitt Collection of artworks assembled by his father Hildebrand Gurlitt
