= Kites (Spitzweg) =

Painting by Carl Spitzweg

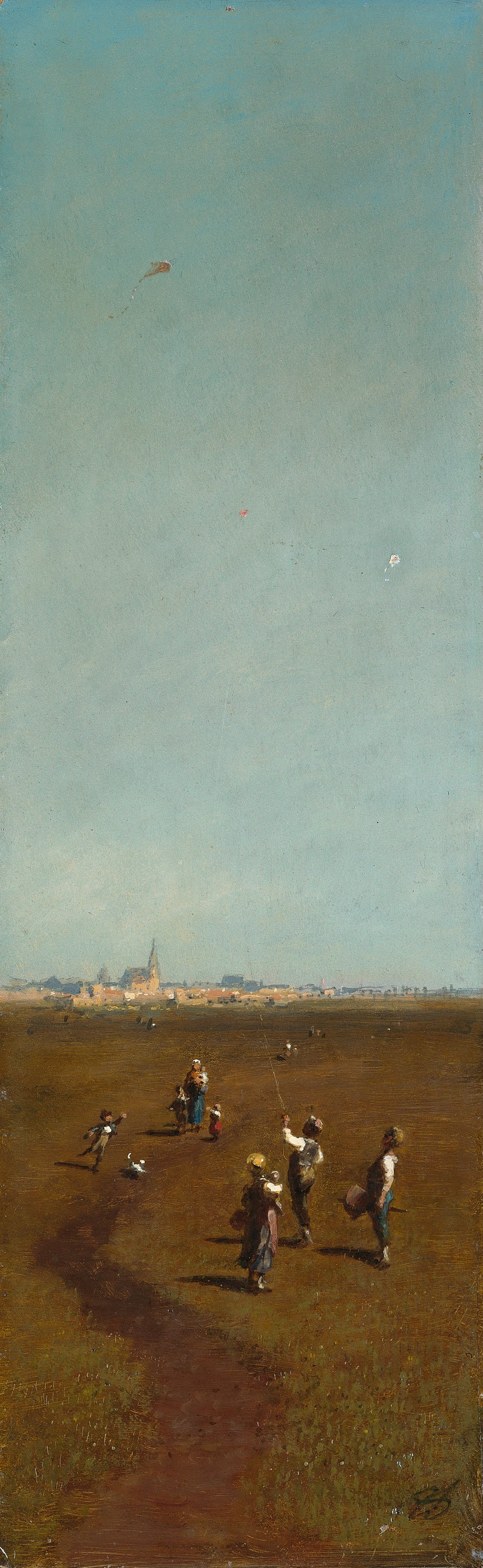
- Artist: Carl Spitzweg
- Year: 1880-1885
- Medium: oil on card
- Dimensions: 38 cm × 12 cm (15 in × 4.7 in)
- Location: Alte Nationalgalerie, Berlin

Kites (German: Drachensteigen) is an oil on card painting by Carl Spitzweg, executed in 1880–1885, now in the Alte Nationalgalerie in Berlin, which acquired it from the Fritz Gurlitt gallery in Berlin, in 1908.

== Description ==
In the foreground of the lower third of the picture, three children are standing on a green-brown meadow: a boy, with the string in his hand, looks up at his kite, another boy with a kite under his arm follows his gaze, while a girl with a doll stands with her back to the viewer. The small group is approached by a woman with four other children on a snaking, earthy brown path. Only hinted can be seen on the meadow in the background other people and beyond, on the horizon line, the church and the houses of a city. Angelika Wesenberg believes that the Theresienwiese, Spitzweg's place of residence in Munich, can be recognized in the meadow. The upper two thirds of the painting are dominated by the light blue, a cloudless sky, in which three kite dragons can be seen as small spots.

== Analysis ==
During his review of the Spitzweg exhibition held in the Haus der Kunst in 2003, art critic Benedikt Erenz explained that Kites is one of the most beautiful pictures of Spitzweg, because the painter "releases the colors and lets them tell their own story... He transformed a banal scene into an eternal view over childhood".

The Süddeutsche Zeitung, on October 17, 2008, described the painting as "huge", despite its small size. The lower third of the picture shows "earthly life", the upper two thirds a "truly infinite sky", and the dragon is a "magical, if not sacred object, an extraterrestrial appearance". It remains the painter's secret where the wind necessary for kite flying comes from if the sky is completely clear.

Art historian Angelika Wesenberg refers in the catalog of the Alte Nationalgalerie that the simple (horizontal) composition is daringly broken through by the vertical path and the kite line.

== Provenance ==
The Alte Nationalgalerie acquired the painting in 1908 from Galerie Fritz Gurlitt in Berlin.
