= Lentos Art Museum =

Art museum in Austria

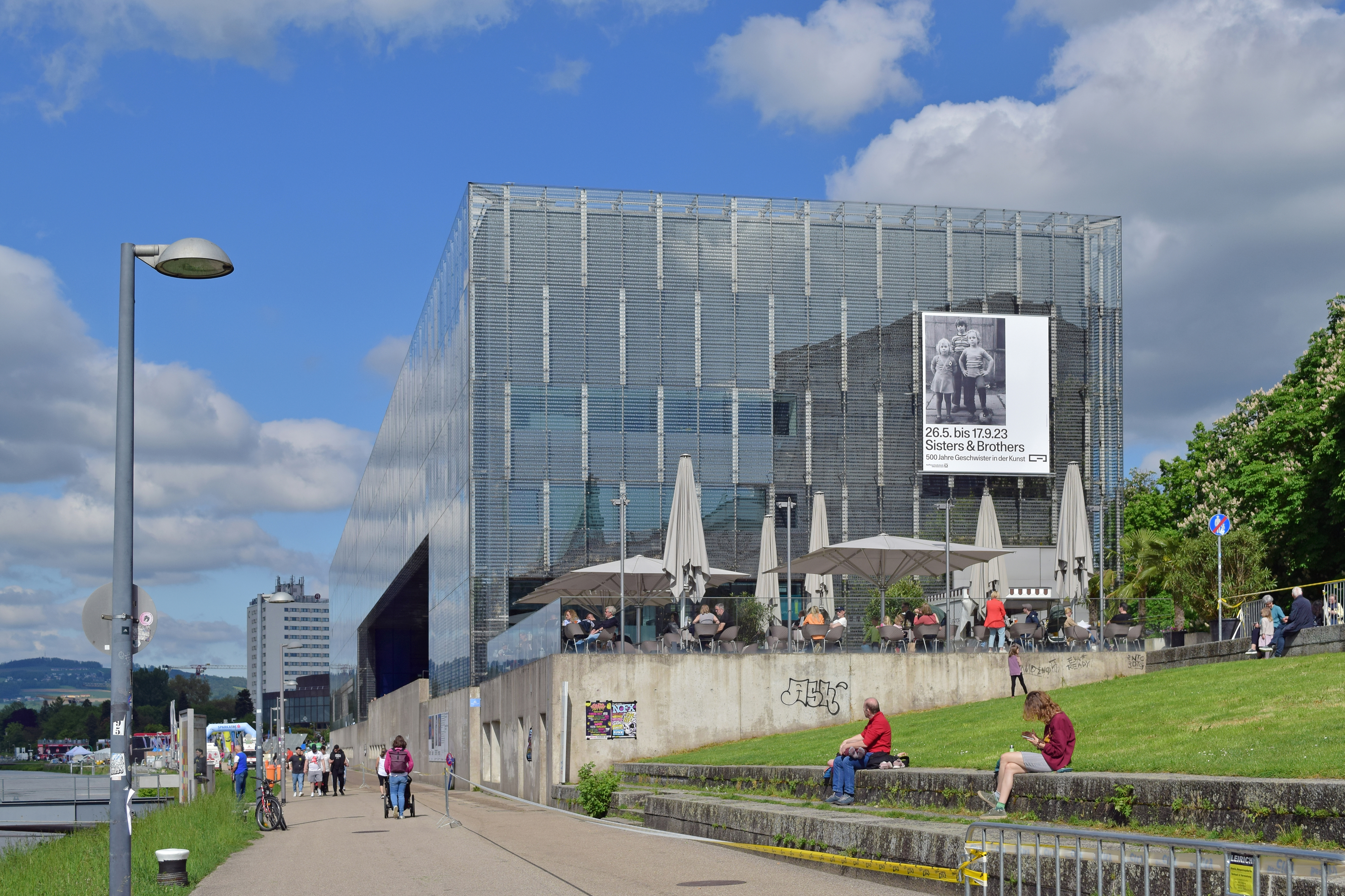
- Lentos Art Museum Linz

- Location within Austria
- Established: May 2003
- Location: Linz, Austria
- Coordinates: 48°18′31″N 14°17′22″E
- Type: Art Museum
- Collections: Modern art
- Architects: Weber & Hofer
- Website: www.lentos.at

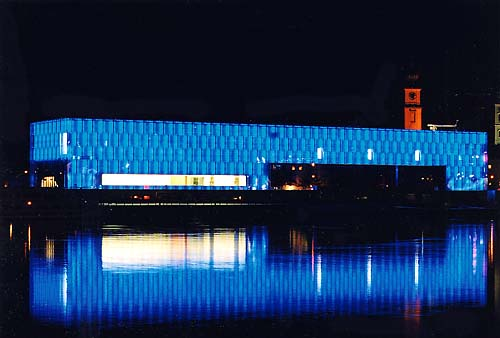
Lentos at night

The Lentos Art Museum (German: Kunstmuseum Lentos) is a museum of modern art in Linz, Austria, which opened in May 2003 as the successor to the Neue Galerie der Stadt Linz (New Gallery of the City of Linz).

The museum was designed by Zurich-based architectural firm Weber & Hofer. It is 130 m (430 ft) long and has approximately 8,000 m^{2} (86,000 sq ft) of floor space. The building's transparent glass façade is illuminated at night. It is located directly on the Danube between the Nibelungen Bridge and Brucknerhaus.

== History ==
One hundred twenty important art works from the collection of the Berlin art dealer Wolfgang Gurlitt (1888–1965), including paintings and graphic works by Klimt, Schiele, Kokoschka, Nolde, Corinth and Pechstein, became the foundation of the collection of the New Gallery of the City of Linz after World War II. Adding to these holdings, in 1953, Linz made the New Gallery a city museum with an active exhibition and acquisition programs. In 1998, the decision was made to build the Lentos Museum, which opened in May 2003. The museum presents significant themes and issues of contemporary art by displaying works of various schools of modern art from the Lentos collection and by exhibiting works of 20th century art on loan from other museums.

== The collection ==
The presentation of the collection is underpinned by the desire to restore the chronological sequence of creative works that are part of an important movement or style. The starting point is the 19th century. On display are works by Gustav Klimt, Gabriele Muenter, Valie Export, and Herbert Bayer.

The museum collection includes around 1,500 works from the areas of painting, sculpture and object art, over 10,000 works on paper, and about 850 photographs, including significant contributions to the development of artistic photography by Alexander Rodtschenko and Man Ray. The earliest works among the museum's holdings are from the first half of the 19th century including Caspar David Friedrich and Johann Baptist Reiter. From the area of classical modernism the Lentos collection includes important paintings by Egon Schiele, Kokoschka, Corinth, and Max Pechstein.

The collection also covers the inter-war period with works from German and Austrian Expressionism and New Objectivity (Neue Sachlichkeit). The period after 1945 is exemplified with works and ensembles of international art, including paintings, sculptures and graphic works by Karel Appel, Ernst Wilhelm Nay, Andy Warhol, Keith Haring, Maria Lassnig, Markus Lüpertz, Arnulf Rainer, Eduardo Chillida, Tony Cragg, Gottfried Helnwein, Sean Scully, Anthony Caro, Elke Krystufek, and Ludwig Merwart.

== Internationality of the sculpture collection ==
The sculpture collection holdings are continuously expanded through active acquisition policies. Since May 2004 the Viennese curator, critic and journalist Stella Rollig has been the director of the Lentos Art museum. In addition to the existing collection, modern art and the most current trends in contemporary art are presented in changing exhibitions.

== Nazi-looted art and provenance research ==
For the Lentos Museum of Art the legacy of the Gurlitt Collection is "as brilliant as it is problematic". Wolfgang Gurlitt, a close contact of the director of the Hitler Führermuseum, Hermann Voss, was investigated for Nazi art looting in 1946, along with other members of the Gurlitt family. Wolfgang Gurlitt's art collection, which the museum purchased in, included artworks that had been looted by Nazis from Jewish collectors. The museum undertook provenance research to establish the origins and ownership history of the collection and the city of Linz created a dedicated provenance working group in 2007. As of 2019, 64 works of art had been investigated, of which 13 paintings were found to have looted art. Artworks restituted to the families of the Jewish collectors plundered by the Nazis include:

- 1999: Lesser Ury, Die Näherin [The seamstress] (Inv. no. 138)
- 2003: Egon Schiele, Stadt am Fluss [Town on the river] (Inv. no. 13) restituted to the heirs of Daisy Hellmann
- 2009: Gustav Klimt, Damenbildnis [Portrait of a lady] (Inv. no. 149) restituted to the heirs of Aranka Munk
- 2011: Wilhelm Trübner, Bildnis Carl Schuh [Portrait of Carl Schuh] (Inv. no. 104) Settlement with the heirs of Harry Fuld
- 2012: 6 paintings by Anton Romako: Mädchen mit aufgestütztem Arm (Tochter des Künstlers), 1875, Inv. no. 10; Der Zweikampf (Kämpfende Ritter), Inv. no. 81; Zigeunerlager, Inv. no. 83; Mädchen mit Früchten, um 1875, Inv. no. 103; Ungarische Puszta (Strohschober in Bálványos), about1880, Inv. no. 104; Bildnis Karl Schwach, 1854, Inv. no. 145 restituted to the heirs of Oskar und Malvine Reichel (on loan to the Lentos)
- 2015: Lovis Corinth, Othello, 1894, (Inv. Nr. 23) and Lovis Corinth, Schwabing (Blick aus dem Atelierfenster), 1891, (Inv. Nr. 24) restituted to the heirs of Jean and Ida Baer
- 2015: Emil Nolde, Maiwiese (Maienwiese) [Meadow in May], 1915, (Inv. Nr. 94) restituted to the heirs of Dr. Otto Siegfried Julius

Not all the artworks have been verified yet and provenance research continues.

== Bibliography ==
- Van Uffelen, Chris. Contemporary Museums - Architecture, History, Collections, Braun Publishing, 2010, ISBN 978-3-03768-067-4, pages 146–149.

== See also ==
- Wolfgang Gurlitt
- List of claims for restitution for Nazi-looted art
