= Bashi-bazouk (disambiguation) =

A bashi-bazouk was an irregular soldier of the Ottoman army.

Bashi-bazouk may also refer to:

- Bashi-Bazouk (Jean-Léon Gérôme), an 1869 painting
- "Bashi-Bazouk", a song by Peter Gabriel from the single "Digging in the Dirt"
