= Aranka Munk =

Viennese art collector murdered in the Holocaust (1862–1941)

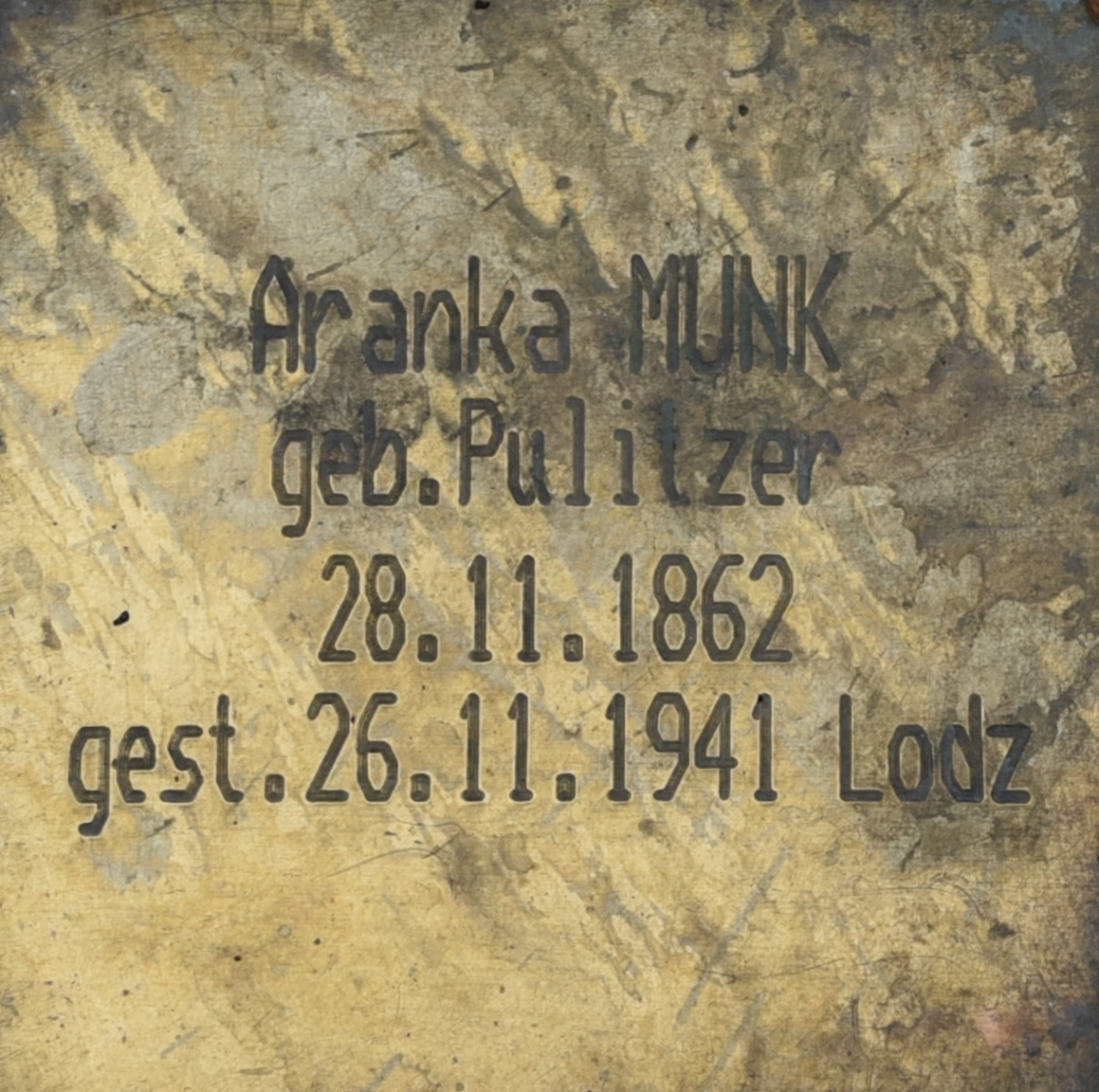
- Memorial stone for Aranka Munk
- Born: Aranka Pulitzer; 28 November 1862; Makó, Hungary, Austria-Hungary
- Died: 26 November 1941 (aged 78); Łódź, occupied Poland
- Occupation: Art collector

Aranka Munk (née Pulitzer; 28 November 1862 – 26 November 1941) was a Hungarian-Jewish art collector active in Vienna. She was killed in the Holocaust.

== Early life and family ==
She was born Aranka Pullitzer in Makó, Austria-Hungary, on 28 November 1862. She was born into a Jewish family, Munk was the daughter of Simon Siegmund Pulitzer and Charlotte Pulitzer and the sister of Klimt's chief patron Serena Lederer and Jenny Steiner. She had three daughters: Lili Munk, Ria Munk and Lola Christine Sachsel-Kraus.

== Death of Ria Munk and Klimt portraits ==
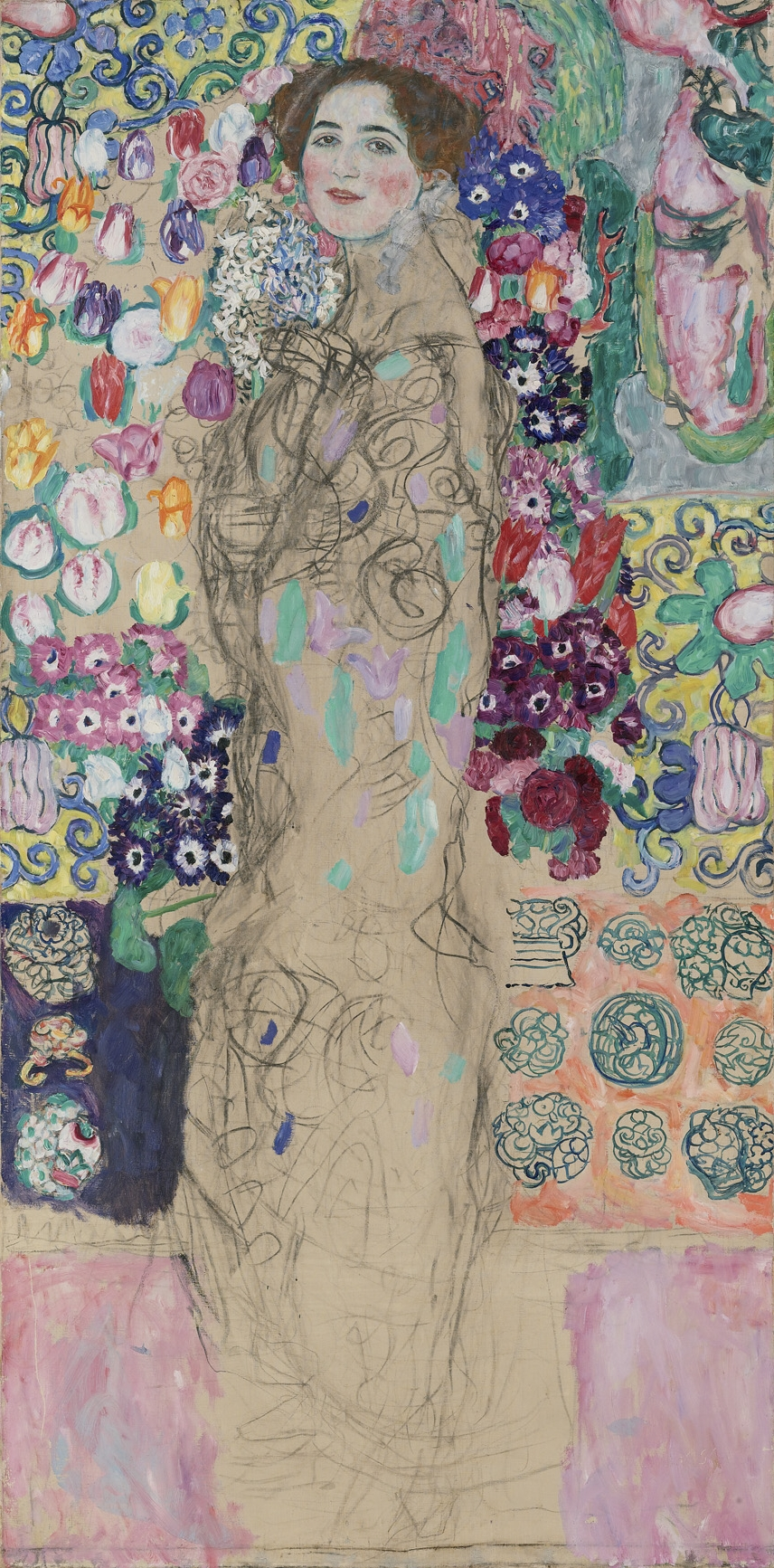
Portrait of Ria Munk III, Gustav Klimt, 1917/1918 (unfinished)

In 1911, Munk's daughter Ria committed suicide. An art collector and patron of the arts, Munk asked Gustav Klimt to paint a death-bed portrait of her daughter. Klimt painted three versions, which each had different fates. The first portrait Klimt painted for Aranka Munk was "Ria Munk on Her Deathbed," which Munk found so upsetting that she gave it to a sculptor friend, whose heirs sold it after the war, passing through the collection of the singer Barbra Streisand.

The second version was later reworked to show a dancer, and the third, which Munk kept, was the unfinished "Portrait of Ria Munk III", also known Frauenbildnis, which ended up in the Lentos Museum's collection. Klimt died before completing it. After Klimt's death Aranka Munk hung the unfinished portrait of her deceased daughter in her lake house.

== Persecution and death ==
In 1941, the Nazis seized her property and possessions and deported her to a concentration camp in Poland. On 26 November 1941, Aranka was murdered in the Holocaust because of her Jewish heritage. In 1942, her daughter Lola Munk died at the Chełmno Extermination Camp.

== Claim for restitution ==
Vienna lawyer Alfred Noll submitted a claim for restitution on behalf of the Munk heirs in 2007. Portrait of Ria Munk III passed through German art dealer Wolfgang Gurlitt on its way to the Lentos Art Museum. In June 2009, the portrait was restituted to the heirs of Aranka Munk.

== See also ==
- The Holocaust in Austria
- List of claims for restitution for Nazi-looted art
