= Wolfgang Gurlitt =

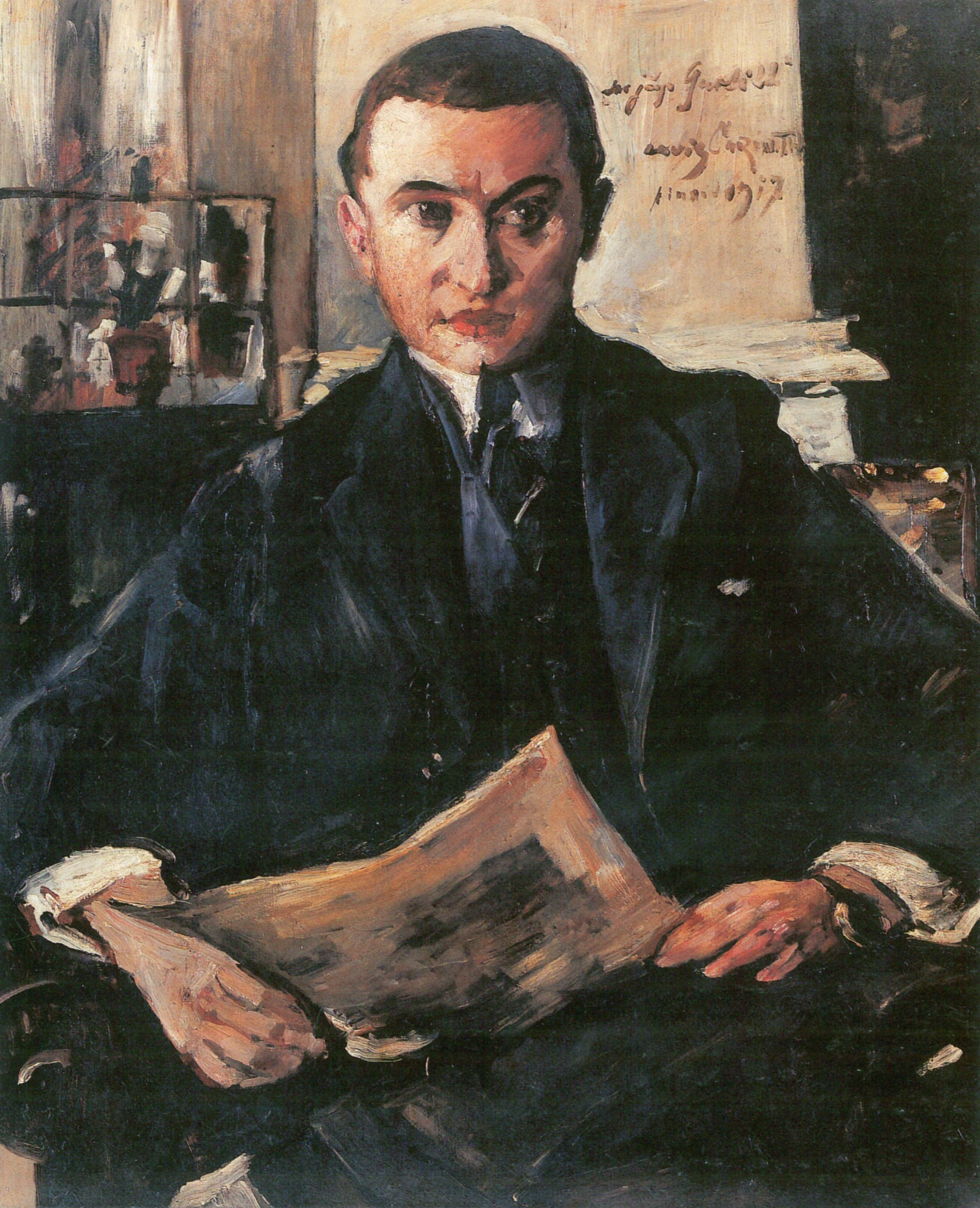
Wolfgang Gurlitt; portrait by Lovis Corinth

Wolfgang Ludwig Heinrich Carl Gurlitt (15 February 1888 – 26 March 1965) was a German art dealer, museum director and publisher whose art collection included Nazi-looted art.

== Family and friends ==
He was grandson of the painter Louis Gurlitt, and son of the art dealer Fritz Gurlitt, founder of the Fritz Gurlitt Gallery, which he had taken over in 1907 and reopened after First World War, and cousin to the Nazi's art dealer Hildebrand Gurlitt. At the same time he worked as a publisher. A friend of Alfred Kubin and Oskar Kokoschka, he was one of the first gallery owners in Germany to exhibit the work of artists such as Lovis Corinth, Leon Dabo, Henri Matisse and Max Slevogt. Already in the early years of the business he ran into financial difficulties and had to take out loans several times. He was known to have "unsound business practices". In 1925 he was unable to repay debts of 50,000 dollars and had instead to hand over artworks which had been offered as collateral for the loans. In 1932 he filed for bankruptcy. Although many customers had lost money and he was unable to pay his debts, in particular his tax liabilities, he continued to work in the art business.

The Berlin Regional Director of the Reich Chamber of Visual Arts, Artur Schmidt, successfully intervened several times on Gurlitt's behalf and reduced the amount demanded by the creditors, while Gurlitt ran his affairs in the name of his divorced first wife Julia. He also managed to conceal his partial Jewish descent until 1938, while other members of his family had already had to emigrate. In 1940 however the Gestapo were charged with an investigation of his case. In particular his Jewish lover and business partner Lilly Agoston, as well as his earlier business connections, aroused the distrust of the Nazis.

== Matisse Exhibition, 1914 ==
In July 1914, Henri Matisse had an exhibition at the Gurlitt gallery, for which Michael and Sarah Stein, Americans living in Paris and brother and sister-in-law of Gertrude Stein, had lent nineteen paintings from their collection. (Flam, 1995, pp. 229). The pictures were lost in the first days of World War I "and subsequently confiscated, or threatened with confiscation", but "they survived intact [even though they] never returned to Paris, resurfacing after complex and protracted negotiations in private hands in Copenhagen (where [many] can be seen today in the Statens Museum for Kunst)." (Spurling, 2003).

== The Nazi Era ==
Wolfgang Gurlitt, cousin of Hitler's art dealer Hildebrand Gurlitt, was a close contact of the director of the Hitler Führermuseum, Hermann Voss. Wolfgang was investigated for Nazi art looting in 1946, along with other members of the Gurlitt family. Provenance research undertaken by the Lentos Art Museum has established conclusively that numerous artworks from Wolfgang Gurlitt's art collection, which he sold to the museum, had been looted by Nazis from Jewish collectors. The museum undertook provenance research to establish the origins and ownership history of the collection and the city of Linz created a dedicated provenance working group in 2007. As of 2019, 64 works of art had been investigated, of which 13 paintings were found to have been looted art. Artworks from Wolfgang Gurlitt's collection restituted to the families of the Jewish collectors plundered by the Nazis include:

- 1999: Lesser Ury, Die Näherin [The seamstress] (Inv. no. 138)
- 2003: Egon Schiele, Stadt am Fluss [Town on the river] (Inv. no. 13) restituted to the heirs of Daisy Hellmann
- 2009: Gustav Klimt, Damenbildnis [Portrait of a lady] (Inv. no. 149) restituted to the heirs of Aranka Munk
- 2011: Wilhelm Trübner, Bildnis Carl Schuh [Portrait of Carl Schuh] (Inv. no. 104) Settlement with the heirs of Harry Fuld
- 2012: 6 paintings by Anton Romako: Mädchen mit aufgestütztem Arm (Tochter des Künstlers), 1875, Inv. no. 10; Der Zweikampf (Kämpfende Ritter), Inv. no. 81; Zigeunerlager, Inv. no. 83; Mädchen mit Früchten, um 1875, Inv. no. 103; Ungarische Puszta (Strohschober in Bálványos), about1880, Inv. no. 104; Bildnis Karl Schwach, 1854, Inv. no. 145 restituted to the heirs of Oskar und Malvine Reichel (on loan to the Lentos)
- 2015: Lovis Corinth, Othello (Der Mohr), 1894, (Inv. Nr. 23) and Lovis Corinth, Schwabing (Blick aus dem Atelierfenster), 1891, (Inv. Nr. 24) restituted to the heirs of Jean and Ida Baer
- 2015: Emil Nolde, Maiwiese (Maienwiese) [Meadow in May], 1915, (Inv. Nr. 94) restituted to the heirs of Dr. Otto Siegfried Julius

== The Postwar Era ==
After the Second World War Wolfgang Gurlitt remained in Austria - possibly to avoid his past catching up with him. In 1946 he was involved already in negotiations about a gallery of modern art in Linz. A majority of the exhibits were to originate from Gurlitt's collection, with artistic direction being entrusted to Gurlitt himself. There was a provisional opening in 1947, with the actual opening taking place in 1948.

Gurlitt organised exciting exhibitions; first he presented the work of Kubins, and following this a Kokoschka exhibition. In 1952 there was a notable exhibition of graphic art under the motto "No More War!".

Gurlitt also profited in Austria from his skilful dealings with the occupying powers. Already in 1946 he changed citizenship. He received travel and transportation facilities as well as rapid access to his bank accounts which had at first been closed.

Despite numerous conflicts with the trustees of the museum Gurlitt was by January 1956 director of the new gallery in Linz. Again the outcome was major financial difficulties. This may have been the primary reason that the greater part of the Gurlitt collection was transferred in 1953 to the city of Linz. However, the provenance of many of the works was uncertain, which made them worth less in the negotiations. Further discrepancies - Gurlitt did not separate his interests as collection director and art dealer clearly enough - finally led to him being asked to resign and his name being removed from the Gallery name (at that time, New Gallery of the City of Linz, Wolfgang Gurlitt Museum). Three years later however he went to court to have the old name restored.

The composer Manfred Gurlitt was his stepbrother, and was a cousin of the musicologist Wilibald Gurlitt.

== See also ==
- Lentos Art Museum
- List of claims for restitution for Nazi-looted art
- Hermann Voss

== Secondary sources ==
- Flam, Jack, ed., Matisse on Art, Revised edition (Documents of Twentieth-Century Art) University of California Press; Revised edition (July 24, 1995). ISBN 0-520-20032-2. ISBN 978-0-520-20032-6.
- Spurling, Hillary, "Two for the road: the prolonged and productive rivalry between Matisse and Picasso fills a major chapter in the history of 20th-century modernism," Art in America (Feb. 2003).
- The other Gurlitt: the dealer cherished by 'degenerate' artists and Nazis alike, by Flavia Foradini, The Art Newspaper, January 2015
