= Siegfried Bendixen =

German painter and graphic artist

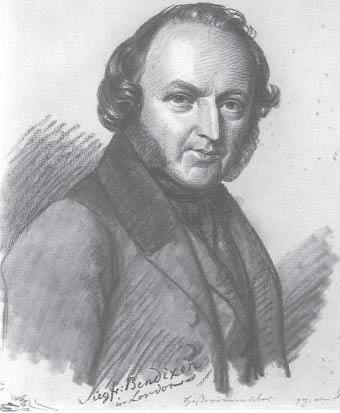
Siegfried Bendixen; portrait by Rudolph Suhrlandt (c.1832)

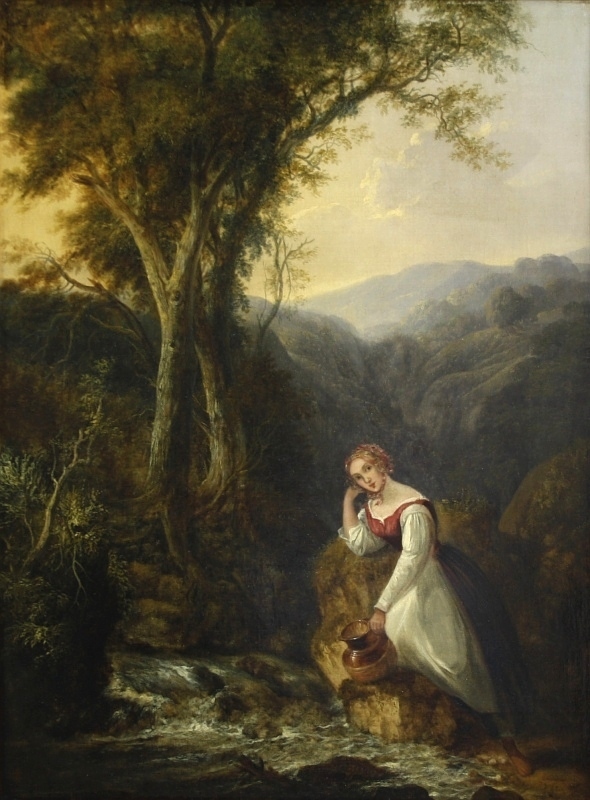
A Young Woman at the Spring (1836)

Siegfried Detlev Bendixen (25 November 1786 – 1864) was a German painter and graphic artist.

== Biography ==
He was born in Kiel. He received his first art lessons as an assistant to the fresco painter, Giuseppe Anselmo Pellicia. After further training in Kiel and Hamburg, he attended the Dresden Academy of Fine Arts (1809), followed by a year at the Academy of Fine Arts, Munich, where he studied history painting. Thanks to the financial support of Count Friedrich Karl von Reventlow, he was able to study in Paris, where he worked with Jacques-Louis David until 1812.

In 1813, he returned to Hamburg and settled there. On the recommendation of the jurist, Friedrich Johann Lorenz Meyer, he worked as a teacher at the "Patriotische Gesellschaft. Later, he became a portrait artist; in oils as well as lithographs. In the mid-1820s, together with other local artists, he was part of a non-profit "academy" of the arts that offered two courses; one for young, beginning artists, and one for oil painting, that included working with nude models. His well-known students included Christian Morgenstern, Henri Lehmann, Louis Gurlitt, and Victor Emil Janssen.

During that same period, he came into possession of a large collection of paintings and drawings which he sold, over time, to support his other activities. In the late 1820s, he performed numerous commissions for religious art and church decorations.

In 1832, for reasons unknown, he moved to London. He continued to work as a portrait painter, but little is known of him after that point. A street in Hamburg's Barmbek district has been named after him. In 2019, his works were part of an exhibit, "Hamburger Schule – Das 19. Jahrhundert neu entdeckt", at the Hamburger Kunsthalle.

== Sources ==
- Ulrich Schulte-Wülwer, "Siegfried Bendixen", in : Kieler Künstler – Kunstleben und Künstlereisen 1770–1870, Heide 2014, pp. 110–149 ISBN 978-3-8042-1406-4
- Nina Struckmeyer: "Bendixen, Siegfried Detlev", In: Bénédicte Savoy, France Nerlich (Eds.): Pariser Lehrjahre. Ein Lexikon zur Ausbildung deutscher Maler in der französischen Hauptstadt. Vol.1: "1793–1843", Berlin / Boston 2013, pp. 20–22 ISBN 978-3-11-029064-6 (Online)
- Ulrich Schulte-Wülwer, Sehnsucht nach Arkadien: Schleswig-Holsteinische Künstler in Italien, Heide 2009, Siegfried Bendixen, pp. 44–48-49
- Ralf Busch (Ed.): Hamburg Altstadt. Führer zu archäologischen Denkmälern in Deutschland. Vol.41. Theiss, Stuttgart 2002. ISBN 3-8062-1658-4
- Andrea Pintsch: "Bendixen, Siegfried Detlev", In: Allgemeines Künstlerlexikon. Vol. 8. Saur, München 1994, pg.629, ISBN 3-598-22748-5
