= Ludwig Merwart =

Austrian painter and graphic artist (1913–1979)

- Born: 1 September 1913; Vienna, Austria-Hungary
- Died: 13 July 1979 (aged 65); Vienna, Austria
- Education: Academy of Fine Arts Vienna
- Known for: Painting, printmaking
- Movement: Tachism

Ludwig Merwart (1 September 1913 – 13 July 1979) was an influential Austrian painter and graphic artist. He is an important representative of Tachism and was a major force in graphic arts and prints, especially after World War II. His work belongs to the most significant and interesting contributions to graphic arts in Austria to this day.

Merwart's unique technique of iron etching attracted great attention in the 50s and 60s and 70s. In 1959 he exhibited his work at the documenta 2 in Kassel (Germany) and at the V. Biennale de São Paulo (Brasil), the following year at the International Graphic Biennale in Cincinnati (Ohio) and the Tate Gallery in London (Great Britain).

“These prints rung from iron, acid, and color, and they radiate tranquility and creativity. The adventure of a method reaching back to the very roots and origins of the creative impulse have captured a phenomenon, which independent of the process of realization, afford the viewer an experience of pronounced aesthetic intensity.” (Dr. Wilhelm Mrazek, Former Director of the Austrian Museum of Applied Arts in Vienna, Austria)

== Exhibitions ==
(sample of recent years)

- 2006: SPEKTRUM FARBE. Kunst der Moderne. Niederösterreichisches Landesmuseum, Sankt Pölten / Austria
- 2003: Avantgarde und Tradition. Lentos Kunstmuseum Linz / Austria
- 2003: Wasser in Attersee. Gemälde, Graphik, Photographie. Kunsthalle Attersee, KATT, Attersee / Austria
- 2003: Ludwig Merwart - Ölbilder und Eisenätzungen. Galerie Wolfgang Exner, - Galerie für junge und aktuelle Kunst, Wien / Austria
- 1999: Zeitschnitt 1900 - 2000 - 100 Jahre, 100 Werke. Neue Galerie der Stadt Linz / Austria

Solo exhibitions

- 1958 Franzoesischer Saal des Kuenstlerhauses Vienna (A)
- 1960 Galerie Ambiente São Paulo (BR)
- 1960 Galerie Parnass Wuppertal-Elberfeld (D)
- 1960 Galerie das Fenster Frankfurt am Main (D)
- 1960 Galerie Bernd Classing Muenster in Westfalen (D)
- 1960 Galerie Willi Verkauf Vienna (A)
- 1961 Galerie Bruecke Bielefeld (D)
- 1962 Galerie Neutorgasse of the Erste österreichische Spar-Casse, Vienna (A)
- 1964 Internationaler Kuenstlerklub Palais Palffy Vienna (A)
- 1968 Galerie Musarion Basel (CH)
- 1969 Galerie auf der Stubenbastei Vienna (A)
- 1970 Galerie an der Stadtmauer Villach (A)
- 1971 Galerie in der Passage Vienna (A)
- 1971 Modern Art Galerie Vienna (A)
- 1972 Galeria Linea 70 Verona (O)
- 1974 Galerie am Schottenring Vienna (A)
- 1977 Hunyadi-Schloss, Maria-Enzersdorf (A)
- 1977 Wella Gallerie Linz (A)
- 1978 Kuenstlerhaus Vienna(A)
- 1982 NOE. Landesmuseum Vienna (A)
- 1982 Neue Galerie der Stadt Linz Wolfgang Gurlitt-Museum (A)

Group exhibitions

- 1948 Künstlerhaus Wien, Junge Künstler Österreichs (A)
- 1958 Kupferstichkabinett der Akademie der bildenden Künste Vienna (A)
- 1958 Jovenes pintores die Viena in San Salvador (ES)
- 1959 II. documenta Kassel (D)
- 1959 Neue Galerie der Stadt Linz (A), Form und Farbe
- 1959 Graphik der Gegenwart, Berlin-Charlottenburg (D)
- 1959 Graphik der Gegenwart, Wiesbaden (D)
- 1959 V. Biennale de São Paulo (BR)
- 1960 International Graphic Biennale Cincinnati (USA)
- 1960 Austrian Art in the Tate-Gallery London (GB)
- 1961 Galerie OREZ, Den Haag (NL)
- 1961 Who is who Wiener Secession Wien (A)
- 1961 Triennale für Original-Farbgraphik Grenchen (CH)
- 1961 Wiener Kunst der Gegenwart, Schloß Porcia Spittal/Drau (A)
- 1961 Internationale Graphikbiennale, Cincinnati (USA)
- 1962 Int. Prints, Art Museum Cincinnati (USA)
- 1962 Graphik in Österreich, Ljubljana (früheres YU)
- 1963 Incisori Austriaci Contemporanei, Calcografia Nazionale, Rome und Pisa (I)
- 1963 Arte contemporaneo des Austrie, Horario Bogota (CO)
- 1966 Galerie Willi Verkauf, Vienna (A)
- 1968 Austrian Cultural Institute, New York (USA)
- 1968 Profile VIII Bochum (D)
- 1969 Galleria Grafica, Romero Rom (I)
- 1969 Galleria Poliantea Terni (I)
- 1969 Galleria d`Arte di San Carlo, Neapel (I)
- 1969 3 a Biennale di Bolzano (I)
- 1969 3 a Rassegna Internazionale d`Arte Acireale, Sizilien (I)
- 1969 Young Artists from Around the World, New York (USA)
- 1969 Art Center, Parkersburg (SA)
- 1969 Oglebay Institute in Wheeling (USA)
- 1969 Art Center der Ersten österreichischen Sparkasse, Wien (A)
- 1970 Incontro Sud, Reggio Calabria (I)
- 1970 Xle Salon International "Paris Sud" (F)
- 1970 Kontra-Art, Hollabrunn (A)
- 1970 Avantgarde 70, Klosterneuburg (A)
- 1970 University of Texas, Austin (USA)
- 1970 Kleine Galerie, Vienna (A)
- 1970 Panorama 70/71, Galerie bei Infeld, Kitzbühel (A)
- 1971 Kontra-Art, Hollabrunn (A)
- 1972 Galerie Döbling, Vienna (A)
- 1972 13. Graphikwettbewerb, Landesmuseum Ferdinandeum Innsbruck (A)
- 1972 Parz-Kontakte 72, Künstlerzentrum, Schloß Parz (A)
- 1972 2. Meeting, Wolfgangsee, St. Wolfgang (A)
- 1973 Österreichischer Graphikwettbewerb, Krems (A)
- 1973 Austrian Cultural Institute, New York (USA)
- 1973 Umweltgalerie, Stuttgart (D)
- 1974 Parzer Kontakte 74, Schloß Parz (A)
- 1974 Düsseldorfer Kunstmarkt (D)
- 1975 La jeune gravure contemporaine, Paris (F)
- 1975 Galerie Contact, Vienna (A)
- 1975 Galerie Candea, Kettwig (D)
- 1975 Düsseldorfer Kunstmarkt (D)
