= Jenny Steiner =

Austro-Hungarian art collector, patron of the arts and factory owner

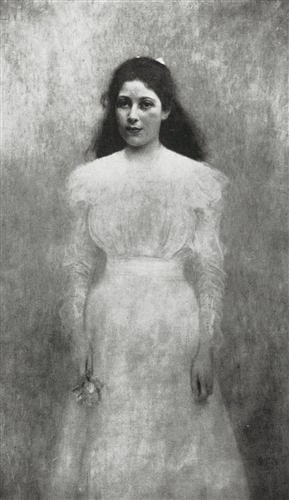
Gustav Klimt, Portrait of Trude Steiner

Jenny Steiner (born July 11, 1863, in Budapest, Austria-Hungary, as Eugenie Pulitzer; died March 2, 1958, in New York) was an Austro-Hungarian art collector, patron of the arts, and factory owner expropriated under the Nazis.

== Life ==
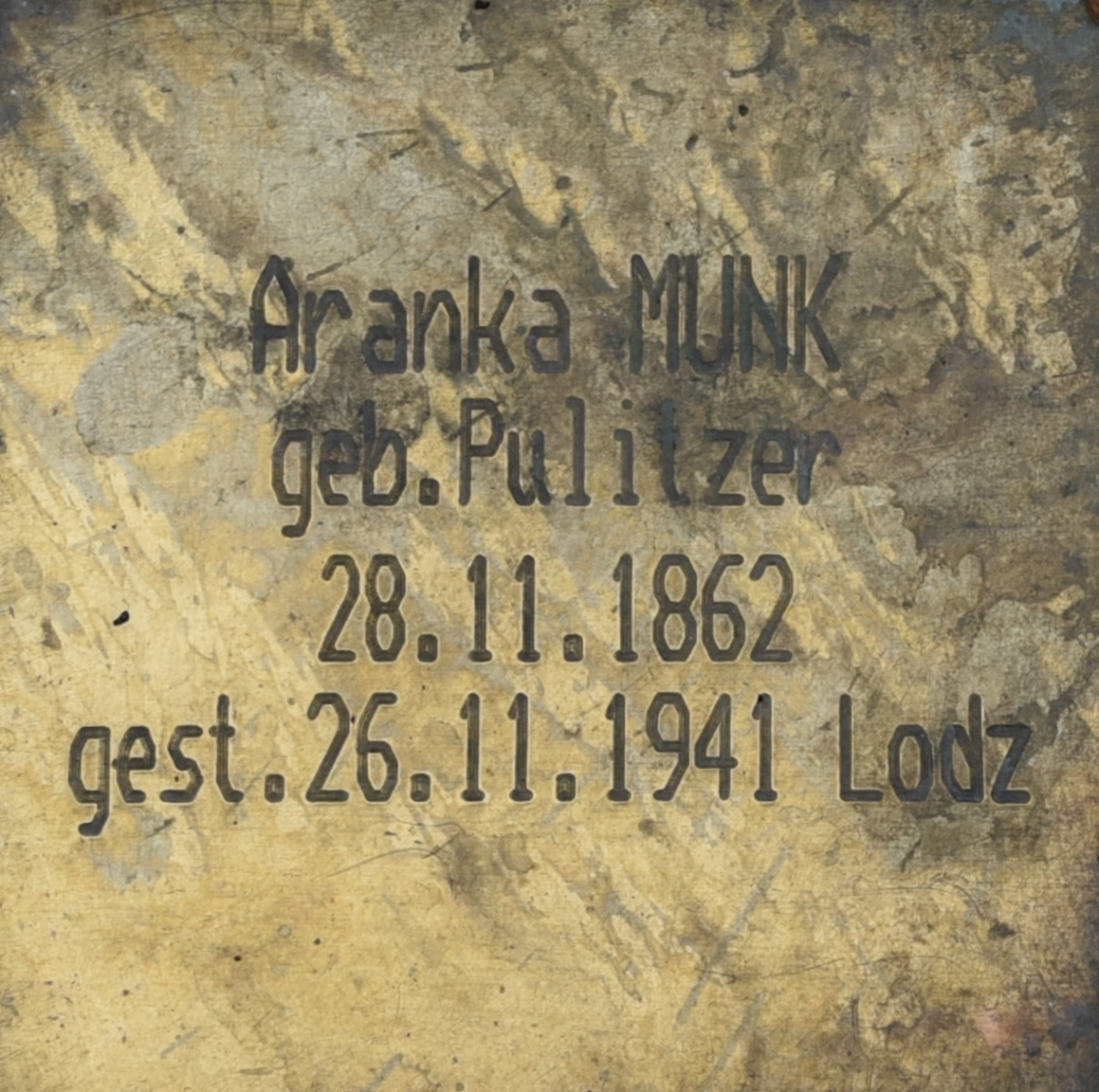
Aranka Munk

Jenny Steiner, née Politzer or Pulitzer, was born in Budapest, the daughter of Siegmund Pulitzer and his wife Charlotte (1833-1920), into a wealthy Jewish family of factory owners. Her sister was the Klimt supporter and confidante Serena (Sidonie), (married name Lederer); her great-uncle was Joseph Pulitzer, the American publisher and founder of the Pulitzer Prize. Her sister Aranka, (married name Munk), was murdered with her daughter Lola in the Litzmannstadt ghetto during the Holocaust.

Jenny Steiner married the Viennese manufacturer Wilhelm Steiner, co-owner of the silk manufacturer Gebrüder Steiner. After the death of her husband in 1922, she continued to run the company alone with the support of her nephew Albert Steiner.

Jenny Steiner had five children with Wilhelm Steiner, four daughters and one son. The eldest daughter, Gertrude (Trude, * 1887), died of meningitis in 1900. Gustav Klimt painted a posthumous portrait of her in 1900, Portrait of Trude Steiner, which was looted by the Nazis. Daisy was born in 1890; she had been married to Wilhelm Hellmann since 1912, with whom she had a large art collection of medieval art, old masters, contemporary paintings and more. Klara, born in 1901, was married twice and lived in the household of Jenny Steiner in Zedlitzgasse in Vienna until 1938. Anna, Klara's twin sister, was married three times. She had a daughter, Susanne, from her marriage to Paul Weiß. She also lived in Vienna until 1938. Jenny's son Georg died in 1926 at the age of 31.

Jenny Steiner's sisters Serena and Aranka had large collections of works by Gustav Klimt; Serena herself, her mother Charlotte and her daughter Elisabeth Bachofen-Echt were portrayed by Klimt. All three sisters, but especially Serena, had close relationships with Gustav Klimt; they were also patrons of Egon Schiele. Serena's son Erich had drawing lessons with Schiele. All the sisters owned paintings by Klimt and Schiele.

== Nazi era ==
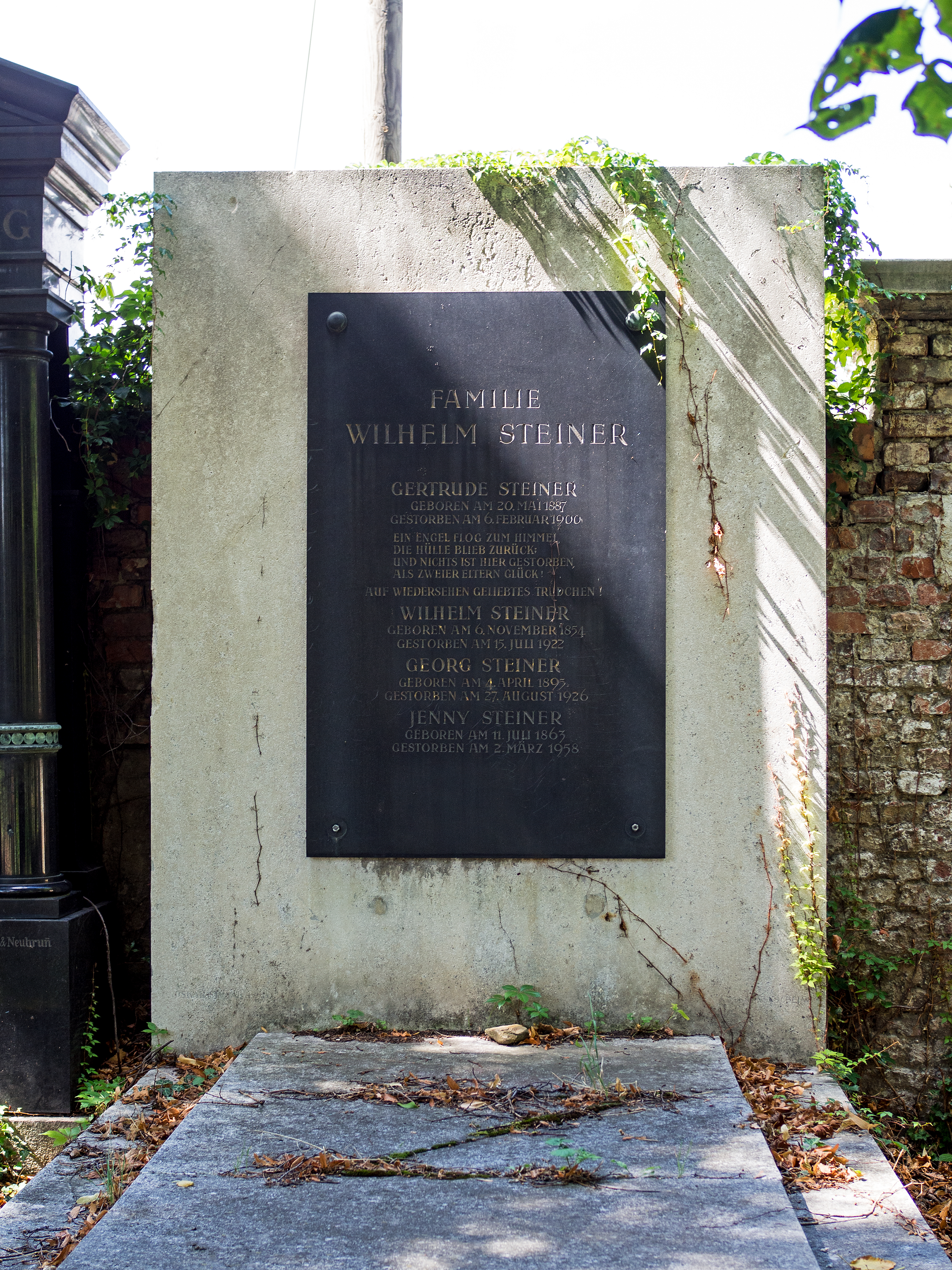
Jenny Steiner's grave in the Old Jewish Section of the Vienna Central Cemetery

After Austria merged with Nazi Germany in the Anschluss of 1938, Steiner and her family were persecuted due to their Jewish heritage. In 1938, Jenny Steiner fled with her daughters Daisy Hellmann and her husband and Anna Weinberg and a granddaughter to Paris, from there to Portugal and then to Brazil. With the help of an affidavit from Josef Pulitzer, a cousin of Jenny's father, they made it to the USA. Her daughter Klara and her husband also managed to flee to the USA via Paris.

In addition to carpets and wall reliefs, furniture and paintings were confiscated and seized under the pretext of Reich flight tax debt. Her art collection was auctioned off at the Dorotheum auction house in Vienna starting in 1940.

== Postwar ==
Jenny Steiner died in New York in 1958; her grave is in the Old Jewish Section of the Vienna Central Cemetery (Gate 1, Group 7, Row 30, No. 134).

== Commemoration ==
Jenny-Steiner-Weg in Vienna-Neubau was named after her in 2009.

== Restitution ==
Austria made restitution to Jews difficult for many decades, and even restituted objects deemed of cultural significance were often subject to an export ban which meant that the surviving family had no way to bring the artworks out of Austria. It was not until the Art Restitution Act of 1998 and its amendment of 2009 that some of the looted works were finally returned to their rightful owners. Restitution was slow and numerous works are still missing, including the work Portrait of Trude Steiner by Gustav Klimt. Its whereabouts have been unknown since 1941. The painting by Egon Schiele Häuser am Meer located in the Leopold Museum was the object of a settlement in 2012 after a long dispute. The whereabouts of other works are still unknown.

The heirs of Jenny Steiner have registered 62 search requests for lost artworks on the German Lost Art Foundation website for artworks by Klimt, Schiele, Isidor Kaufmann, Rudolf von Alt and many other artists.

== See also ==
- The Holocaust in Austria
- List of claims for restitution for Nazi-looted art
- Vugesta
- Entartete Kunst

== Literature ==
- Sophie Lillie (Hrsg.): Was einmal war. Handbuch der enteigneten Kunstsammlungen Wiens. 2003, ISBN 978-3-7076-0049-0.
- Tobias Natter, Gerbert Frodl (Hrsg.): Klimt und die Frauen. Ausstellungskatalog, Dumont, Köln 2000, ISBN 3-8321-7271-8.
- Leopold-Museum-Privatstiftung: Dossier Jenny Steiner, erstellt von Sonja Niederacher am 21. Dezember 2009.
- Sophie Lillie: Die Sammlung Jenny Steiner. In: Kunst – Kommunikation – Macht. Sechster Österreichischer Zeitgeschichtetag, 2003.
