= Daisy Hellmann =

Viennese art patron and collector (1890–1977)

Daisy Hellmann (1890–1977) was a Viennese art patron and collector persecuted by the Nazis because of her Jewish ancestry.

== Early life ==
Daisy Hellmann (née Steiner, born in Vienna on 22 April 1890; died 5 January 1977) was a member of one of the most important families of art patrons in Vienna in the first quarter of the 20th century. Her father was Wilhelm Steiner and her mother Eugenie (Jenny) Steiner (Pulitzer). In her book, Was Einmal War, Sophie Lillie describes the lives of the "assimilated, haut bourgeois Jewry of Austria between the wars, people who without exception were talented, successful members of the community". One of the individuals she describes is Daisy Hellmann.

Daisy married Wilhelm (Willy) Hellmann of Vienna, a textile magnate. The Hellmanns lived at No. 17 Rathausstraße in Vienna’s first district, one of Oskar Strnad’s interior design projects.

Many of their parlor furnishings were designed by the co-founder of the Vienna Workshop, Austrian artist Koloman Moser a "ground breaking graphic designer, ceramicist, silver, jewellery, fashion and not least furniture designer".

== Art collector, Nazi persecution and emigration ==
The artist Egon Schiele was a personal friend of the Hellmanns, who purchased one of his paintings, "Landscape at Krumau" from him soon after it was painted. The work hung in the Hellmann’s apartment until October 1938 when it was seized by the Nazis and put up for sale in Vienna in 1942. The artwork was then acquired by Wolfgang Gurlitt who sold it to the Neue Galerie in Linz in January 1953 where it remained for decades. Other Schieles in their collection included Kleinkind (Baby)

Fleeing the Nazis, Daisy Hellmann arrived in Rio de Janeiro in 1940.

Her mother, Jenny Steiner, owner of a silk factory and a prominent art collector, also fled Vienna, leaving behind her own collection of Schieles including Houses by the Sea (1914) which entered the Leopold collection in 1955. Steiner died in New York in 1958.

== Claims for Restitution ==
In late 2002, after years of wrangling, the City of Linz decided to return the painting 'Krumau, 1916' by Egon Schiele to the heirs of Daisy Hellmann. The fate of the rest of the collection is not known.

The Leopold Museum settled a restitution claim with Jenny Steiner's heirs, including Daisy's daughter, in 2012.

The German Lost Art Foundation lists 29 search requests for artworks formerly in the Wilhelm and Daisy Hellmann collection, meaning that the family is trying to find them.

== See also ==
- The Holocaust in Austria
- Vugesta
- List of claims for restitution for Nazi-looted art
