= Nischwitz =

Nischwitz is a German surname. Notable people with the surname include:

- Andreas Nischwitz (born 1957), West German pair skater
- Margarete Nischwitz (1891–1979), German political activist and politician
- Ron Nischwitz (born 1937), American baseball player and coach
- Theo Nischwitz (1913–1994), German cinematographer and special effects expert

== See also ==
- Nischwitz Stadium, a baseball venue in Dayton, Ohio, United States
