= Fritz Gurlitt =

Art dealer and collector

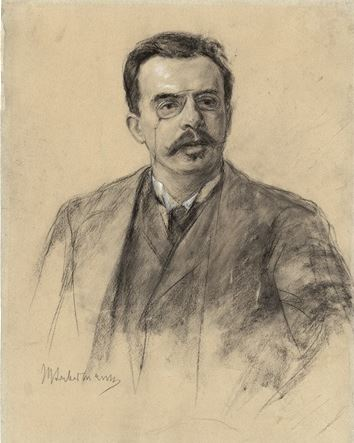
- Portrait by Max Liebermann (1892)
- Born: Friedrich Louis Moritz Anton Gurlitt; 3 October 1854; Vienna, Austro-Hungary
- Died: 8 February 1893 (aged 38); Thonberg (Leipzig), Germany
- Occupations: Art dealer Gallery director
- Spouse: Annarella Imhoff (1858–1935)
- Children: Angelina (1882–1962); Margarete (1885–?); Wolfgang (1888–1965); Manfred (1890–1972)
- Parent(s): Louis Gurlitt 1812–1897; Elisabeth (née Lewald)

Friedrich "Fritz" Gurlitt (3 October 1854 – 8 February 1893), originally from Vienna, was a Berlin based art dealer and collector, specialising, in particular, in contemporary art. After his early death the art gallery he had established in central Berlin was taken on by his son, the dealer Wolfgang Gurlitt (1888–1965).

== Life ==
Friedrich Louis Moritz Anton Gurlitt was born in Vienna. His father, Louis Gurlitt 1812–1897, was a well regarded landscape artist. The Gurlitts were among the leading families in the nineteenth century arts establishment in the German speaking world, which provided Friedrich with a relatively trouble free admission ticket to the arts community. Friedrich's mother, born Elisabeth Lewald, was of Jewish provenance, which became politically significant only many years later, after a government came to power in Germany that was keen to convert visceral racism into a defining underpinning of government policy.

In 1880 he founded the "Fritz Gurlitt Gallery" in Berlin. The gallery was located at Behrenstraße 29 (29 Behren Street), and specialised in contemporary art. Differences have arisen over the correct name of the business, which is identified sometimes as a "gallery" ("Galerie"), sometimes as an "art dealership" ("Kunsthandlung") and sometimes as an "art salon" ("Kunst-Salon"). Artists whom he backed included Arnold Böcklin and Anselm Feuerbach. In 1886, he was mandated to take charge of the "Jubilee Exhibition", described as the "first international art exhibition in Berlin". The well-regarded novelist Theodor Fontane probably owed much of his knowledge of Böcklin to Fritz Gurlitt. Other artists who in large measure owed their reputations to the Gurlitt Gallery include Wilhelm Leibl, Hans Thoma, Max Liebermann, Lesser Ury, Franz Skarbina and Clara Siewert.

Fritz Gurlitt died suddenly on 8 February 1893 as a result of the syphilis from which he suffered. In the immediate term, the Fritz Gurlitt Gallery was relocated to an address in the "Leipzigerstrasse" ("Leipzig Street"), but in other respects continued to operate as before, apparently under the direction of Carl Steinbart, an art collector and banker who had been a friend of Gurlitt's. In 1907, when Wolfgang Gurlitt, the elder son of Fritz, reached the age of 19, he took on the gallery which retained its focus on contemporary art: there are suggestions that Wolfgang was more commercially astute than his father had been. In the end the gallery closed down, during the Second World War, in 1942.

== Family ==
Fritz Gurlitt married Annarella Imhoff (1858–1935) in 1881. Her father was the Swiss sculptor Heinrich Max Imhof, who had by this time lived in Rome, ostensibly on account of his health, for many years. Fritz and Annarella married in Rome. Contemporary sources indicate that the marriage resulted in four recorded children as follows:

- Angelina (1882–1962) who married Sigmund von Weech
- Margarete (1885–?)
- Wolfgang (1888–1965) art dealer
- Manfred (1890–1972) composer, especially of operas, and orchestral conductor

After the Nazis took power people were persuaded to investigate their ancestry and "demonstrate" that none of their four grandparents were Jewish. This was particularly important for anyone with a job in public service and / or a high-profile public position. Manfred Gurlitt had a high profile as an opera conductor whose performances were frequently broadcast on national radio. He joined the Nazi Party on 1 May 1933. On 4 May 1937 his party membership was nullified on account of his Jewish provenance, presumably on account of his paternal grandmother, Elisabeth Lewald/Gurlitt. Information on his Nazi Party connections during the intervening four year is incomplete, but a number of sources from the period indicate that his father was not Fritz Gurlitt but his mother's lover, Willi Waldecker. The idea was not totally preposterous, since Manfred was only 3 when his father died, and his mother did subsequently marry Willi Waldecker. Towards the end of the 1930s Manfred Gurlitt relocated to Japan where he enjoyed a career based in Tokyo as a conductor of western music.
