= Bashi-Bazouk (Jean-Léon Gérôme) =

1869 painting by Jean-Léon Gérôme

- Bachi-Bouzouk (French), Bachi-Bouzouk nègre
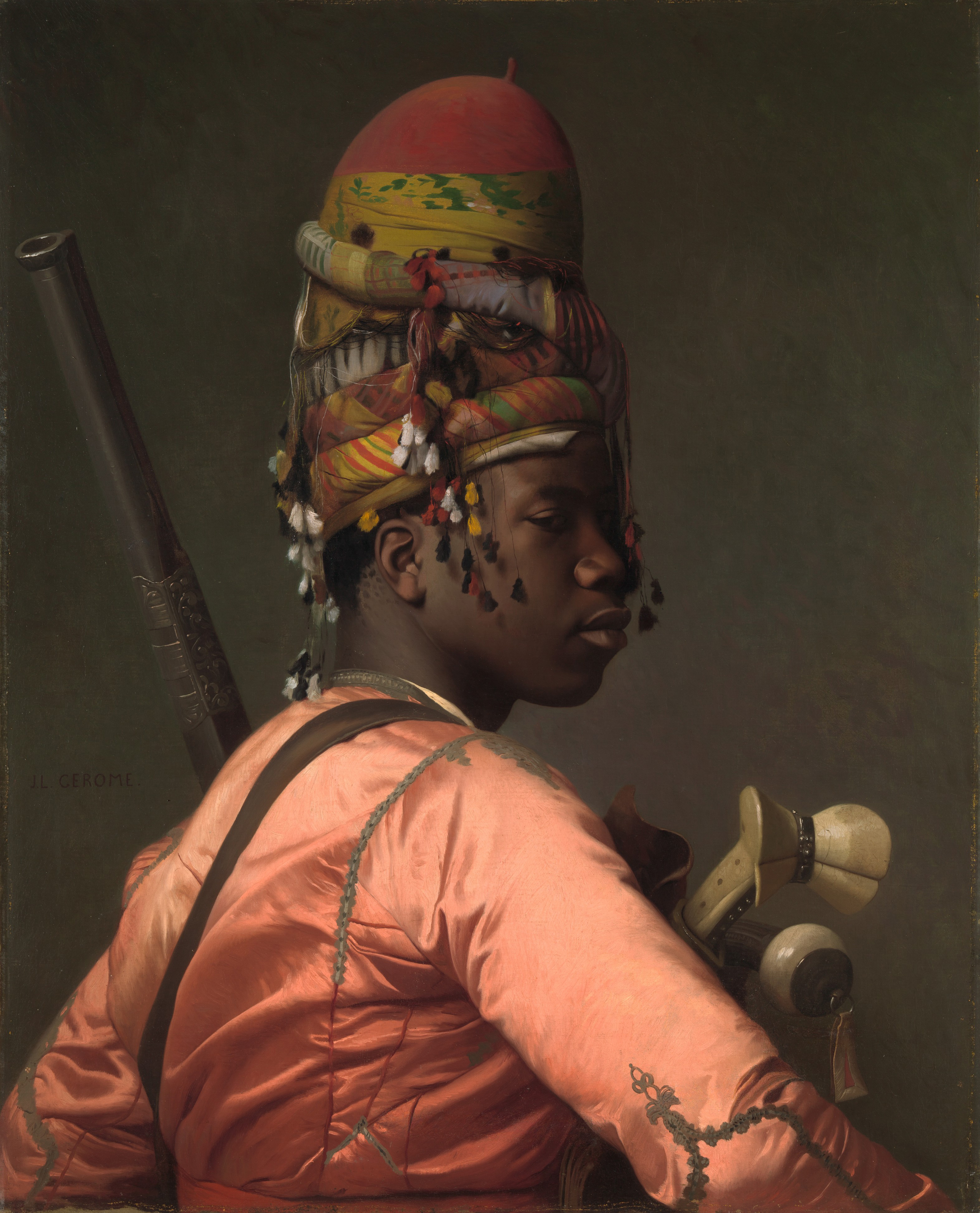
- Artist: Jean-Léon Gérôme
- Year: 1869
- Medium: Oil on canvas
- Dimensions: 80.6 cm × 66 cm (31.7 in × 26 in)
- Location: Metropolitan Museum of Art; New York

Bashi-Bazouk (possibly titled Bachi-Bouzouk nègre) is an oil on canvas painting by French artist Jean-Léon Gérôme, from 1869. It depicts a Bashi-bazouk, who was an irregular soldier of the Ottoman Empire. The painting is on display at the Metropolitan Museum of Art, in New York.

== Description ==
Painted by Jean-Léon Gérôme between 1868 and 1869, the painting depicts a dark-skinned model dressed as a Bashi-bazouk, a levy of irregular Ottoman soldiers infamous for their brutality, looting, and lack of discipline. Gérôme acquired the garb seen in the painting during a trip to the near east in 1868. The haphazard and mixed textiles the model is dressed in is reminiscent of the Bashi-bazouks, as the soldiers were traditionally unpaid and did not adopt a standardized uniform, resulting in the soldiers wearing whatever they could acquire on a march. This a key point of the painting, as the brutal reputation of a Bashi-bazouk is contrasted by the silk tunic, quality clothes, and noble bearing of the subject. The fact that the portraitist is actually a model also adds to the artificiality of the painting.

The Turkish title given to the painting, which can be translated as “bad head,” evokes the fierce, lawless mercenaries whose only pay were the spoils of their pillages. Yet it is difficult to imagine this man dressed in an exquisite silk tunic in that role. Famous for his skill in rendering textures, Gérôme produces one of his finest works here, displaying all his talent and giving the model a dignity absent from his other orientalist fantasies.
