= Cornelius Gurlitt (art historian) =

German architect and art historian (1850–1938)

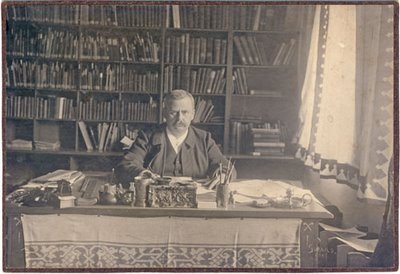
- Gurlitt in 1905
- Born: 1 January 1850; Nischwitz in Thallwitz, Kingdom of Saxony
- Died: 25 March 1938 (aged 88); Dresden, Germany
- Resting place: Johannisfriedhof, Dresden, Germany; 51°2′11.92″N 13°48′47.84″E
- Occupations: Art historian and architect
- Employer: Technische Universität Dresden
- Spouse: Marie Gerlach (1888–1938)
- Children: Wilibald Gurlitt; Hildebrand Gurlitt; Cornelia Gurlitt expressionist painter
- Parents: Louis Gurlitt; Elisabeth Gurlitt
- Relatives: Cornelius Gurlitt (uncle); Fanny Lewald (aunt)

Cornelius Gustav Gurlitt (1 January 1850 – 25 March 1938) was a German architect and art historian.

== Life ==
Gurlitt was born in Nischwitz in Thallwitz, Saxony, the son of the landscape painter Louis Gurlitt and nephew of his namesake, the composer Cornelius Gurlitt. He left the gymnasium of Gotha before graduation and became a carpenter's apprentice. After studying in Stuttgart and Vienna he worked as an architect, then obtained a position at the Dresden Museum of Decorative Arts.

He married Marie Gerlach in 1888. They had three children, the musicologist Wilibald Gurlitt, expressionist painter Cornelia Gurlitt (1890–1919) and the art dealer and historian Hildebrand Gurlitt.

Gurlitt died in Dresden in 1938 and is buried in the Johannisfriedhof.

== Career ==
While an assistant at the Arts and Crafts Museum in Dresden, Gurlitt wrote a pioneering work on baroque art. This led to a doctorate and a professorship at the Dresden University of Technology, where he worked until his emeritat in 1920.

He was co-founder and president of the Bund Deutscher Architekten ("Association of German Architects") and principal of the Technische Universität Dresden, where he was also professor of art history and the history of construction.

He is regarded as the founder of art historical research into the Baroque, and thus as the founder of the conservation of historical monuments in Saxony. He often worked as a consultant with the architects Schilling & Graebner. From 1894 he continued the Saxon inventory work of the art historian Franz Richard Steche.

== Works ==
Gurlitt wrote 97 books and more than 400 scholarly articles, not only on architecture and art, but also on political problems. Some of his works are:

- Beschreibende Darstellung der älteren Bau- und Kunstdenkmäler des Königreichs Sachsen ("Descriptive representation of older architectural and art monuments of the Kingdom of Saxony"), Part 16 (1894) – Part 41 (1923)
- Die Baukunst Konstantinopels ("The architecture of Constantinople"), Berlin: E. Wasmuth (1912). Volume 1, Volume 2
