= Harry Fuld =

German manufacturer and art collector (1879–1932)

Harry Fuld (born 3 February 1879 in Frankfurt am Main; died 26 January 1932 in Zurich) was a German Jewish entrepreneur whose art collection was looted by Nazis after his death. Fuld founded a company for renting in-house telephones, which developed into one of the leading groups in the telecommunications industry in Europe. After Adolf Hitler and the NSDAP came to power at the beginning of 1933, the Nazi regime expropriated Fuld's heirs because the family business was considered "Jewish".

== Life ==
Fuld was the only son of a wealthy Frankfurt art and antiques dealer and was supposed to join the family's own art and antiques shop, J. and S. Goldschmidt. After a bank apprenticeship in Frankfurt and traineeships in London, Paris and Brussels, there was no room for him in the family business. He then began to rent home telephones based on the American model. After clarification of the legal situation, these systems were officially approved from 1900 onwards.

Together with the German master watchmaker and technician Carl Lehner (1871–1969), Fuld founded the German private telephone company H. Fuld & Co. in Frankfurt am Main in 1899. This became H. Fuld & Co. Telephon- und Telegraphenwerke in 1928/1929 AG and after Fuld's death to National Telephon- und Telegraphenwerke GmbH.

Around 1925, a large part of the private telephone systems inside and outside Germany were manufactured and maintained by his company. In 1928, Fuld's rapidly expanding company had developed into a group with over 100 companies and an extensive network of branches. By 1930, Fulds Gesellschaft was one of the leading companies in the European telecommunications industry.

== Nazi persecution ==
Harry Fuld collected modern art and built up an extensive collection. After Fuld's death in 1932, his sons Harry and Peter Harry Fuld and his widow inherited the company and the art collection. When the Nazis came to power in 1933, the Fuld's were persecuted because Jewish. The Fuld children fled Nazi Germany in 1937, and the art collection was confiscated by the Nazis, including the painting Le Mur Rose by Henri Matisse, which Harry Fuld senior had bought in 1917.

=== Le Mur Rose by Matisse ===
Le Mur Rose came into the possession of Nazi SS officer Kurt Gerstein in 1943. Gerstein, who was responsible for transporting the Zyklon B poison used in concentration camp gas chambers, committed suicide in 1948. Gerstein's widow led investigators to a cache of stolen items which included Le Mur Rose. In 1951 the Matisse was moved to a Paris museum along with hundreds of other objects stolen by the Nazis, and ended up at the Centre Pompidou. It was restituted to the heirs of Fuld in 2008.

=== Giovanni di Paolo panels ===
Panels depicting two scenes of the life of St. Clare of Assisi, The Clothing of St. Clare By St. Francis, and St. Clare Rescuing the Shipwrecked, were restituted from Berlin's Gemäldegalerie (Old Master Gallery) to the Fuld heirs.

=== Tintoretto ===
A Tintoretto "Christ carrying the Cross" from the Mayer-Fuld collection was acquired by the Nazi Karl Haberstock from the Achenbach auction house (Berlin) in July 1940 and sold to the Düsseldorf municipal art collections

=== 500 artworks in the Lostart database ===
More than 500 objects from the Mayer-Fuld collection are listed in Germany's lost-art database.

=== Expropriation of the company ===
The Nazis expropriated the telephone company from Fuld's widow, Lucie Mayer-Fuld, and his two sons. Mayer-Fuld fled to France and the sons to England. After an anti-Jewish boycott and "Aryanization", that is, transfer to non-Jews, the company became Telefonbau und Normalzeit GmbH (T & N) in 1937.

== Literature ==
- Leo Parth: Harry Fuld. Eine Lebensskizze. (Privatdruck der Firma H. Fuld & Co., Frankfurt am Main) o. V. (Stalling), o. O. (Oldenburg) o. J. (1933).
- Franz Lerner (1961). "Fuld, Harry Herz Salomon". Neue Deutsche Biographie (in German). Vol. 5. Berlin: Duncker & Humblot. pp. 725–726. (full text online).
- "Ungeheures telefonisches Verkehrsbeduerfnis". Telenorma, vom jungen Harry Fuld als Gesellschaft für Haustelefonanlagen gegründet. In: Frankfurter Allgemeine Zeitung, Nr. 235 vom 10. Oktober 1991, S. 46.
- Caroline Flick: "Raubkunst exemplarisch. Harry Fuld, Hans W. Lange, Kurt Gerstein und Herni Matisses 'Le Mur Rose'". In: Jahrbuch für westfälische Kirchengeschichte, Band 105 (2009), S. 419–486.

== See also ==
- Aryanization
- List of claims for restitution for Nazi-looted art
- History of the Jews in Germany
