= Wilibald Gurlitt =

German musicologist (1889–1963)

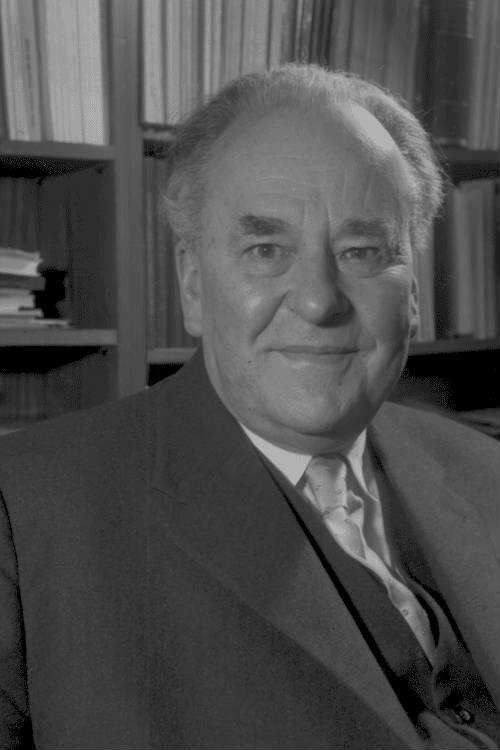
Image of Gurlitt

Wilibald Gurlitt (1 March 1889, Dresden – 15 December 1963, Freiburg) was a German musicologist.

Gurlitt, son of the art historian Cornelius Gurlitt, attended the St. Anne Semi-Classical Secondary School (Annenrealgymnasium) in Dresden and passed his maturity examination (Reifeprüfung) in 1908. He continued his studies at Heidelberg University and the University of Leipzig, predominantly philosophy and the history of civilization at first, but later chiefly music science, in particular the history of music in the 16th and 17th centuries.

He began his practical training in music during his schooling in Dresden as a private student of Erdmann Warwas (violin) and Clemens Braun (theory), continued it in Heidelberg with Professor Philipp Wolfrum (counterpoint) and Karl Hasse (organ), and later on his own. He also received artistic advancement from Professor Karl Straube, organist at the St. Thomas Church, Leipzig.

From 1 April 1909 to 31 March 1910 he served in the 1st (Personal) Grenadier Regiment no. 100 in Dresden, and also attended evening lectures at the University of Technology (Technische Hochschule) there during the winter semester of 1909-1910.

During the summer semester of 1911 he took the graduate assistant position in the Collegium Musicum in Leipzig, in which he arranged and studied obscure music of the 17th century and also played violin.

From April to October 1912, he undertook an extensive study trip in order to gather material for his music history thesis. In 1914 he delivered his inaugural dissertation on Michael Praetorius under Hugo Riemann. Later that year he was wounded near Sompuis on 9 September as Lieutenant of the Reserve in the aforementioned regiment, and was taken captive by the French on 10 September. He was later released, finished his dissertation, and received his philosophical doctorate. In 1919 he became a lecturer in Freiburg, finally becoming professor in 1929. There he founded the musicology department and the Collegium Musicum which met in Karlsruhe and Hamburg for large public performances of medieval music.

As a promoter of the Orgelbewegung (organ movement), he had the so-called 'Praetorius organ' built by master-organ-builder Oskar Walcker, based on 1619 designs by Praetorius. It was destroyed in 1944 in a bombing raid, but a large section of it was rebuilt by Werner Walcker-Mayer in the atrium of a new building at the University in 1955.

Under National Socialism, Gurlitt was labelled a Jewish conspirator, and in 1937 was relieved of his office. He was re-employed after the war. From 1946-8 he was visiting professor at the University of Bern, and from 1955-6 at the University of Basel. In 1953 he was appointed to an honorary doctorate at the University of Leipzig.

== Translations ==
- Autobiography of Wilibald Gurlitt (1914), translated by Nathaniel J. Biebert (Red Brick Parsonage, 2014).
- Michael Praetorius (Creuzbergensis): His Life and His Works, Gurlitt's inaugural dissertation for the University of Leipzig, translated by Nathaniel J. Biebert (Red Brick Parsonage, 2014-). NOTE: This is in the process of being translated and is being published in a series of posts, all of which can be found at this link.
