= Louis Gurlitt =

German-Danish landscape painter

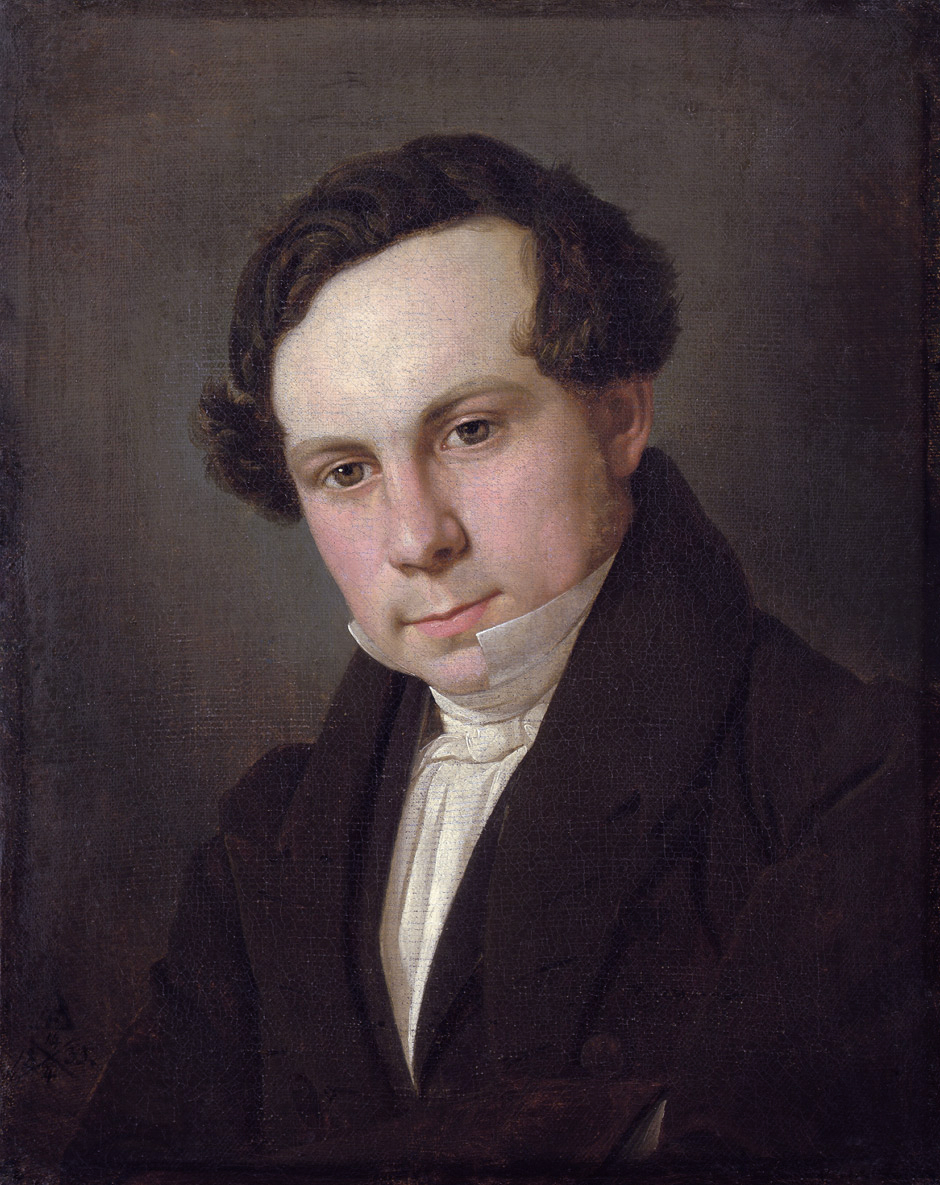
- Louis Gurlitt
- Born: Heinrich Louis Theodor Gurlitt; 8 March 1812; Altona, Holstein
- Died: 19 November 1897 (aged 85); Naundorf near Schmiedeberg, Saxony
- Occupation: Landscape painter
- Spouses: Elise Saxild (1837–39); Julie Bürger (1843–44); Elisabeth Lewald (1847–1897)
- Children: Wilhelm (second marriage); 5 sons, 1 daughter in third marriage; among others: Cornelius, Fritz, Ludwig
- Parents: Johan August Wilhem Gurlitt; Helene Eberstein
- Relatives: Cornelius Gurlitt (brother)

Heinrich Louis Theodor Gurlitt (8 March 1812 – 19 September 1897), also called Louis Gurlitt, was a Danish-German painter of landscapes. His brother was the composer Cornelius Gurlitt, and his son was the architect and art historian also called Cornelius Gurlitt.

== Biography ==
Gurlitt was born in Altona in Holstein to Johann August Wilhelm Gurlitt and Helene Eberstein, as part of the Gurlitt family. Altona was then one of the largest Danish towns, due to royal privileges allowing among other things freedom of religion. He received his first degree from Siegfried Detlev Bendixen's studio in Hamburg. Gurlitt studied in Copenhagen 1832 and won a silver medal in 1833, and exhibited here until about 1875. The academy recommended him as one of the most mature and talented students. He married Elise Saxild in 1837. After her death in 1839 he married Julie Bürger, with whom he had a son. After his second wife's death in 1844 he married Elisabeth Lewald in 1847. After the marriage he lived in Austria and Germany. Being from Holsten, he chose the German side in the Schleswig conflicts between 1848 and 1864, when Prussia won the war and Schleswig-Holstein which was under the reign of the Danish king. He was known for his oil paintings. Gurlitt stayed well connected to Danish painters. But he was born Danish and then became German. The Royal collection of paintings owns six of his famous works. His painting titled Norwegian Landscape was auctioned at $22,174 in 2012 at Sotheby's London "European Paintings". A few of his Paintings are:

- Landscape Near Salzburg
- Monte Pellegrino
- Bay Of Ieranto With Fishermen
- North Italian Landscape

His Paintings were at "19th century paintings" and "19th century European paintings" auctions.

== Selected paintings ==
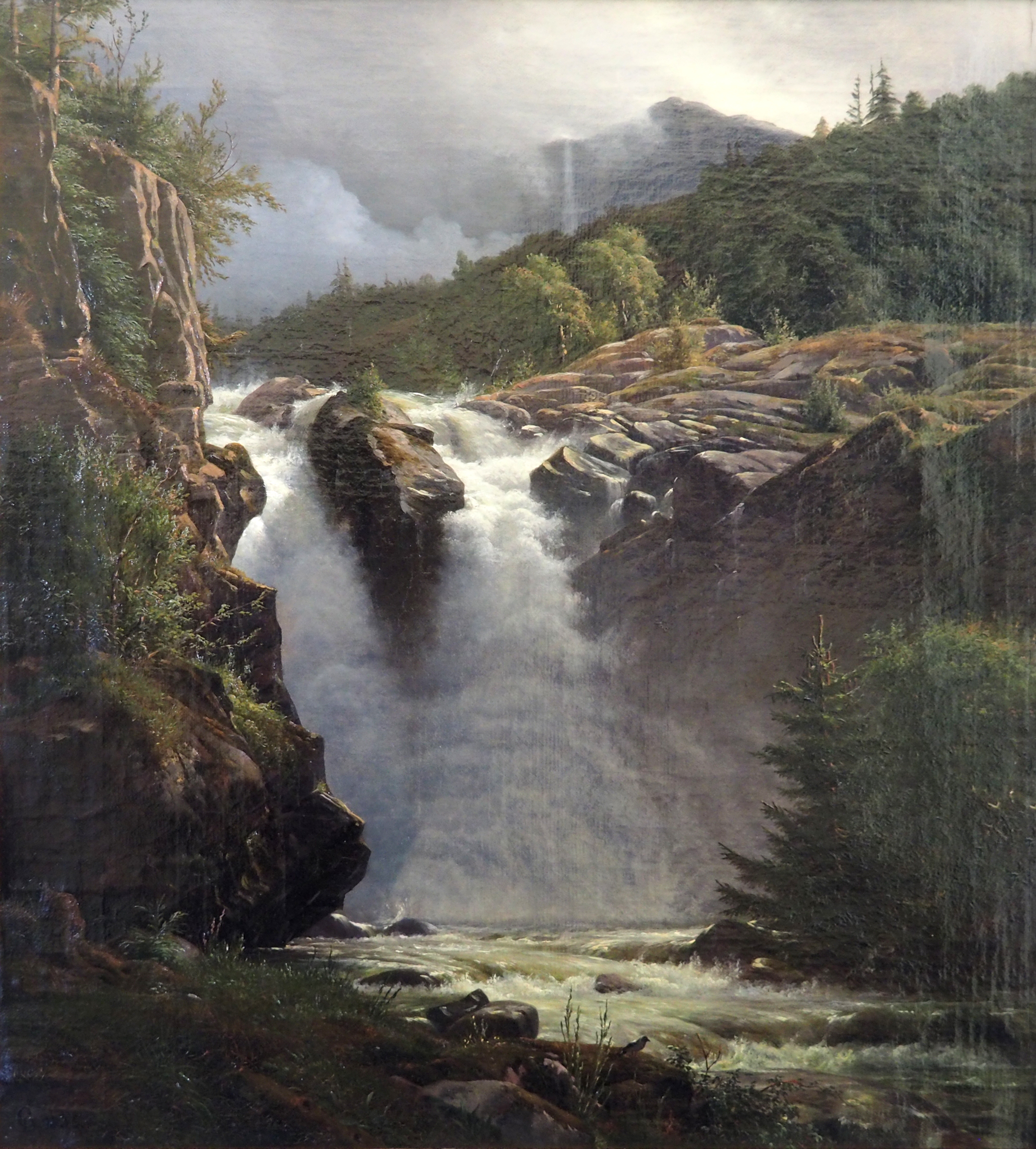
Norwegian Waterfall

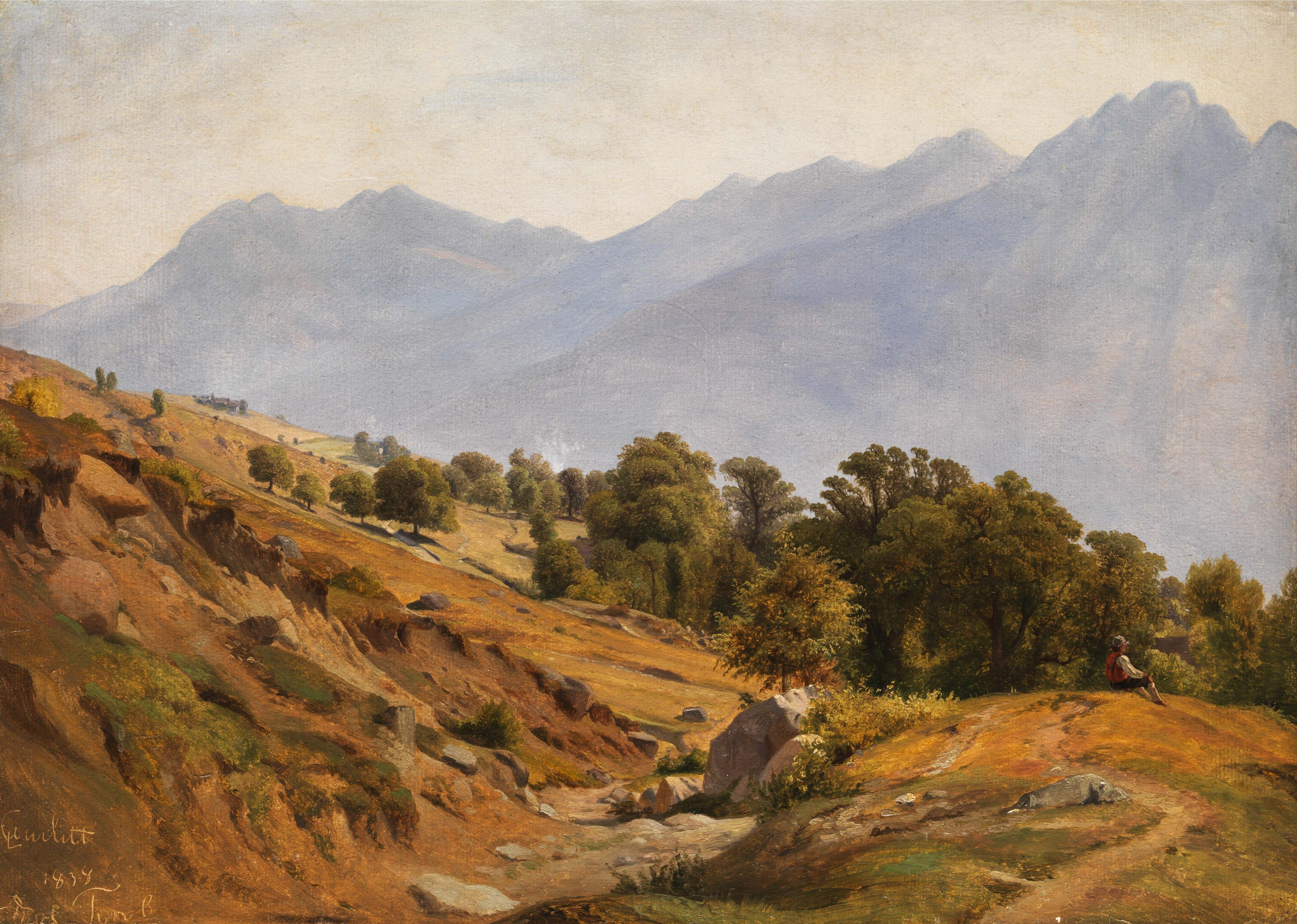
Mountain landscape around Dorf Tirol

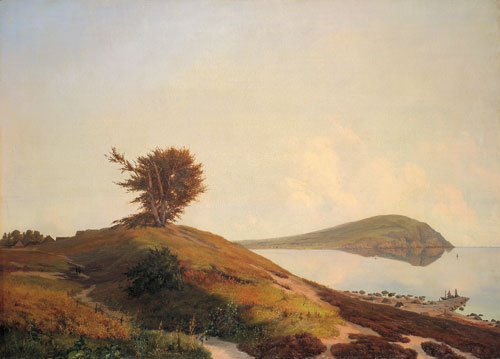
Evening at Kullen

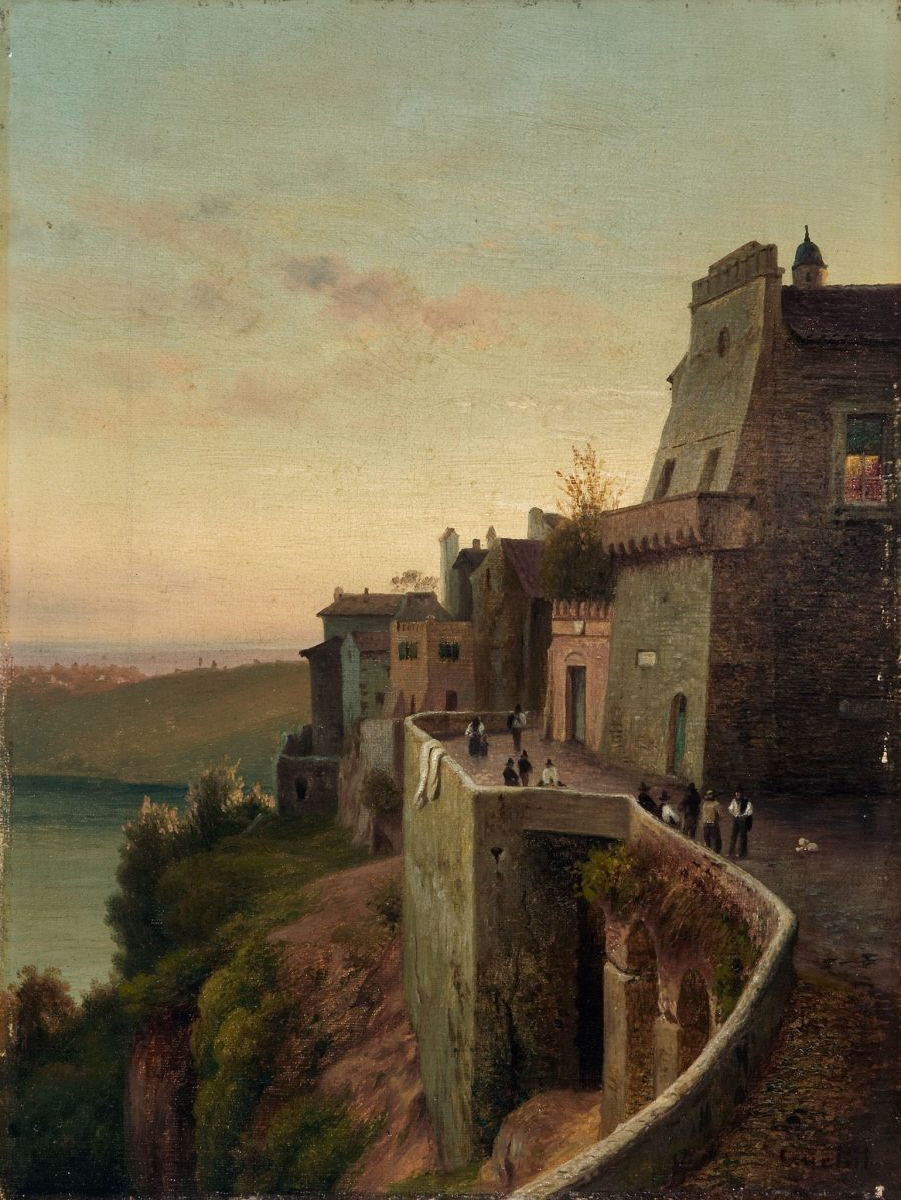
Evening Mood on Lake Nemi

== See also ==
- List of German painters
