= Leopold Weinstein =

Austrian businessman and art collector

Leopold Weinstein (April 6, 1884 – November 8, 1948, Vienna) was an Austrian businessman and art collector persecuted by the Nazis because he was Jewish.

== Life ==
Weinstein was born on April 6, 1884, in Vienna where he owned "Leopold Weinstein & Co.", a manufacturer of glassware and lighting, located at Vienna VII, Hermanngasse 18, and collected art.

== Art collection ==
The Leopold Weinstein collection included works by Waldmüller, Rudolf von Alt, Schindler, Ranftl, Pettenkofen as well as Jettel, Windhager and Hampel.

== Nazi era ==
Of Jewish origin, Weinstein was persecuted by the Nazis after Austria's Anschluss with Nazi Germany in 1938. Weinstein fled to London and returned to Vienna after the end of the war.

In 1938 Franz Bock took over the provisional management of the company "Leopold Weinstein & Co. In 1938 some paintings from Weinstein's collection were "seized", among them by Ferdinand Georg Waldmüller and von Alt. These were consigned to the Wiener Städtische Sammlung and the Landesmuseum Joanneum.

In January 1939 Karl Wagner, director of the Städtische Sammlungen / Historical Museum of Vienna requested art objects from the Aryanized collections of Leopold Weinstein, as well as from the collections of Oskar Bondy, Ferdinand Bloch-Bauer and Serena Lederer.

== Postwar ==
After the war Weinstein returned to Vienna. Restitution claims were filed for the artwork stolen by the Nazis and their collaborators in Vienna. August von Pettenkofen's Gypsy hut in the Puszta was restituted to Weinstein's heirs on November 23, 2004

== Readings ==
- Source Lillie, Sophie, "Was einmal war - Handbuch der entteigneten Kunstsammlungens Wiens," Vienna 2003, p. 1295 f.
- Restitutionsbericht 2007 - Kunst

== See also ==
- The Holocaust in Austria
- Vugesta
- List of Claims for Restitution for Nazi-looted Art
