= Heinrich Rieger =

Heinrich Rieger (25 December 1868 in Sereď, Austria-Hungary – 17 October 1942 in the Theresienstadt ghetto) was an Austrian dentist whose art collection was one of the most important in Austrian modern art. Rieger and his wife were murdered in the Holocaust.

== Life ==
=== Education and early years ===
Rieger was the son of Philipp and Eva Rieger, née Schulhof. He was born in Sereď an der Waag in the administrative district of Pressburg (now Bratislava), which at that time belonged to the Hungarian half of the empire. After graduating from the "Reformed Obergymnasium" in Budapest in 1885, Rieger studied medicine in Vienna. On 10 December 1892 he received his doctorate in medicine and began work as a resident dentist in Vienna. At the age of 25, Heinrich Rieger married 23-year-old Bertha Klug, daughter of a café owner, in Sereď on 30 May 1893. The couple had three children. On 28 March 1901, Rieger acquired a villa in Gablitz, in which he also practiced.

=== The Rieger Collection ===
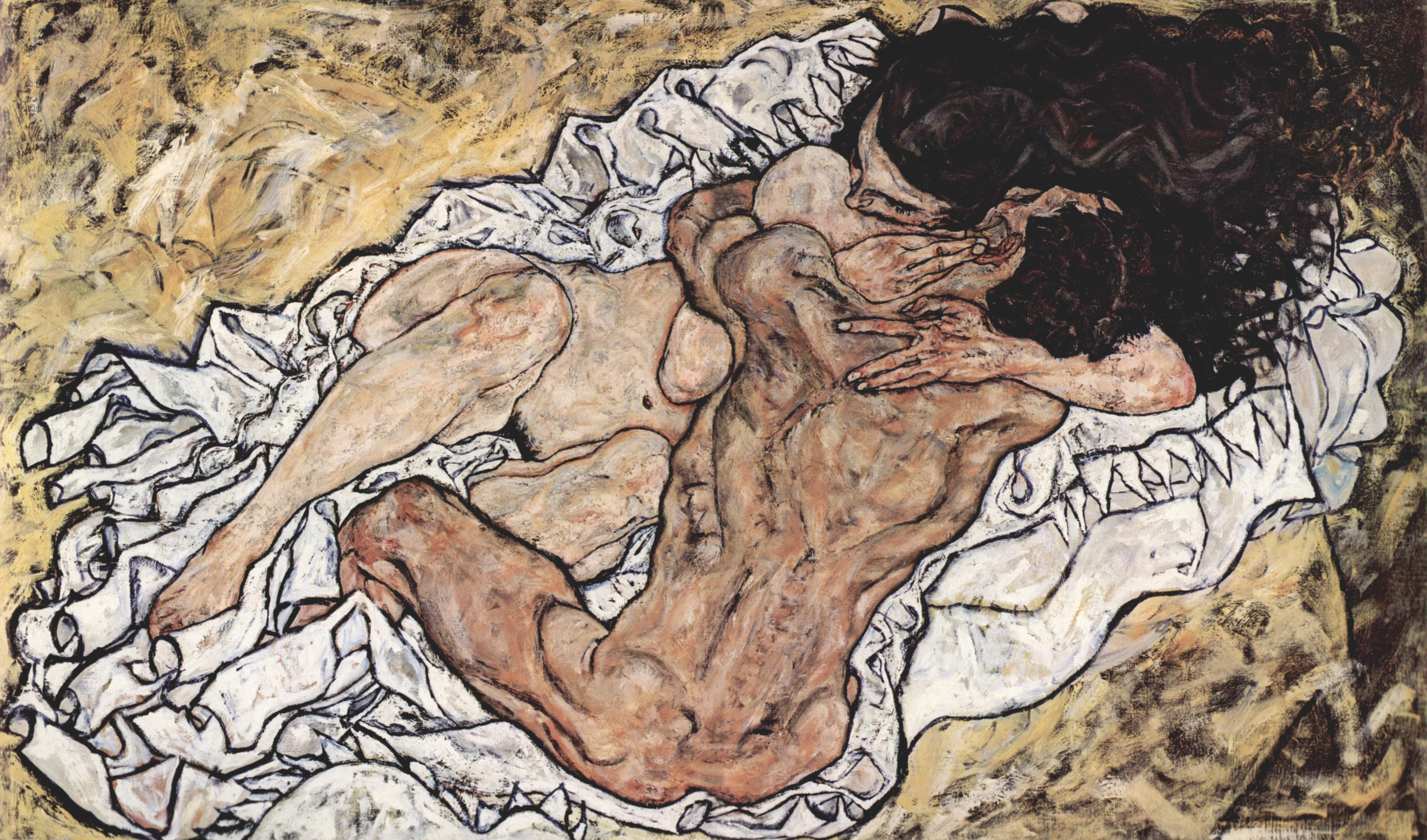
The Embrace by Egon Schiele, oil on canvas, formerly part of the Rieger Collection - today owned by the Austrian Gallery Belvedere.

Rieger began collecting contemporary works of art around 1900. He often accepted works of art from penniless artists instead of money as payment for dental treatments. This brought him into contact with young artists such as Egon Schiele and Oskar Kokoschka, who were then living in Vienna, and became their sponsor. This is how the core of his collection came into being. Through further acquisitions, Rieger's collection became one of the most important of Austrian modern art alongside the Oskar Reichert collection. During the First World War, Rieger acquired over 120 works. In the years up to 1921, the inventory grew again by more than 250 works by young painters such as Käthe Kollwitz, Anton Faistauer, Karl Sterrer, Albin Egger-Lienz, Liebermann, and Franz Stuck.

Rieger collected many works by Egon Schiele whose first fifty drawings came into Rieger's ownership between 1915 and 1918 - most of the oil paintings, such as the work "Cardinal and Nun" or "The Embrace", in 1918. In 1921, Rieger owned twelve oil paintings by Schiele initially housed in Rieger's private rooms in Vienna, in his practice rooms, and in his villa in Gablitz, Linzerstr. 99, open to a limited public only.

Artworks in Rieger's collection are known from a surviving insurance list from 1935 and another list created for the autumn exhibition of the "Cooperative of Visual Artists Vienna" in the Künstlerhaus Vienna, which opened on 9 November 1935. The latter list showed that Rieger had loaned around 200 works of art, including Schiele's oil painting "Cardinal and Nun".

At the World Exhibition in Paris in 1937, four Schiele works from Rieger's collection were shown as part of an exhibition of Austrian art in the Galerie Nationale du Jeu de Paume.

Before March 1938, the collection should have included around 120 to 150 drawings by Schiele.

== Anschluss and Nazi persecution ==
After the 13 March 1938 Anschluss with Nazi Germany, Rieger was persecuted because he was Jewish.

Special anti-Jewish laws forced Austrian Jews like Rieger to declare their assets, in preparation for the seizure of their property. Rieger's art collection was assessed by Bruno Grimschitz, a Nazi who was Deputy Director and Acting Director of the Österreichische Galerie Belvedere in Vienna. However, the Grimschitz list of estimates of the collection, which was assumed to contain around 800 objects at the time, has been lost to this day.

With the "Fourth Ordinance to the Reich Citizenship Law" of 31 July 1938, Jews were forced out of the medical profession on 31 August 1938. Forbidden to practice medicine because he was Jewish, and impoverished by the confiscation of property and the Nazi's anti-Jewish fees and penalties, Rieger was forced to sell artworks in November 1938.

Rieger owned Schiele's "Embrace" and "Cardinal and Nun" as well as Josef Dobrowsky's "Arms in the Spirit". Part of the Rieger collection was acquired in March 1941 by the Austrian graphic artist Luigi Kasimir, who, together with Ernst Edhoffer, ran an art shop in Vienna, Gall and Goldmann, that had been Aryanized from the Jewish owner, Elsa Gall, whose collection was also seized by the Gestapo. Kasimir sold around twenty works from the Rieger Collection during the war years. Further works were found in Kasimir's private apartment in 1947. Both Welz and Kasimir paid little with undervalued estimates thought to be provided by Nazi Party member Bruno Grimschitz. Postwar, they were charged with § 6 KVG, "improper enrichment" ("Aryanization"). However, the proceedings against Welz ended with an out-of-court settlement, while Kasimir was acquitted because he had recognized all restitution claims. Some of the works were returned to Rieger's son, Robert Rieger, who lived in the USA, however Austria refused export licences which forced families to sell in Austria after restitution.

The Rieger Collection was thus dismantled. However, some of Egon Schiele's drawings from the Rieger Collection are still lost.

=== Deportation ===
On 24 September 1942, the Nazis deported Rieger and his wife to the Theresienstadt ghetto on the 42nd transport. After initiating a death declaration procedure, it was established on 7 March 1947 that Heinrich Rieger had been murdered there on 17 October 1942, although specifics remained unclear. Berta Rieger was deported from Theresienstadt to Auschwitz in 1944, where she was murdered immediately upon arrival. The Nazi Riech seized the Riegers' assets in accordance with the "Ordinance on the Confiscation of Assets Hostile to the People and the State in Austria" of 18 November 1938.

=== Family ===
Rieger's son, Ludwig (1894–1913) and his third-born daughter Antonia (1897–1933) died through suicide. Their son Robert (1894–1985) became a doctor, emigrated to the USA in 1938, and was the legal successor to his father's art collection.

== Claims for Nazi-looted art ==
The Rieger family have successfully filed restitution claims for artworks by Egon Schiele that were seized by the Nazis; many of the claims involved long and difficult court battles and commissions.

In 2002 the Israelitische Kultusgemeinde Wien requested that the Austrian police seize Wayside Shrine (1907) by Egon Schiele, asserting that it had been looted from the Rieger collection.

In 2016 Rieger's heirs filed suit against Robert "Robin" Owen Lehman for Schiele's Portrait of the Artist's Wife (1917). The heirs of Karl Maylaender also filed suit against Lehman. Lehman then sued both families.

In 2021 Schiele's Kauernder weiblicher Akt (Crouching Female Nude) was restituted to the Rieger family. Its fate after 1938 was unknown until, in 1965, it appeared in a sale by the Brazilian collector Walter Geyerhahn to the Swiss art dealer Marianne Feilchenfeldt. The latter helped the city of Cologne to acquire it through the Freunde des Wallraf-Richartz-Museum in April 1966. The Schiele has been in the collection of the Museum Ludwig since 1976.

== Literature ==
- Michael Wladika: Dossier Dr. Heinrich Rieger. Provenienzforschung im Auftrag des Leopold Museums. Dezember 2009. Seiten 17f. (online)

== See also ==
- The Holocaust in Austria
- List of claims for restitution for Nazi-looted art
- Portrait of Wally
- Aryanization
