= Jewish Restitution Successor Organization =

The Jewish Restitution Successor Organization Inc. (JRSO, also IRSO) was founded in 1947 in New York by various American and international Jewish organizations. Originally, it was incorporated on May 15, 1947, as the Jewish Restitution Commission, but in 1948 changed its name to the Jewish Restitution Successor Organization at the request of American military authorities.

== History ==
The JRSO founders were twelve of the largest Jewish organizations worldwide: American (American Jewish Committee, American Jewish Joint Distribution Committee, Jewish Cultural Reconstruction), British (Anglo-Jewish Association, Board of Deputies of British Jews, Central British Fund, Council for the Protection of the Rights and Interests of Jews from Germany), French (Conseil Représentatif des Institutions juives de France), Zionist (Agudas Israel World Organization, Jewish Agency for Palestine), an organization representing the interests of the Jewish congregations in the American Zone (Interessenvertretung Israelitischer Kultusgemeinden in der US Zone) and an international organization (World Jewish Congress).

The goal of the JRSO was to institute proceedings in the American occupation zone for the restitution of heirless property of murdered persons and dissolved organizations that had been pursued on racial grounds under the Nazi regime. The assets obtained in this manner were distributed by the JRSO to Jewish institutions and organizations, primarily in the USA and Israel. In the United States, funds were distributed through various communal organizations, such as the American Federation of Jews from Central Europe.

The parallel organizations in the British and French zones of Germany were the Jewish Trust Corporation Ltd. (JTC) and the Jewish Trust Corporation Branche Française (JTC BF).

== Literature ==
- Constantin Goschler/Jürgen Lillteicher (Hrsg:): "Arisierung" und Restitution. Die Rückerstattung jüdischen Eigentums in Deutschland und Österreich nach 1945 und 1989. 1. Auflage. Wallstein, Göttingen 2002, ISBN 3-89244-495-1.
- Sebastian Panwitz: Die Gesellschaft der Freunde 1792-1935. Berliner Juden zwischen Aufklärung und Hochfinanz. 1. Auflage. Olms, Hildesheim/New York/Zürich 2007, ISBN 978-3-487-13346-1 (Haskala, 34).
- Saul Kagan and Ernest H Weismann. Report on the operations of the Jewish Restitution Successor Organization, 1947-1972 (1972).
- Shlomit Steinberg. Orphaned Art: Looted Art from the Holocaust in the Israel Museum, Exhibition Catalogue, The Israel Museum, Jerusalem, 2008
- Shlomit Steinberg."Provenance Research in Museums: Between History and Methodology", Taking Responsibility, Nazi-looted Art – A Challenge for Museums, Libraries and Archives, Magdeburg, 2009, pp. 307–319
- Shlomit Steinberg, "The Road Paved with Good Intentions: Between Berlin and Jerusalem 1945-1955", Auf der Suche nach einer verlorenen Sammlung, Das Berliner Judisches Museum (1933-1938), Exhibition Catalogue, Berlin, 2011, pp. 48–57
- Shlomit Steinberg, "The Road to recovery: From the Central Collecting Points to a Safe Haven – The J.R.S.O, Dossier". In Schriftenreihe der Kommission fur Provenienzforschurg 3, Christopher Bazil and Eva Blimlinger (eds.). Bohlau Verlag, Wien-Koln–Weimar, 2012, pp. 119–132
- Shlomit Steinberg, "Three stops on the Road to Recovery – Three Restitution cases at the Israel Museum, Jerusalem", In The West Versus the East or The United Europe?", Proceedings of the 5th International Academic Conference, Podebrady, 8–9 October 2013 pp. 84-91
- Shlomit Steinberg, "The Long Way from Wiesbaden to Jerusalem", in The International Forum on Restitution of Holocaust Era Cultural Assets in Israel, Tel Aviv, June 24, 2014, pp. 21–25
- Stephan Templ/Tina Walzer, Unser Wien (Our Vienna)
