= Samuel Schallinger =

Austrian Jewish businessman and holocaust victim

- Born: July 15, 1867
- Died: January 11, 1943 (aged 75); Theresienstadt concentration camp, Prague, Czechoslovakia
- Occupations: Co-owner of the Imperial and the Bristol hotels in Vienna, Austria

Samuel Schallinger (1867–1943) was an Austrian Jewish businessman and hotelier who was killed in the Holocaust.

== Biography ==
Born in 1867 in Austria, Schallinger was a Jewish businessman who was co-owner of the Imperial and the Bristol hotels in Vienna, Austria, which today are still among the city of Vienna's grandest hotels.

Following the annexation of Austria by Nazi Germany in 1938, Schallinger's hotels underwent "Aryanization" and he was forced to give up his shares. In October 1942, he and his family were deported to Theresienstadt concentration camp near Prague, Czechoslovakia where they all died; Schallinger himself died just three months later in January of 1943.

Details of the property seized from Schallinger and other Austrian Jews under the Nazis, and names of the famous beneficiaries who took them and never gave them back, are outlined in the book Unser Wien (Our Vienna) by Stephan Templ and Tina Walzer.

== See also ==
- The Holocaust in Austria
- Nazi plunder
