= Knize =

Knize may refer to:

- Kníže (title), equivalent of "duke" or "prince", used in medieval Slavic countries such as Bohemia
- Kniže & Comp., the Viennese clothing store named after a Czech surname
- Josef Kniže (d. 1880), Czech tailor who founded Kniže & Comp.
- Frederic Wolff-Knize (1890–1949), Austrian businessman and art collector
- Petr Kníže, Czech martial artist
