= American Federation of Jews from Central Europe =

Jewish social services organization in New York City

The American Federation of Jews from Central Europe was established in New York City in 1939 to coordinate services to German-speaking Jewish refugees entering the United States. It was incorporated in 1941. The Federation offered social services, assistance with immigration paperwork, and support with education and job placement. It also put on cultural activities. The Federation focused on issues of immigration between 1939 and the end of World War II, after which it shifted towards issues of restitution. The first branch of the United Restitution Organization was founded in 1948 as part of the American Federation of Jews from Central Europe, and the federation helped distribute funds from the Jewish Restitution Successor Organization and the Jewish Trust Corporation.

Dr. Hermann Müller was the federation's executive director from 1941 to 1963, followed by Curt Silberman.
