= JTC =

JTC may mean:

- Jack Chick
- JTC Corporation of Singapore
- ISO/IEC JTC 1, Joint Technical Committee 1 of the International Organization for Standardization (ISO) and the International Electrotechnical Commission (IEC)
- Japanese Touring Car Championship
- Jewish Trust Corporation, a body formed to pursue claims for the restitution of heirless property taken during the Nazi regime
- James Trademore, a fictional character from Kamen Rider: Dragon Knight nicknamed "JTC"
- Bauru-Arealva Airport in Brasil (IATA code)
- James T. Cotton, an alias of American musician Dabrye
- Jumping to conclusions
- Juventus Training Center (Vinovo), an Italian football facility in Vinovo, 14 kilometres from the city of Turin
- Juventus Training Center (Turin), an Italian football facility in the city of Turin
