= Frederic Wolff-Knize =

German businessman

Frederic ("Fritz") Wolff-Knize (26 July 1890 – October 1949) was a German businessman, owner of Kniže & Comp. and an art collector.

== Personal life ==
Knize married Annie (née Rothmüller), who was born on 10 October 1905, and died in November 1979 in New Canaan, Connecticut. They lived in Vienna IV, Wohllebengasse 8 / III and in Dürrenast in Thun, Switzerland.

Knize directed "Kniže & Comp.", in Vienna I., Graben 13 with branches in Bad Gastein, Szgb., Berlin, Prague and Karlsbad.

== Art collection ==
The Wolff-Knize collection included an ethnographic collection and numerous works by Oskar Kokoschka as well as art by Marc Chagall and others. Following his death in 1949, his substantial collection was broken up and sold, partly at the Kende Galleries in New York. Among the Kokoschka's in the Knize family collection was "Zwei Mädschen"

== Nazi era ==
When Austria was merged with the Third Reich in the Anschluss of 1938, Knize, his family and business were persecuted because of their Jewish heritage. Knize escaped to Paris; but in 1939 he was interned at Bassens. The Knize company was Aryanized in 1938, that is removed from Jewish ownership and placed under non-Jewish control. It was placed under provisional administration; in 1941 his property in Vienna was removed and sold via the Nazi VUGESTA looting organization.

Frederic Wolff-Knize died in 1949. His wife, Annie, lived in the USA until her death.

== Postwar ==
In 1950, Anni Wolff-Knize tried to recover "The Lying Woman" by Schiele. This was refused by the Federal Monuments Office and finally sold to Rudolf Leopold. Today it represents one of the highlights of the Leopold Museum.

As of 2021, there were 19 paintings and nine other artworks from the collection of Annie and Frederic Knize listed in the German Lost Art Foundation database.

== See also ==
- List of claims for restitution for Nazi-looted art
- The Holocaust in Austria
- Vugesta
