= Stefan Mautner =

Austrian entrepreneur and painter (1877–1944)

Stefan Mautner, also Stephan Mautner, (born 12 February 1877 in Vienna; died presumably July 1944 in Auschwitz concentration camp) was an Austrian entrepreneur and the eldest son of Isidor Mautner, a major industrialist, and his wife Jenny.

== Early life ==
Stefan Mautner was the eldest of four children of the Jewish industrialist Isidor Mautner and his wife Jenny (née Neuman(n)). He was groomed by his father as a successor in his concern. Stefan was the only one of the four children to complete a full school education at the Schottengymnasium in Vienna. After graduating from high school in 1895 and completing one year of military service, he attended a weaving school and carried out an internship at the mechanical weaving mill in Schumburg an der Desse, which belonged to the company Isaac Mautner & Sohn.

In 1898, he was appointed "commercial rapporteur" for a "commercial study trip to East Asia" by the president of the Reichenberg Chamber of Commerce, whose district included Schumburg. After his return, he married Elsa Eissler in April 1900 and moved into a house in Vienna's Cottage Quarter. They had four children.

== Business career ==
After the death of his grandfather, Stefan Mautner took over his position as general partner of the company Isaac Mautner & Sohn on 27 April 1901, becoming vice president of the company by 1916. Stephan also assumed positions on the boards in his father's numerous other companies. In the company "Deutsche Textilwerke Mautner AG," founded in 1915, Stephan held one of the three positions on the board of directors, and in 1916, together with his father, he took over the management of the Pölser Papierfabrik and the Eisenwerke Sandau. In addition, Stephan Mautner became a member of the Income Tax Estimation Commission in 1912, a member of the Arbitration Court of the Goods Industry in 1913, and a member of the Board of the Association of Austrian Cotton Spinners in 1916.

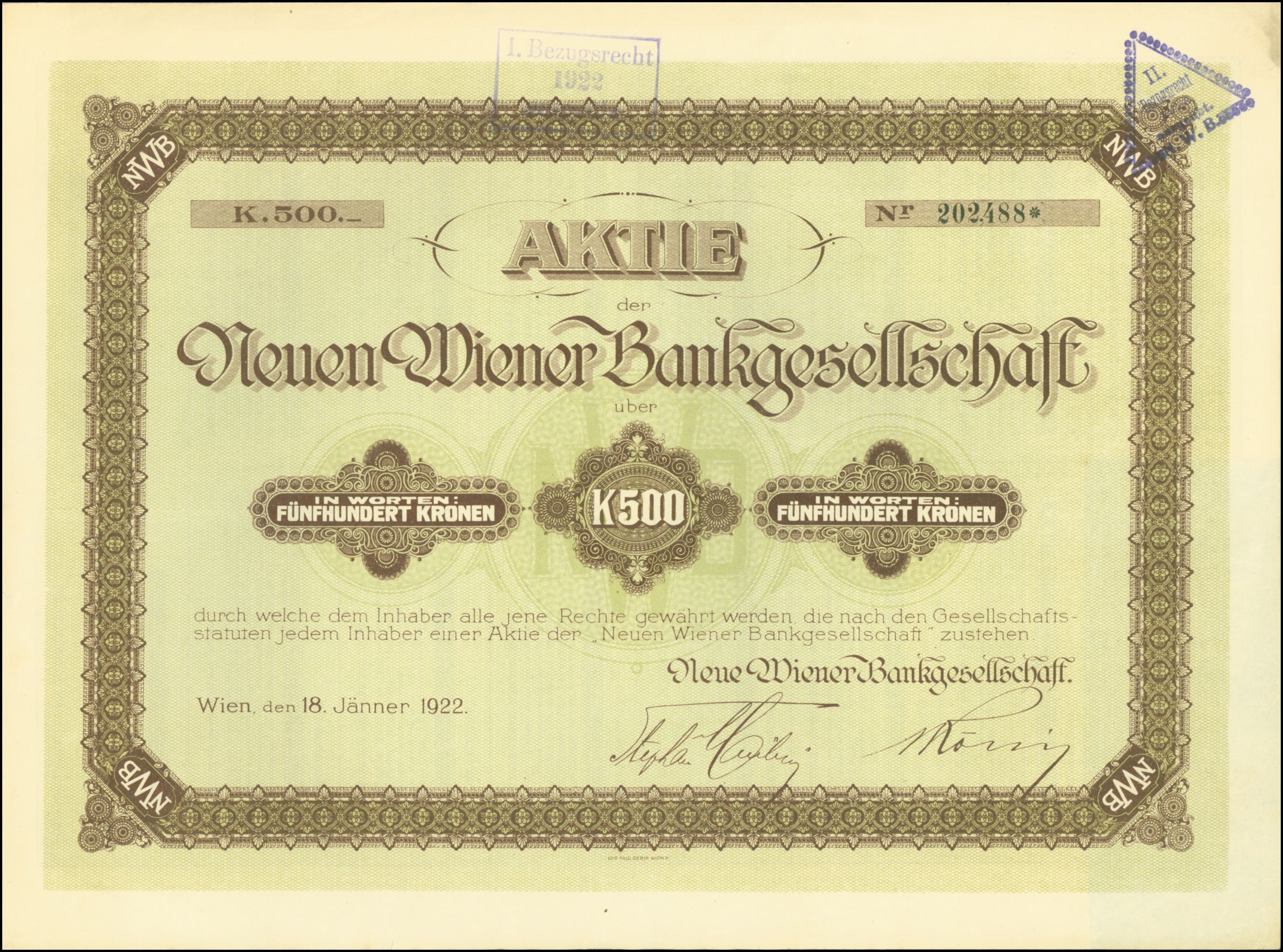
Share for 500 kroner of Neue Wiener Bankgesellschaft dated 18 January 1922

After World War I, he was elected president of the newly founded Neue Wiener Bankgesellschaft in 1921, of which Isidor Mautner was the main shareholder. The Vienna banking crisis of 1924 brought this institution to the brink of bankruptcy, and business could only be continued by Isidor Mautner pledging his real estate holdings with the Austrian National Bank. On 31 October 1926 he dissolved the bank, which contributed significantly to the collapse of his father's corporate empire.

After the death of his father on 13 April 1930, Mautner resigned from all his posts and devoted his time almost exclusively to his two great passions, hunting and painting. He had a large hunting ground with a hunting lodge in Trattenbach am Wechsel and had enjoyed a sound artistic education in his youth, most recently with the renowned painter Hugo Charlemont.

== Nazi persecution and murder ==
After the merging of Austria with Nazi Germany in the Anschluss on 14 March 1938, Mautner was deprived of all his assets, including his valuable art collection, because of his Jewish heritage. His children fled to the USA. He fled to Hungary with his wife. Both were deported from Budapest to the Auschwitz concentration camp in July 1944 and murdered there, though the exact circumstances are not known. The Austrian Nazi looting organisation called the Vugesta was involved in plundering and "redistributing" Mautner's possession. Mautner had to forcibly sell parts of his collection. Another part was blocked for export. The belongings were confiscated by VUGESTA in 1941 and sold under consignment no. 1083.

== Legacy ==
Some of Mautner's paintings and drawings are at the Albertina Museum in Vienna. Mautner also wrote literary works, which he provided with his own illustrations and graphics: Das Haus auf der Dürr, published in 1918 by Waldheim-Eberle; Farbige Stunden, published in 1921 by Verlag der Wiener Graphischen Werkstätte, which contains some experiences on the trip to East Asia in 1898, and Farbige Stunden, 2nd part, published in 1927 by Steyrermühl-Verlag, about hunting.

Art historians and scholars of the Holocaust are researching the provenance of artworks from Mautner's collection.

== Writings ==
- Bericht über eine kaufmännische Studienreise nach Ostasien. Selbstverlag, Wien 1899.
- Das Haus auf der Dürr. Waldheim-Eberle, Wien 1918 (unter dem Titel Trattenbach auch als Privatdruck erschienen).
- Farbige Stunden. Verlag der Wiener Graphischen Werkstätte, Leipzig u. Wien 1921.
- Farbige Stunden. 2. Teil. Steyrermühl, Wien 1927.

== Literature ==
- M. Bucek: Mautner, Stephan. In: Österreichisches Biographisches Lexikon 1815–1950. 2. überarbeitete Auflage (nur online).
- Mautner, Stephan. In: Susanne Blumesberger, Michael Doppelhofer, Gabriele Mauthe: Handbuch österreichischer Autorinnen und Autoren jüdischer Herkunft 18. bis 20. Jahrhundert. Band 2: J–R. Hrsg. von der Österreichischen Nationalbibliothek. Saur, München 2002, ISBN 3-598-11545-8, S. 910.
- Wolfgang Hafer: Die anderen Mautners. Das Schicksal einer jüdischen Unternehmerfamilie. Hentrich & Hentrich, Berlin 2014, ISBN 978-3-95565-061-2.

== See also ==
- The Holocaust in Austria
- Nazi plunder
