= Commission for Provenance Research =

The Commission for Provenance Research (Kommission für Provenienzforschung) is an institution of the Republic of Austria for provenance research, based in Vienna. Created in February 1998 at the Federal Ministry responsible for culture at the time — which is now the Federal Ministry for Art, Culture, the Civil Service and Sport. Its members work as provenance researchers in the various federal museums and collections.

== Background and mission ==
After Austria merged with Nazi Germany in the Anschluss of 1938, Jews in Austria were persecuted, forced to flee or murdered. Their property was seized or appropriated with or without a veneer of legatlity under anti-Jewish race laws. Under the Austrian Art Restitution Act of 1998, the Republic of Austria has the mandate to proactively research movable art and cultural assets that were seized from their owners during the National Socialist era (e.g. in the form of art theft, looted gold or the Aryanization of property carried out by the Nazi state) in the federally owned collection holdings and to transfer them to the former owners or their legal successors. The Commission for Provenance Research is responsible for systematically researching the collection holdings. The results are forwarded to the Art Restitution Advisory Board, which then makes recommendations to the responsible federal minister (restitution) regarding non-returns or returns.

If a positive restitution decision is made by the Ministry, the current owners or legal successors may be sought and contacted by the commission.

The website contains information on investigations, research opportunities and the commission's series of publications since 2008.

To celebrate its twentieth anniversary the Austrian Commission for Provenance Research initiated the publication of a digital encyclopaedia of provenance research entitled the Lexikon der österreichischen Provenienzforschung.

== Restitution to the wrong family ==
in 2018, it was discovered that a painting by Gustav Klimt, Apple Tree II, which had belonged to Serena Lederer, had been restituted by mistake to the wrong family, because the Austrian Art Restitution Advisory Board mistakenly confused the Klimt with a different painting.

== Nazi looting organisations ==
Austrian collections acquired art objects from Jews looted by Nazis through several looting organizations:

- Special commission Linz (the so-called Führer Museum/the so-called Linz Picture Gallery; Führer's reservation of June 18, 1938)
- Central Office for Jewish Emigration in Vienna was a Nazi-run organization which helped plunder Jews while forcing them to flee. It coordinated measures concerning citizenship, immigration law, foreign currency, Aryanization (transfer of property to non-Jews) and punitive property taxation targeting Jews. It was the only authority authorized to issue exit permits for Jews from Austria (1938–1941).
- Instructions from the Reich Ministry of Finance from the beginning of November 1941, so-called Action 3
- "M-Aktion", confiscations of (especially valuable) furnishings by the Reich Ministry for the Occupied Eastern Territories, in France and the occupied Benelux countries under the Einsatzstab Reichsleiter Rosenberg.

== See also ==
- The Holocaust in Austria
- Anschluss
- Unser Wien
- Claims for restitution for restitution for Nazi-looted art
