= Oscar Bondy =

Austrian entrepreneur

Oscar Bondy (born October 19, 1870, in Vienna; died December 3, 1944, in New York) was an Austrian entrepreneur and art collector persecuted by the Nazis because of his Jewish heritage.

== Life ==
Oscar Bondy, also known as Zucker-Bondy, owned sugar factories in Zdice and in České Meziříčí in Czechoslovakia, but had his business and private address in Vienna. His extensive collection of art and musical instruments, which included the portfolio works ("Mappenwerke") of Pieter Brueghel the Elder and the family portrait of Martin Johann Schmidt, was also located in the apartment at Schubertring 3 in Vienna.

In 1922 Oscar Bondy was named the heir of Nellie Bly.

== Nazi persecution ==
After Austria's 1938 Anschluss with Hitler's Third Reich, Bondy, who was Jewish, escaped to Switzerland and later emigrated to the US, where he died in 1944.

In July 1938, the Zentralstelle für Denkmalschutz (Central Office for the Protection of Monuments) seized numerous objects from the Bondy Collection and transferred them to the Central Depot of the Kunsthistorisches Museum in the Neue Burg, Vienna.

Bondy's extensive collection of rare music-related objects, was also confiscated soon after the Anschluss.

== Postwar ==
After the defeat of Nazi Germany in World War II, his widow Elisabeth fought a long struggle for the return of 2,000 pieces from the collection. Postwar Austria imposed onerous export conditions that extracted forced "donations". She died in Vienna in 1974.

The whereabouts of many of the artworks seized from Bondy's collection are unknown. Bondy's great-grandson Gerd von Seggern has been searching for them.

In April 2021 questions arose about a 15th-century portrait of Mary Magdalene that the Fine Arts Museum of San Francisco acquired in 1948 since after Bondy, the last known owner of the portrait was an important Nazi art dealer, Hans Wendland.

According to the Museum of Fine Art, Boston, many of the artworks that had been restituted from Bondy's collection were subsequently sold on the New York art market, particularly through [Frederick] Mont.

The Austrian Art Restitution Advisory Board continues to study the complicated fate of the Bondy collection, and issued a new report on November 5, 2021. The Commission noted that a renewed examination of the restitution record of the Oscar Bondy Collection found that seven of the 99 artworks from the Bondy collection that had appeared at the Salzburg Museum as of 1940, had not been handed over to Elisabeth Bondy after the decision on their restitution. The Austrian Advisory Board report also describes how Bondy was refused an export licence for certain restituted items, like the "Salzburg Stove", and thus unable to transfer them to a purchaser outside of Austria, which resulted in her donating them to the Salzburg Museum which prevented an issuing of an export licence until after the donation.

== See also ==
- List of Claims for Restitution for Nazi-looted art
- The Holocaust in Austria
- Anschluss
- Vugesta
- Unser Wien (Our Vienna)
