= Elsa Gall =

Austrian Jewish art dealer (1882-1963)

Elsa Gall (27 July 1882 - 16 January 1963) was an Austrian Jewish art dealer forced into exile by Nazi persecution. Her business was seized in March 1938. Like many others, she and her heirs have sought restitution and some of the Nazi plunder has since been given back in a slow-going process that, in her case and curiously, falsely gave a landscape by Robert Russ to the wrong claimants.

== Early life ==
Born in Vienna on 27 July 1882 into a Jewish family, the daughter of Sigmund Goldmann and Fanni Goldmann, Elsa married Hermann Gall (1871-1932). They owned an art dealership and publishing house, Halm & Goldmann. Elsa's husband Hermann died in 1932, after which she owned and operated the business from 1932 to 1938.

== Nazi era ==
When Austria merged with Nazi Germany in the Anschluss of 1938, Gall was persecuted under Nazi anti-Jewish laws. Her art dealership was Aryanized, the forcible transfer of assets to non-Jews. In March 1938 the art publisher Ernst Edhoffer and the etcher and Nazi party member Luigi Kasimir took control of Halm & Goldmann.

Elsa Gall fled to France and from there to the United States in 1939. The Galls' belongings, which had been stored at a shipping company, were confiscated by the Gestapo in November 1940 and sold by the Vugesta, a Nazi looting organization, in private sales or through the Dorotheum auction house.

== Restitution ==
All but two of the works seized by the Nazis stayed lost until Elsa Gall's death in 1963. The process of provenance research and restitution since has progressed slowly. A Gauermann painting housed in the Vienna Museum has remained pending a decision since 2009.

In 2004, the Austrian Restitution Commission issued its recommendation of restitution for an Italian landscape by Robert Russ that had belonged to Gall. However, the Commission made an error in identifying the owner, mistakenly returning the looted painting to the Popper family instead of the Gall family. The painting was auctioned at the Im Kinsky auction house in 2007 and the proceeds were given to the heirs of Franz Popper.

== See also ==
- The Holocaust in Austria
- Vugesta
- List of claims for restitution for Nazi-looted art
