= Bruno Grimschitz =

Bruno Grimschitz (23 April 1892 – 13 June 1964) was an Austrian art historian and museum director who belonged to the Nazi Party.

== Education ==
Grimschitz was born in Moosburg in Carinthia. He studied art history from 1910 at the University of Vienna under Max Dvořák and attended the Institute for Austrian Historical Research. During his studies he became a member of the student association Landsmannschaft Kärnten Wien in 1912. From 1914 to 1918 he took part in the First World War as a frontline officer. In 1918 he completed his studies with a dissertation on the subject of the artistic development of the architect Johann Lukas von Hildebrandt. He began his professional activity in 1919 as a research assistant at the Österreichische Galerie Belvedere (Belvedere Gallery) in Vienna, where he became curator in 1928. In 1932 he completed his habilitation at the Technical University of Vienna and in 1937 at the University of Vienna.

== Nazi curator ==
Grimschitz joined the Nazi Party officially on 1 May 1938, but "was given a low membership number indicating 'special services' to the Nazi Party during the Verbotzeit." From 1939 to 1945 he was director of the Belvedere Gallery. In addition, from 1940 to 1941 he headed the picture gallery in the Kunsthistorisches Museum.

During the Nazi era he was able to retain pieces of entartete Kunst in the museums he directed. He was however involved in acquiring looted art from Jews and concealing its origins. The journalist Hubertus Czernin described his role in the Nazi regime as one of the main actors in the aryanization of Vienna's private art collections. Accordingly, the museums he directed were able to expand their collections considerably. In 1944 he was appointed associate professor at the University of Vienna.

== Postwar ==
After the end of the Second World War, the State Office for Public Enlightenment, Education and Cultural Affairs removed Grimschitz from his post as director of the Belvedere Gallery by decree of 6 October 1945, due to his former NSDAP membership and put him into permanent retirement on 31 October 1947, as a "minor burden". He received his teaching licence back in 1956 and held it until 1963. He published numerous works, especially on the Viennese Baroque and 19th-century art in Austria. He died in Vienna in 1964.

== Publications (selection) ==
- Das Wiener Belvedere. Hölzel, Wien 1920
- Joh. Lucas von Hildebrandts künstlerische Entwicklung bis zum Jahre 1725. Hölzel, Wien 1922
- (with Moritz Dreger): Johann Lucas von Hildebrandts Kirchenbauten. Filser, Augsburg 1929
- Das Belvedere in Wien. Wolfrum, Wien 1946
- (with Eva Kraft): Wiener Barockpaläste. Wiener Verlag, Wien 1947
- Ferdinand Georg Waldmüller. Welz, Salzburg 1957
- Die Altwiener Maler. Wolfrum, Wien 1961
- Österreichische Maler vom Biedermeier zur Moderne. Wolfrum, Wien 1963

== See also ==
- Vugesta
- List of claims for restitution for Nazi-looted art
- Dorotheum
