= Luigi Kasimir =

Alois Heinrich Kasimir, known as Luigi Kasimir (1881–1962), was an Austro-Hungarian-born etcher, painter, printmaker and landscape artist. He was an early member of the Nazi party, and stood trial after World War II.

== Personal life ==
Kasimir was born in 1881 at Pettau, today Ptuj, Slovenia, then a part of the Austro-Hungarian monarchy. His grandfather was a painter and a poet, and his father an officer in the Habsburg army, who later became a professional painter. Kasimir attended the Vienna Academy of Art where he studied under William Unger, who introduced him to the technique of the colored etching, and also to his future wife, Tanna Hoernes (1887–1972), also an artist. His son, Robert Kasimir (1914–2002), was a painter and also, like his father, specialized in colored etchings. Luigi Kasimir died in 1962 in Grinzing, a suburb of Vienna.

== Activity at the time of National Socialism and subsequent trials ==
Kasimir was an early National Socialist, joining the Nazi party (NSDAP) in 1933, illegal at the time in Austria. He also belonged to Sturmabteilung of the NSDAP. He took over the Jewish firm that had represented him, and played a role in the purchase of paintings by Egon Schiele from the Heinrich Rieger collection.

After the end of National Socialist rule, Kasimir was charged in November 1945 with high treason, illegal membership in the NSDAP since 1933 and failure to register. The trial began on 16 June 1946 before the Austrian People's Court in Vienna. On 22 June 1946 Kasimir was sentenced to 18 months of severe, aggravated prison for illegality and registration fraud.

Furthermore, Kasimir was accused of unlawful enrichment through the Aryanization of the Halm & Goldmann art dealership. Apparently, after the Anschluss of Austria on 13 March 1938, Kasimir used his early party membership to acquire the Vienna-based art dealership. In October 1938, together with the art publisher Ernst Edhoffer, Kasimir signed a contract with the previous owner Elsa Gall, who until then had had the exclusive right to sell Kasimir's etchings, for a purchase price of 73,000 Reichsmarks (RM). Gall was Jewish origin and had decided to sell due to her perilous situation then was pressured to emigrate to the US in May 1939. As a result, Kasimir and Edhoffer did not meet the payment demands against Gall and probably made only a down payment of 10,000 RM. The company was entered into the commercial register on 20 January 1939 under the new name of Edhoffer & Kasimir.

As part of his work for his the company, Kasimir was suspected of another case of Aryanization. In March 1941 he bought part of the extensive art collection of the Jewish dentist and art collector Obermedizinalrat Heinrich Rieger for about 17,000 RM, a gross undervaluation of the collection, which, alongside the Reichel collection, was one of the most important of Austrian modern art. During the war years, Kasimir sold a large part of the collection which he had acquired in this way.

However, during the trial in June 1946, both Kasimir and Edhoffer were acquitted of disproportionate enrichment through Aryanization under the War Crimes Act, since Kasimir had recognized all claims for restitution within the framework of the Austrian restitution against him and the company Edhoffer & Kasimir.

In February 1947, the housing office of the City of Vienna conducted a search of Luigi Kasimir's apartment at Operngasse 13. The search resulted in the discovery of a total of 13 pictures with an estimated value of several 100,000 shillings, which was determined later. Allegedly, Kasimir's former secretary had hidden the works in the apartment to avoid impending confiscation. Also found were remnants of the Rieger collection, as well as pictures that had belonged to the daughter of the Jewish lawyer Benedikt and which Kasimir was said to have been given "to care for." The origin of other discovered artworks remained unclear.

As the newspaper Neues Österreich reported on 7 February 1947, Kasimir was released early from prison on the basis of a doctor's application because of a severe liver disease.

== Techniques ==
Kasimir was among the first to develop the technique of the colored etching. Before this, prints were usually hand-colored with the color being applied in a casual, haphazard manner. Kasimir would first create a sketch, usually in pastel. He then transferred the design onto as many as four to six plates, printing one after the other and applying the color on the plate by hand.

== Genres ==
Etching of Hoher Markt in Vienna by Kasimir

Kasimir is mainly famous for his etchings, but he also produced some oil painting, as well as some pastels. One of his favourite genres was the landscape, or veduta, especially monuments, street scenes, and tourist landmarks. He depicted places from all over Europe, especially Italy, Austria, and Germany. He also travelled to the United States to do a series of etchings of famous sights ranging from urban landmarks such as New York City skyscrapers to natural wonders like Yosemite Valley. Luigi Kasimir's etchings can be seen in many galleries and museums, including the Metropolitan Museum of Art in New York.

He designed an Oedipus and Sphinx bookplate for Sigmund Freud, who also hung an etching of the Roman Forum by Kasimir in his consulting room.
