= Curt Silberman =

American lawyer (1908-2002)

Curt C. Silberman
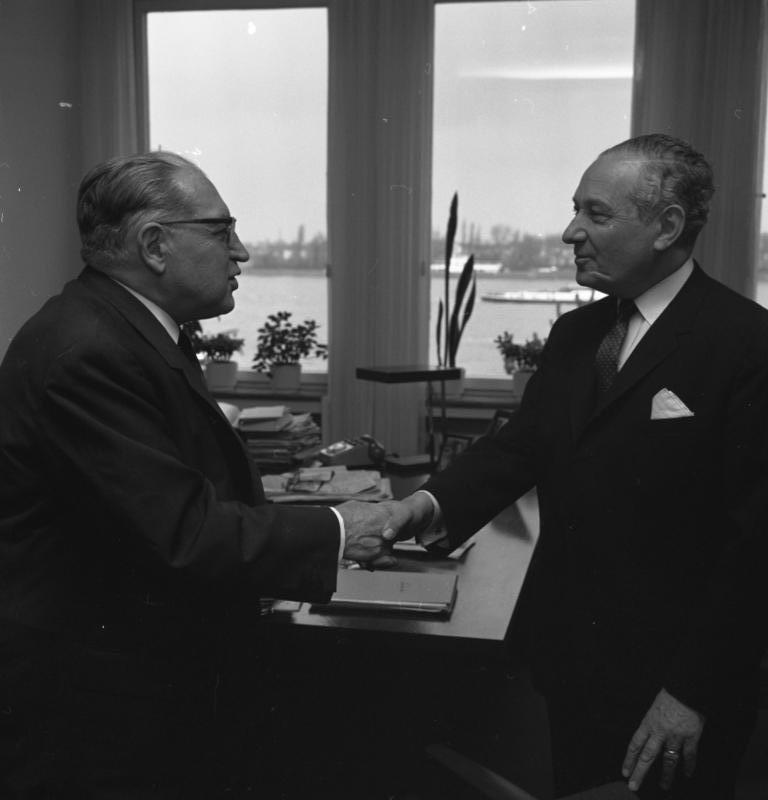
- Thomas Dehler and Curt Silberman in 1967
- Born: Kurt Leo Silbermann; May 23, 1908; Würzburg, Bavaria, Germany
- Died: September 9, 2002 (aged 94); Livingston, New Jersey
- Occupation: Lawyer

Curt C. Silberman (May 23, 1908 – September 9, 2002) was a German-Jewish and American attorney, community leader, and member of Jewish organizations in both Germany and the United States. Born Kurt Leo Silbermann in Würzburg, Germany, he and his wife Else fled due to the rampant antisemitism in Nazi Germany and settled in New Jersey. His legal career in the United States focused on restitution work for the victims of the Nazi government.

Silberman was active in many Jewish organizations. He was a co-founder of the Leo Baeck Institute, and for a period of time, the head of American Federation of Jews from Central Europe and a member of the Executive Committee of the Conference on Jewish Material Claims Against Germany.
