= Isidor Mautner =

Austrian entrepreneur

Isidor Mautner (also Izidor Mautner; 7 October 1852 – 13 April 1930) was an Austrian industrial magnate from the Mautner family.

== Early life ==
Isidor Mautner was born in Náchod, Bohemia, the second of nine children of the textile entrepreneur Isaac Mautner and his wife Julia, née Rosenfeld (1823–1907). In 1867 he joined his father's textile business. After his father had founded the commission merchant "Isaac Mautner & Co." in Vienna in the same year, Isidor moved his residence to Vienna in 1873 in order to save the trading company, which had run into difficulties after the Vienna Stock Exchange crash. After a successful reorganization, he became a partner in the new company "Isaac Mautner & Sohn" on 1 January 1874.

On 14 March 1876 Isidor Mautner married Eugenie (Jenny) Neumann, daughter of a wealthy Viennese silk merchant. With the help of her dowry, a mechanical weaving mill set up in 1868 by the Perutz brothers from Prague was purchased in Schumburg (Šumburk nad Desnou) in northern Bohemia in the same year. Another mechanical weaving mill was established in Náchod in 1881. In 1893, a wood grinding mill was acquired in Trattenbach, Lower Austria, which became the company's third mechanical weaving mill in 1896.

In 1878, he founded the "Baumwoll- und Leinenlieferungs-Gesellschaft für die k. k. Landwehr von Mautner & Consorten" with branches in Prague, Budapest and Trieste as well as a "Konfektionsanstalt" in Vienna. In 1882 Isidor Mautner opened the "Waerndorfer-Benedikt-Mautner Cotton Mill" in Náchod together with his two brothers-in-law, which he ran alone from 1907 onwards.

Mautner founded the Hungarian Textile Industry Joint Stock Company ("Magyar Textilipar R.T."), which established three weaving mills, three spinning mills and several textile finishing plants near Rosenberg in northern Hungary in 1894.

After his father's death Mautner transformed the company into Österreichische Textilwerke AG Isaac Mautner & Sohn in 1905 and expanded into Bohemia in the following years, adding, in 1906, weaving mills in Engenthal (Jesenny) and Grünwald, in 1908, a weaving mill in Tiefenbach (Potočna). In 1911, the Pick weaving mill in Náchod and a spinning mill in the Smíchov district of Prague were taken over. In addition, Isidor Mautner acquired stakes in spinning mills in Zwodau and Reichenberg.

In 1911, a textile plant with weaving, spinning, dyeing and finishing facilities was also acquired in Langenbielau, Silesia. After the acquisition of a cotton spinning mill in Plauen, the two companies were merged in 1915 to form "Deutsche Textilwerke Mautner AG" with headquarters in Plauen.

== 1914–1918 ==
After the monarchy's largest spinning company, Vereinigte Österreichische Textilindustrie AG, founded in 1912, ran into financial difficulties due to the loss of its operations on the Isonzo Front, Isidor Mautner's Österreichische Textilwerke AG took over its shares in 1916.. To compensate for the lost businesses, in the same year the "Fried. Mattausch & Sohn AG für Textilindustrie" in Franzensthal in northern Bohemia and the "Pottendorfer Baumwollspinnerei und Zwirnerei AG" in Pottendorf were taken over in the same year, followed by the "Felixdorfer Weberei und Appretur AG" in Felixdorf in 1917. In order to become independent of supplies "from enemy countries," the Sandau ironworks for the production of weaving machines was also founded in 1916 and a carded yarn and vigogn spinning mill in Friedland (Frydlant) in northern Bohemia was taken over."

Since the Entente powers' naval blockade had brought cotton imports to a virtual standstill, Isidor Mautner switched the production of his mills to paper textiles. To this end, paper mills in Priebus in Silesia, Pöls in Styria and Rosenberg were taken over in 1916 and 1917 and converted to the production of spun paper. This was then processed into paper yarn. In this way, Mautner succeeded in ensuring the operation of all factories even under the difficult conditions of the war economy. Towards the end of the war, Isidor Mautner headed one of the largest textile groups on the European continent with 42 factories and about 23,000 employees.

== 1919–1930 ==
After the First World War, Isidor Mautner succeeded in adapting his group to the new circumstances. The parent company was renamed "Textilwerke Mautner AG" in 1919. Due to the demand of the newly created Czechoslovak state for nostrification, the headquarters of the company was moved in 1920, first to Náchod, then to Prague. Vereinigte Österreichische Textilindustrie AG" now managed the Group's Austrian holdings, including the weaving mill in Trattenbach, which was exchanged for a spinning mill in Brodec, Czech Republic.

The factories in Littai, Priewald (Prebold) and Haidenschaft, which formerly belonged to the "Vereinigte Österreichische Textilindustrie AG", formed the Jugoslavische Textilwerke Mautner AG ("Jugoslovenske tekstilne tvornice Mautner D.D.") with its headquarters in Ljubljana from 1923..

Isidor Mautner also founded new companies, including the "Vereenigde Textiel Maatschappijen Mautner N.V." in Amsterdam in 1923, the Belgrade Textile Works AG ("Beogradska Tekstilna Industrija A.D.") a year later, and a cloth factory in Ujpest, Hungary, in 1926.

Isidor Mautner lost the majority in his companies due to continued share increases of the Bodenkreditanstalt. In addition, the "Neue Wiener Bankgesellschaft AG," founded in 1921 and managed by his son Stephan, to which he had entrusted his assets, ran into difficulties in 1924. In an attempt o save the company, Isidor Mautner pledged his real estate holdings to the National Bank, but this failed. In 1925, he took a majority stake in the highly indebted textile company Trumau-Marienthal in Lower Austria. This project ultimately failed due to Mautner's lack of liquidity. Mautner was forced out of the management of Textilwerke Mautner AG at the end of 1928, ending his entrepreneurial activity. He died in Vienna on 13 April 1930.

== Honors and legacy ==
Isidor Mautner was one of the great entrepreneurial personalities of the Austro-Hungarian monarchy. With the generously endowed "Mautner Fund," he contributed to the social security of his employees. For his services, he was appointed a Commercial Councillor in 1895, and in 1897 he received the Commander's Cross of the Order of Franz Joseph. In 1907, like his father before him, he became an honorary citizen of Schumburg.

With his wife Jenny, née Neumann, he had four children: Stefan Mautner (1877–1944), Konrad Mautner (1880–1924), Katharina Breuer-Mautner (1883–1979) and Marie Mautner-Kalbeck (1886–1972), who enjoyed an extensive musical education. The family lived for much of the year in the Geymüllerschlössel in the Pötzleinsdorf district of Vienna, purchased in 1888, known as the Mautner Villa. For decades, it served as a meeting place for prominent cultural figures and promising talents. Isidor Mautner was also an important promoter of Viennese theater life. He was a friend of the Burgschauspieler Josef Kainz, played a major role in financing the Theater in der Josefstadt, newly opened by Max Reinhardt in 1924, and was president of the "Wiener Schauspielhaus AG" from 1924 to 1928.

After Hitler's Anschluss of Austria in 1938, Mautner's heirs lost all citizenship rights due to their Jewish heritage.

== Literature ==
- Wolfgang Hafer, Die anderen Mautners: Das Schicksal einer jüdischen Unternehmerfamilie. Hentrich & Hentrich, Berlin 2014, ISBN 978-3-95565-061-2.
- Reinhard Müller, Marienthal: Das Dorf – Die Arbeitslosen – Die Studie. Studienverlag Innsbruck 2008, ISBN 978-3-7065-4347-7
- Karl Brousek: Die Großindustrie Böhmens. Munich 1987
- Ernst Oberhummer, Die Baumwollindustrie Österreich-Ungarns, Vienna 1917
- Isaac Mautner & Sohn, in Leopold Weis (ed.), Die Grossindustrie Österreichs IV, Wien 1898, pp. 250–252
- Josef Gruntzel, "Die österreichische Textilindustrie", in Leopold Weis (ed.), Die Gross-Industrie Österreichs IV, Vienna 1898, pp. 193–203

== Enternal links ==
Biography Isidor Mautner
