= Robert Russ (painter) =

Austrian painter (1847–1922)

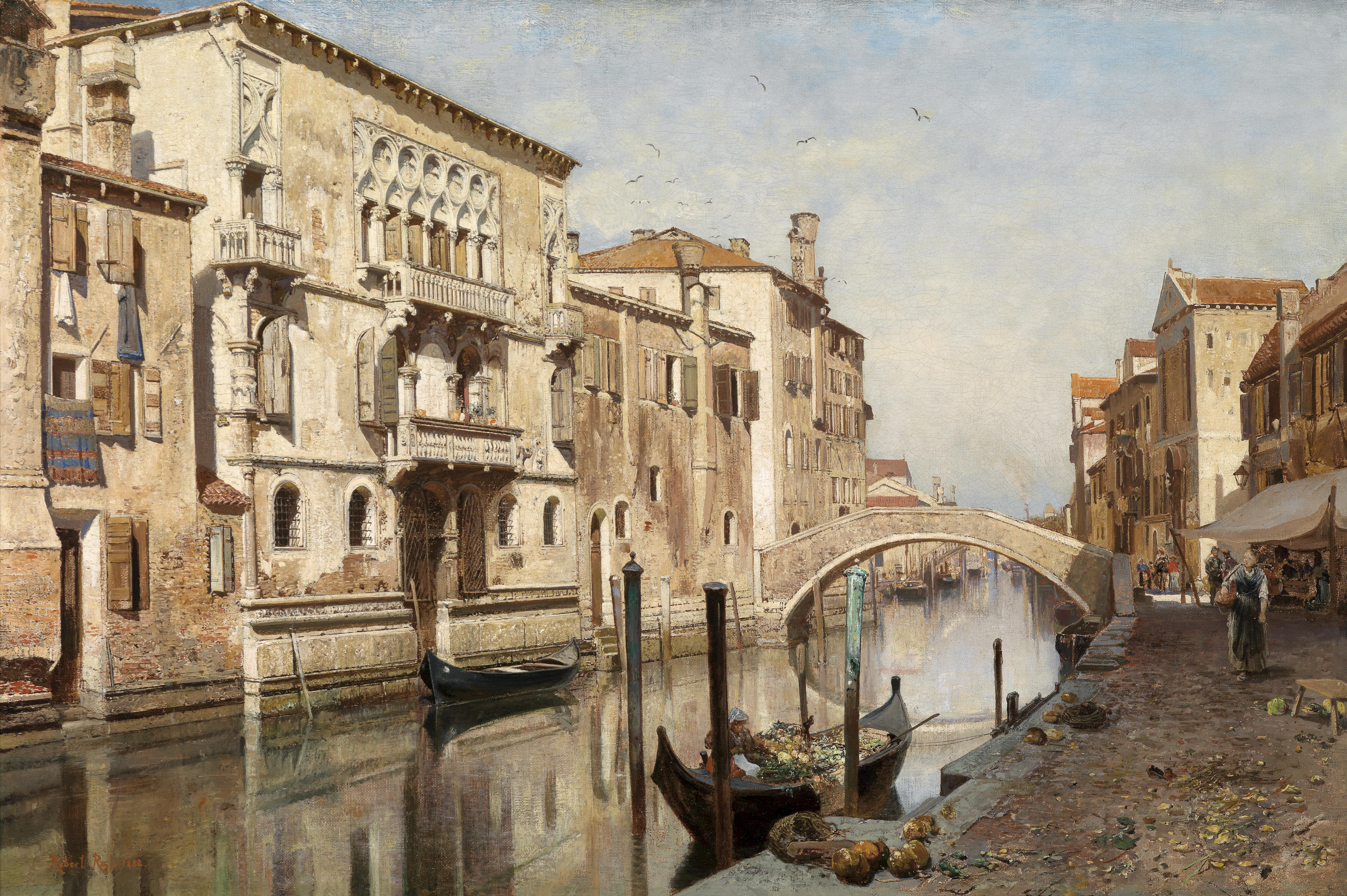
Palazzo Del Cammello, 1882

Robert Russ (1847 – 1922) was an Austrian painter.

== Biography ==
Russ was born into a family of painters in 1847 in Vienna. He studied at the Academy of Fine Arts Vienna under Albert Zimmermann, who led the department of landscape art. Russ later taught landscape painting at the academy and was, in 1888, elected an honorary member of the Academy. He heavily influenced Austrian landscape painting toward the end of the 19th century, painting primarily Austrian and Italian landscapes. He died in Vienna in 1922.

== Selected paintings ==
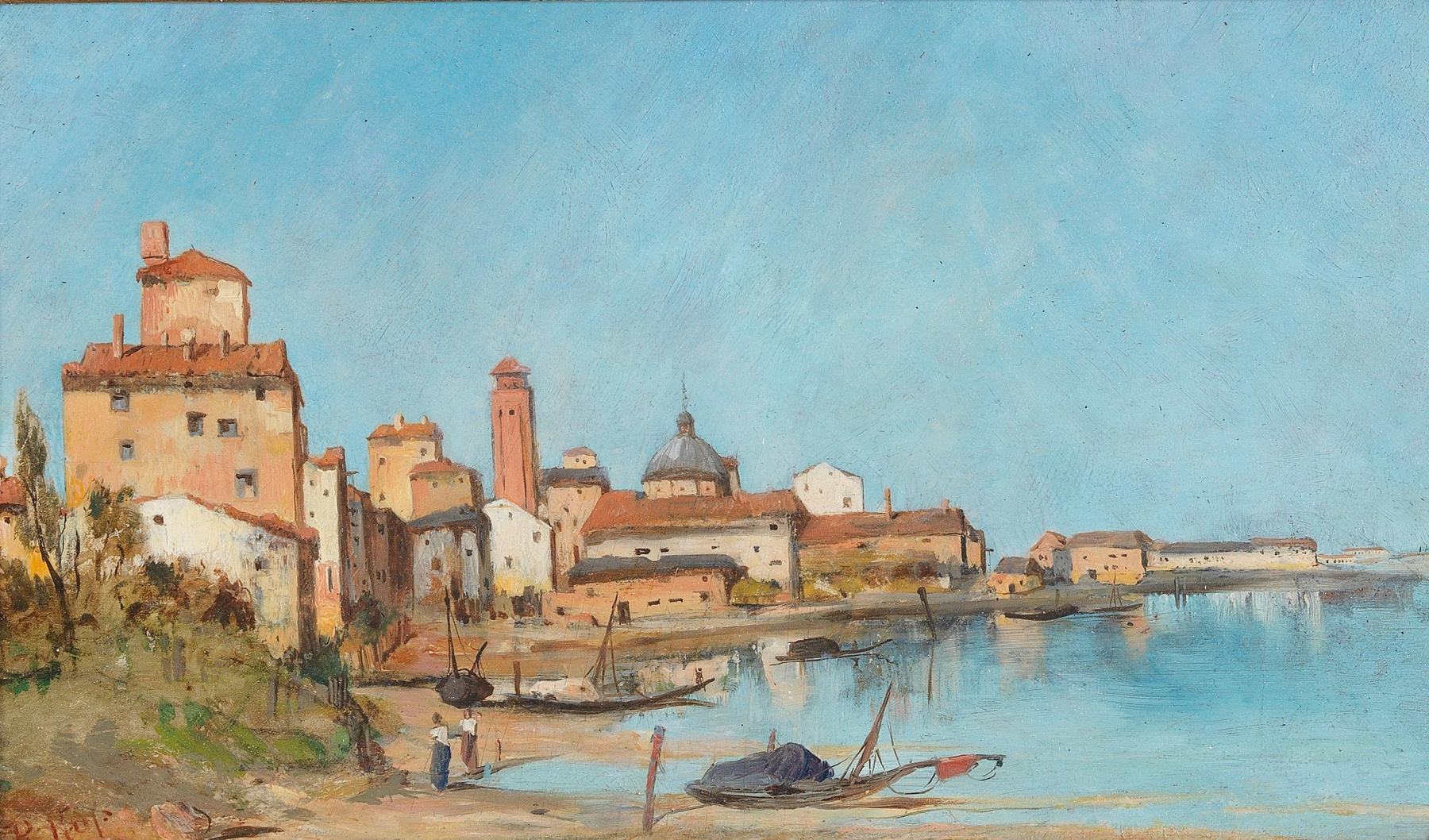
San Giovanni Venezia

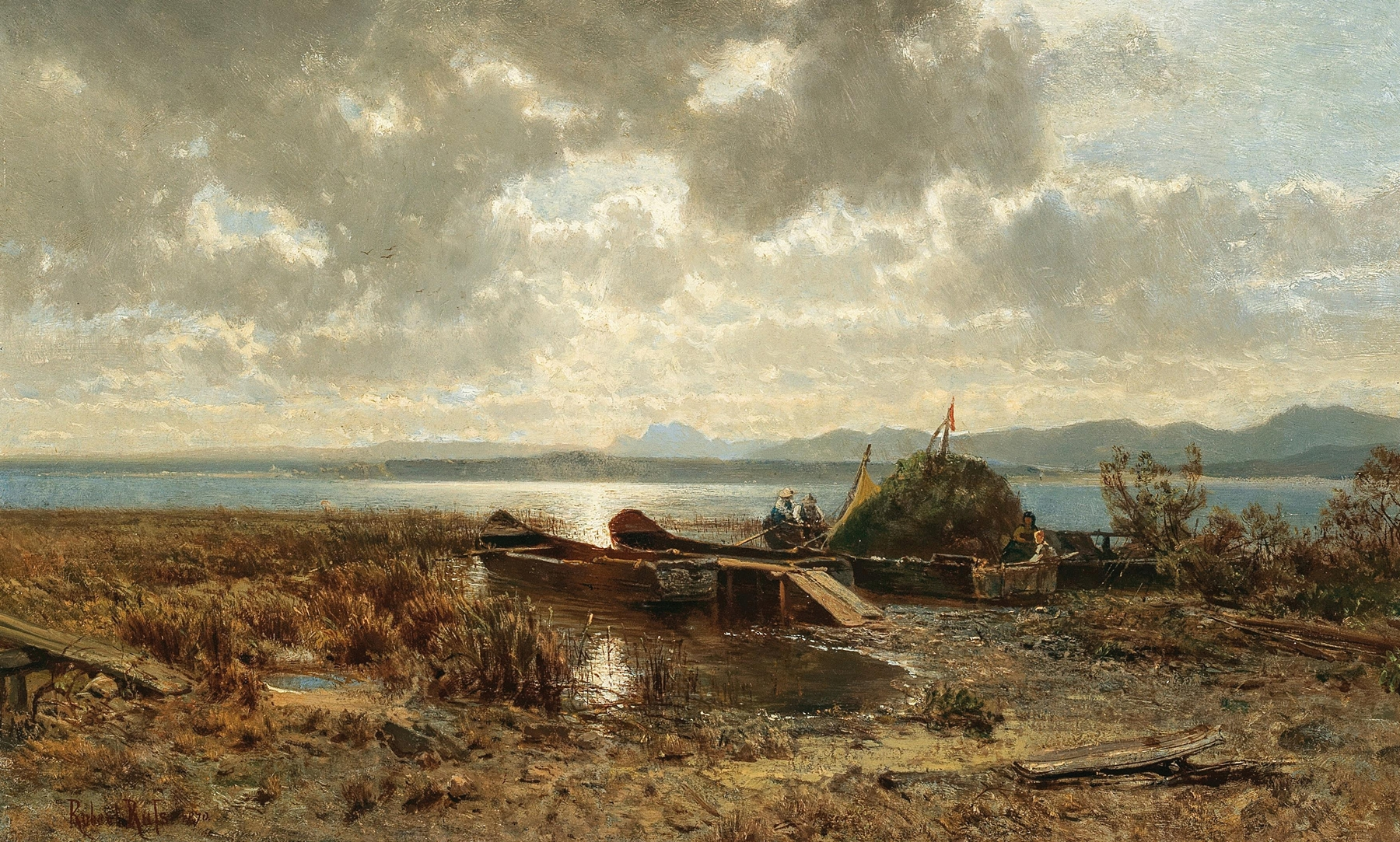
Lake Chiemsee in the Evening (1870)

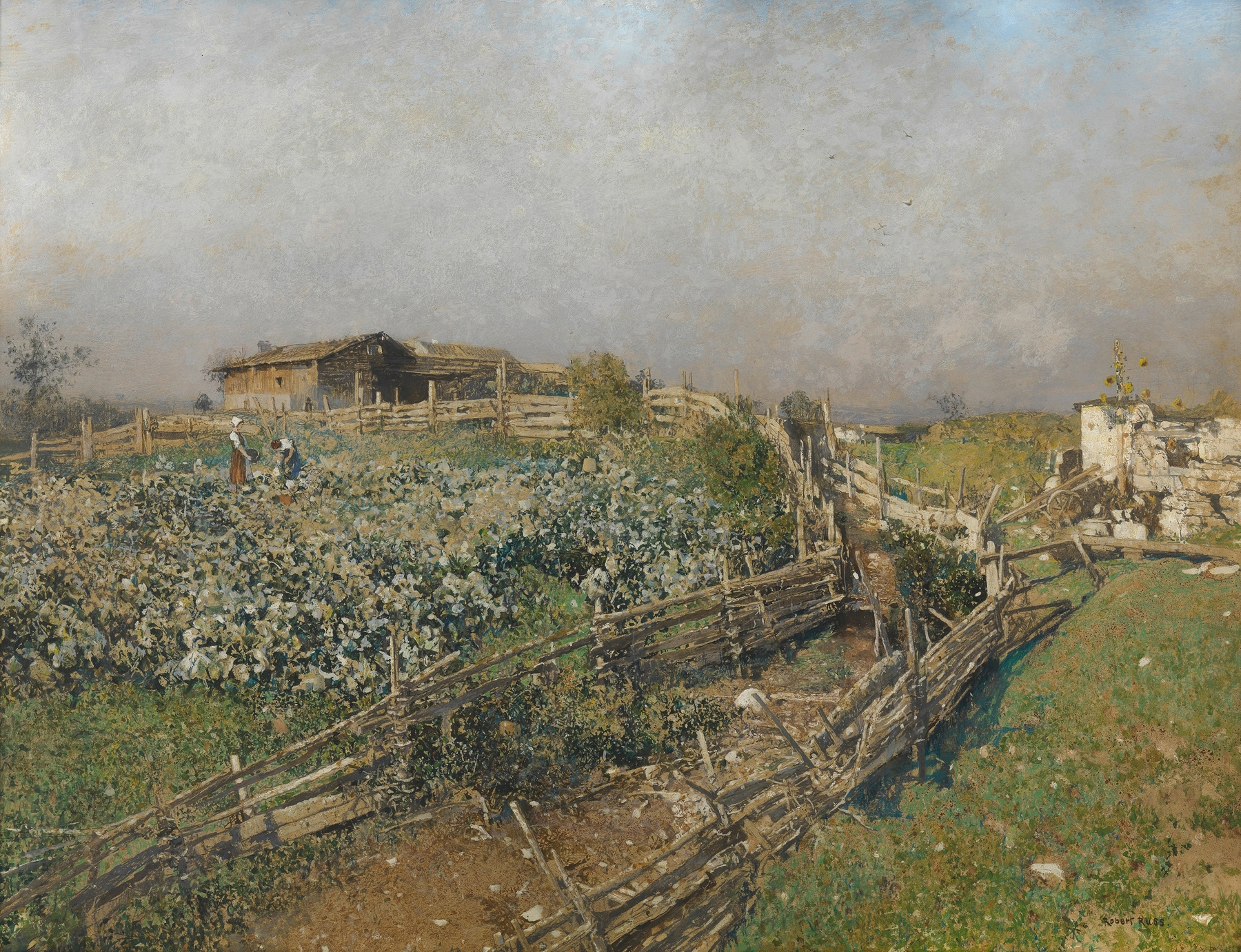
Landschaft bei Plankensteig in Oberösterreich

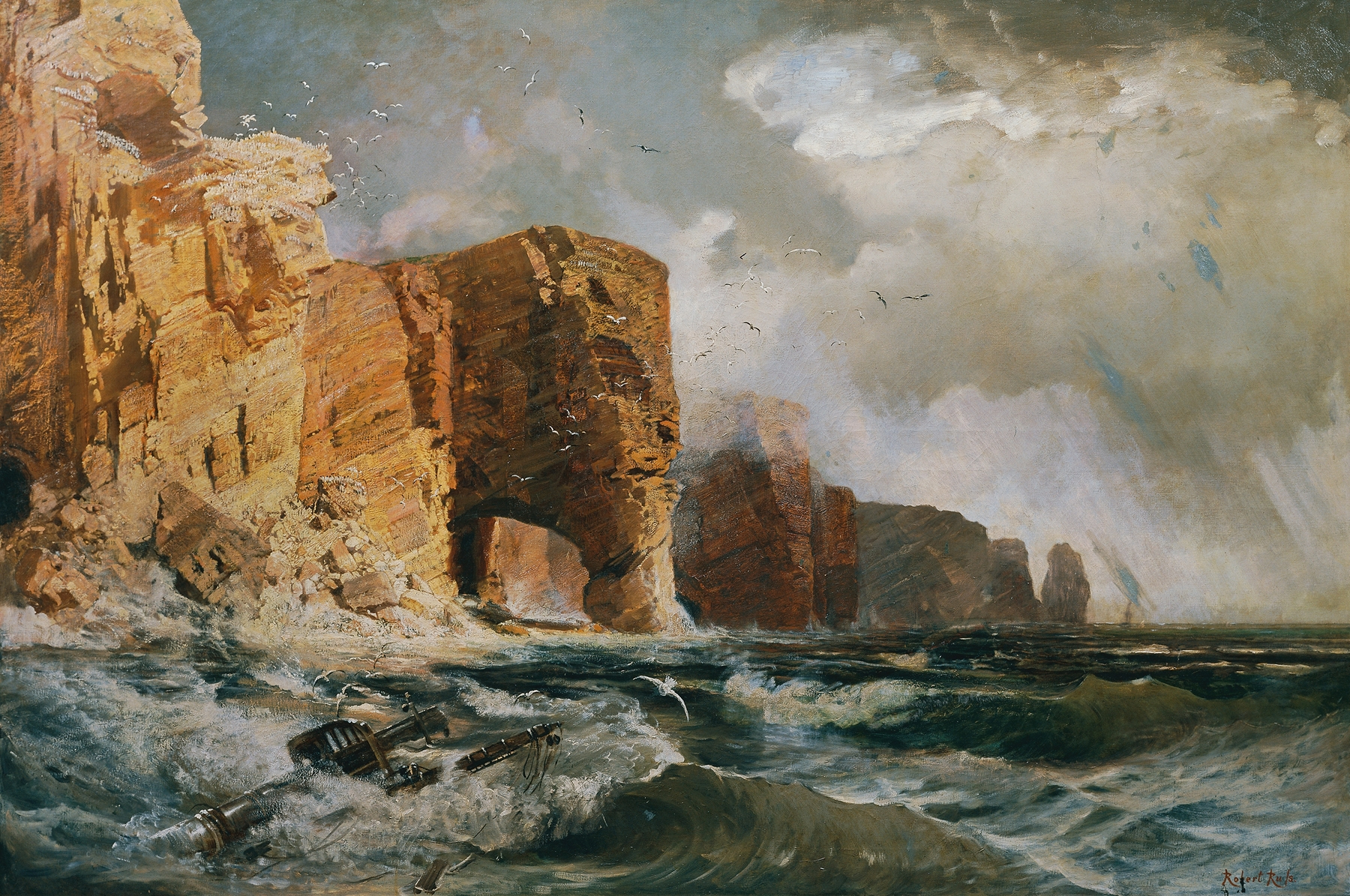
Helgoland (1877)

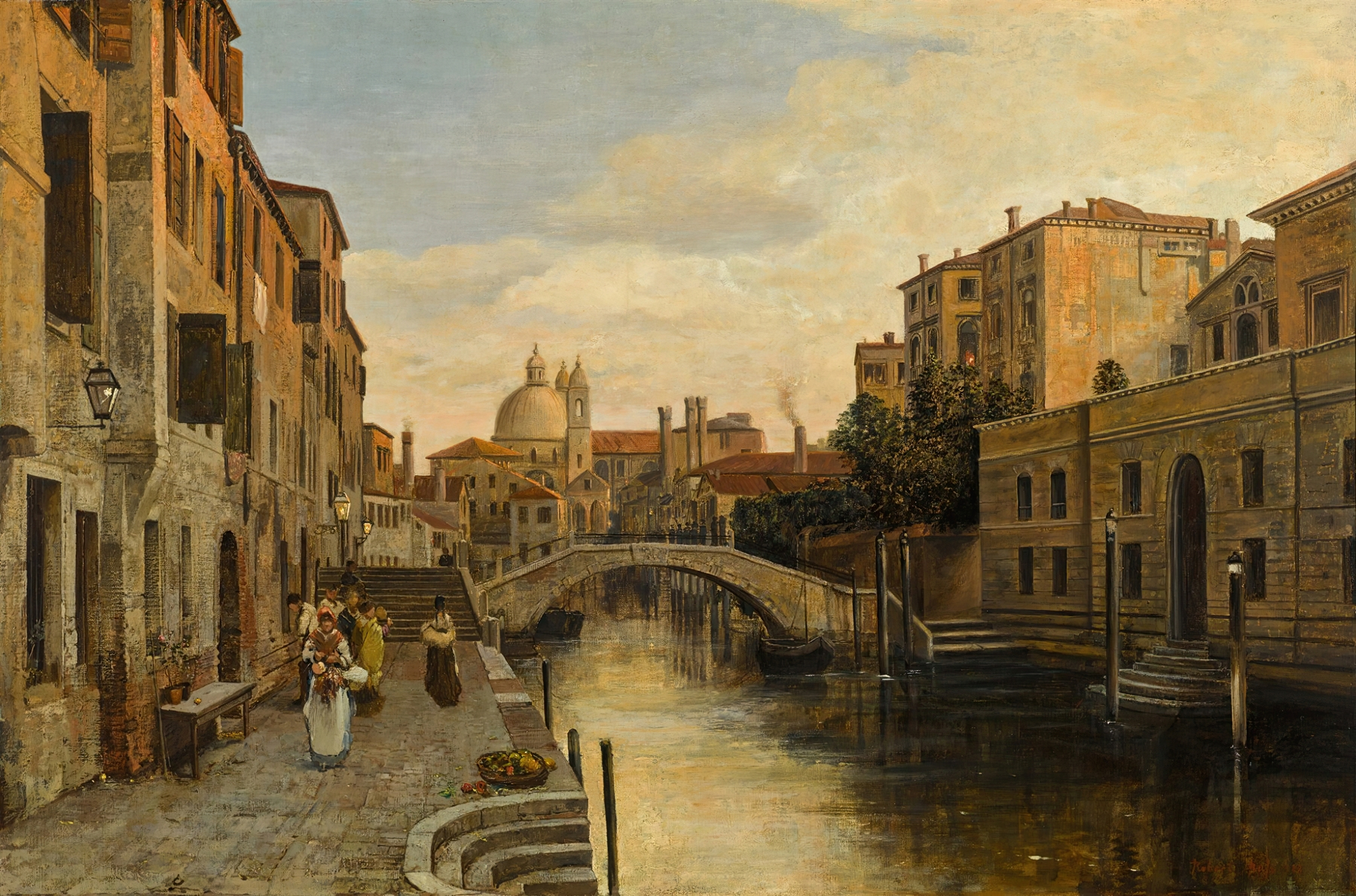
Rio del Ognissanti, Venice (1882)

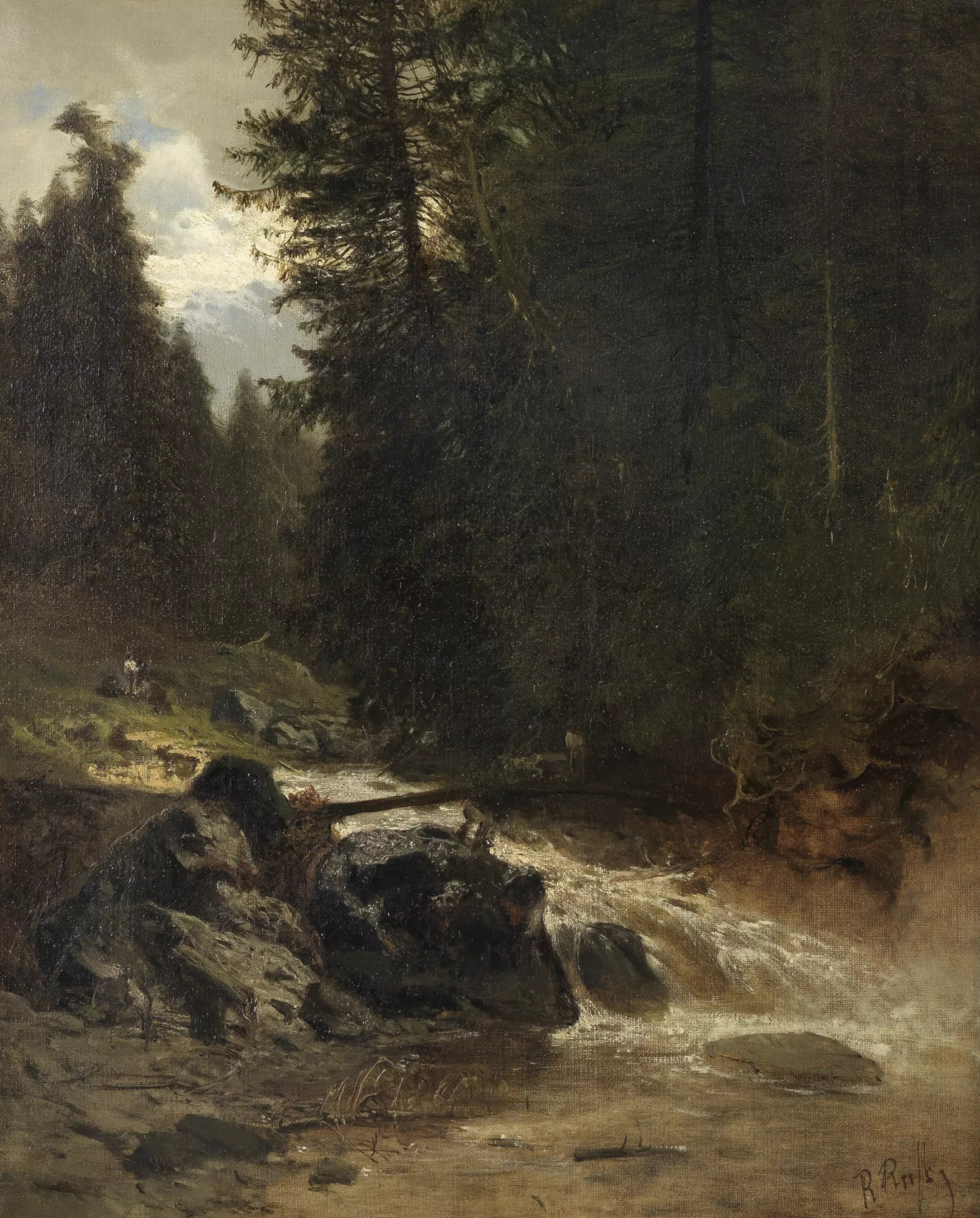
Wild Stream (1870)

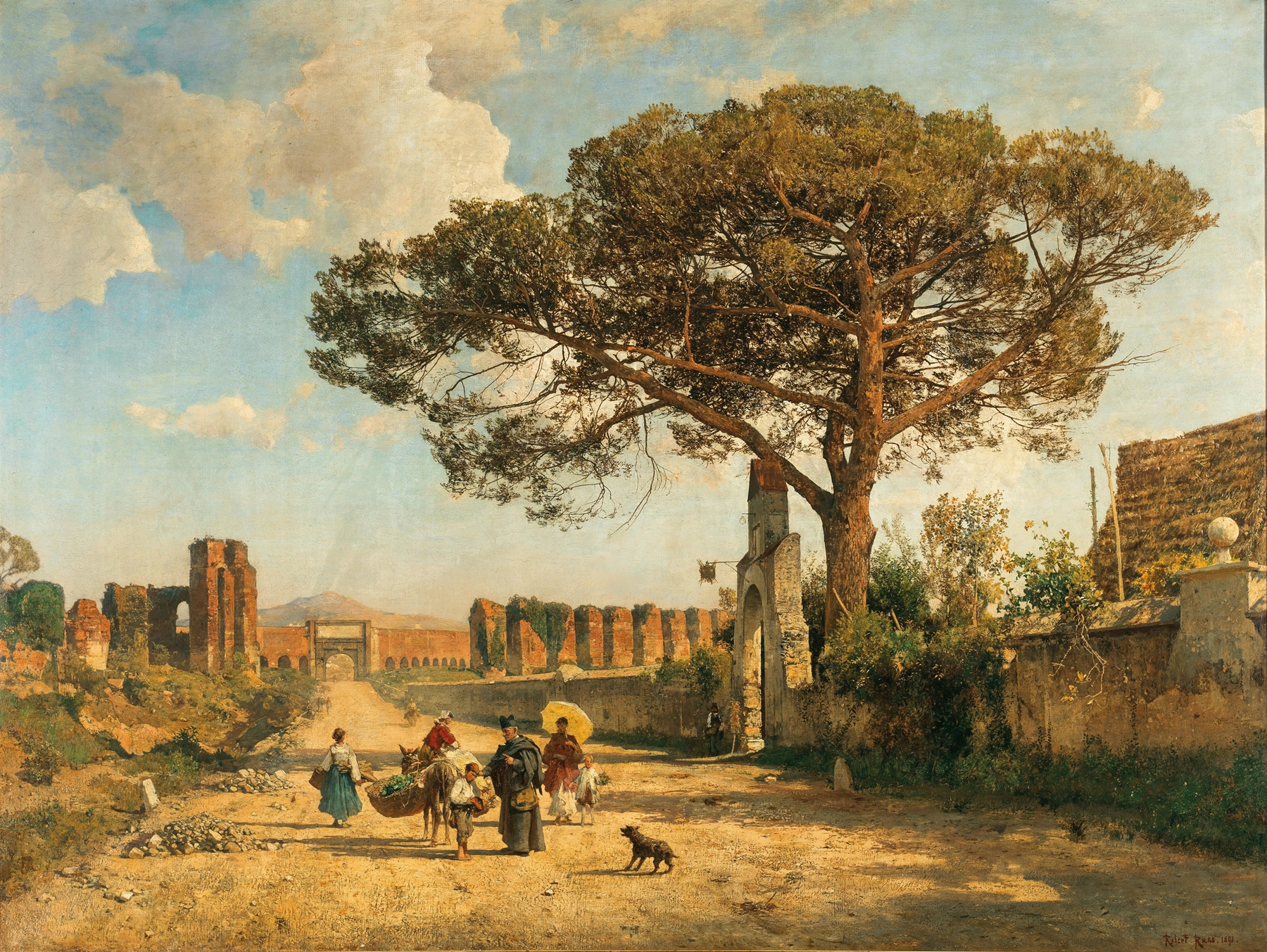
Porta Furba on the Road to Frascati, Rome (1891)

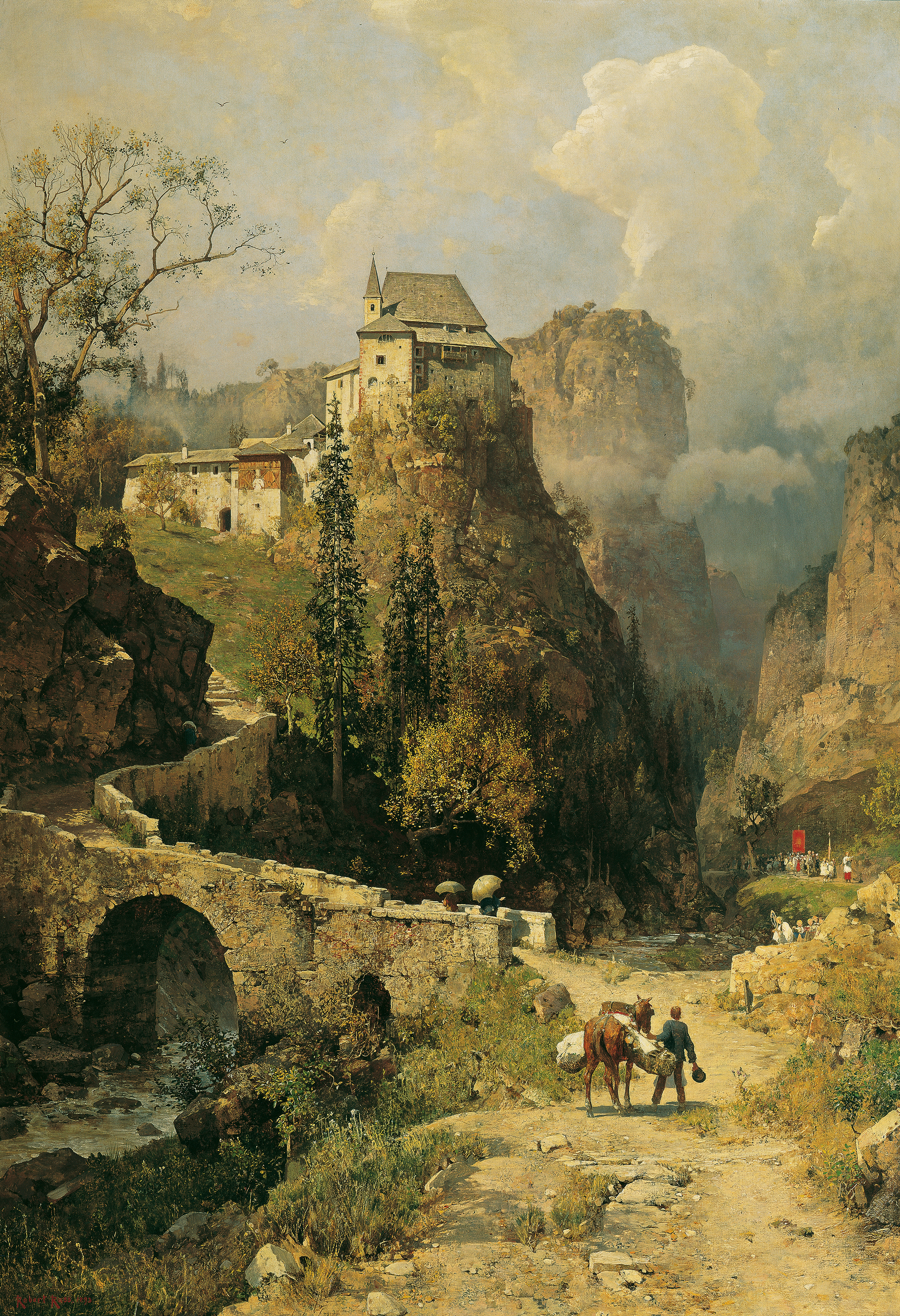
Schlucht und Einsiedelei San Romedio bei Val di Non (1893)

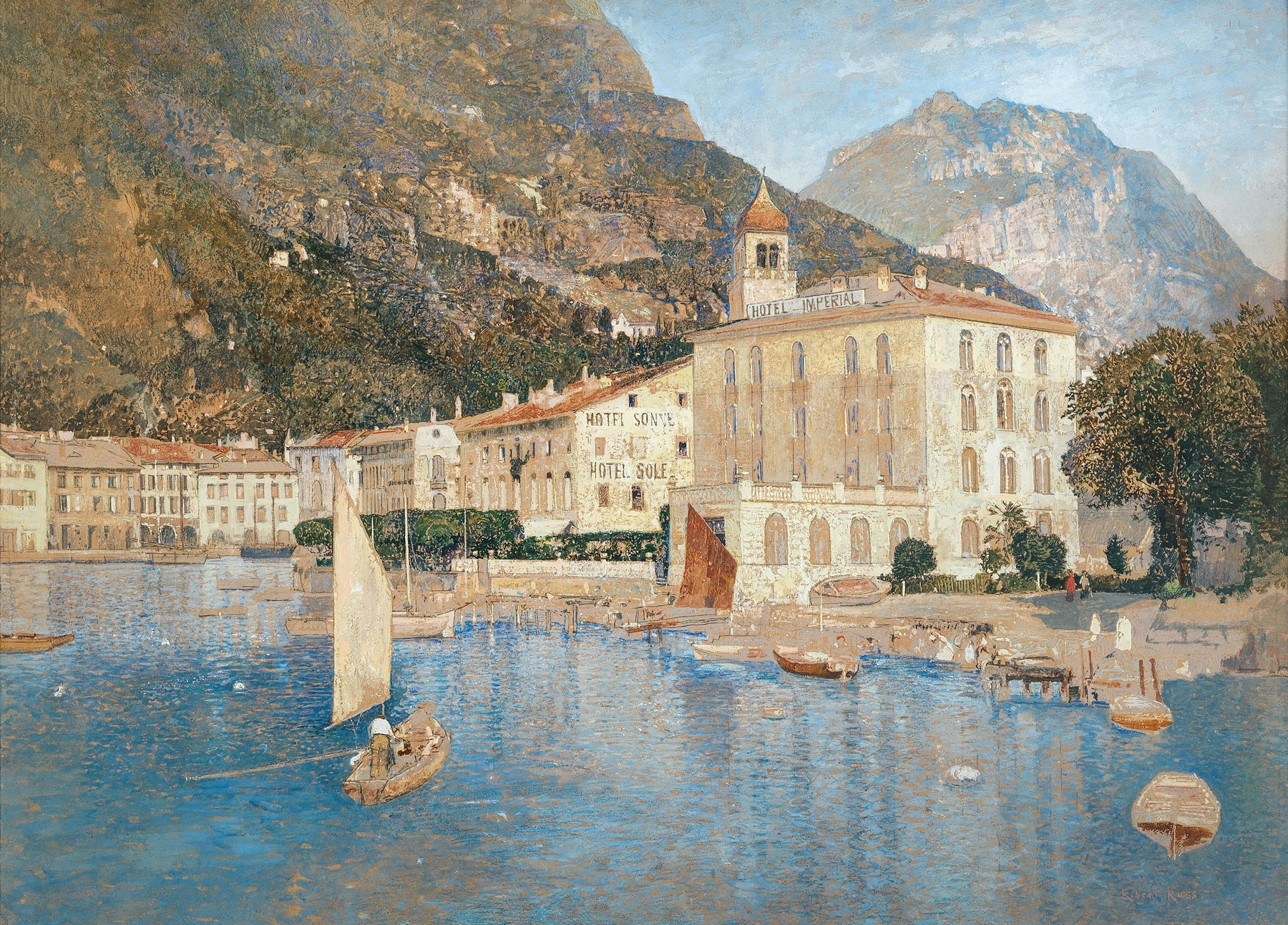
The Harbour of Riva on Lake Garda (1912)

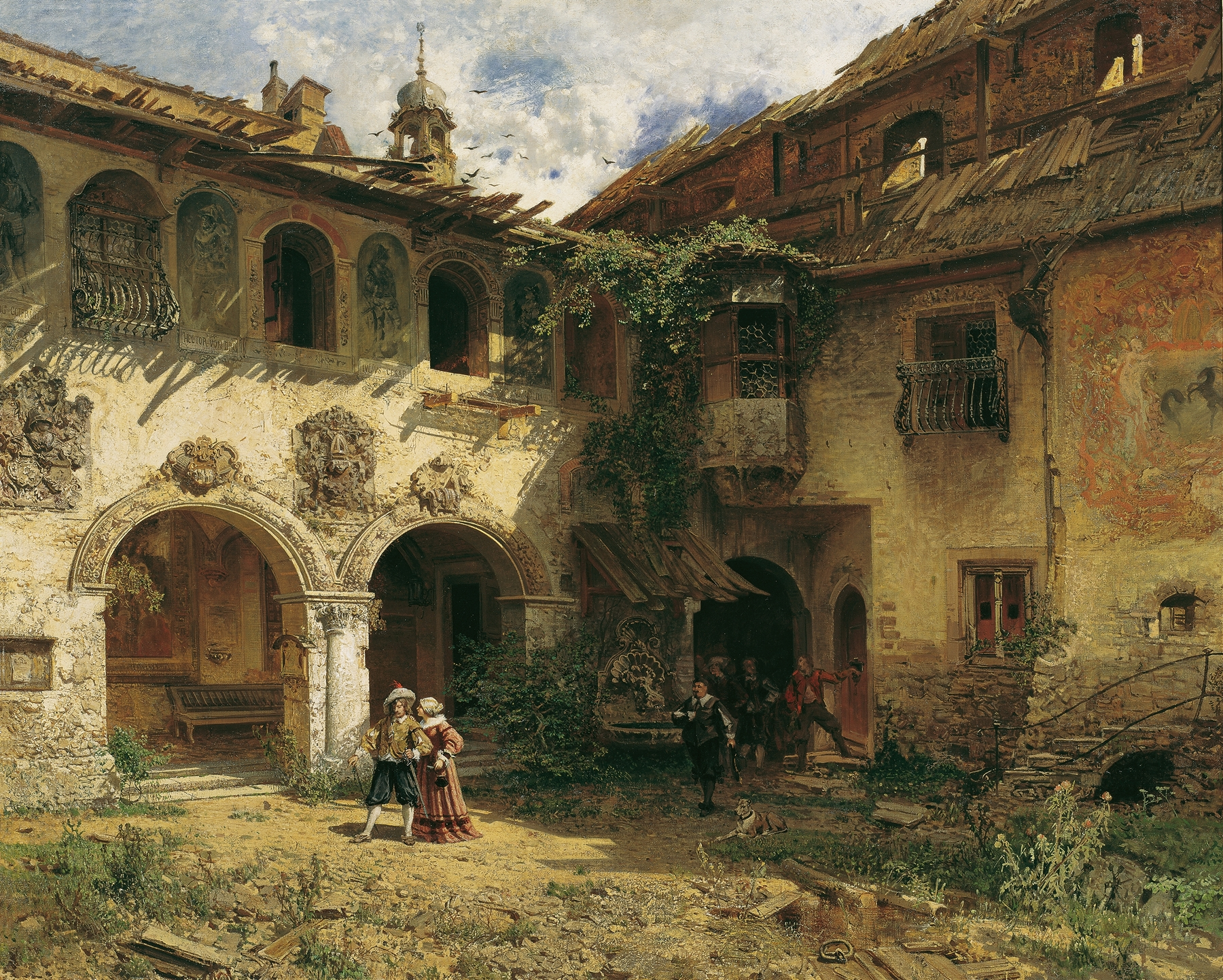
Hof der Fürstenburg in Burgeis
