= Hotel Imperial =

Luxury hotel in Vienna, Austria

Coordinates: 48°12′04″N 16°22′23″E

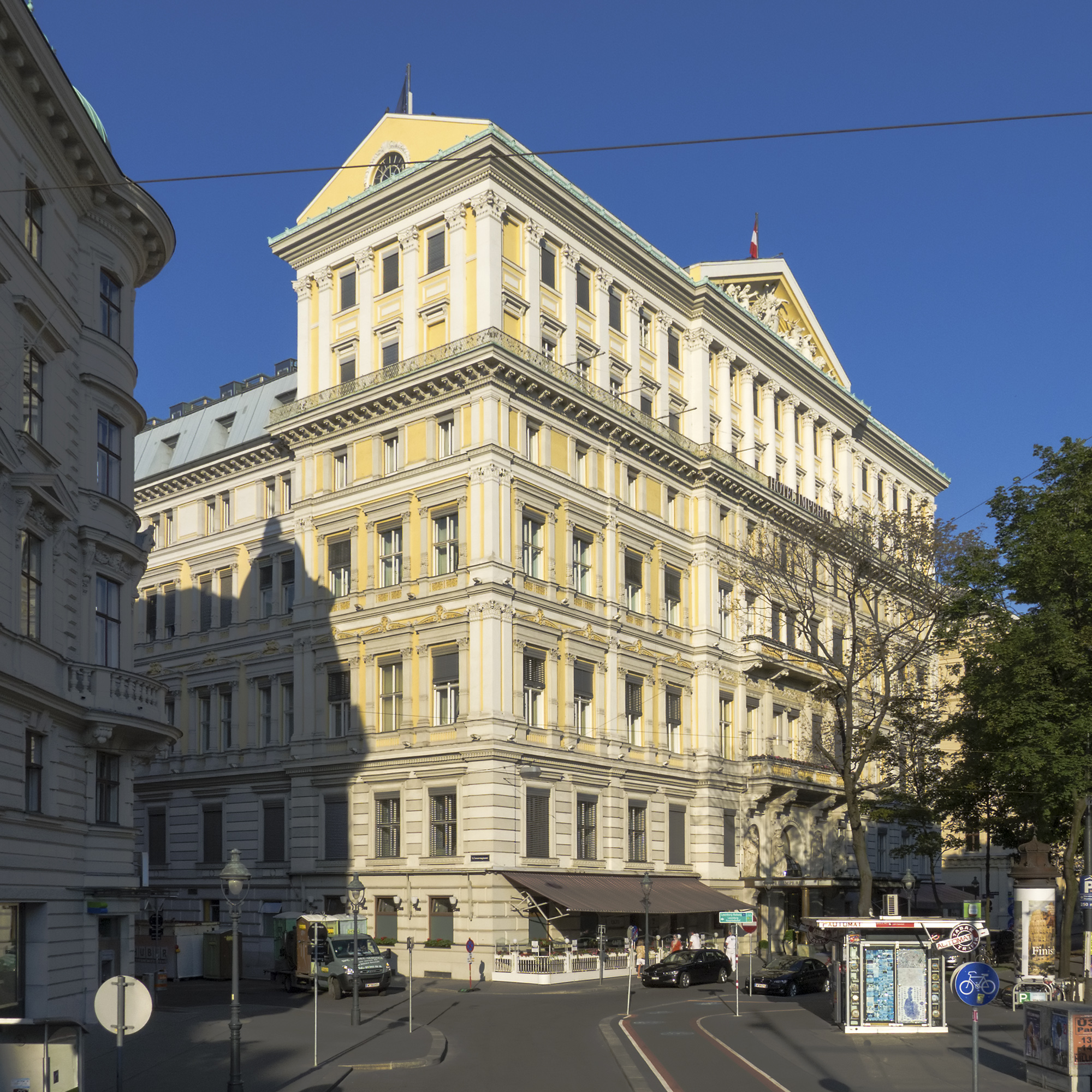
- Interactive map of the Hotel Imperial area
- Hotel chain: The Luxury Collection

General information
- Type: Luxury hotel
- Classification: _{Superior}
- Location: Kärntner Ring 16; Vienna, Austria
- Opened: 28 April 1873
- Owner: Al Habtoor Investment
- Operator: Marriott International

Design and construction
- Architect: Arnold Zenetti
- Developer: Heinrich Adam

Other information
- Number of rooms: 79
- Number of suites: 59

Website
- www.imperialvienna.com

The Hotel Imperial, also known as The Imperial, is a five-star superior hotel in Vienna, Austria. It is located on the Vienna Ring Road (Ringstraße) at Kärntner Ring 16, in the Innere Stadt district. The hotel operates as part of The Luxury Collection, a brand of Marriott International.

== Description ==
The building was originally constructed as the Palais Württemberg. Its façade was designed in the Italian Neo-Renaissance style, with the main front facing the Ringstraße. The composition includes a projecting central section, balconies and a high entrance portal that formerly served as the carriage entrance to the palace courtyard. Four portal figures by the sculptor Franz Melnitzky represent the virtues of wisdom, honour, justice and strength. Above the façade, sculptural decoration includes heraldic animals associated with the Württemberg coat of arms.

The hotel's interior retains several elements from its nineteenth-century palace phase. The main staircase, once reserved for the household and guests of Duke Philipp of Württemberg, is described in architectural accounts as one of the notable staircases of Vienna's Ringstraße architecture. Marriott describes the interior as including marble, hand-carved statues and crystal chandeliers, while the current hotel has 79 rooms and 59 suites.

== History ==
The building was commissioned as a city palace for Duke Philipp of Württemberg and his wife, Duchess Marie Therese, born Archduchess of Austria. It was built between 1863 and 1865 to designs by Arnold Zenetti, with Heinrich Adam engaged as master builder. The palace stood at Kärntner Ring 16, close to the newly developed Ringstraße, whose construction followed the demolition of Vienna's former city walls.

Philipp of Württemberg and his wife made limited use of the residence. According to Burgen-Austria, changes to the surrounding urban plan, including the construction of Lothringerstraße and the separation of the palace from its garden, contributed to the duke's decision to leave the property. In 1872, the Palais Württemberg was purchased by the financier Horace Ritter von Landau, who had it converted into a hotel before the 1873 Vienna World's Fair. The Hotel Imperial opened in April 1873; Marriott gives the ceremonial opening date as 28 April 1873.

During the late nineteenth and early twentieth centuries, the hotel was used by members of royal families, diplomats and public figures visiting Vienna. Burgen-Austria records that, under Emperor Franz Joseph I, it served as an official guest house of the emperor and hosted, among others, Pedro II of Brazil, Christian IX of Denmark, William I and Otto von Bismarck. The building was increased by two storeys in 1928, a change that enlarged the hotel while preserving much of its earlier palace character.

Before the Second World War, the Imperial was partly owned by Samuel Schallinger, who was forced to give up his shares after the Anschluss in 1938. He was deported to Theresienstadt, where he died in 1942. During the Nazi period, Adolf Hitler stayed at the Hotel Imperial during visits to Vienna, and a bunker was built on the Canovagasse side of the property. In the final days of the war, Generaloberst Josef Dietrich directed the withdrawal of German troops from Vienna from the hotel.

From 1945 to 1955, during the Allied occupation of Austria, the building housed the Soviet High Commission for Austria. After the signing of the Austrian State Treaty, the former palace was returned to the Republic of Austria, and the hotel was renovated between 1956 and 1958 before resuming hotel operations. Later renovations included works between 1988 and 1994 and further changes to the ground floor in the 2010s.

In 2016, Starwood Hotels & Resorts sold the Hotel Imperial to Al Habtoor Investment, the investment arm of the Al Habtoor Group. The hotel continued to operate under The Luxury Collection brand through a long-term management agreement.

== Imperial Torte ==
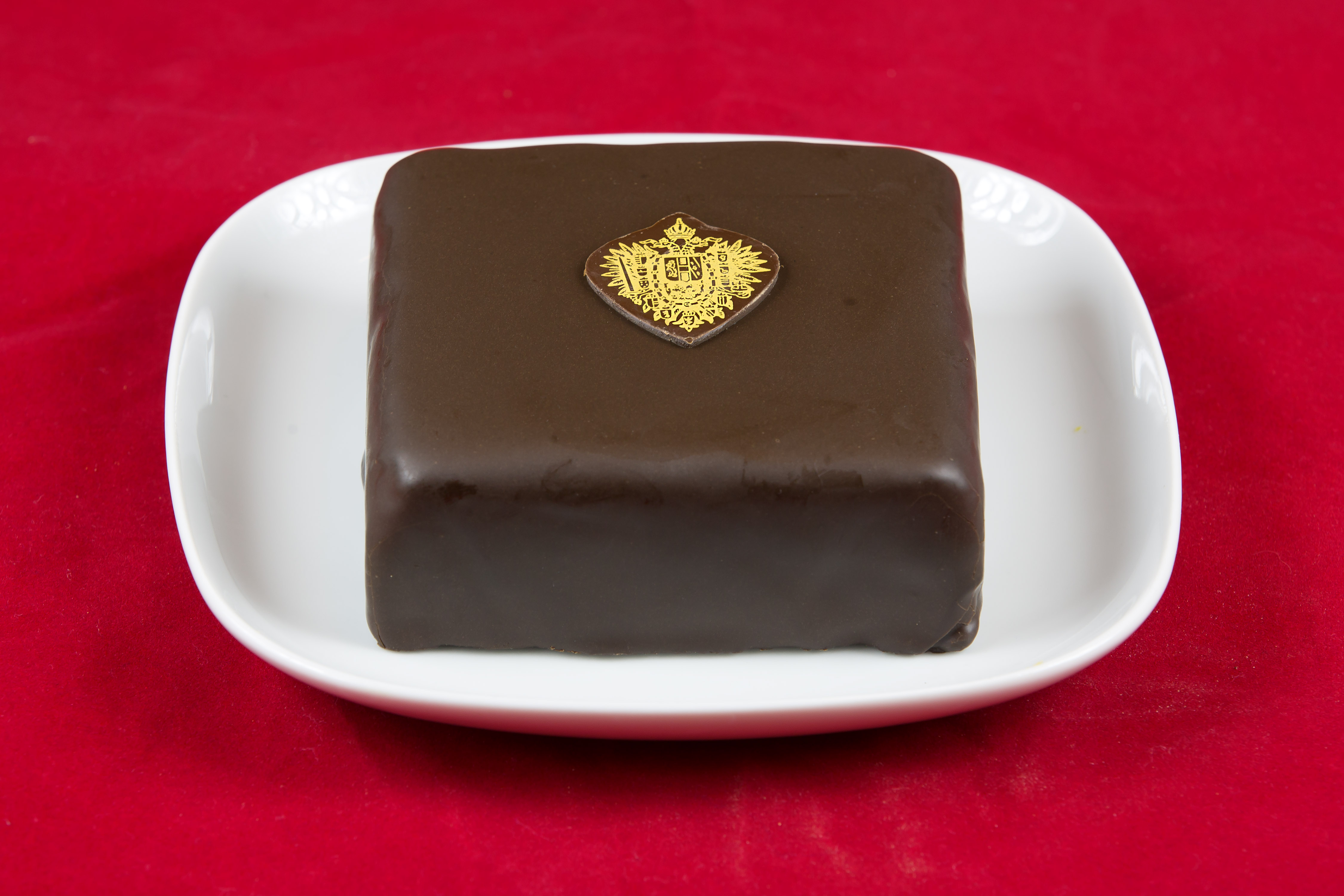
Imperial Torte on a plate

A speciality associated with the hotel is the Imperial Torte, a square confection made with chocolate, almonds, cocoa cream and marzipan. According to the hotel's own tradition, the torte was created in 1873 by the kitchen apprentice Xaver Loibner for Emperor Franz Joseph I on the occasion of the hotel's opening. The story is presented by the producer as a legend rather than as an independently documented historical event.
