= Kniže & Comp. =

Clothing store in Innere Stadt, Austria

Coordinates: 48°12′30.6″N 16°22′11″E

Kniže & Comp. „C.M. Frank“ GmbH
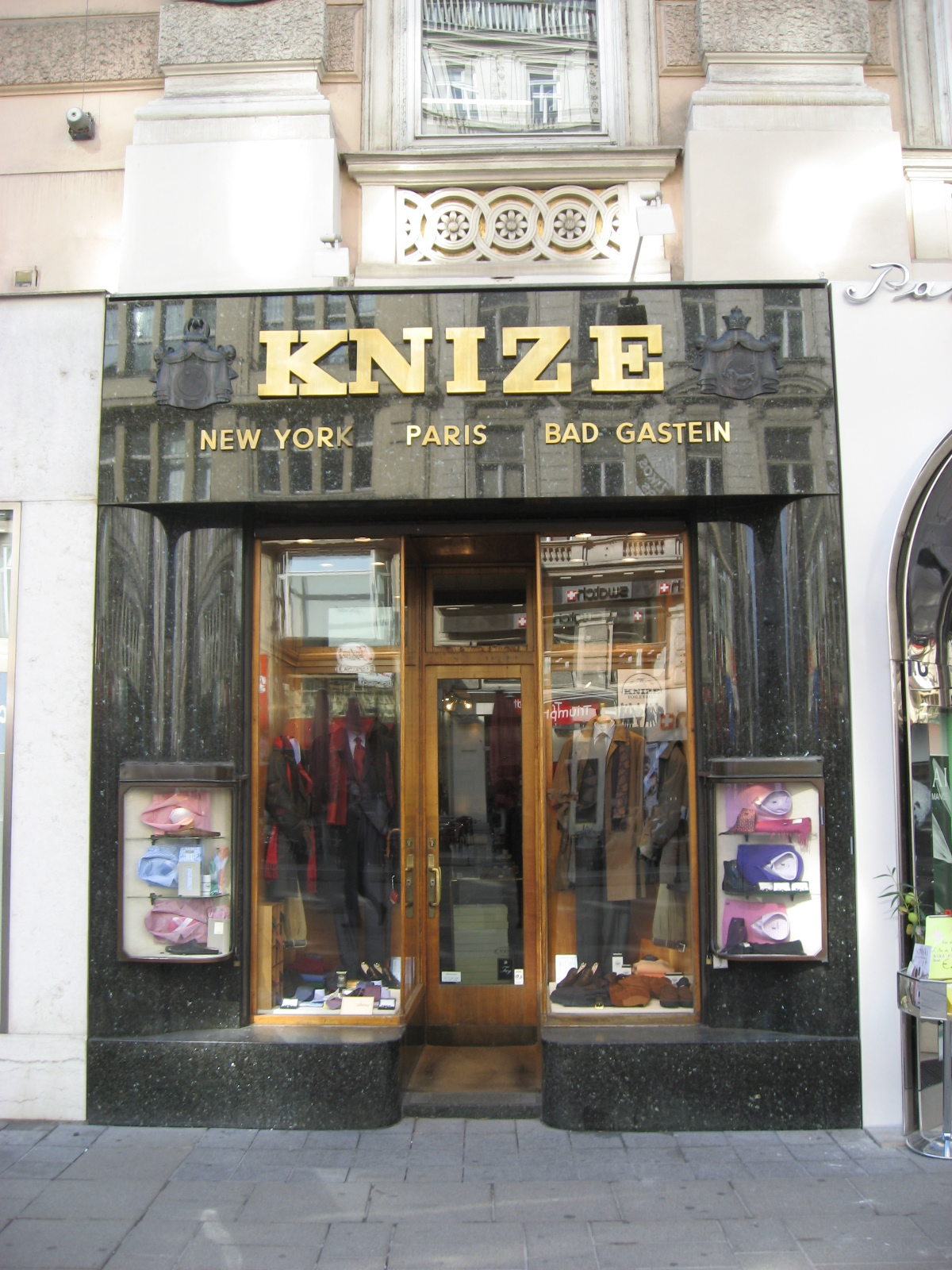
- Kniže & Comp. store on Wiener Graben
- Headquarters: Austria
- Website: www.knize.at

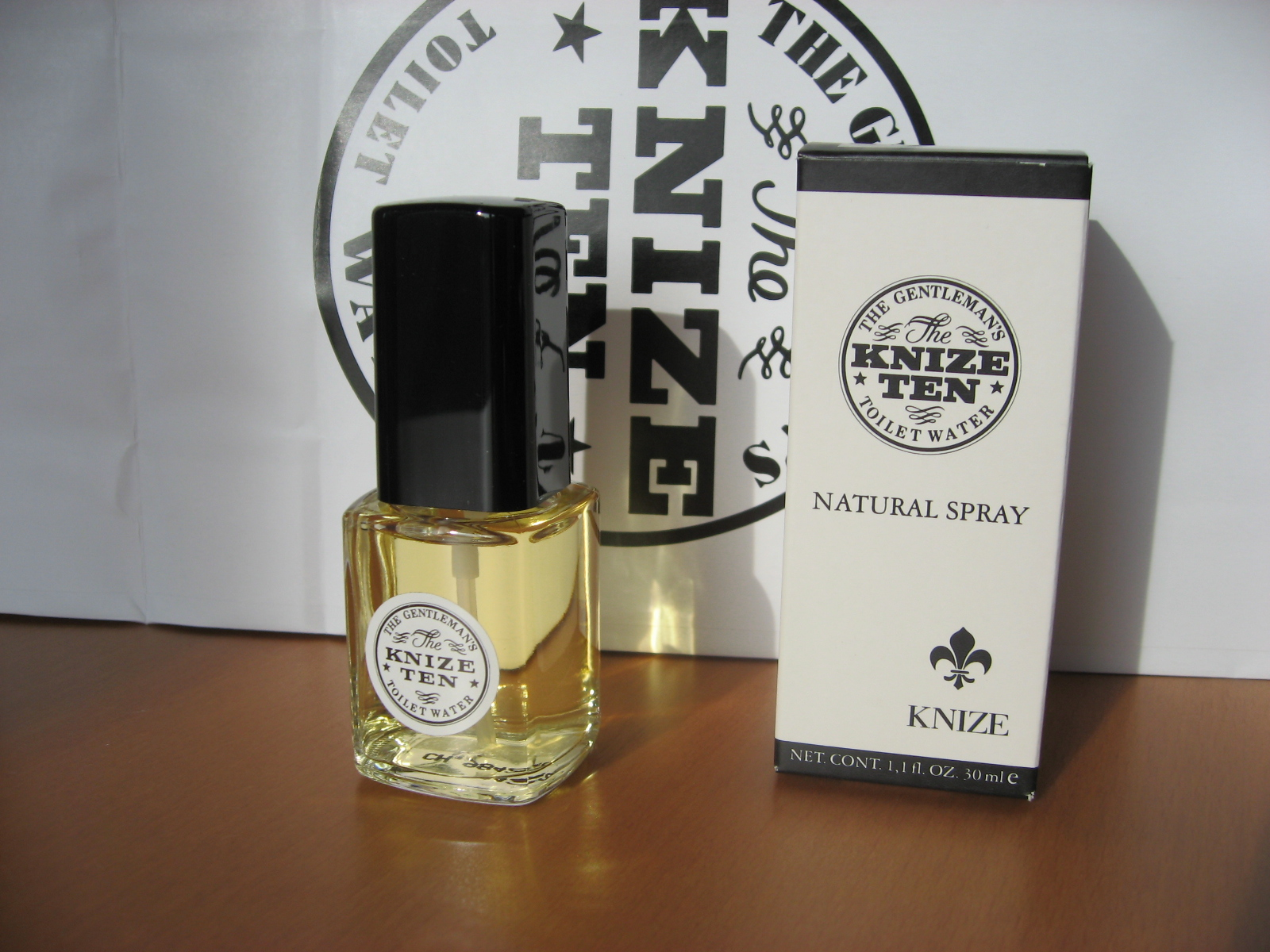
Knize Ten fragrance for men

Kniže & Comp. is a men's outfitter from Vienna, considered the first men's fashion brand in the world. The first men's fragrance series "Knize Ten" was also created by the traditional house.

== History ==
=== Early years ===
Kniže was founded in 1858 by the Czech tailor Josef Kniže. He specialized in making sportswear, riding clothes and liveries. After his death in 1880, his son Josef Jr. (1851–1888) together with Johann Kallina took over the store, which was then located at Am Hof 3. In 1885, Albert Wolff, who came from Neumarkt in Pomerania, joined the company.

In 1873, Kniže was awarded the "Progress Medal" at the Vienna World's Fair. From 1874 he was allowed to use the Persian as well as the Ottoman court title. His customers included the Dukes of Mecklenburg and Oldenburg, Prince Liechtenstein, and the Jockey Club.

In 1886, Kniže applied for the title of Viennese court supplier, but was refused. It was not until 1888 that Kniže received the title of "k.k. Court Tailor." Josef Kniže died in the same year, and Albert Wolff became sole proprietor. After his death in 1902, his widow Gisela and their four children Anna, Auguste, Fritz and Susanna took over the business. From 1904, the company was called Kniže & Comp. Since the court title was personal, she had to apply for the title again and pay the tax.

The creative birth of the traditional brand took place in the age of the Belle Époque. In 1910–1913, the current store at Graben 13, one of the most famous Viennese business streets in the city center, was designed by architect Adolf Loos and remains almost unchanged to this day. Loos also designed the branch in Karlovy Vary (1921), the store on Wilhelmstrasse in Berlin (1924) and the annex at 149 Champs-Élysées in Paris (1927–1928). The Prague branch was designed by his collaborator Heinrich Kulka.

In his work Wittgenstein's Nephew, Thomas Bernhard describes a scene in Karlovy Vary when Paul Wittgenstein had two tailcoats made for him by Kniže.

In 1915 a lingerie production was introduced and from 1922 a retail trade for men. In 1922, the Wolff family was able to recruit Ernst Dryden as an advertising consultant. With his help, Kniže became one of the top addresses in the fashion world. He transferred the image of polo to Kniže Ten products, an exclusive range of toiletries for men. The number 10 is the highest handicap in the game of polo.

Another branch was opened in Bad Gastein in 1937.

=== Nazi era ===
In 1935, the Wolff family changed the name of the company, owned by Frederic ("Fritz") Wolff-Knize, to Wolff-Knize. With Austria's Anschluss with the Nazi Third Reich in 1938, the family was persecuted as Jews. They emigrated first to Paris, then to New York. Once there, the name was changed to Knize and, in 1941 a store was established In New York on 56th Street. Old customers, also forced to emigrate, again formed the regular clientele and remained loyal to the company.

In the meantime, from 1939 to 1945, the Viennese company was run as Kniže & Co. Kommanditgesellschaft managed by the employees. During the war the store on Wilhelmstraße in Berlin was destroyed.

=== Postwar ===
In the post-war period, Kniže lost its branches in Karlovy Vary and Prague due to the Soviet Union's "Iron Curtain".

In 1972, the Paris branch had to be closed, and in 1974 the branch in New York. From 1976 the former trainee Rudolf Niedersüß from Upper Austria took a share in the company, in 1978 his company C. M. Frank, also a former k.u.k. court supplier, merged with Kniže & Comp. A women's collection was introduced.

In 1984, Kniže opened a store for men's clothing in Bräunerstrasse, and in 1989 the store on Graben was expanded.

From 1992 to 1993, architect and designer Professor Paolo Piva renovated the second floor and the historic Loos salons. The neighboring former Krey bookstore was adapted into the new ladies' store. At the same time, the eldest son Bernhard Niedersüß joined the company. In 2012, a branch was reopened in Prague.

== Famous clients ==
Among the most prominent international clients was Mohammad Reza Pahlavi, the last Shah of Persia and a member of the Pahlavi dynasty. To this day, the storefront of the company's Vienna headquarters displays his coat of arms as a sign of this exclusive relationship.

Artists in particular were Kniže's customers in earlier times. For example, Oskar Kokoschka paid for his suits with paintings, blouses were made for Marilyn Monroe, shirts for Kurt Tucholsky, ski pants for Josephine Baker, and fragrances for James Dean. Marlene Dietrich also had tails tailored at Kniže for her stage shows, and Billy Wilder paid a long visit to the house during his last stay in Vienna. Georgia O'Keeffe had pantsuits tailored for her in the New York store. Customers also included Maurice Chevalier as well as Laurence Olivier, Willi Forst and Fritz Lang, and primarily business leaders and aristocrats such as King Juan Carlos of Spain. The Nazi Gauleiter of Vienna, Baldur von Schirach, was also a customer of the house.

== Literature ==
- Reinhard Engel: Luxus aus Wien I. Czernin Verlag, Wien 2001. ISBN 3-7076-0121-8.
- Ingrid Haslinger: Kunde – Kaiser. Die Geschichte der ehemaligen k. u. k. Hoflieferanten. Schroll, Wien 1996, ISBN 3-85202-129-4.
- János Kalmár, Mella Waldstein: K.u.K. Hoflieferanten Wiens. Stocker, Graz 2001, ISBN 3-7020-0935-3. S. 114–119.
- Oswald M. Klotz: Die Diskretion ist Schneidersache. Knize und Frank: Abglanz alter Zeiten. In: Die Presse. K.u.k. Hoflieferanten heute (IV)/7. Jänner 1977.
- Anna Maria Wallner (3 October 2008). "Bitte zur Anprobe: Maßanzüge aus dem Hause Knize". Die Presse. Der Wiener Herrenausstatter Knize wird 150 Jahre alt. Ein guter Grund, über den Maßanzug nachzudenken, über die Rivalität zwischen Italienern und Briten und über die Rolle von James Bond.
- Anna Maria Wallner (19 October 2008). "Knize: Wechseljahre eines Herrenschneiders". Die Presse. Der Herrenausstatter Knize feiert Anfang November Geburtstag. Eigentümer Rudolf Niedersüß hält Werte wie Tradition und Qualität immer noch hoch, sorgt sich aber um die Zukunft des Hauses.
