= Jewish Trust Corporation =

The Jewish Trust Corporation (JTC) was established in 1950 in the former British zone of occupation in northwest Germany as a Jewish body to pursue claims for the restitution of heirless property of murdered persons and dissolved organizations that had been pursued on racial grounds under the Nazi regime. It was based on the model of the Jewish Restitution Successor Organization, which had been established in the American zone in 1948. By the end of 1967, the JTC had recovered about 169,500,000 DM (approx. $42,375,000), and it finished up its operations by 1980. Many of the JTC's records are held by the Central Archive for the History of the Jewish People.
