= Vugesta =

Nazi looting organization

The Vugesta (also VUGESTAP) for "Vermögens-Umzugsgut von der Gestapo" ("Property Removed by the Gestapo") was a Nazi looting organization in Vienna that from 1940 to 1945 seized the possessions of 5,000–6,000 Viennese Jews. It was a key player in the aryanization of Jewish property, redistributing private property stolen from Jewish Austrians to non-Jewish or Aryan Austrians during the Nazi reign in Austria.

== Creation ==
On August 22, 1940, the Reich Minister of Justice issued a decree to the Reichsverkehrsgruppe Spedition und Lagerei (Reich Transport Group Forwarding and Storage). Jews who fled lost their citizenship and their property was seized and resold. Proceeds went to shipping companies, warehouses and regional tax authorities in Vienna and Berlin.

The Vienna Gestapo founded the VUGESTA to auction off Jewish belongings beginning on September 7, 1940.

Karl Herber managed the Vugesta, headquartered in the "Reichsverkehrsgruppe Spedition und Lagerei / Ostmark" (formerly Central Association of Freight Forwarders for Austria, Vienna 1, Bauernmarkt 24). A collaboration between Austrian freight forwarders, Austrian warehouses and the Gestapo, the Vugesta employed 12 people.

== The Gestapo, the Vugesta and the Dorotheum ==
In the first few years, the VUGESTA concentrated on property stolen from Jews fleeing Nazi terror or deported to camps. Jews were obliged to hand over their packed removal goods (so-called "lifts") to forwarding agents before they left. After the beginning of the Second World War, however, these "lifts" were no longer forwarded, but remained with the freight forwarders or at intermediate stations.

Freight forwarders were also obliged to report on Jewish clients. In these cases, the Vugesta and Gestapo confiscated the property. The looted property was auctioned off through the Dorotheum, in Vienna.

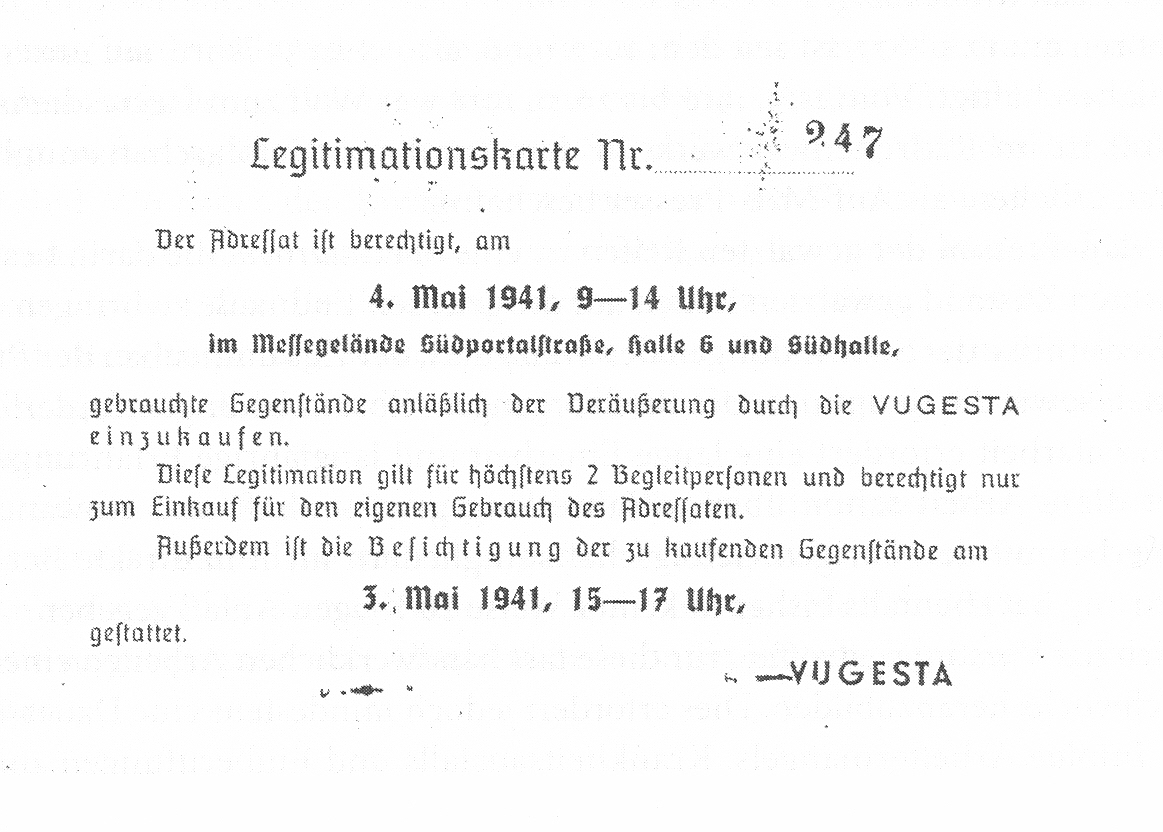
Legitimation card for the Vugesta auction, May 1941

Nazi party members, soldiers and local authorities could purchase the looted property along with war invalids, and people who had lost their homes. The Nazi Party controlled the seizures and the auctions.

By the end of 1943, most of the property looted from Jews had been resold. After that, the Vugesta concentrated on selling off the deported Jews' home furnishings. To this end, the Krummbaumgasse furniture recycling center (headed by Bernhard Witke and Anton Grimm) worked closely with the Central Office for Jewish Emigration initiated by Adolf Eichmann. The appraisers were given addresses and keys to the apartments, which were then cleared by forced laborers.

== Valuables and works of art ==
All artworks and goods with an estimated value of over 1,000 ℛ︁ℳ︁ were auctioned through the Dorotheum- unless the Führer reserved them for himself. Hans Posse, the special representative for the Linz Führer Museum, had first pick. Museums had right of first refusal and purchased many artworks looted from Jews. After that, the Vugesta appraisers such as Bernhard Witke or Anton Grimm, had access. Only when Nazi officers, art dealers and other favorites showed no interest were the goods sold to museums, dealers and private individuals via public auctions.

== Business volume ==
Vugesta's proceeds for the years 1941 and 1944, are estimated at 14 million ℛ︁ℳ︁, of which 10 million ℛ︁ℳ︁ came from the Dorotheum auction house.

From the early autumn of 1940 until the end of the war, the Vugesta seized and sold the belongings of around 5,000 to 6,000 Jews and the home furnishings of at least 10,000 Jewish families who fled or were deported for over five million Reichsmarks. In addition, the Vugesta made a further ten million Reichsmarks by selling items through the Dorotheum auction house. The profit from these sales financed the Nazi Reich.

== Whitewashing theft ==
The legal-looking transactions at the prestigious Dorotheum were used to whitewash the Nazi-looting of the objects sold. In 1997, Oliver Rathkolb described the mechanism in From 'Legacy of Shame' to the Auction of 'Heirless' Art in Vienna: Coming to Terms 'Austrian Style' with Nazi Artistic War Booty in a chapter called "the whitewashing problem"

In her study of Nazi looting of art collections in Vienna (Was einmal war Handbuch der enteigneten Kunstsammlungen Wiens) Sophie Lillie detailed the mechanism by which theft was disguised as repossession for repayment of debt. The Art Newspaper summarized this process in a review of her book:

When a Jew applied to emigrate, in theory only 25% of his goods went to the State. An inventory was submitted and the Zentralstelle für Denkmalschutz decided which works of art were of national importance and these were "made secure", ie; confiscated. It was rare, however, for what was left to be reunited with the owner, who had usually already fled to an unknown destination. Instead, it sat in Nazi-owned warehouses, which sold the goods to pay the "storage charges" that the owner obviously could not cover. A frequent penalty for emigrating was to be stripped of citizenship, and at this point all goods fell to the State, which would sell them as "property of a Jew" through the State-owned auction house, the Dorotheum, or the dealership of VUGESTA, the branch of the Gestapo responsible for the valuation of emigré goods.

== Examples of looting by the Vugesta ==
- The Kraus Family ("When the National Socialist regime deprives all Jews living abroad of their German citizenship, the property of the Kraus family is classified as 'property of the enemy'. As a result, it is administered by the 'Verwertungsstelle für jüdisches Umzugsgut der Gestapo' (Gestapo Agency for Jewish Property, or Vugesta), which auctions the looted objects in the Dorotheum auction house or sells them by exhibiting them in Vienna.")
- "144 acquisitions by museums from the Vugesta (the Gestapo office for the disposal of the property of Jewish emigrants) and with regard to more than 200 "aryanised" works acquired by Julius Fargel, the art restorer of the municipal collections and expert assessor of paintings for Vugesta."
- Erich Wolfgang Korngold: "The ANL concluded after its investigation that its Korngold holdings had been confiscated and transferred to the ANL by the Vugesta. Among these materials were 2,122 letters to Erich Wolfgang Korngold, and his father Julius, the prominent Viennese music critic; other important Korngold music library materials remain unaccounted for today.
- Bruno Jellinek: "The original owner of the painting, the Czech businessman Bruno Jellinek, fled Austria following the "Anschluss" in 1938; his art collection was confiscated by the Nazi authorities and sold, partly to private individuals, partly to state collections. The Ostade painting was confiscated by the VUGESTA (Secret State Police Administration Point for Jewish Removals) and brought to the Dorotheum auction house; however, it was sold to the Art History Museum on 2 December 1941 for 16,000 ℛ︁ℳ︁ before its planned sale at auction."
- Bernhard Altmann, Richard Beer-Hofmann, Hugo Blitz, Oscar Bondy, Caroline Czeczowiczka, Hans Engel, Ernst Egger, Josef Freund, Elsa Gall, Robert Gerngross, Daisy Hellmann, Bruno Jellinek, Siegfried Kantor, Gottlieb Kraus, Klara Mertens, Moriz und Stefan Kuffner, Stefan Mautner, Oskar Reichel, Louise Simon oder Siegfried Trebitsch.

== Restitution ==
On 29 April 1999, the Vienna City Council decided that art acquired by questionable means (theft, confiscation, expropriation) during the Nazi era by the city's museums, libraries, archives and collections should to be returned to their original owners or their legal successors. Vugesta purchases between 1940 and 1945 was one of the three categories recognised by the Vienna Museum as looted property.

The Vienna Museum published a list of artworks it had purchased from the Vugesta that had been looted from Jews.

== See also ==
- Nazi plunder
- The Holocaust in Austria
- Unser Wien
