= Unser Wien (Our Vienna) =

2001 book by Stephan Templ and Tina Walzer

Unser Wien (Our Vienna) is a 2001 book co-authored by Stephan Templ and Tina Walzer which details how hundreds of Jewish businesses in Vienna were seized by the Nazis and never given back.

== Background ==
Published in 2001, the book catalogued for the first time the hundreds of prominent Jewish-owned properties seized by the Nazis that were never returned, and details the names of famous beneficiaries.

The first section of the book, written by Walzer, describes the various methods of looting employed by the Nazis and the fate of the Jewish victims, with references to specific cases and examples which provides historical and political context for the second section of the book.

The New York Times noted that "what distinguishes the book is not the history, which was broadly known, but rather the details" in the second half of the book, called The Topography of Robbery which "lists businesses, addresses and former and current owners".

This second half of the book, compiled by co-author Templ, acts as a guided tour of the extent of Jewish property confiscations in Vienna under the Nazis and the stories attached to them. The book details properties seized from Jewish owners such as Samuel Schallinger who co-owned the Imperial and the Bristol hotels, which today are still among the city of Vienna's grandest hotels.

== Controversy ==
The book exposed long-held secrets about the Nazi era in Austria, and helped initiate numerous restitution legal claims. Co-author Templ himself became involved in a restitution case in 2005 which evolved in to a decade of legal entanglement.

In 2015, Templ was convicted of fraud and received a one-year sentence for having allegedly omitted the name of an estranged aunt in an application on behalf of his mother for the return of property seized from his Jewish relatives in 1938. It later emerged that he had actually declared the existence of the aunt, and her name was noted six times on the paperwork Templ had submitted. His conviction was widely condemned by historians of the Holocaust and critics suggested that the jailing was possibly politically motivated retribution for Templ's vocal criticism of the Austrian government's restitution record.

== See also ==
- The Holocaust in Austria
- Aryanization
- Nazi plunder
