= Stephan Templ =

Austrian writer and journalist

Stephan Templ (born 1960) is an Austrian writer and journalist who is best known as the co-author of the book Unser Wien (Our Vienna), which details how hundreds of Jewish businesses and other properties in Vienna were seized by the Nazis and never given back.

== Biography ==
Templ was born in Vienna in 1960. He is now a resident of Prague. He has been a reporter on cultural affairs in eastern Europe for the German newspaper the Frankfurter Allgemeine Zeitung.

== Works ==
Templ is the co-author of the book Unser Wien (Our Vienna), published in 2001, which for the first time catalogued hundreds of Jewish-owned properties in Vienna that were seized under Hitler's regime and never returned to their owners. According to the New York Times, what makes the book notable is not the history, which was broadly known, but rather the details in the second half of the book, called The Topography of Robbery and compiled by Templ, which lists businesses, addresses, and former and current owners.

Other books Templ has worked on include Prague, 20th Century Architecture, edited with Michal Kohout and Vladimír Šlapeta, and published by Springer in 1999.

== Controversy ==
The book Unser Wien (Our Vienna) revealed long-held secrets about the Nazi era in Austria and helped to launch numerous restitution claims. In 2005 Templ himself became involved in a restitution case that developed into ten years of legal entanglements.

In October 2015, Templ received a one-year sentence as punishment for having allegedly omitted the name of an estranged aunt from an application he made on behalf of his mother, Helene, an 80-year-old Holocaust survivor, for the return of property seized from their Jewish relatives in 1938. BBC News noted that critics suggested that the jailing might have been linked to the author’s criticism of the government's restitution record.

At the end of 2015, Templ's legal team were given access to documents held by the Austrian state that proved that Templ had informed officials about his aunt's existence in 2003.
