= The Holocaust in Austria =

Jews were systematically persecuted, plundered, and killed by German and Austrian Nazis in the Holocaust from 1938 to 1945. Pervasive persecution of Jews was immediate after the German annexation of Austria, known as the Anschluss. An estimated 70,000 Jews (nearly 40%) were murdered and 125,000 fled Austria as refugees.

== Jews in Austria before 1938 ==
In the 1930s, Jews flourished in Austria, with leading figures in the sciences, the arts, business, industry, and trades of all kinds. At the time of Anschluss with Nazi Germany in 1938, the Jewish population of Austria was approximately 192,000, mostly in Vienna.

Austria had a powerful legacy of antisemitism which found its full expression in Adolf Hitler. In 1895, the Austrian anti-Semite Karl Lueger won the majority of the seats in the Vienna municipality and was appointed mayor of the Austrian capital. In 1922, intending to mock vicious antisemitism in Vienna where Jewish university students were routinely attacked, the Austrian Hugo Bettauer wrote a futuristic novel entitled, The City Without Jews, which turned out to be tragically prescient.

== Anschluss ==
From 1933, when Adolf Hitler came to power in Germany, the annexation of Austria became one of Germany's foreign policy goals. Austria was incorporated into the Third Reich on March 13, 1938, the day after German troops entered Austrian territory greeted by cheering Austrians with Nazi salutes and Nazi flags. A law was published, declaring Austria "one of the lands of the German Empire" under the name "Ostmark". On April 10, an Anschluss referendum was held in Austria. According to official Reich data, with 99.08% of the population voting, the Anschluss was approved by 99.75%.

== Antisemitic violence and persecution ==
Persecution of Jews was immediate, and of stunning violence, after Anschluss. German racial laws were enacted in Austria, under which Jews were disenfranchised. According to these laws, 220,000 people were now considered Jews in Austria, larger than the previously accepted figure of 182,000. A forced reorganization of Jewish communities was carried out, led by Adolf Eichmann. All Jewish organizations and newspapers were closed and their leaders and management imprisoned. Jews were no longer allowed on public transport. Many regular Austrians joined the Nazis in terrorizing Jews. In acts of public humiliation, Jews were forced to wash sidewalks and public toilets, at times with toothbrushes or their bare hands. In one instance, a number of Jews were rounded up on the Sabbath and forced to eat grass at the Prater, a popular Viennese amusement park. Jewish faculty members of Medical University of Vienna were dismissed.

During Kristallnacht in November 1938, anti-Jewish pogroms took place throughout Germany and Austria. Synagogues were desecrated and destroyed, houses and shops belonging to Jews were looted.

On August 8, 1938, the first Austrian concentration camp is established at Mauthausen.

== Plunder of Jewish property ==
Jewish property was seized by Austrians as part of the Holocaust. There was a massive transfer of homes, businesses, real estate, financial assets and artworks from Jews to non-Jews. A well-organised machinery of plunder, storage, and resale, involving the Gestapo, the Vugesta, the Dorotheum auction house, various transporters, and museums in Vienna moved artworks and other property seized from Jews into the hands of non-Jews.

The book Unser Wien (Our Vienna) by Tina Walzer and Stephan Templ details how hundreds of Jewish businesses in Vienna were seized by the Nazis and never returned after the war.

== Forced emigration ==
In May 1938, the Nazis allowed the Jewish community in Vienna to resume activities, with one intended goal - to organize and accelerate mass emigration of Jews from Austria. The Palestinian Bureau of the World Zionist Organization was permitted to aid in Jewish emigration. In August 1938, the Central Office for Jewish Emigration was established under the leadership of Nazi Adolf Eichmann.

Among the emigrants were such celebrities as Sigmund Freud and Imre Kalman.

After the arrest of all Jewish leaders in March 1938, Eichmann personally appointed Levengertz, Josef Löwenherz head of the Jewish community. On August 22, 1938, Eichmann wrote to Berlin that his office was providing documents for emigration to 200 Jews daily.

Fleeing persecution, 62,958 Jews emigrated in 1938, and another 54,451 in 1939. The so-called Kindertransport started with the transport of the first 600 Viennese Jewish children after a meeting of Dutch organizer Geertruida Wijsmuller-Meijer with Eichmann who gave her permission on Dec. 3rd, 1938. By the outbreak of war in September 1939 however, according to some estimates, as many as 126,445 Jews had departed Austria. Between 58,000 and 66,260 Jews remained in the country. Emigration from the Reich was ultimately banned in October 1941.

At the Wannsee Conference on January 20, 1942, the following data were presented: 147,000 Jews emigrated from Austria from March 15, 1938, to October 31, 1941, 43,700 remained.

== Isolation, deportation, and extermination ==
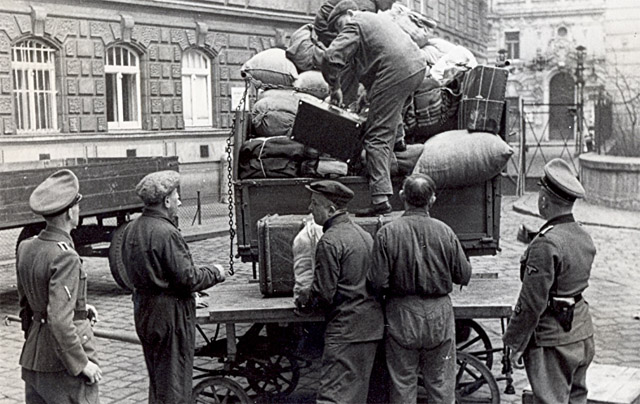
Deportation of Jews from Vienna, 1942

In October 1939, the deportation of Austrian Jews to Poland began, part of a larger plan to ultimately gather and restrict all of Europe's Jewish populace in one territory. 1,584 people were deported to the Lublin region.

The deportation of Jews to death camps began in February 1941. After the Wannsee Conference, this process was accelerated. The Viennese community was officially liquidated on November 1, 1942, at which time approximately 7,000 Jews remained in Austria. The deportations continued until March 1945.

As a result of the Holocaust, according to various sources, between 60,000 and 65,000 Austrian Jews lost their lives - almost the entire number of those who did not leave before the war. Fewer than 800 Jews (mostly spouses of Austrian citizens) survived until the liberation of Vienna by Soviet troops on April 13, 1945. By 1950, the Jewish community in Austria numbered 13,396 people (of whom 12,450 lived in Vienna).

== Protests and resistance ==
As of January 1, 2016, there were 106 Austrians recognized by the Yad Vashem Institute of Holocaust and Heroism as the righteous of the world, for aiding and saving Jews during the Holocaust at the risk of their own lives.

== Holocaust remembrance ==
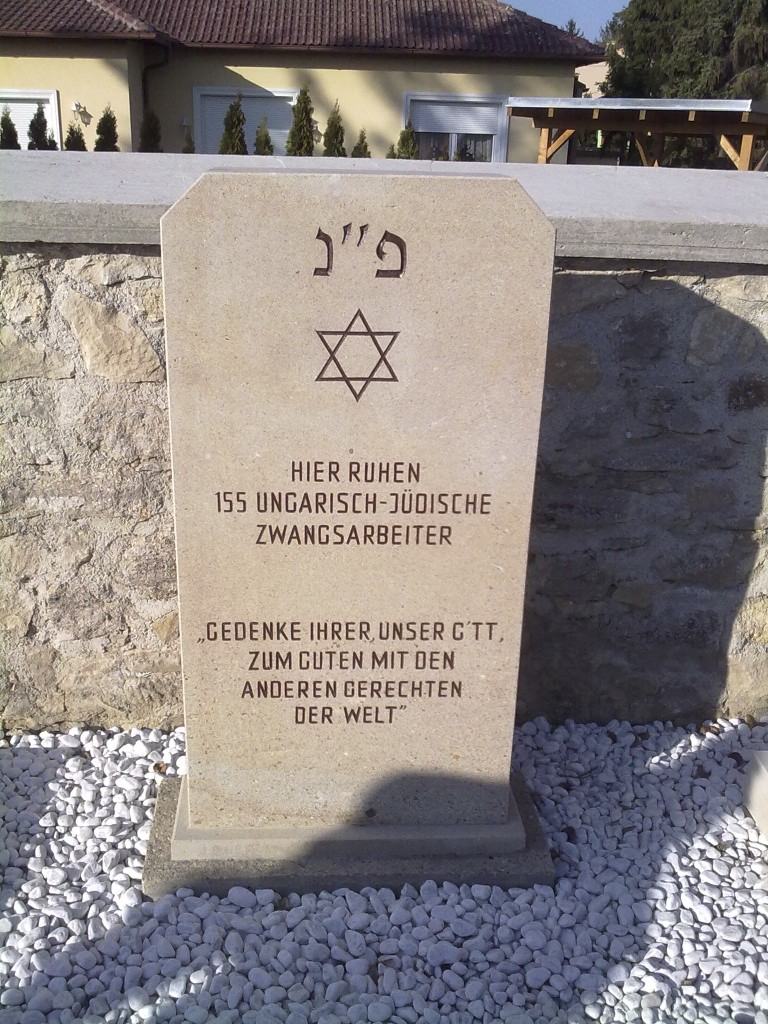
Monument to the Victims of the Holocaust in Bruck an der Leitha

Up until the 1980s, Austrian society adhered to the "First Victim" narrative, which portrayed Austria as a victim, not an enthusiastic supporter of, Nazi Germany and therefore side-stepping responsibility for the crimes of the Third Reich.

Although the Nazi genocide was well documented in the Archives of the Austrian Resistance during the 1960s, actual critical study of the Holocaust did not enter the mainstream of Austrian historiography until the 1980s. The impetus for this was the presidential elections in Austria in 1986, initiated by the scandal regarding the Nazi past of Kurt Waldheim. In 1988, the Historical Commission was established to investigate the plundering of property during the Nazi period, as well as restitution and compensation after 1945.

Austria is a member of the International Holocaust Remembrance Alliance.

While many cities in Austria have constructed memorials to the victims of the Holocaust (see Monument to the Victims of the Holocaust in Vienna), a lack of specificity, for example the actual names of victims not being included, has also been criticised until recently. On November 9, 2021 (i.e., on the 83rd anniversary of Kristallnacht), the Austrian government inaugurated a "Shoah Wall of Names Memorial" at a prominent location (Ostarrichi Park) in central Vienna. This memorial monument is engraved with the names of 64,440 Austrian Jews who were murdered during the Holocaust. It is known that an additional ~1,000 people were murdered, but their names have unfortunately been lost. This memorial monument consists of 160 granite slabs arranged in an oval pattern (each slab is 1 m wide and 2 m high)."

Certain victims' monuments have been repeatedly vandalized.

A study in 2019 found that most Austrian adults were largely ignorant about the Holocaust.

== Holocaust denial ==
Holocaust denial in Austria is a criminal offense. Holocaust deniers are prosecuted under section 3 of the 1947 Constitutional Prohibition Act (Verbotsgesetz 1947), as amended in 1992. The law applies to individuals who publicly deny, belittle, approve, or justify the crimes of National Socialism. Violators are punished with imprisonment for a term of one to ten years (in especially dangerous cases up to twenty years)

This law has been repeatedly applied in practice. In particular, on January 14, 2008, Wolfgang Frolich was sentenced to 6.5 years in prison, and on April 27, 2009, the writer Gerd Honzik was sentenced to 5 years in prison. Judge Stephen Apostol called Honzik "one of the ideological leaders" of European neo-Nazis. The most famous case of prosecution in Austria for Holocaust denial was the arrest and trial of British writer of historical works David Irving in 2006. Irving was sentenced to 3 years in prison, though after 13 months served, the court replaced the remaining term with a suspended sentence and deported him from the country.

== Austrian perpetrators of the Holocaust ==
Adolf Hitler committed suicide on 30 April 1945, one week before the end of war in Europe. The Austrian Nazi and, briefly, Chancellor of Austria, Arthur Seyss-Inquart, was condemned to death at the Nuremberg Trials and executed in 1946. However, many Austrian Nazis escaped prosecution altogether. Franz Josef Huber, the Gestapo chief responsible for the murder of tens of thousands of Austrian Jews, worked for German intelligence after the war and was shielded from prosecution.

== Obstacles to restitution ==
Restitution for the Holocaust has been controversial and faced difficulties in Austria. For many years, Austria's official "first victim" historical stance removed the legal obligation to make reparations for Nazi crimes. Austria's record on restitution has been problematic.

The arrest and imprisonment of the author Stephen Templ, who had inventoried Nazi looted property in Vienna, was strongly criticized. In 2021, in response to criticism about Austria's restitution policies, The City of Vienna threatened to sue an American descendant of the Rothschild family for libel.

== See also ==
- Antisemitism in contemporary Austria
- Anschluss
- Arthur Seyss-Inquart
- Aryanization
- Austria within Nazi Germany
- Commission for Provenance Research
- Deportation
- Gusen concentration camp
- History of the Jews in Austria
- Judenplatz Holocaust Memorial
- List of Austrian Jews
- Therensienstadt
- Unser Wien (Our Vienna)
- Woman in Gold (film)

== Literature ==
- Михман Д. Катастрофа европейского еврейства. — 1. — Тель-Авив: Открытый университет Израиля, 2001. — Т. 1–2. — ISBN 965-06-0233-X.
- Михман Д. Катастрофа европейского еврейства. — 1. — Тель-Авив: Открытый университет Израиля, 2001. — Т. 3–4. — ISBN 965-06-0233-X.
- Doron Rabinovici. Eichmann's Jews: The Jewish Administration of Holocaust Vienna, 1938–1945. — Polity, 2011. — 288 p. — ISBN 978-0745646824.
- Gardiner, Muriel. Code Name «Mary»: Memoirs of an American Woman in the Austrian Underground. New Haven, CT: Yale University Press, 1983.
- Paucker, Arnold. Standhalten und Widerstehen: Der Widerstand deutscher und österreichischer Juden gegen die nationalsozialistische Diktatur. Essen: Klartext, 1995.
- Österreichisches Gallup-Institut. Attitudes toward Jews and the Holocaust in Austria: a public-opinion survey conducted for the American Jewish Committee. — American Jewish Committee, 2001. — 32 p.
