= Galerie Würthle =

Austrian art gallery

Galerie Würthle was an Austrian art gallery, aryanized under the Nazis, that existed from 1881 to 1995.

Located at Weihburggasse 9 in Vienna, not far from Stephansplatz, names associated with the gallery include Lea Bondi, Otto Brill as a partner, Luise Kremlacek, the collector couple Fritz Kamm and Editha Kamm-Ehrbar, the artist Fritz Wotruba, the curator Heimo Kuchling, the exhibition organizer Otto Breicha and the last owner, publisher Hans Dichand. The name of Friedrich Welz, who aryanized the gallery under the Nazis in 1938, is also closely associated with the gallery.

The gallery participated in Art Basel beginning in 1990.

== Owners ==
- 1908–1916 Thekla Würthle
- 1916–1926 Ulf Seidl, with authorized signatories Lea Bondi and Otto Nirenstein
- 1926–1938 Lea Bondi
- 1938–1945 Friedrich Welz
- 1945–1948 Luise Kremlacek (acting director)
- 1949–1953 Lea Bondi
- 1953–1967 Fritz Kamm, Gallerist Fritz Wotruba
- 1968–1974 Heirs of Fritz Kamm
- 1975–1976 Rudolf Kremayr
- 1976–1995 Hans Dichand, Gallerist Johanna Dichand

== History ==
The institution was founded as a branch of the Würthle and Spinnhirn publishing house and art dealership in Salzburg, which in turn had been founded by Gregor Baldi and Friedrich Würthle in 1862. In the spring of 1908, Thekla Würthle registered the company "Würthle & Sohn Nachf." with the Salzburg Commercial Court. The head office was in Salzburg, the branch office at Mariahilferstraße 88a in Vienna. Thekla Würthle was the owner and managing director. At the turn of the year 1915/16, the main branch in Salzburg was closed and the Viennese company, which was now located at Weihburggasse 31, was sold to the k.k. Oberleutnant d. R. and painter Ulf Seidl (1881-1960). The company was entered in the Vienna Commercial Register on February 23, 1917 under Reg. A 34, 88, and the object of the business was now the art trade.

=== before WWII ===
On June 6, 1919, Lea Bondi was entered in the Vienna commercial register as an authorized signatory of Würthle & Sohn Nachfolger. On June 22, 1920, the sole power of attorney was transferred to Otto Nirenstein (1894-1978), later known as Otto Kallir, and the company name was changed to Verlag Neuer Graphik. The aim of the company expansion was to publish contemporary and modern original graphic art from Austria. Among others, works by Faistauer, Itten, Jungnickel, Kubin and posthumously by Schiele were published. Nirenstein's power of attorney was revoked on May 26, 1922. He subsequently founded the Neue Galerie in Grünangergasse. Bondi became an open partner in the Würthle art dealership. In 1926, the owners Leopoldine and Ulf Seidl retired and Bondi became the sole owner of the gallery on August 13, 1926. According to the database of Jewish collectors and art dealers, the manufacturer and collector Otto Brill (1881-1954) is said to have been a partner.

In the interwar years, Lea Bondi cooperated with important art dealers throughout Europe - Alfred Flechtheim (Düsseldorf), Paul Cassirer (Berlin) and Daniel-Henry Kahnweiler (Paris) - and established Galerie Würthle as an important center for contemporary art in Vienna. It showed both Austrian artists and representatives of the international scene.

=== Aryanization ===
With the merger of Austria with Nazi Germany in the Anschluss of 1938, anti-Jewish race laws were enacted, prohibiting Jews from selling to so-called "Aryan" customers. Lea Bondi, who was called Lea Jaray after her marriage in 1936, fled with her husband to London in 1939. Shortly before their departure, the gallery's "Aryanizer", Friedrich Welz, extorted the Portrait of Wally from her, a picture from her private collection, which hung in her apartment.

After the "Aryanization" of Galerie Würthle (on 3 April 1938), the name was changed to Galerie Welz until the fall of the Nazi regime and for another three years.

=== Postwar ===
Friedrich Welz was arrested by the US Army in May 1945, then released and finally imprisoned again in November 1945. He was sent to the Glasenbach camp for war criminals, where he was held by the occupying forces until April 14, 1947. Gert Kerschbaumer described him as a "master of confusion. Welz continued to make a profit in the post-war years by moving, hiding and exchanging paintings. Lea Bondi-Jaray also fell victim to his machinations in the post-war period. The rightful owner of the gallery, now living in London, had chosen Emmerich Hunna, the president of the Vienna Bar Association, as her legal representative, unaware that he himself had been involved in Aryanizations. The gallery was returned to her, but without the so-called "lost" works of art. Notably, at least 47 pieces by Anton Kolig were unaccounted for. Despite her losses, she received no compensation or acknowledgment of lost profits, as her lawyer failed to pursue legal action. Compounding her troubles, on August 17, 1949, she was ordered to pay 9,000 schillings to Friedrich Welz, the aryanizer, as reimbursement for his expenses, with payment due within 14 days. The Schiele painting Wally, which Welz had coerced from her, was sold and moved multiple times without her knowledge and was never returned.

In 1953, sculptor Fritz Wotruba, supported by collectors Fritz and Editha Kamm, transformed the gallery into a showcase for Austrian contemporary art and Viennese modernism, occasionally featuring international avant-garde exhibitions. The Kamm couple maintained a low profile, allowing Wotruba creative freedom. In its inaugural year, the gallery presented works by prominent French artists, including Johnny Friedlaender, Fernand Léger, Pablo Picasso, and Jacques Villon. Wotruba also displayed his own pieces, including stone and bronze sculptures, as well as watercolors and drawings, in 1954.

During the Dichand era, his daughter Johanna Dichand gradually took over the management of the gallery. The gallery slowly lost customers and reputation. The art gallery was closed in 1995. The luxury brand Prada then rented the former gallery premises. In July 2015, after Prada had moved into the Goldenes Quartier, the Salzburg clothing company Dantendorfer took over the business premises.

=== Art Collectors ===
The gallery worked with numerous collectors, such as Heinrich Rieger, who lent works for the first major Egon Schiele exhibition in 1925, Otto Brill, Viktor Fogarassy, Rudolf Leopold, the Kamm couple and Hans Dichand.

== See also ==
- Portrait of Wally
- List of claims for restitution for Nazi-looted art
- The Holocaust in Austria
- Vugesta

== Literature ==
Luise Kremlacek, Hans Dichand (Hrsg.): 60 Jahre Galerie Würthle 60 Jahre moderne Kunst in Österreich Band 1 und 2, Galerie Würthle, Wien 1981
