= Dead City III =

Painting by Egon Schiele

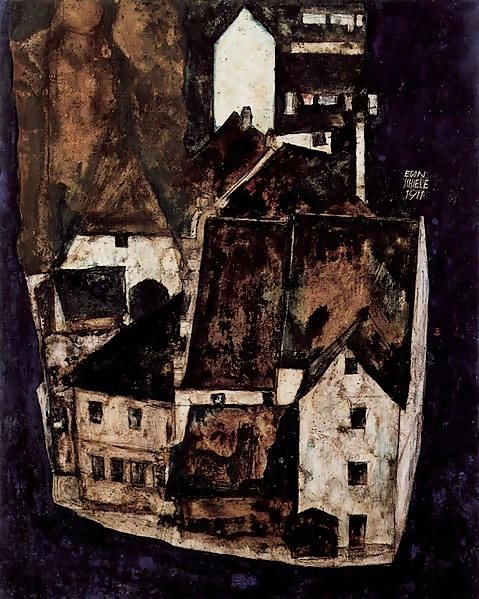
- Artist: Egon Schiele
- Year: 1911
- Medium: Oil on canvas
- Dimensions: 37.3 cm × 29.8 cm (14.7 in × 11.7 in)
- Location: Leopold Museum, Vienna

Dead City III (German: Tote Stadt III) is an oil on wood expressionist painting by Egon Schiele from 1911. It was owned by the Viennese cabaret artist Fritz Grünbaum before he was murdered by Nazis and has been the object of high-profile disputes and court battles. Suspected by New York's District Attorney of having been looted by the Nazis, Dead City III was temporarily confiscated from the Austrian art collector Rudolf Leopold after he loaned it to a New York museum in 1998. The ownership history of the painting has been the object of high-profile court cases in which two very different versions of the painting's journey from the Jewish Holocaust victim to the Austrian art collector collide.

== Description ==
Dead City III is a small painting on wood with the dimensions 37.3 cm × 29.8 cm (14.7 in × 11.7 in). It is a variation of the repeated executed motif by the artist of a view of the Bohemian town of Český Krumlov, known in German as Krumau, as seen from the castle hill. It is the birthplace of Schiele's mother, to where the painter repeatedly withdrew from Viennese city life. The picture shows a group of houses, enclosed on three sides by a deep blue ring symbolizing the Vltava, so that the village seems isolated and like floating in an indefinable, abstract space. The painting shows the artist's development, using representations of nature not only as expressions for moods and sensations, but as carriers of deep content. The city becomes a still life in the best sense of a nature morte, "emerging from the dark in a mysterious and visionary manner".

== Provenance ==
The provenance of Dead City III has been hotly contested. Two different versions have been presented, one by the heirs to Fritz Grünbaum and his wife, both murdered by Nazis in the Holocaust, and other by the Leopold Museum, in its court defense.

Dead City III was bought directly from the artist by the art historian Arthur Roessler (1877–1955), resold by him to the lawyer Alfred Spitzer (1861–1923) and finally acquired between 1925 and 1928 by the Viennese cabaret artist Fritz Grünbaum (1880–1941). Grünbaum died in the Dachau concentration camp, while his wife Lilly Grünbaum (1898–1942) was deported to the Maly Trostinez extermination camp. In 1958 the art dealer Otto Kallir sold Dead City III to the Austrian art collector Rudolf Leopold who amassed a large collection of Schiele's works.

According to the Leopold Museum's version of the provenance, which it submitted in court documents, Lilly Grünbaum was able to take parts of Grünbaum's art collection to Belgium and transfer them to her sister, Mathilde Lukacs, who, according the Leopold Museum's provenance researcher, sold Dead City III on 22 May 1956 to the art dealer Klipstein & Kornfeld in Bern, from where it was resold on 24 September 1956 to Otto Kallir, owner of the St. Etienne Gallery in New York, who sold it, in 1958, to Rudolf Leopold.

The museum's version of the story was vigorously challenged by the Grünbaum family, which stated that it was false. According to the family of Fritz Grünbaum, the story about Lilly Grünbaum selling Dead City III to Otto Kallir was a fiction, created to cover the Nazi looting of the painting.

At a Schiele retrospective in New York at the end of 1997, the painting was seized by the New York public prosecutor's office. The painting was returned to the Leopold Collection in Vienna after the court ruled, however, that the exhibition at MoMA was protected by "immunity from seizure" by treaty. The legal battle over the portrait of Wally lasted until July 2010.

The Grünbaum collection included 81 artworks by Schiele, several which have been restituted after having been acknowledged to have been looted by the Nazis.

== Literature ==
- Gunnar Schnabel, Monika Tatzkow: Nazi Looted Art. Handbuch Kunstrestitution weltweit. Proprietas-Verlag, Berlin 2007, ISBN 978-3-00-019368-2, S. 392 (Fall 66)

== See also ==
- The Holocaust in Austria
- List of claims for restitution for Nazi-looted art
- Egon Schiele
- Degenerate art
