= Judith H. Dobrzynski =

American journalist

Judith Helen Dobrzynski
- Born: 1949 (age 75–76); Rochester, New York, US
- Occupation(s): Journalist, instructor in journalism
- Notable credit(s): CNBC, The New York Times, The Wall Street Journal, Business Week

Judith Helen Dobrzynski (born March 8, 1949) is an American journalist and instructor in journalism. She is currently a freelance writer who has contributed articles on culture, the arts, business, philanthropy and other topics to The New York Times, The Wall Street Journal and several magazines.

She also writes opinion columns and commentaries, and has contributed op-eds to The New York Times, the Los Angeles Times, The Wall Street Journal, the Chicago Tribune and The Boston Globe.

In March, 2009, she became a blogger, writing about culture in America at ArtsJournal.com.

She has been editor of the Sunday "Money & Business" section of The New York Times as well as a reporter for the newspaper, a senior editor of Business Week and, most recently, the executive editor and managing editor of CNBC, the cable television business network.

== Career ==
Dobrzynski, in the 1980s, while she was at Business Week, was one of the first journalists to write about activist shareholders and the importance of good corporate governance.

While Dobrzynski was an arts reporter at The New York Times, she wrote an investigative article about the Museum of Modern Art's exhibition of paintings owned by Rudolph Leopold, a Viennese doctor and art collector. (Many of those works are now on view at the Leopold Museum in Vienna).

Her article told the story of Portrait of Wally by Egon Schiele, which had been taken from its Jewish owner, Lea Bondi Jaray, in the Nazi era and later purchased by Leopold. Soon after the story was published, the Manhattan District Attorney Robert Morgenthau started proceedings to help restore the piece to descendants of its owner. After years of legal wranglings, the ownership of the painting was decided in an out-of-court settlement in July, 2010: The Leopold Museum agreed to pay Bondi's heirs $19 million for the portrait and to permanently display, wherever the painting is on view, the correct accounting of its ownership "including Lea Bondi Jaray’s prior ownership of the Painting and its theft from her by a Nazi agent before she fled to London in 1939."

A documentary about the case, called "Portrait of Wally," made its debut in spring 2012 at the Tribeca Film Festival to favorable reviews. The Forward said the "film that carefully reviews the complex history of the painting."

The outrage that followed Dobrzynski's articles helped persuade Austria to change its laws. Austrian Culture Minister Elizabeth Gehrer specifically mentioned the uproar about "Portrait of Wally" when she announced the policy change in March 1998, and again when she sent a draft law on the restitution of art confiscated by the Nazis to Parliament in September 1998.

Dobrzynski's articles about the Bondi case have been cited in many books and legal articles about Nazi-looted art, including "Holocaust Restitution: Perspectives on the Litigation and Its Legacy" (Ed: Michael Bayzeler, NYU Press, 2005) and a paper given at a restitution seminar in 1998 by the Dutch lawyer Gert-Jan van den Bergh. E. Randol Schoenberg, who served as attorney in the famous case claiming five Gustav Klimt paintings for the heirs of Adele Bloch-Bauer, also cited Dobrzynski's 1997 article in his paper, delivered at the International Foundation for Art Research in July, 2006, saying that it changed the climate for Nazi-looted art claims. When Bettina Rothschild Looram died in 2012, the Daily Telegraph in London cited the Bondi case as a reason "Austria’s minister of culture had directed the country’s national museums to identify any items in their collections that had been stolen or extorted by the Nazis from the Jews."

Dobrzynski has also written many other articles about Nazi-looted art.

In May 2000, Dobrzynski began a series of articles in The New York Times about art fraud on eBay auctions, which later lead to an investigative piece disclosing the widespread practice of shill bidding on eBay. That story prompted the Federal Bureau of Investigation to step in, and resulted in the prosecution of several shill bidders. One, Kenneth Walton, wrote a book recounting his experience of the scandal, in which Dobrzynski is characterized as "the one I feared most."

Dobrzynski was a Knight fellow at the Salzburg Global Seminar in 2002, and has twice returned as a fellow for additional sessions.

== Personal ==
Dobrzynski grew up in Rochester, New York and received an honors degree in journalism from Syracuse University.
