= Lea Bondi =

Jewish art collector, and refugee from Nazi Germany (1880–1969)

Lea Bondi Jaray
- Born: Lea Bondi; 12 December 1880
- Died: 1969 (aged 88–89)
- Occupation: art dealer
- Known for: Struggle to recover Egon Schiele‘s “Portrait of Wally” wrongfully expropriated by the Nazis in 1939.

Lea Bondi, later Lea Jaray or Lea Bondi-Jaray (12 December 1880 – 1969) was an Austrian art dealer and art collector who was forced to emigrate to Great Britain due to Nazi persecution after the annexation of Austria to the Nazi German Reich. The Würthle Gallery, which she ran, was "Aryanized" by Nazis and her art collection, including the Portrait of Wally by Egon Schiele, extorted.

== Biography ==
=== Family ===
Lea Bondi was born into a German-Jewish merchant family in Mainz who moved to Vienna in the mid-1880s. Her parents were Marcus Bondi (1831–1926) and Bertha nee Hirsch (1842–1912). She had 15 siblings, eight brothers, seven sisters.

In 1936 she married the sculptor Alexander Sándor Járay (1870–1943) from Temešvár, after his first wife died becoming Lea Jaray or Lea Bondi-Jaray.

=== Gallery owner in Vienna ===
On 6 June 1919, Lea Bondi was entered in the Vienna Commercial Register as authorized signatory of the Würthle & Sohn Successor, known as Kunsthandlung Würthle or later as Galerie Würthle. In the following year the business was expanded and Verlag Neuer Graphik added to the name. On 22 June 1920, Otto Nirenstein (1894–1978), who later became known as Otto Kallir, also received individual procuration. The expanded company published contemporary and modern original graphics from Austria by artists such as Faistauer, Itten, Jungnickel, Kubin and Schiele. Nirenstein's power of attorney was canceled on 26 May 1922. Bondi became an open partner in the company. In 1926, the owners Leopoldine and Ulf Seidl (1881–1960) resigned; on 13 August 1926, Bondi became the sole owner of the art dealership. According to the database of Jewish collectors and art dealers, the manufacturer and collector Otto Brill (1881–1954) is said to have been a partner.

Lea Bondi also collected art, acquiring the Portrait of Wally (Wally Neuzil) by Egon Schiele in the mid-1920s. She herself was portrayed several times, including in 1927 by Christian Schad in oil on wood.

=== Aryanization, robbery, emigration ===
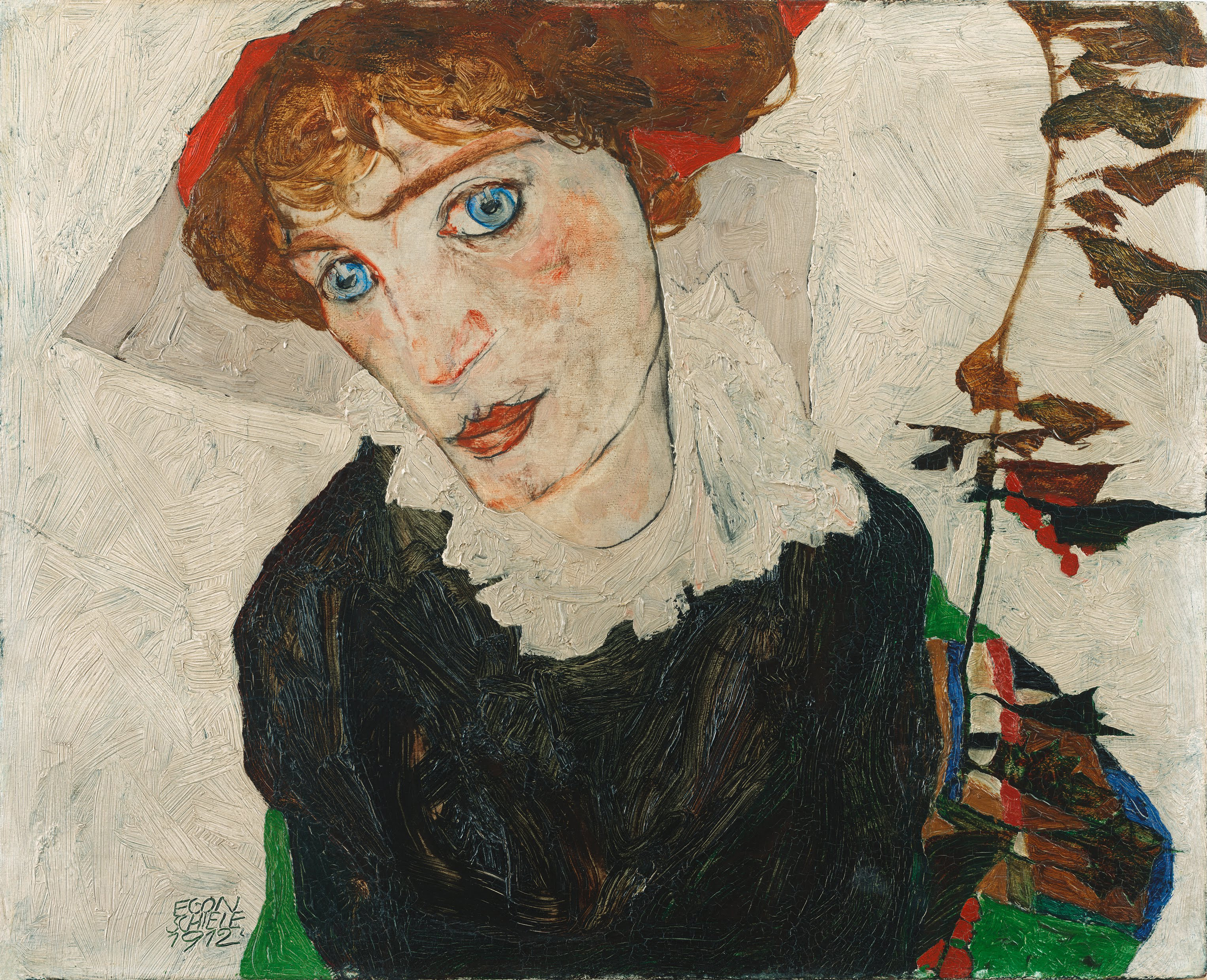
Portrait of Walburga Neuzil, called Wally, by Egon Schiele, 1912

There are no original sources about the Aryanization of the Würthle Gallery by the Salzburg art dealer Friedrich Welz, because – as emerged on the occasion of allegations of fraud against Welz in 1943 – according to Welz, “no written contract was concluded [...] – only in its place a log that Welz keeps at the disposal of the tax office. ". Following the Aryanization of the Würthle gallery, Friedrich Welz visited Bondi-Jaray in her home at Weißgerberlände 38, on the Danube Canal the day before the planned departure for London, 17 March 1939. Schiele's Portrait of Wally hung on the wall. Welz immediately recognized the value of the painting and demanded it, as well as a piece of furniture. Lea Bondi-Jaray made it clear that it had been her private property for many years and that the picture neither belonged to Galerie Würthle nor was it for sale. Welz insisted until Bondi-Jaray's husband told her not to risk the planned escape. According to court filings, he told her she should not resist Welz, because "you know what he [Welz] can do.'"

=== Holocaust: Fate of family members ===
Four sisters and a brother were murdered in the Shoah, Rosa Gradenwitz and Helene Hausdorff in the Auschwitz-Birkenau concentration camp, Esther in Prague, Hilde in Majdanek and Siegmund Bondi in the final days of the Nazi regime in 1945 in the Bergen-Belsen concentration camp. Three brothers escaped, Joseph to New York, Hugo Naftali to Palestine and Samuel Bondi, a cardiologist, to New York via London.

=== Gallery owner in London ===
In 1939 Bondi-Jaray fled to London with her husband. She could only take with her what she could carry, including a number of drawings, and certainly some sheets by Egon Schiele. She lived in Hampstead and dealt in works by Austrian emigrés. Her husband died in London on 5 July 1943. In the same year, she and Otto Brill, who had also managed to escape to London, took over St. George’s Gallery at 81 Grosvenor Street in Mayfair. The previous owner was Arthur Rowland Howell (1881–1956), who had sold works by contemporary English artists such as Frances Hodgkins and David Jones there. In addition to graphics, there were new and used books to buy on all areas of art, theater and music. The gallery quickly became a point of contact for German-speaking emigrants and gave some of them work, for example Erica Brausen and Harry Fischer, who later both founded well-known galleries in London. Lea Jaray presented contemporary artists of various styles, including Massimo Campigli, Lucian Freud, Alberto Giacometti, Oskar Kokoschka, André Masson, Ceri Richards and others. She was one of the first to show expressionist works in London, an area in which she had a high level of expertise. In 1947 the gallery was sponsored by the British Council for exhibitions of British and French artists of the new generation. Lea Jaray became a British citizen in April 1948. In 1950 she showed her Contemporary Austrian Painters gallery in cooperation with the Albertina and the Federal Ministry for Education, which is responsible for culture. After that, the gallery was closed due to lack of profitability. Agatha Sadler, Otto Brill's younger daughter, who was in charge of the range of books, secured the name and, after a long period of building work at various addresses, was able to set up what would later become a famous antiquarian bookshop, St. George’s Gallery Books Ltd.

The British art critic William Feaver wrote of Lea Jaray: “In her London gallery she presented international artists,“ Known and Unknown ”, as the title of a group exhibition in which Lucian Freud was represented. The artist paid her high praise: "She really loved art." "

=== Restitution ===
From 1945 onwards, Luise Kremlacek became acting as head of the gallery. After a decision by the Austrian Restitution Commission on 17 March 1948, Friedrich Welz had to restitute the "Galerie Würthle" to Lea Bondi-Jaray. Welz then claimed expenses for the gallery. A second hearing was decided in favor of Welz, the "Aryanizer". To get their company back, Bondi-Jaray had to pay him 9,000 shillings. The gallery's collection, including 47 works of art by Anton Kolig, as well as the Schiele painting “Wally” from 1912, whose legal owner was Lea Bondi-Jaray, were considered lost.

When she asked, Welz reported that Schiele's painting had been confiscated along with other works of art and was in the Belvedere's collections. Since Bondi-Jaray had to go back to London, she could not attend to the matter further. In 1953 she was visited in London by the doctor and collector Rudolf Leopold, with whom she also spoke about the picture of "Wally". She asked him to endeavor to return it. The next thing she heard about the picture was that it was in Leopold's possession. In 1957 she asked the collector, through a lawyer, to return the painting to her. Leopold replied that she no longer had any ownership rights to the painting because she had failed to reclaim it from the Belvedere. The picture now belongs to him. The attorney's answer was that Bondi-Jaray had never given up her claims to the picture and that the Wally only came into the possession of the Rieger heirs through a mix-up and from there to the Belvedere. The lawyer recommended a lawsuit, but Lea Bondi-Jaray refuses because she did not trust the Austrian judiciary. She wrote to the lawyer: "if the lawsuit is lost, I have lost my picture forever." [If the trial is lost, I will have lost my painting forever.]

In August 1966 she asked Otto Kallir, Schiele expert and gallery owner in Manhattan, also an emigrant from Vienna, for help. In a letter to him written in German, she described how Welz's picture had been extorted from her. Lea Bondi-Jaray tried to recover the painting until her death. She died (in London) without receiving it or receiving any compensation.

In January 1998, Manhattan District Attorney Robert Morgenthau placed Wally (and Dead City III of 1912, another allegedly Nazi-looted work) under subpoena as part of an investigation into whether the pictures were stolen objects brought illegally into New York State. It was on loan at the Museum of Modern Art in New York and was subsequently in state custody for more than ten years as the subject of legal disputes between Bondi-Jaray's heirs and the collector Rudolf Leopold. After the collector's death, the Leopold Museum paid $ 19 million and the painting returned to Vienna.

In July 2010 fifty members of the dispersed Bondi family reunited to commemorate and celebrate in the lobby of the Museum of Jewish Heritage in New York. According to art chronicler Lee Rosenbaum, who was present at the event, it was a moment of great emotion. "Andre Bondi, Lea’s grandnephew...spoke movingly and emotionally of his father Henry‘s efforts to right a historic wrong. When Andre tearfully ended with a description of his late father’s reaction to a favorable legal development in the protracted case, there were few dry eyes in the house:

A documentary film was made about the case in 2012. The film presented the history of the artwork and the positive impact that Lea Bondi's struggle to recover it had on restitution efforts for Nazi looted art.

== See also ==
The Holocaust in Austria

== Links ==
- Analysis of Lea Bondi Jaray Case by Rafael Ramos (Historical Society of the New York Courts)
- Portrait of Wally – United States and Estate of Lea Bondi and Leopold Museum
