= Gutekunst =

Gute(n)kunst is a southern German surname, literally meaning "good at art". It originates from the Black Forest of the former kingdom of Württemberg. According to some onomasticians, the name describes an "artful" or "skillful" person. Others claim that the name has a matronymic meaning and is a combination of Guta (female name, popular in the Middle Ages in southern Germany) and Kunz (short for Konstatin or Konrad). The meaning would thus be Kunz, son of Guta.

After emigration to America, the name has been spelled in various ways (e.g. Gutakunst or Guttikunst). It has even been translated to Goodart or spelled as Goodykoontz, so that its English pronunciation would come closer to its southern German phonetic, which indeed is Goode-Koonsht.

== Notable people with the surname include ==
- Brian Gutekunst (born 1973), American football executive
- Frederick Gutekunst (1831–1917), American photographer
- John Gutekunst (born 1944), American football player and coach
- Otto Gutekunst (1866–1947), British art dealer
- Richard Gutekunst (1870–1961), German art dealer, brother of Otto
- Samuel Gutekunst (born 1984), American football player
- Jasper Goodykoontz (1855–1923), American author
- Wells Goodykoontz (1872–1944), American politician
