= Kerschbaumer =

Kerschbaumer is a surname. Notable people with the surname include:

- Gerhard Kerschbaumer (born 1991), Italian cross-country mountain biker
- Gert Kerschbaumer (born 1945), Austrian historian
- Konstantin Kerschbaumer (born 1992), Austrian footballer
- Rosa Kerschbaumer-Putjata (1851–1923), Russian-Austrian ophthalmologist who was the first female doctor in Austria
- Sepp Kerschbaumer (1913–1964), South Tyrolean separatist
