= Galerie Kornfeld =

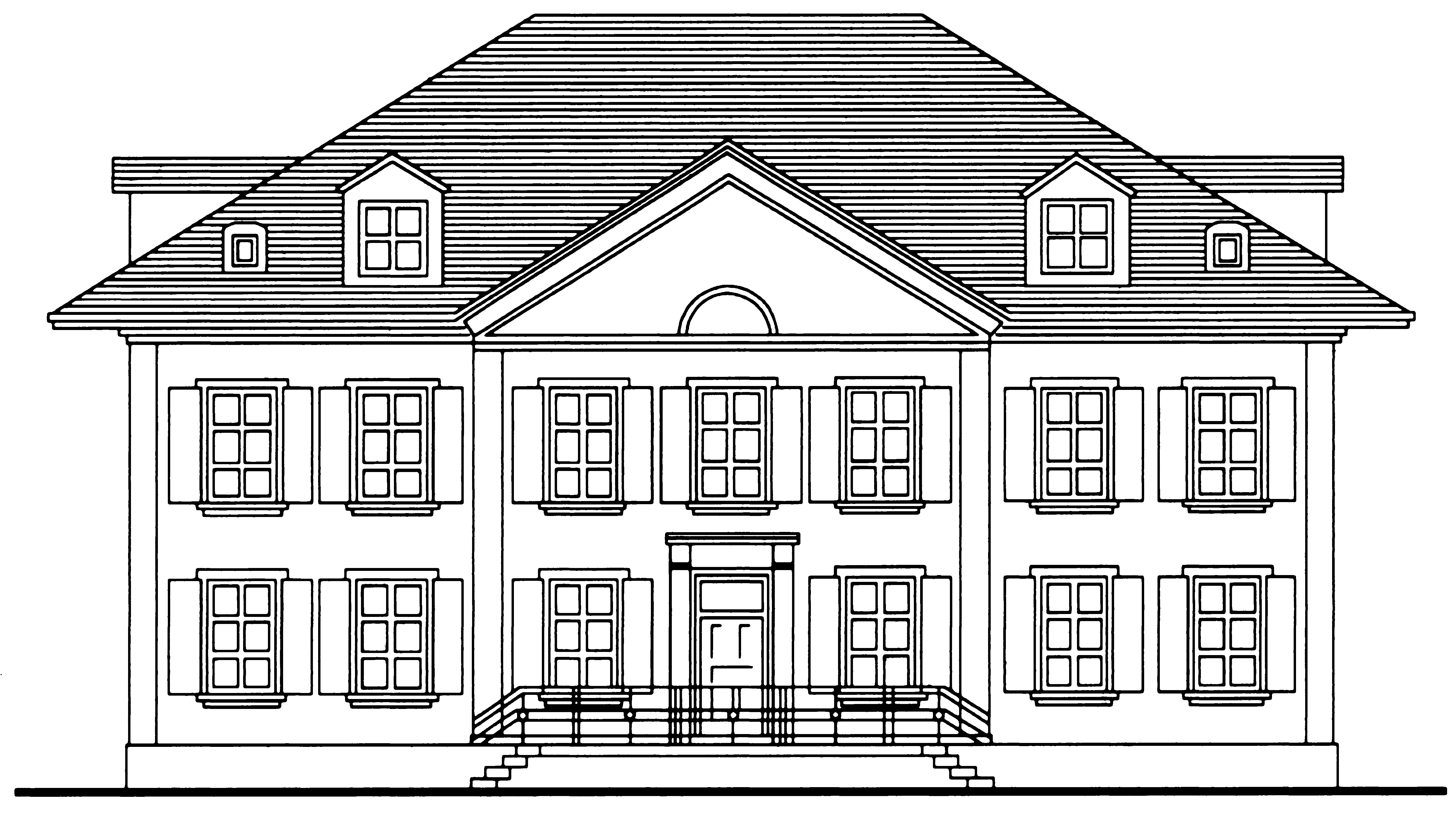
Logo of the Galerie Kornfeld.

Galerie Kornfeld is a privately owned Swiss auction house in Bern and one of the leading auction houses in Switzerland in the fields of Modern Art (paintings, drawings, prints and sculptures) as well as Old Master prints and drawings.

== History ==
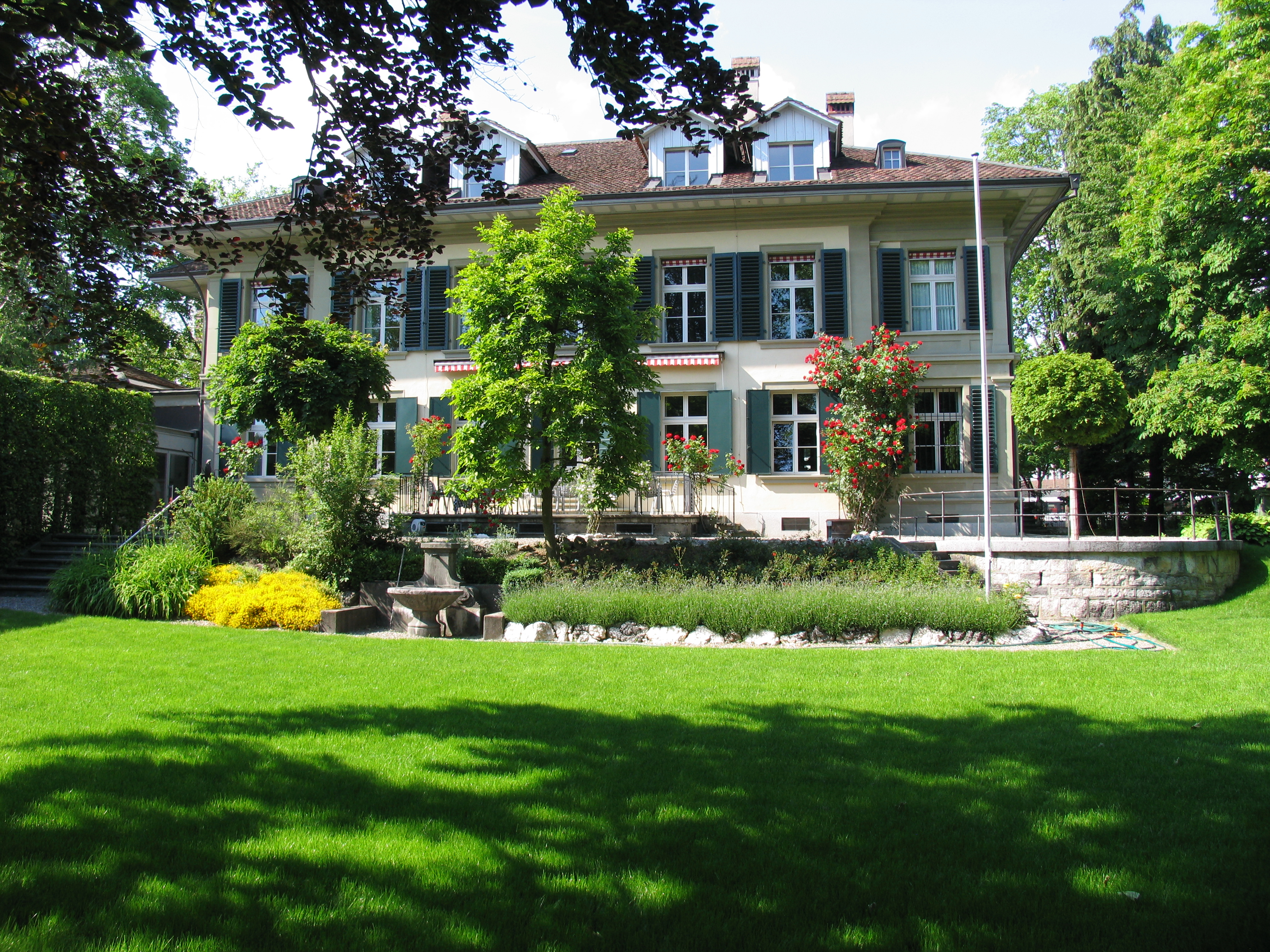
View from the garden

Heinrich Georg Gutekunst opened his gallery for Old and Modern Art in Stuttgart on 1 October 1864 and established the basis for a tradition, which remains unbroken until today and to which, since 1919 in Bern, the vital activities of Galerie Kornfeld can be traced back. The first auction series took place in Stuttgart from 1868 to 1914. His son Richard Gutekunst opened a gallery in 1895 under the name Richard Gutekunst. When HG Gutekunst retired in 1910 Wilhelm A. Gaiser took over the firm until 1914. After the World War I Gutekunst reopened the gallery in Bern together with August Klipstein. Gutekunst retired in 1934 and Eberhard W. Kornfeld took over when Klipstein died in 1951. The gallery's name changed from Klipstein & Kornfeld, to Kornfeld & Klipstein and finally to Galerie Kornfeld. The gallery held sales and auctions that transferred numerous artworks to the United States and other countries.

== Locations ==
Galerie Kornfeld has its headquarters in the historic Villa Thurmau at Laupenstrasse 41 in Bern. The large sales room pavilion which can accommodate more than 300 auction guests is embedded in a garden laid out in the middle of the nineteenth century. The Zürich office lies in an old villa at Titlisstrasse 48.

== Activities ==
=== Sales ===
Galerie Kornfeld holds annual auction sales over several days in June to coincide with ART Basel, a lively social event which attracts collectors, museum curators and art lovers from all over the world. Specialist areas include Modern Art, Old Master Prints, Swiss Art and Contemporary Art.

The Galerie also works throughout the year as a classic art gallery and dealers. Usually in autumn and winter, up to three exhibitions are organised on the premises.

=== Publishing ===
The experts at Galerie Kornfeld also work on publishing comprehensive catalogues raisonné of renowned artists like Ernst Ludwig Kirchner, Max Beckmann, Paul Klee, Käthe Kollwitz, Paul Gauguin, Pablo Picasso and Alberto Giacometti.

== Managing Partners ==
Eberhard W. Kornfeld
Christine E. Stauffer
Bernhard U. Bischoff
Christoph Kunz

== Notable auctions ==
- In May 1910 Gutekunst, now Galerie Kornfeld, auctioned the collection Baron Adalbert von Lanna, Prague. Included was a drawing of Adam and Eve by Albrecht Dürer, sold for 65,000 Goldmark and now in the collection of the Pierpont Morgan Library in New York.
- In June 1954 Klipstein & Kornfeld auctioned a rare print by Rembrandt, the Portrait of Jan Six, for CHF 34,000. The very same print was auctioned again in June 2014 and achieved CHF 480,000.
- The first hammer price over one million Swiss Francs was at the special sale of the Arthur Stoll collection in November 1972 for "L'arbre tordu" a painting by Paul Cézanne achieving CHF 1,480,000 and now in the Hiroshima Museum of Art.
