= Friedrich Welz =

Austrian art dealer, publisher (1903–1980)

Friedrich Maximilian Welz (born 2 November 1903 in Salzburg; died 5 February 1980 in Salzburg) was an Austrian art dealer and Nazi Party member investigated for art looting.

== Biography ==
=== Welz Gallery ===
Friedrich Welz took over his father's picture frame shop in Sigmund-Haffner-Gasse in 1934 as manager and in 1937 as owner. In it he opened his "art store", which soon developed into the "Galerie Welz", whose first exhibitions were devoted to the works of Klimt, Schiele, Kubin and Oskar Kokoschka. Later exhibitions focused on the Vienna Secession, the Nötscher Kreis (Nötsch Circle), Italian and French art of the 19th and 20th centuries, and German Expressionism. In 1937 he moved the gallery to the vacated showrooms of the "Wittek Villa" in Schwarzstraße. There he organized with Otto Kallir the "Waldmüller Exhibition", which was highly regarded during the Austrofascist Ständestaat. Prominent visitors included Franz Rehrl, then governor of Salzburg, and Austrian Chancellor Kurt Schuschnigg.

== Rise during National Socialism ==
Welz was a Nazi party member, joining officially in July 1938 with party number: 6 339 332.

Immediately after the Anschluss of Austria with Hitler's Third Reich in 1938, Austria's Jews were persecuted and their property transferred to non-Jews. Welz's career blossomed. In April 1938, Welz took over the Würthle Gallery in Vienna, whose Jewish art dealer, Lea Bondi-Jaray, had been forced to transfer to a non-Jewish owner on April 3, 1938, in "Aryanization".

In 1939 and 1940, Welz acquired 26 works from the Jewish art collector Heinrich Rieger who was deported to Theresienstadt and murdered in the Holocaust, along with his wife. Paintings acquired by Welz from Rieger's collection included Egon Schiele's "Embrace" and "Cardinal and Nun" as well as Josef Dobrowsky's "Poor in Spirit,"

Welz was involved in the creation of the Landesgalerie Salzburg under the Nazis.

In 1940 he curated an exhibition of Hans Makart, an artist favored by the Nazis. Hermann Göring was the patron of the exhibition, Adolf Hitler's personal photographer Heinrich Hoffmann edited the exhibition catalog for which Albert Reitter wrote the foreword.

Welz undertook regular buying trips to Nazi-occupied Paris on behalf of Baldur von Schirach and other prominent Nazis.

His connections in the Nazi art world included Bruno Grimschitz and Kajetan and Josef Mühlmann.

== Postwar ==
After the defeat of Nazi Germany, Welz was arrested and investigated for his role in looting art from Jewish collections.

The Americans appointed the provisional administrator Fritz Hoefner for Welz's Salzburg art dealership, who reported Welz to the public prosecutor's office of the People's Court in Linz on June 26, 1947, for the "Aryanization" of a villa in St. Gilgen, the Würthle Gallery and the Heinrich Rieger Collection within the meaning of § 6 KVG for "abusive enrichment". The proceedings ended in 1949 and 1950 respectively with a partial acknowledgement and an out-of-court settlement.

After his release, Friedrich Welz returned to the art scene.

In 1976 Welz bequeathed a large part of his private collection, including the complete printed works of Oskar Kokoschka to the province of Salzburg.

Friedrich Welz died on February 5, 1980, in his hometown and was buried in the family grave at Salzburg's municipal cemetery.

In 2000 a Welz biography criticized Salzburg authorities for having whitewashed Welz's role in procuring Nazi-looted art.

== Claims for restitution of Nazi-looted art acquired by Welz ==
Numerous lawsuits have been filed requesting the restitution of artworks acquired by Welz from Jewish collectors under the Nazis in Austria. These include claims by the heirs of Lea Bondi for the Portrait of Wally, by Egon Schiele, and by the heirs of Heinrich Rieger for "Wayside Shrine", also by Schiele. In 2023 a 1910 Klimt that had been owned by Irene Beran before she fled the Nazi was the object of a restitution and repurchase agreement between the Beran heirs and Ronald S. Lauder.

== Family ==
Friedrich Welz was the brother of Jean Welz, a painter and architect.

== Literature and sources ==
- Gert Kerschbaumer: Meister des Verwirrens. Die Geschäfte des Kunsthändlers Friedrich Welz. Czernin Verlag. Wien 2000. ISBN 3-7076-0030-0
- Fritz Koller: Inventarbuch der Landesgalerie Salzburg 1942-1944. Salzburg 2000, S. 11–14.
- Adolf Haslinger, Peter Mittermayr (Hg.): Salzburger Kulturlexikon. Residenz Verlag. Salzburg-Wien-Frankfurt/Main 2001. ISBN 3-7017-1129-1
- Friederike Zaisberger, Reinhard R. Heinisch: Leben über den Tod hinaus... Prominente im Salzburger Kommunalfriedhof. Mitteilungen der Gesellschaft für Salzburger Landeskunde. 23. Ergänzungsband. Selbstverlag der Gesellschaft. Salzburg 2006

== See also ==
- List of claims for restitution of Nazi-looted art
- Lea Bondi
- Heinrich Rieger
- Fritz Grünbaum
- Aryanization
- The Holocaust in Austria
