= Otto Tschumi =

Swiss painter

- Born: 4 August 1904; Bittwil, Seeberg, Switzerland
- Died: 18 February 1985 (aged 80); Bern, Switzerland
- Known for: Painting, graphic art, illustration, writing
- Movement: Surrealism
- Spouse: Beatrice Gutekunst

Otto Tschumi (4 August 1904 – 18 February 1985) was a Swiss painter and a leading representative of Surrealism in Switzerland. He was largely self-taught, and his early work was influenced by Cubism before he turned to Surrealism. His work was shown at the inaugural São Paulo Art Biennial in 1951, and he represented Switzerland at the 1960 Venice Biennale.

== Biography ==
Otto Tschumi was born on 4 August 1904 in Bittwil, in the municipality of Seeberg. His family initially lived in Oberhofen before moving to Bern, where he grew up in modest circumstances. After leaving school, he attempted to establish himself in several occupations before undertaking a traineeship with a sign painter in Nancy in 1919. From 1920, he worked as a graphic designer in Bern. Between 1921 and 1925, he attended classes taught by Ernst Linck at the Bern School of Applied Arts, while otherwise developing largely through independent study.

In 1933, Tschumi married the English dancer Beatrice Gutekunst. The couple relocated to Paris in 1936, following a six-month stay in London. During his years there, Tschumi was in contact with Max Ernst, Hans Arp, Alberto Giacometti and other artists associated with Surrealism. In 1937, Galerie Jeanne Bucher presented his first solo exhibition. Shortly before the German invasion of France in 1940, the couple returned to Switzerland and initially lived in Köniz. He settled in Bern in 1941. Between 1963 and 1976, he travelled to Italy almost every year. Tschumi died in Bern on 18 February 1985.

== Work ==
Tschumi was a painter and graphic artist whose work also encompassed illustration, writing and public art. His early work drew on Cubism, combining geometric forms with distorted representations of the human figure. His work showed the influence of Hans Arp, Max Ernst and Paul Klee at different stages of his career.

His years in Paris brought him into closer contact with Surrealism, which became central to his work. Organic forms increasingly appeared alongside the geometric structures of his earlier work. He remained independent of artists’ groups while drawing on Surrealism’s emphasis on artistic freedom. His images combined abstraction and distortion with recognisable details. During the Second World War, his Surrealist work was overshadowed by the dominant figurative art in Switzerland. His compositions ranged from simplified forms to intricately detailed imagery.

Tschumi became a leading representative of Surrealism in Switzerland. His public commissions included murals for the 1949 cantonal exhibition in Thun, the Federal Customs Directorate in Bern in 1955, and a school in Dürrenast in 1958.

His works are held in several public collections, including the Kunstmuseum Bern, Kunstmuseum Olten, Kunstmuseum Solothurn, Kunstmuseum Winterthur and Kunsthaus Zürich.

== Exhibitions ==
Tschumi exhibited at the Kunsthalle Bern in 1946, and his work was shown at the inaugural São Paulo Art Biennial in 1951. He represented Switzerland at the Venice Biennale in 1960 alongside the painter Varlin and sculptor Robert Müller. Solo exhibitions were held at the Kunsthalle Bern in 1961, Galerie Kornfeld and Klipstein in 1966, and the Kunstmuseum Winterthur in 1968. His last solo exhibition was presented by Galerie Kornfeld in Bern in 1984.

A comprehensive retrospective was held in 1987 in Bern, Mulhouse and Nuremberg.
