= Karl Mayländer =

Austrian art collector and businessman (1872–1941)

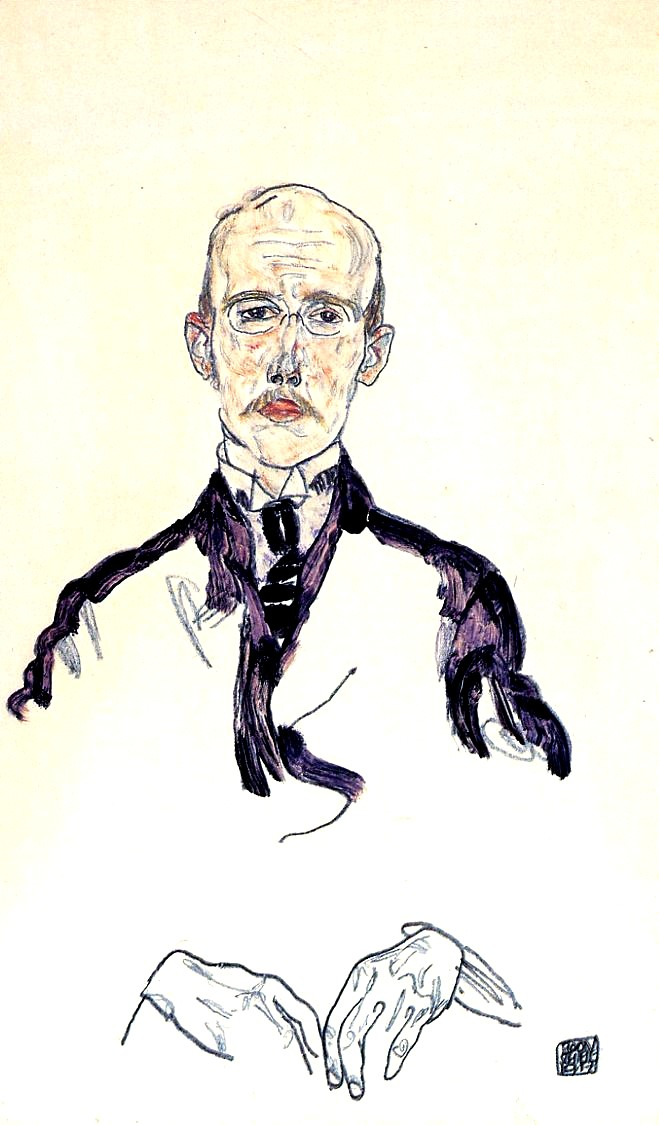
- Portrait of Karl Mayländer by Egon Schiele, 1917
- Born: 2 October 1872; Austria-Hungary
- Died: after 23 October 1941; Łódź, German-occupied Poland
- Cause of death: Murdered in the Holocaust
- Occupations: Art collector, art critic, businessman
- Known for: Collector of works by Egon Schiele; Holocaust victim; restitution cases involving Nazi-looted art

Karl Mayländer (2 October 1872 - deported 23 October 1941) was an Austrian art collector and businessman who was deported in 1941 from Vienna to Łódź, in German-occupied Poland, by the Nazis and later murdered in the Shoah.

== Professional life ==
Mayländer was an art collector and critic who was a member of the board of the Volksheim Ottakring (later the Volkshochschule Ottakring), an adult education school which also hosted art exhibitions. Mayländer acquired the work of many young Austrian artists, including many drawings by Egon Schiele whom he knew personally.

== Nazi persecution and murder ==
After Austria's Anschluss with Nazi Germany, Mäylander was persecuted because of his Jewish heritage. He was deported in 1941 from Vienna to Poland and murdered.

== Restitution claims for looted art ==
Art by Schiele owned by Mayländer has been the subject of restitution claims by his descendant in New York, Eva Zirkl. In 2010, an Austrian commission set up by the Austrian Federal Ministry of Arts, Education, and Culture investigated the ownership history, or provenance, of five paintings by Egon Schiele: "Girl with Sunglasses", "Portrait of Olga Gallus", "Proletrairan Children", "Portrait of Heinrich Benesch", and 'Portrait of a boy" and recommended that the paintings be restituted to Mayländer's heirs. However the commission had no authority to force a private museum like the Leopold Museum to follow its recommendations. In 2016, after negotiations, the Leopold Museum in Vienna agreed to return two of the five watercolour paintings by Schiele to Zirkl.

In 2020, Zirkl, then 98 years old, sued the estate of Robert (Robin) Lehman for Portrait of the Artist's Wife" by Egon Schiele, which had belonged to Mayländer before he was deported and killed.

Books were also looted from Mayländer and in 2017 the British Library restituted a copy of a German play that it realized had belonged to him.

== See also ==
List of claims for restitution for Nazi looted art

The Holocaust in Austria
