= Gert Kerschbaumer =

Austrian historian

Gert Kerschbaumer (born 27 January 1945 in Spital am Semmering) is an Austrian historian and German culture scholar.

Kerschbaumer has been living in Salzburg since the 1960s. He worked in industry and studied German literature and history at the same time. In addition to research and teaching activities, he has published on the subjects of art in the National Socialism and art theft, as well as works on Stefan Zweig.

== Publications ==
- Faszination Drittes Reich. Kunst und Alltag der Kulturmetropole Salzburg. Müller, Salzburg 1988, ISBN 3-7013-0732-6
- Meister des Verwirrens. Die Geschäfte des Kunsthändlers Friedrich Welz. (Die Bibliothek des Raubes, vol. 5) Czernin, Vienna 2000, ISBN 3-7076-0030-0
- with Karl Müller: Begnadet für das Schöne. Der rot-weiss-rote Kulturkampf gegen die Moderne. (contributions to culture studies, vol. 2) Verl. für Gesellschaftskritik, Vienna 1992 ISBN 3-85115-160-7
- Stefan Zweig. Der fliegende Salzburger. Residenz, Salzburg/Vienna 2003, ISBN 3-7017-1336-7
- Published with Jeffrey B. Berlin "Wenn einen Augenblick die Wolken weichen". Briefwechsel 1912–1942. S. Fischer, Frankfurt 2006, ISBN 978-3-10-097096-1
