= Temešvár =

- Municipality
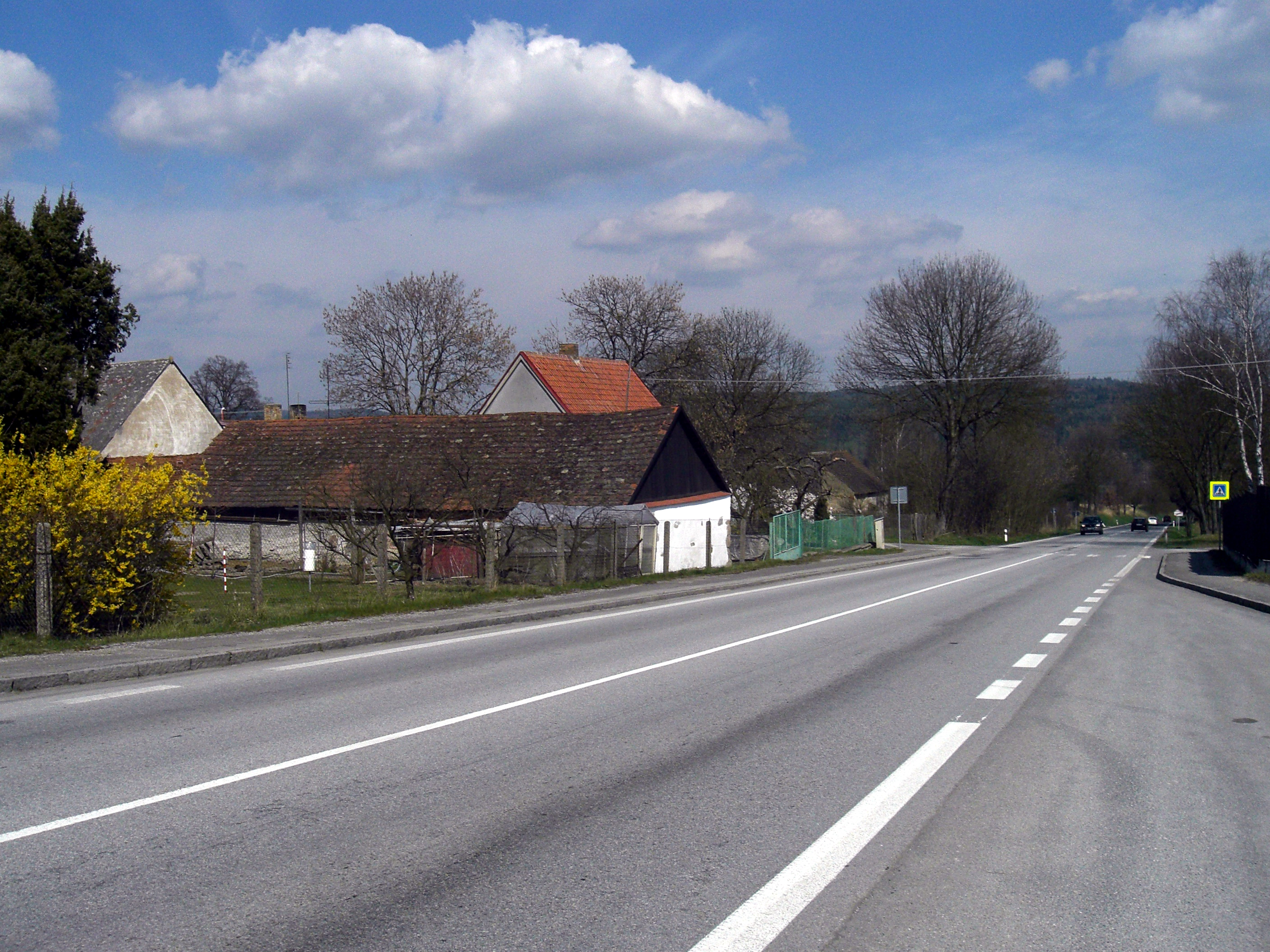
- Main road

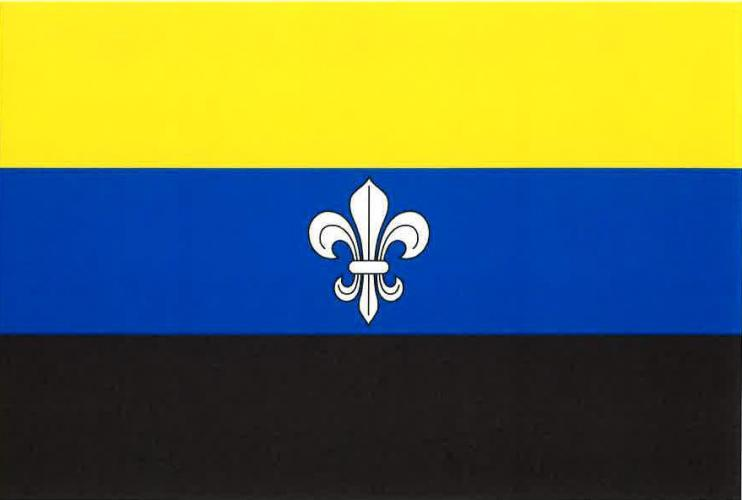
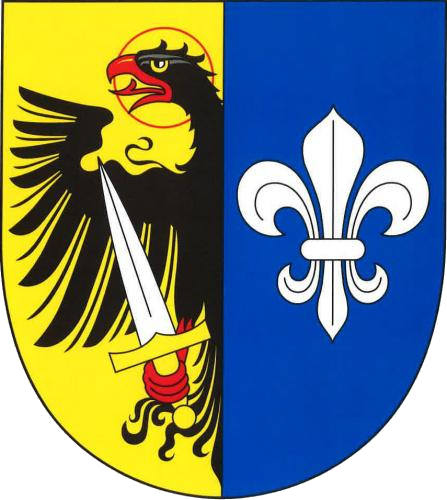
- Flag Coat of arms

- Location in the Czech Republic
- Coordinates: 49°21′23″N 14°15′49″E
- Country: Czech Republic
- Region: South Bohemian
- District: Písek
- First mentioned: 1717

Area
  - Total: 5.26 km^{2} (2.03 sq mi)
- Elevation: 414 m (1,358 ft)

Population (2026-01-01)
  - Total: 127
  - Density: 24.1/km^{2} (62.5/sq mi)
- Time zone: UTC+1 (CET)
  - Summer (DST): UTC+2 (CEST)
- Postal code: 397 01
- Website: www.temesvar.cz

Temešvár is a municipality and village in Písek District in the South Bohemian Region of the Czech Republic. It has about 100 inhabitants.

Temešvár lies approximately 12 kilometres (7 mi) north-east of Písek, 46 km (29 mi) north of České Budějovice, and 82 km (51 mi) south of Prague.

== Demographics ==
Historical population
Year	Pop.	±%
1869	268	—
1880	259	−3.4%
1890	280	+8.1%
1900	255	−8.9%
1910	252	−1.2%
1921	269	+6.7%
1930	223	−17.1%
1950	175	−21.5%
1961	160	−8.6%
1970	149	−6.9%
1980	127	−14.8%
1991	98	−22.8%
2001	87	−11.2%
2011	118	+35.6%
2021	114	−3.4%
Source: Censuses
