= Otto Gutekunst =

British art dealer

Otto Charles Henry Gutekunst (1866 – 17 February 1947) was a British art dealer and collector, and a co-owner of P. & D. Colnaghi & Co. from 1894.

== Early life ==
He was born in Stuttgart, Germany, the eldest son of Heinrich Gottlob Gutekunst, a German art dealer in Stuttgart, himself the son of an artist. Heinrich's younger son Richard Gutekunst was also an art dealer, particularly in prints.

== Career ==
In the 1890s, Gutekunst and Edmund Deprez formed a partnership as Deprez and Gutekunst, with a gallery in London's Charing Cross Road. In 1894, Gutekunst was taken into partnership by William McKay and became a co-owner of P. & D. Colnaghi & Co.

In 1947, his widow Lena sold Rubens' Venus supplicating Jupiter to Sir Alfred Beit, 2nd Baronet.

In 1947, his widow Lena gave Giovanni Ambrogio de Predis' Profile Portrait of a Lady to the National Gallery, London.

In 1950, the Saint Louis Art Museum acquired Rembrandt's Portrait of a Young Man from Gutekunst's collection for US$130,000, its most expensive purchase to date.

== Personal life ==
In 1892, he married Lina Louise S Obach in London. In 1901, they were living in Streatham, London. In 1911, they were living in Marylebone, London, with her parents and five servants.

He retired to Switzerland and died there on 17 February 1947.
