= Arthur Roessler =

Austrian art critic (1877–1950)

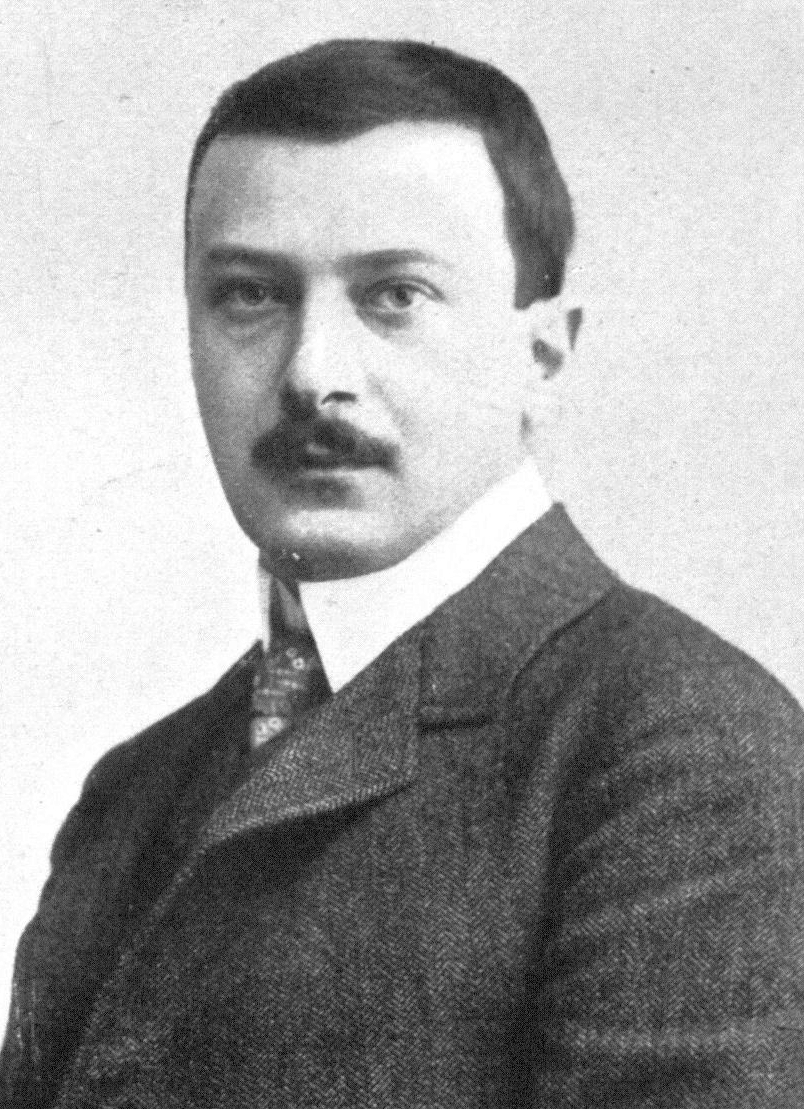
Arthur Roessler c. 1911

Arthur Roessler, also spelled Rössler, (20 February 1877 – 20 July 1950) was an Austrian art critic, art historian, and essayist.

== Biography ==
Roessler was born in to the family of a chemist and engineer. He studied philosophy, literature, and art history at the University of Vienna under Franz Wickhoff, but did not defend his doctoral thesis. He travelled around Europe and settled in Munich, where he worked as a journalist for the Münchner Zeitung.

He married the translator Ida Lange (1877-1961)

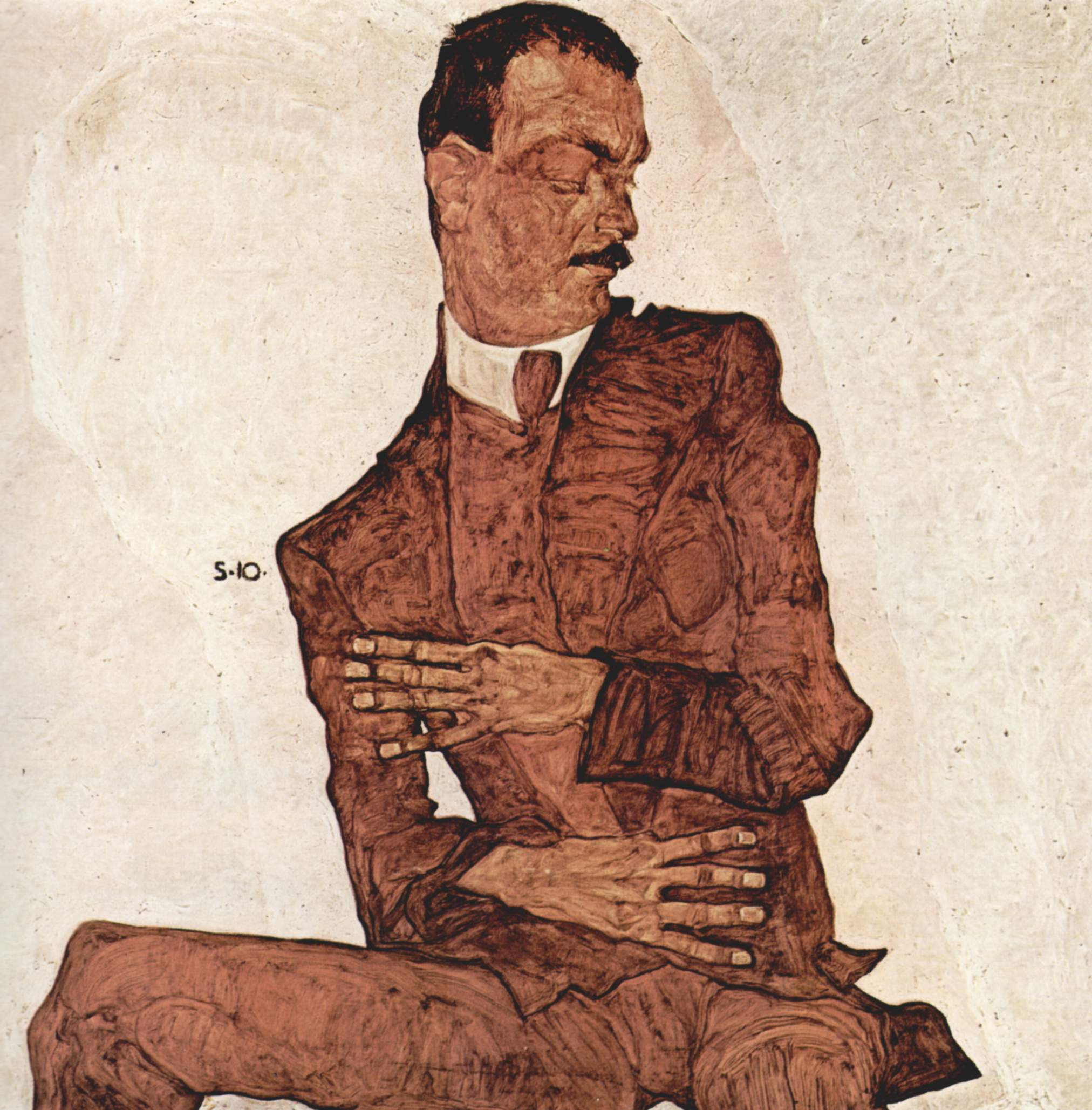
Portrait of Arthur Rössler by Egon Schiele

Roessler's first major essay, Die Stimmung der Gotik", was published in 1903. Two years later, he published a new essay, about the Dachau artists' colony (Künstlergruppe Neu-Dachau) and Adolf Hölzel, a pioneer of modernism. Thanks to the latter, he settled in Vienna and took over the management of the Miethke gallery. He continued to promote many young modernist artists through numerous collaborations with art magazines. His friendship with Victor Adler led him to write for the social-democratic newspaper Arbeiter-Zeitung, in whose columns he was the first to recognise and defend Egon Schiele which led the two men to become close friends. Schiele left several portraits of Roessler.

Between the two wars, Roessler became vice-president of the Wiener Werkstätte, and director of the Österreichische Werkbund (ÖWB).

In 1937, he was awarded the title of professor by government of Austria.

== Nazi era Anschluss ==
After Austria was annexed by Nazi Germany, Roessler a supporter of Austrian modernism and social democracy, came under scrutiny from the new regime and was accused of being a "Mischling" under the Nazi racial laws which forbade him to work. Under the Nuremberg Laws (1935), “Mischling” was a term used for people with mixed “Aryan” and “non-Aryan” (often Jewish) ancestry.

Roessler and his wife Ida remained in Vienna during the Second World War and after the war ended he continued his work as a freelance writer and critic.

Arthur Roessler died in Vienna on 20 July 1955; his grave is in the Vienna Central Cemetery.
