= Richard Gutekunst =

German art dealer

- Born: Richard Georg Gutekunst; 24 June 1870; Stuttgart, Germany
- Died: 8 July 1961 (aged 91); Riehen, Switzerland
- Occupation: Art dealer
- Spouse: Marie Viktoria Gundert
- Relatives: Otto Gutekunst (brother); Otto Tschumi (son-in-law)

Richard Georg Gutekunst (24 June 1870 – 8 July 1961) was a German art dealer, particularly of prints.

He was the son of H G Gutekunst and younger brother of Otto Gutekunst, both art dealers. He was born on 24 June 1870 in Stuttgart.

From 1890 to 1893, he worked for his brother's London firm, Deprez and Gutekunst, but when they joined with Colnaghi, he started his own specialist print firm in Grafton Street, London in 1895. In 1914, his entire stock and private collection were confiscated as enemy property by the British government. They were finally auctioned in December 1920, "By order of the Public Trustee - Trading with the Enemy - R. Gutekunst".

In 1919, Gutekunst established a new print firm in Basel, Switzerland with Dr August Klipstein (1885–1951), and they opened to the public in Bern in 1920 at Hotelgasse 8 near the Zytglogge, dealing in art, and organising exhibitions.

He was married to Marie Viktoria Gundert (1870–1952), and they had a daughter, Beatrice Gutekunst, who married the Swiss surrealist artist Otto Tschumi.

Gutekunst retired in 1928, and Klipstein continued alone. He died in Riehen near Basel, Switzerland in 1961.
