= Portrait of Wally =

Painting by Egon Schiele

- Porträt von Wally (German)
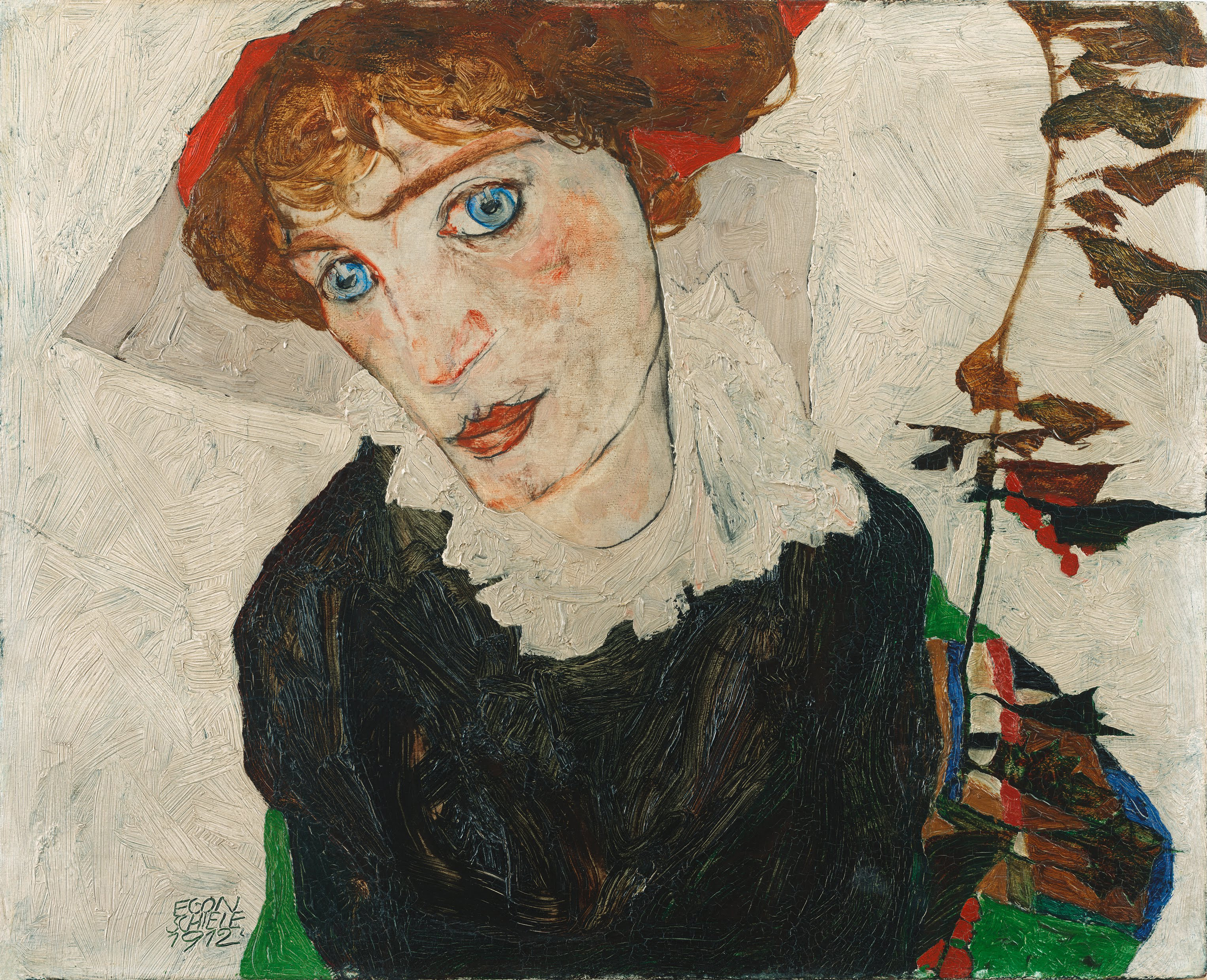
- Artist: Egon Schiele
- Year: 1912
- Medium: Oil on panel
- Dimensions: 32 cm × 39.8 cm (13 in × 15.7 in)
- Location: Leopold Museum, Vienna

Portrait of Wally is a 1912 oil painting by Austrian painter Egon Schiele of Walburga "Wally" Neuzil, a woman whom he met in 1911 when he was 21 and she was 17. She became his lover and model for several years, depicted in a number of Schiele's most striking paintings. The painting was obtained by Rudolf Leopold in 1954 and became part of the collection of the Leopold Museum when it was established by the Austrian government, purchasing 5,000 pieces that Leopold had owned. Near the end of a 1997–1998 exhibit of Schiele's work at the Museum of Modern Art in New York, the painting's ownership (provenance) history was revealed in an article published in The New York Times. After the publication, the heirs of Lea Bondi Jaray, to whom the work had belonged before World War II, contacted the New York County District Attorney who issued a subpoena forbidding its return to Austria. The work was tied up in litigation for years by Bondi's heirs, who claimed that the painting was Nazi plunder and should have been returned to them.

In July 2010, the Leopold Museum agreed to pay $19 million to Bondi's heirs under an agreement that would address all outstanding claims on the painting.

== Relationship with Neuzil ==
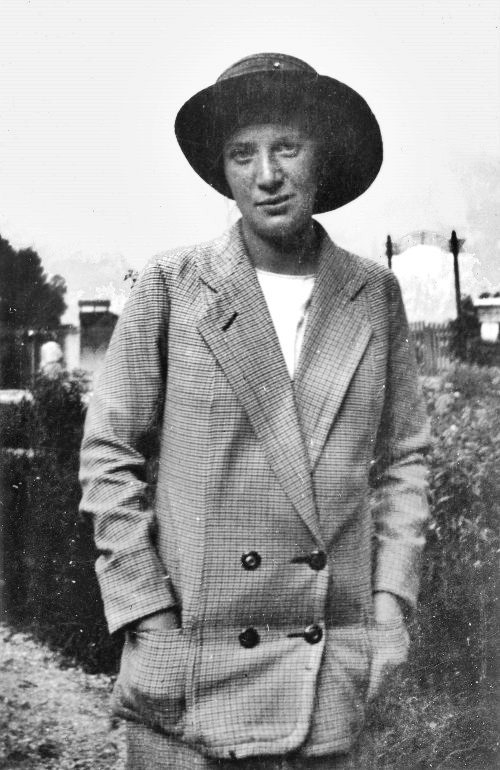
Walburga Neuzil

In 1911, Schiele met the seventeen-year-old Walburga (Wally) Neuzil, who moved in with him in Vienna and modeled for him. Very little is known of her; she may have previously modelled for Gustav Klimt and might have been one of Klimt's mistresses. Schiele and Wally wanted to escape what they perceived as the claustrophobic Viennese milieu, and went to the small town of Český Krumlov (Krumau) in southern Bohemia. Although Krumau was the birthplace of Schiele's mother (and is today the site of a Schiele museum), he and his lover were driven out of the town by the residents, who strongly disapproved of their lifestyle which included his alleged employment of the town's teenage girls as models.

Together they moved to Neulengbach, 35 km west of Vienna, seeking inspirational surroundings and an inexpensive studio in which to work. As it was in the capital, Schiele's studio became a gathering place for Neulengbach's delinquent children. Schiele's way of life aroused much animosity among the town's inhabitants, and in April 1912 he was arrested and jailed for seducing a young girl below the age of consent, and more than a hundred of his drawings were seized as pornographic. Although the charge of seduction was dropped, he was found guilty of exhibiting erotic drawings in a place accessible to children and sentenced to 3 additional days in jail besides the 3 weeks already served.

In 1914, Schiele had a studio in the Viennese suburb of Hietzing. Across the street was a middle-class, Protestant locksmith family which included the sisters Edith and Adéle Harms. In February 1915, Schiele wrote a note to a friend stating: "I intend to get married, advantageously. Not to Wally." When he told Wally, she left him immediately and never saw him again. Around this time he painted Death and the Maiden, where Wally's portrait is based on a previous work, but Schiele's is new. Schiele and Edith Harms did get married on 17 June 1915.

After leaving Schiele, Neuzil trained as a nurse and worked at a military hospital in Vienna. In 1917 she was working in the Dalmatia region of Croatia, and died there on December 25 of scarlet fever.

== Early ownership and Nazi seizure ==
As outlined in a 1997 article by Judith H. Dobrzynski in The New York Times, the painting had been owned by Lea Bondi Jaray, a Jewish art dealer who was fleeing the German annexation of Austria and the Aryanization program, and had under duress given up the painting to art dealer Friedrich Welz in 1939. While Bondi's art gallery had already been "Aryanized" and all paintings seized, Welz had seen the painting in Bondi's apartment, where it was part of her private collection, and demanded that she turn it over to him. As they were to be fleeing the country any day, her husband convinced her to turn the painting over to Welz, saying "you know what he can do." Welz also forced Dr. Heinrich Rieger to sell his collection of Schiele paintings before Rieger was deported to the Theresienstadt concentration camp, where he was murdered on October 21, 1942.

== Efforts at recovery ==
After the end of World War II, the United States Army seized Welz and recovered the paintings that he had accumulated during the war. The Portrait of Wally was mixed in with the other Schiele paintings from Rieger's collection, which were all turned over to the Austrian government. The Österreichische Galerie Belvedere (Austrian National Gallery) purchased the Schiele works from Rieger's heirs, which erroneously included the Portrait of Wally because of a clerical error by the U.S. forces, listing the painting as Rieger's. The museum was informed of the mistake, that the painting had not belonged to Rieger. After Bondi recovered ownership of her Vienna art gallery in 1946, she contacted Welz, who told her the painting had been turned over to the Austrian National Gallery. Bondi recounted that she had met Rudolph Leopold in London in 1953 and asked for his assistance in retrieving the painting from the museum, offering to help him acquire other works by Schiele. Bondi later discovered that Leopold had purchased the painting from the museum for himself in 1954. Leopold's 1972 catalogue raisonné of Schiele's works omits Lea Bondi from the list of provenance, despite an earlier catalogue by Otto Kallir citing her as the last owner in the 1930s. Bondi died in 1969 and her heirs picked up the trail she had been following.

In 1994, Portrait of Wally was among 5,400 works in Leopold's art collection purchased for $500 million by the Austrian government and used to create the Leopold Museum, with Leopold named as director for life, a position he served in until his death in June 2010. In a 1995 catalogue of works by Schiele, Leopold inserted the claim that the picture had been part of the Rieger collection that he had earlier acquired from the Austrian National Gallery. The Leopold Museum included the painting in a group of works exhibited from October 8, 1997, to January 4, 1998, at the Museum of Modern Art.

== Legal proceedings ==
New York County District Attorney Robert M. Morgenthau subpoenaed the Portrait of Wally together with another Schiele painting in January 1998, claiming that they had been improperly acquired Nazi loot. In September 1999, the New York Court of Appeals rejected Morgenthau's claim that he could seize the paintings under state law, whereupon the United States Customs Service seized the paintings under federal law.

In legal proceedings, the museum stated that Bondi had decided to drop the matter in 1954 and that there was no evidence to show that Leopold knew that the painting had been Nazi plunder when he acquired it. The heirs of the Bondi family maintained that Bondi had made multiple efforts to recover the painting, which were continued after her death.

In October 2009, after more than a decade of proceedings and legal wrangling, United States District Court for the Southern District of New York Judge Loretta A. Preska ruled that there was enough evidence regarding the ownership of the painting to allow a trial to proceed, saying that the Leopold Museum was aware of the painting's questionable provenance when it sent the picture to the Museum of Modern Art 12 years earlier. At trial, a jury would determine if there was sufficient evidence to show that Leopold had known the painting was stolen when it was brought for exhibit to the United States.

In early July 2010, sources indicated to The Art Newspaper that the Bondi estate would accept $20 million as restitution for the painting in a deal completed shortly before Leopold's death the previous month, weeks before a civil trial was scheduled to start in United States District Court. Under the terms of the deal, the painting would be returned to the Leopold Museum, where it would be hung together with a Schiele self-portrait that has been used as a logo for the museum. By July 21, 2010, the Leopold Museum and the Bondi estate agreed upon a settlement of $19 million.

The history of the painting and the legal efforts by the Bondi heirs to recover it are the subject of the 2012 documentary Portrait of Wally by filmmaker Andrew Shea.

== See also ==
- Nazi plunder
- Degenerate art
- The Holocaust in Austria
- Documentary film "Portrait of Wally" (2012) about the court case to recover this painting
