= Rudolf Leopold =

Austrian art collector

Rudolf Leopold (March 1, 1925 – June 29, 2010) was an Austrian art collector whose collection, comprising more than 5,000 works of art, was established as a private foundation in 1994. The foundation was created and financed by the Government of Austria, the National Bank of Austria, and the collector himself. This private foundation became the foundation for the Leopold Museum in Vienna, where Rudolf Leopold was appointed lifelong director. The collection's art-historical focus, primarily consisting of works from the early 19th century to 1938, centers around the paintings of Egon Schiele. The Leopold Museum houses the world's largest and most significant collection of Schiele's work, alongside masterpieces by other major Austrian artists of the period, such as Gustav Klimt and Oskar Kokoschka. The museum also displays Secessionist-style crafts, furniture, and design. Today, the Leopold Museum stands as the leading institution for showcasing a representative overview of the art of "Vienna 1900," in all its forms and media.

In 2006, Jewish Holocaust survivors made claims that certain pieces in the collection—two oil paintings and five works on paper by Egon Schiele, as well as five minor works by Anton Romako—were looted by the Nazis and should be returned to their rightful owners, or resolved according to the so-called Washington Principles on Nazi-Confiscated Art. All these claims have since been settled.

== Biography ==
Rudolf Leopold was born on 1 March 1925 in Vienna into a middle-class family with ties to the Christian Social Party of Chancellor Engelbert Dollfuß (1932-1934), who was assassinated by Austrian Nazis. Following the Anschluss, the incorporation of Austria into Nazi Germany, Leopold’s uncle, August Kargl, a prominent politician in Lower Austria, was deported to the Mauthausen concentration camp. Released after three months, Kargl lost all his public positions but managed to rescue several Jewish families by integrating them into his family enterprise. As a visible tribute to him, the families donated ten trees, which were planted by the Jewish National Fund in "eternal memory of this friend of mankind" and are now part of Mount Herzl near Jerusalem.

At 14, when World War II began, Rudolf Leopold evaded Nazi conscription by hiding in a remote Austrian village. After the war, he studied medicine at the Medical University of Vienna, earning his degree in 1953. That same year, he married Elisabeth Schmid, with whom he had three children: Rudolf, Diethard, and Gerda.

Leopold’s artistic inclinations were initially channeled through music, playing piano and the organ. A pivotal moment in 1947 during a visit to the Kunsthistorisches Museum in Vienna inspired him to begin collecting art, focusing on 19th-century Austrian landscape paintings in the "atmospheric Impressionism" style. He funded his early acquisitions through tutoring.

In 1950, Leopold discovered Egon Schiele’s work through a 1930 catalogue by Otto Nirenstein and became captivated by Schiele’s art, despite its lack of popularity at the time. He sold his initial collection to focus on Schiele, researching the artist’s life and locating key works. At the time, Schiele's artworks were relatively inexpensive, but Leopold's collecting activities eventually drove up their value significantly. By the late 1950s, his collection included the majority of the Schiele works that would later form the core of the Leopold Museum’s holdings.

Leopold was instrumental in reinterpreting Schiele’s early, expressionist works (1910-1914), transforming perceptions of his controversial nude drawings from pornographic to psychologically and existentially significant. This re-evaluation elevated Schiele’s figurative paintings to a central place in modern art history.

Leopold’s lifelong research culminated in the seminal monograph "Egon Schiele – Paintings, Watercolours, Drawings" (1972, German; 1973, English), which provided detailed analyses and over 200 illustrations. The monograph was reprinted in 2020 and 2022 with updated provenance research.

The Leopold Collection spans Austrian art from the late Baroque to the early 20th century, peaking with the Secessionist movement (1895-1918), featuring artists such as Gustav Klimt, Oskar Kokoschka, and others. The collection highlights Austrian Expressionism’s distinct aesthetic and its dialogue with applied arts, bridging fine art and cultural history up to World War I.

In 1994, the Austrian government facilitated the transformation of Leopold’s collection into the Leopold Museum Private Foundation. The museum, subsidized by the Austrian state, opened in 2001 with Leopold serving as its director for life. The collection’s initial valuation was approximately $500 million, a figure that has since increased significantly.

Rudolf Leopold resided in Grinzing, a Vienna suburb, with his wife Elisabeth until his death on 29 June 2010. He was awarded the Austrian Cross of Honour for Science and Art, 1st Class, in 1997. He is remembered as Austria’s foremost 20th-century art collector and the founder of one of the world’s most significant museums, as noted by The Times in 2013.

== Problematic provenances from the Nazi era ==
The 1997 exhibition "Egon Schiele: The Leopold Collection," held at the Museum of Modern Art (MoMA) in New York City, brought attention to the provenance of artworks collected by Rudolf Leopold. Two pieces in particular drew scrutiny due to their contested ownership history. In his review for The New York Times, Holland Cotter highlighted that Egon Schiele's works, often noted for their "X-rated subject matter," were rarely displayed in U.S. museums.

Later that year, Judith H. Dobrzynski published an investigative article uncovering Leopold's controversial acquisition practices, including his connection to Lea Bondi Jaray, the original owner of Schiele's Portrait of Wally before World War II. Dobrzynski's revelations led Bondi Jaray's heirs to request that the painting remain in New York instead of being returned to the Leopold Museum.

Other claims of Nazi-era looted art emerged in connection with the Leopold Collection. Schiele's Dead City III was claimed by the heirs of Fritz Grünbaum, an artist murdered in 1941 at the Dachau concentration camp. Similarly, Portrait of Wally, depicting Walburga "Wally" Neuzil, was claimed by the family of Lea Bondi Jaray, a Jewish art dealer from Austria who fled to London to escape Nazi persecution. In January 1998, Manhattan District Attorney Robert M. Morgenthau issued a subpoena to MoMA, instructing the museum to retain the disputed artworks and refrain from returning them to the Leopold Museum. This legal intervention sent shockwaves through the art world.

Rudolf Leopold denied allegations of dealing in looted art, stating, "I'm not a Nazi and I'm not a Nazi profiteer." While "Dead City III" was eventually returned to the Leopold Museum, "Portrait of Wally" became the subject of a prolonged legal dispute in U.S. federal and state courts, with Bondi Jaray's heirs alleging that Leopold knowingly acquired the painting despite its status as Nazi-looted art.

A 2008 investigation commissioned by a group of Austrian Jews identified at least 11 artworks in the Leopold Museum that had belonged to victims of Nazi persecution. The study concluded that Leopold had reason to suspect their origins. In a positive response to these findings the Federal Ministry for Education, Arts and Culture and the Leopold Museum Private Foundation, with the explicit support of Rudolf Leopold, established a joint provenance research initiative in May 2008. Its goal, both then and now, is to independently investigate and document the provenance of the museum's entire collection. The research findings are continuously published as dossiers on individual works.

Leopold expressed willingness to pursue settlements if the research confirmed Nazi-looted origins. By 2016, all 12 outstanding cases had been resolved, fulfilling the commitment of the museum’s late director to address these historical injustices.

== See also ==
- List of claims for restitution for Nazi-looted art
- Heinrich Rieger
- Eberhard W. Kornfeld
