= Eberhard W. Kornfeld =

Swiss art dealer and collector (1923–2023)

- Born: September 23, 1923; Basel, Switzerland
- Died: April 13, 2023 (aged 99); Ostermundigen, Switzerland
- Occupations: Auctioneer, author, art dealer, collector

Eberhard W. Kornfeld (23 September 1923 – 13 April 2023) was a Swiss auctioneer, author, art dealer, and collector based in Bern.

== Early life ==
Eberhard W. Kornfeld was born in Basel on 23 September 1923. After a commercial apprenticeship with a local architect he started to work in January 1945 for August Klipstein in Bern who headed the auction house Gutekunst & Klipstein dating back to 1864.

== Art career ==
The sudden death of August Klipstein in 1951 was a chance for the young Kornfeld to take over the lead of the house. The name changed from Klipstein & Kornfeld, to Kornfeld & Klipstein and finally to Galerie Kornfeld.

== Controversies ==
Kornfeld was involved in numerous controversies. In 1993 a lawsuit opposed him and David P. Tunick, a Manhattan dealer concerning the authenticity of a signature. In 2017, it was discovered that the son of Adolf Hitler's art dealer Hildebrand Gurlitt had been selling artworks from his secret stash in Munich through Kornfeld in Switzerland. Kornfeld denied selling Nazi looted art. In 2018, the heirs to other Jewish collectors who had been looted, August et Serena Lederer, got a court order to compel Kornfeld to supply information about a Schiele painting they had owned. In 2019 a judge ordered that two Schieles that Kornfeld had sold be restituted to the heirs of a Holocaust victim Fritz Grünbaum because they had been looted by Nazis.

In September 2023 the Manhattan DA seized several Schiele paintings that Kornfeld had sold to Otto Kallir's NYC-based Galerie St. Etienne, "with no provenance whatsoever". After an investigation by Assistant District Attorney Matthew Bogdanos, Chief of the Antiquities Trafficking Unit, Assistant District Attorney Edward Smith, Investigative Analyst Hilary Chassé, and Special Agents Megan Buckley and Robert Mancene of Homeland Security Investigations, "all seven drawings were seized and voluntarily surrendered by the holding institutions and estates after they were presented with evidence that they were stolen by the Nazis. The Art Institute of Chicago refused, citing Kornfeld's story that he had purchased the Schiele known as The Russian Prisoner legally and denying evidence that Kornfeld had forged the signature of Mathilde Lukacs on a document. In February 2024, the Manhattan DA filed a 160 page motion accusing the Art Institute of Chicago of "willful blindess" and detailing the evidence that Kornfeld had falsified the provenance in order to conceal the sale of art looted from the Jewish Holocaust victim Fritz Grünbuaum.

== Philanthropy ==
Kornfeld donated artworks to several museums, including the National Gallery of Art, the Norton Simon Museum, the Calder Foundation, the MoMa, and the Kunstmuseum Basel.

== Death ==
Kornfeld died in Ostermundigen on 13 April 2023, at the age of 99.

== Distinctions ==
- 1982: Honorary doctorate of the University of Bern
- 1984: Order of Merit of the Federal Republic of Germany
- 1991: Knight of the French Ordre des Arts et des Lettres
- 2004: Honorary citizen of Davos
- 2011: Honorary citizen of Bern

== Literature ==
- Christine Ekelhart, Klaus Albrecht Schröder: Wege der Moderne: Aus der Sammlung Eberhard W. Kornfeld. Brandstätter, Vienna/Munich 2008, ISBN 978-3-85033-264-4.
- Eberhard W. Kornfeld: Ernst Ludwig Kirchner: Nachzeichnung seines Lebens. Katalog der Sammlung Kirchner-Haus Davos. Kornfeld Verlag, Bern 1979, ISBN 3-8577-3010-2.
- Eberhard W. Kornfeld: Paul Klee: Verzeichnis des graphischen Werkes. Kornfeld Verlag, Bern 2005, ISBN 978-3-85773-046-7.

== Exhibitions ==
- 2009: Wege der Moderne: Aus der Sammlung Eberhard W. Kornfeld, Albertina, Vienna

== See also ==
- Cornelius Gurlitt
- List of claims for restitution for Nazi-looted art
- Otto Kallir
