= Leopold Museum =

Museum of modern Austrian art in Vienna, Austria

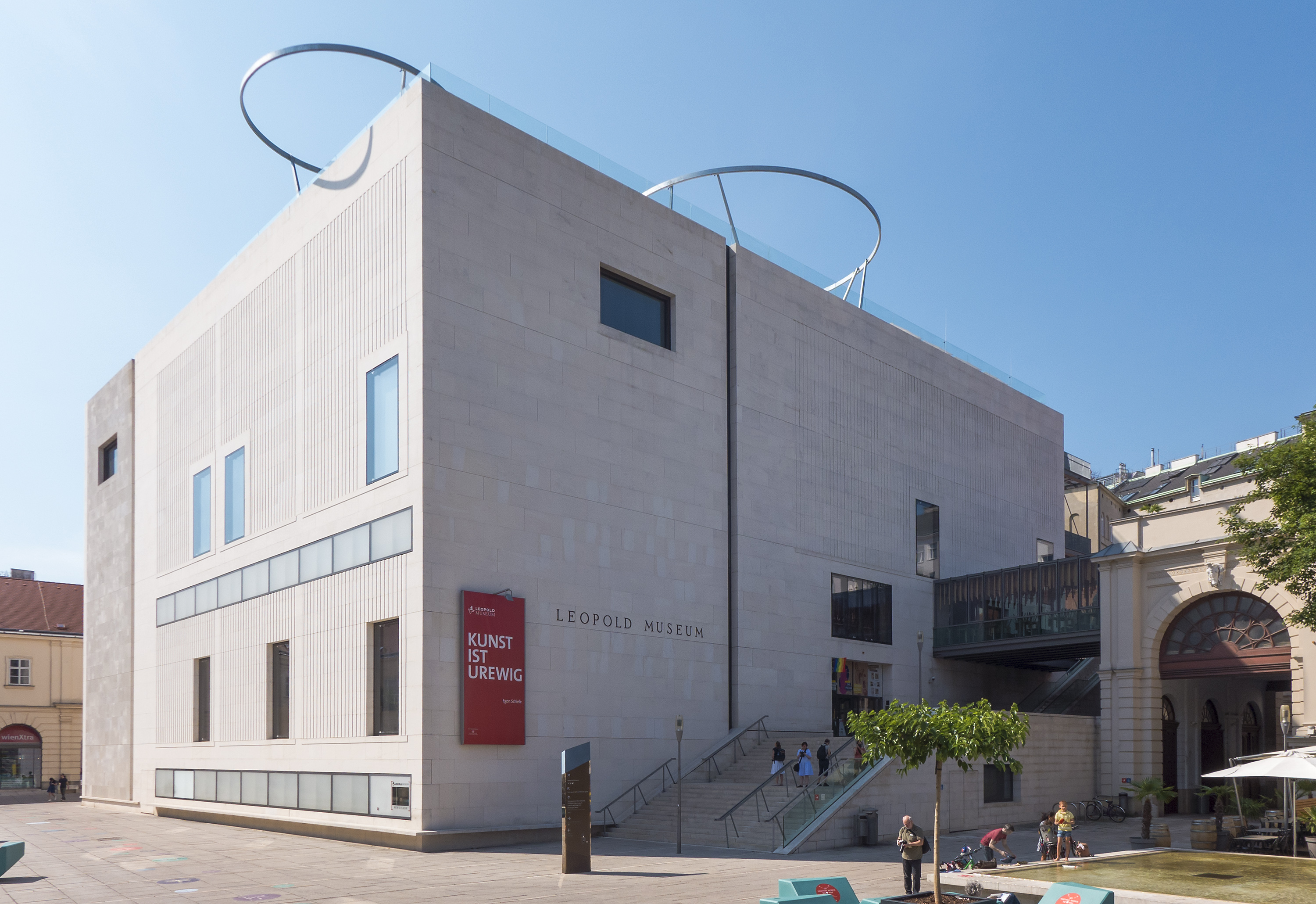
- Leopold Museum
- Interactive fullscreen map
- Location: Vienna, Austria
- Coordinates: 48°12′10″N 16°21′33″E
- Type: Austrian art

The Leopold Museum is a modern art museum housed in the Museumsquartier in Vienna, Austria. It was founded in 2001 by art collector Rudolf Leopold. It is home to one of the largest collections of modern Austrian art, featuring artists such as Egon Schiele, Gustav Klimt, Oskar Kokoschka, and Richard Gerstl. It contains the world's largest Egon Schiele Collection.

== Collection ==
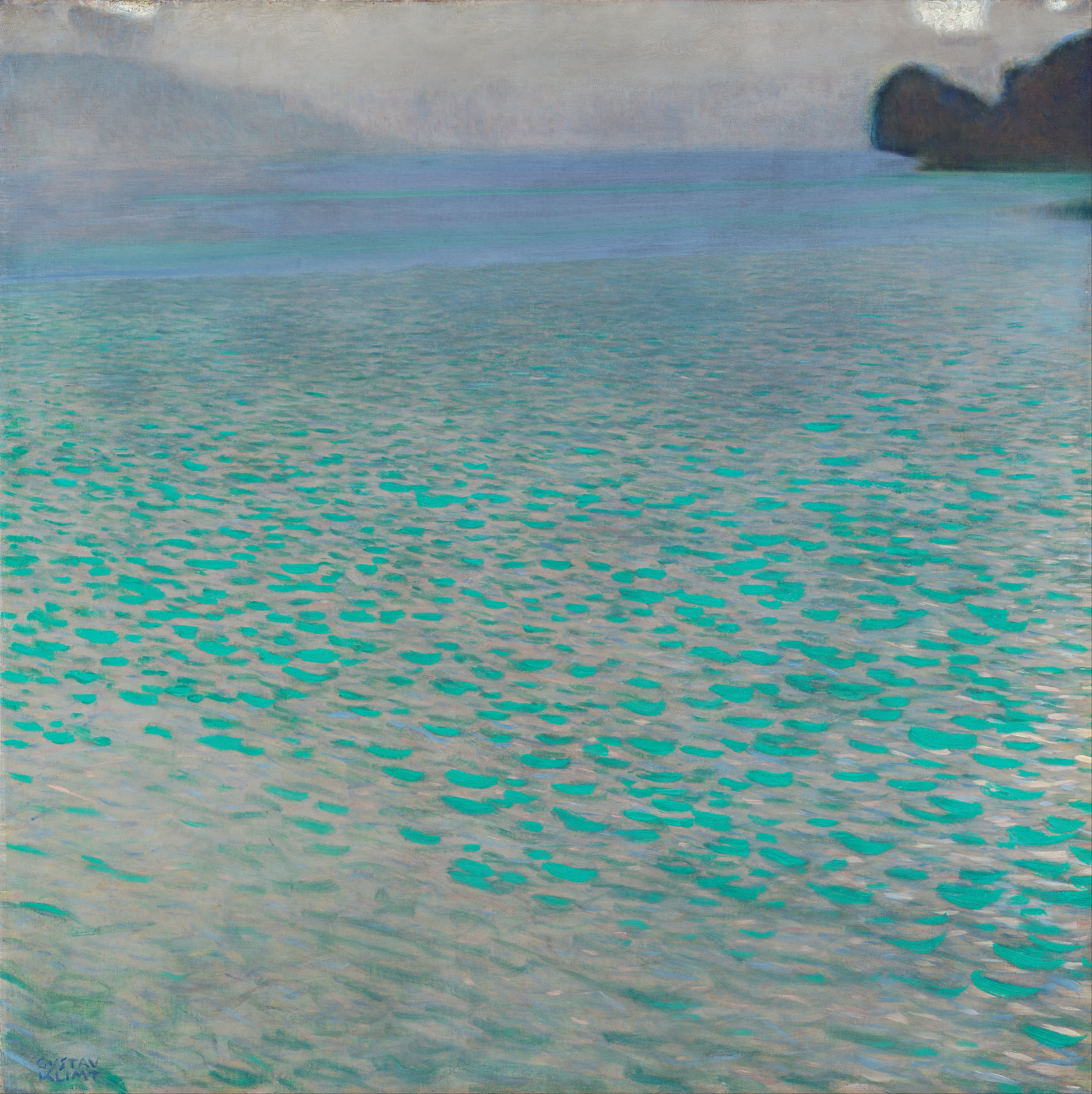
Gustav Klimt Attersee

The more than 5,000 exhibits collected by Elisabeth and Rudolf Leopold over five decades were consolidated in 1994 with the assistance of the Republic of Austria and the National Bank of Austria into the Leopold Museum Private Foundation. In 2001 the Leopold Museum was opened.

The core of the collection consists of Austrian art of the first half of the 20th century, including key paintings and drawings by Egon Schiele and Gustav Klimt, showing the gradual transformation from the Wiener Secession, the Art Nouveau/Jugendstil movement in Austria to Expressionism. The historical context is illustrated by major Austrian works of art from the 19th and 20th centuries.

== Nazi-looted art ==
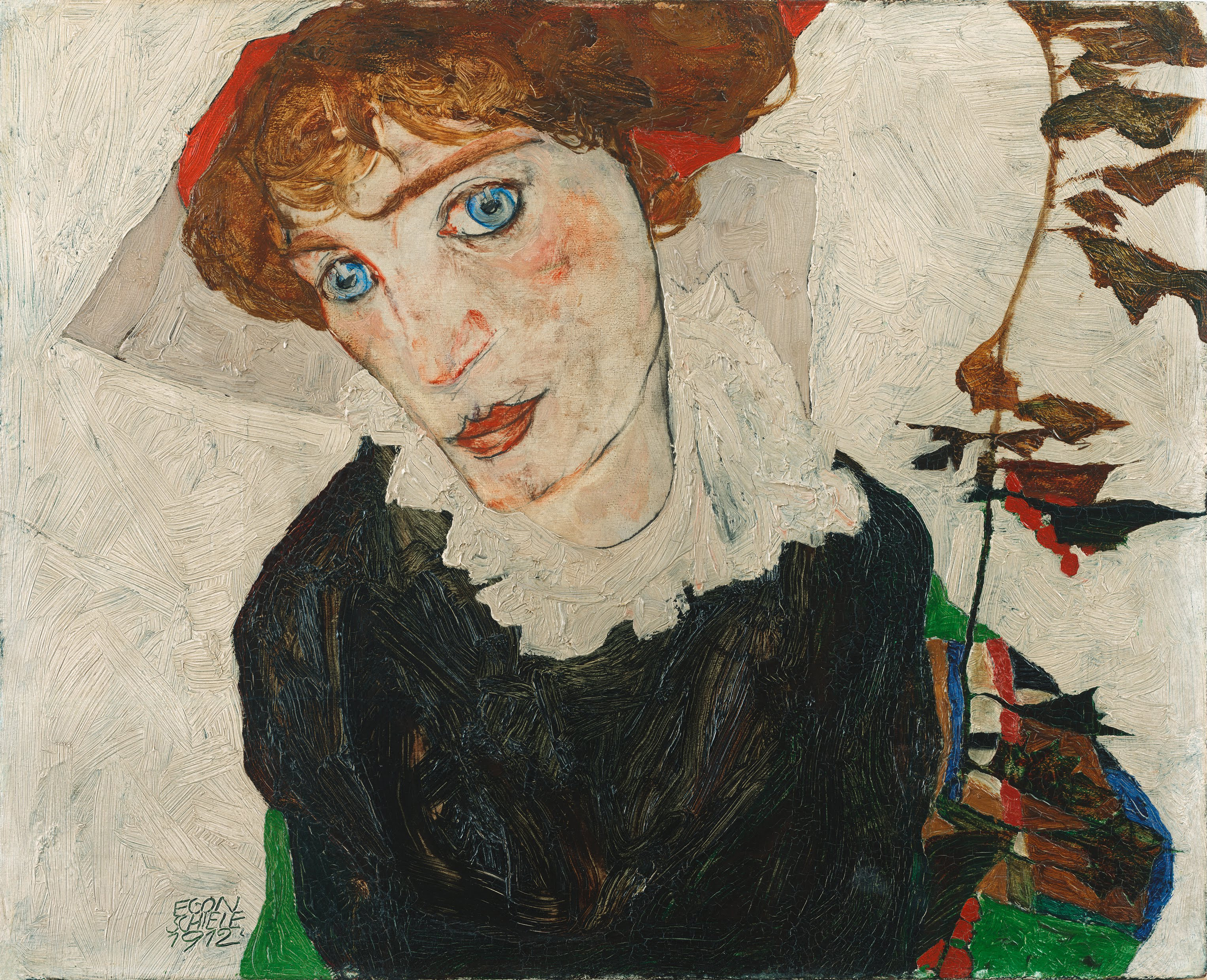
Egon Schiele, Portrait of Wally Neuzil

The Leopold Museum has been involved in numerous controversies concerning Nazi-looted art. In 1997, a New York Times profile of Leopold described him as a "too passionate" collector, whose tough tactics had led him to keep Nazi looted art, including Schiele's Portrait of Wally, which had belonged to the Jewish art dealer Lea Bondi Jaray. After many dramatic court actions, a settlement was finally reached after Dr. Leopold's death. "Leopold knew the painting was stolen," art lawyer Nicolas O’Donnell explained, "He had always known it. With his arrogance and pride out of the way, a real negotiation was possible."

In 2008, Austria's Green Party and the Israelitische Kultusgemeinde (IKG) publicly accused the museum of "holding art that was stolen by Nazis from Jewish owners" alleging that Houses on the Lake, 1914, by Egon Schiele, had been "stolen by the Nazis from Jewish owner Jenny Steiner".

In June 2011, the museum reached a settlement with the heirs of Moriz Eisler, an art collector and businessman for the paintings "Greillenstein Castle" and "Countess Kuefstein at the Easel," by 19th-century Austrian artist Anton Romako. In 2016, after fighting against restitution for "nearly twenty years", the museum reached a settlement concerning five works by Schiele with the heirs of Karl Maylaender, who died after being deported to a labor camp during World War Two. In November 2023 the heirs of Fritz Grünbaum filed a lawsuit against the museum demanding the restitution of Schiele's Dead City III, Self-Portrait With Grimace (1910), Standing Man in Red Shawl (1913), Seated Girl With Yellow Cloth (1913) and Standing Girl With Orange Stockings (1914). Grünbaum, a Jewish cabaret artist and art collector, was murdered in the Holocaust, as was his wife.

== Naked Men ==
In 2012, following a public outcry, the museum's largest street posters for the Nackte Männer (English: Naked Men) exhibition by Ilse Haider, displaying one of the exhibition's most prominent artworks, entitled Vive la France (a depiction of three naked French footballers, with their genitals fully revealed: the first black, the second Arab/Muslim and the third white, by the French artists Pierre et Gilles), were amended by the artists themselves, by the addition of a red ribbon or stripe to cover the players' genitals.

== Gallery ==
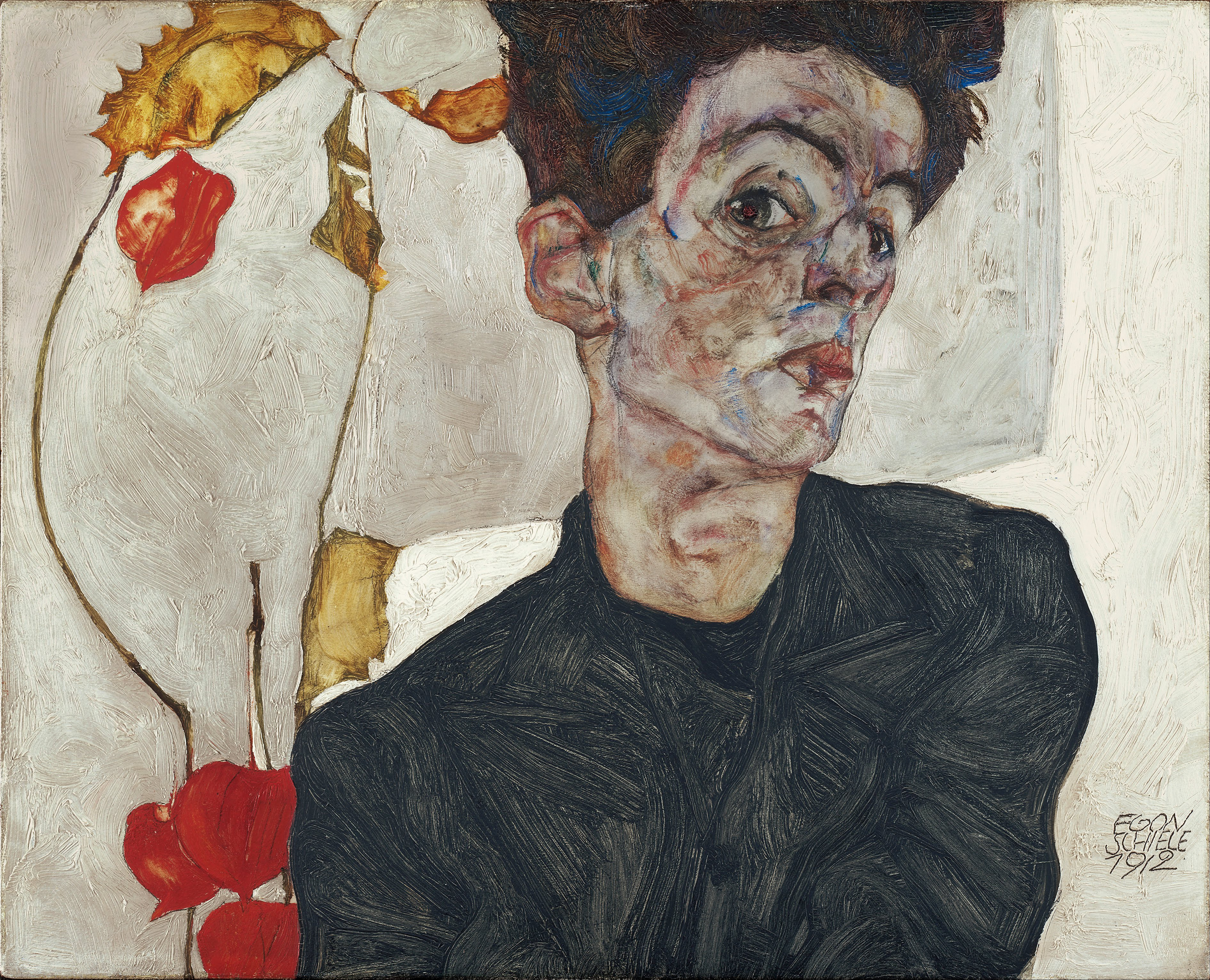
Egon Schiele
Self-Portrait with Physalis

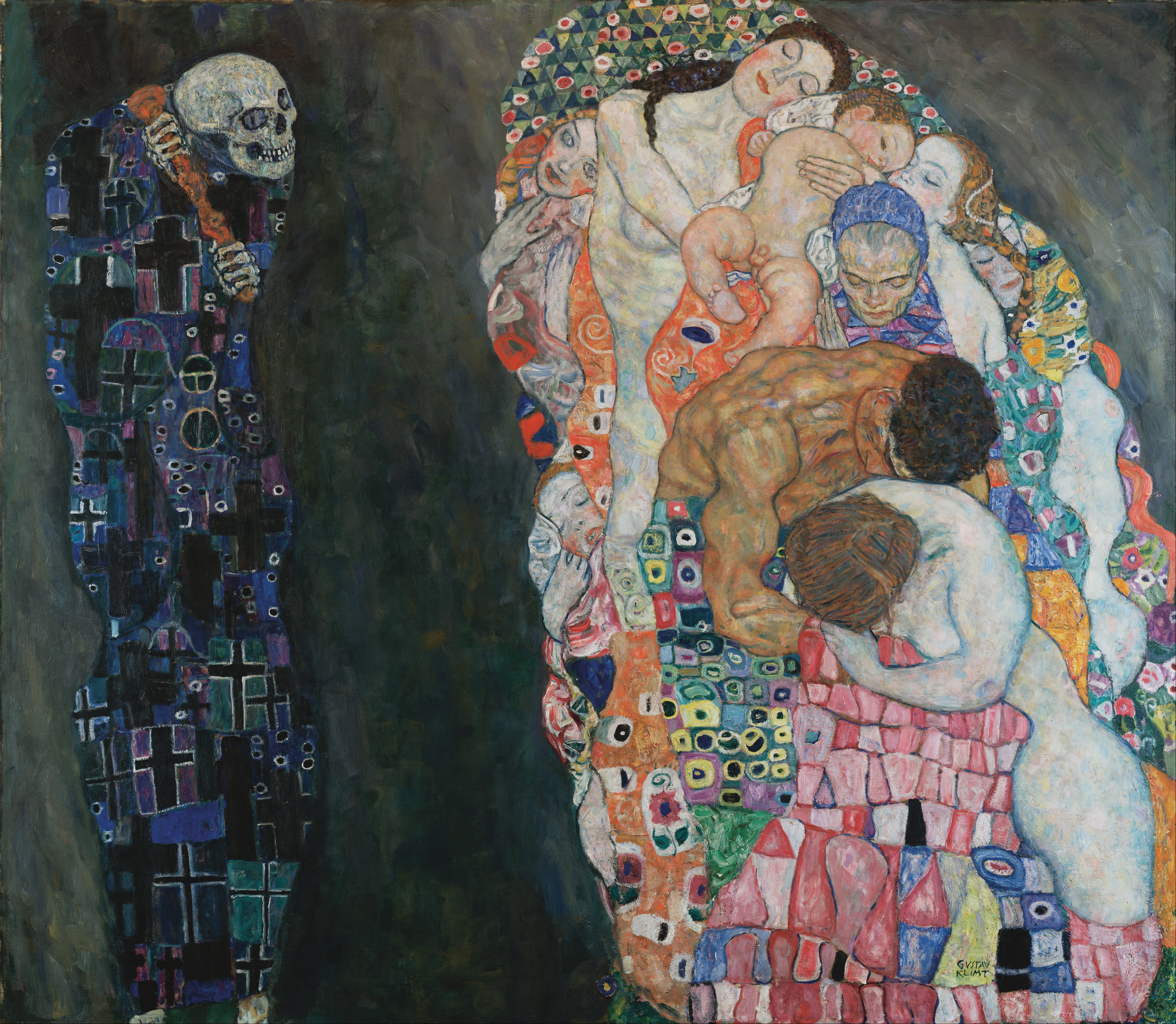
Gustav Klimt
Death and Life

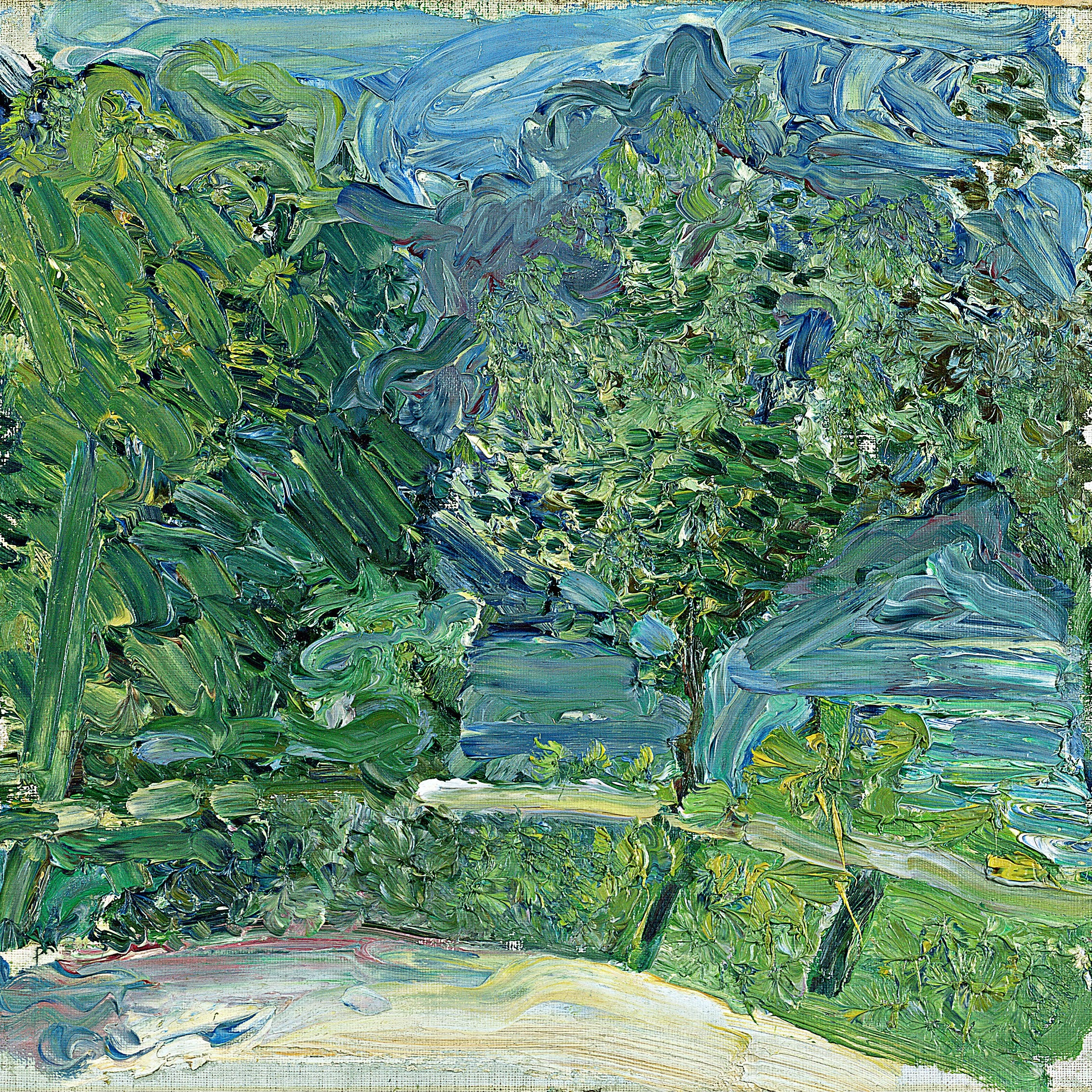
Richard Gerstl
Lakeside Road near Gmunden

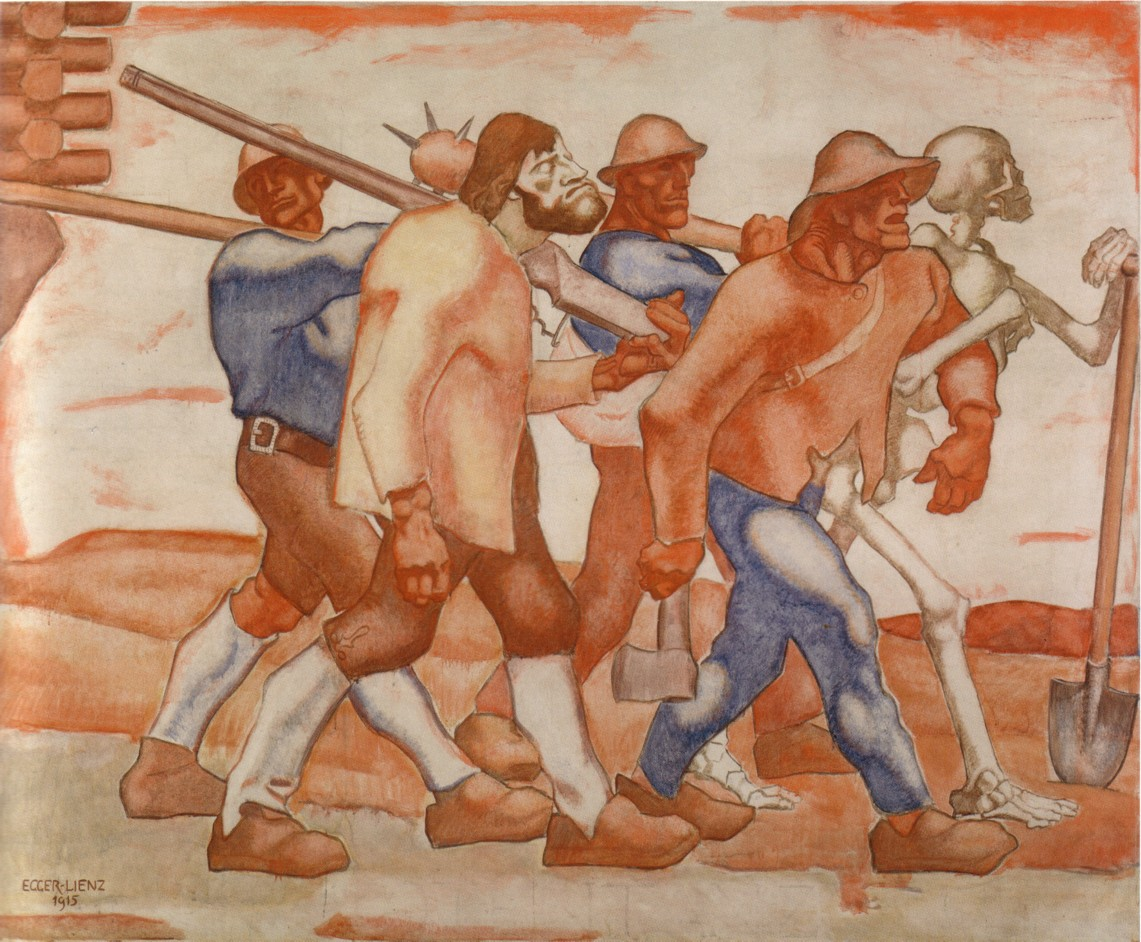
Albin Egger-Lienz
Totentanz
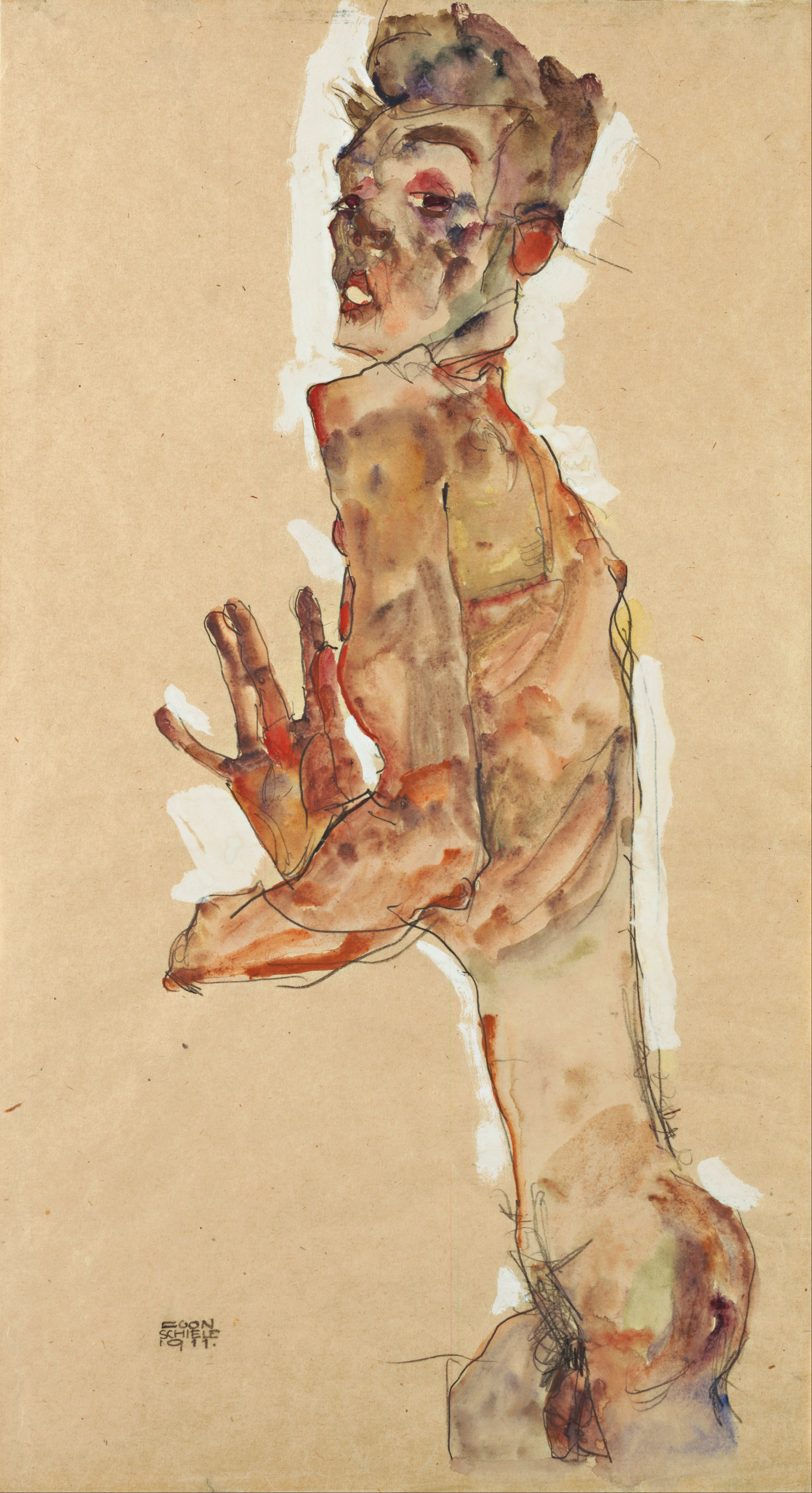
Egon Schiele
Self-Portrait with Splayed Fingers

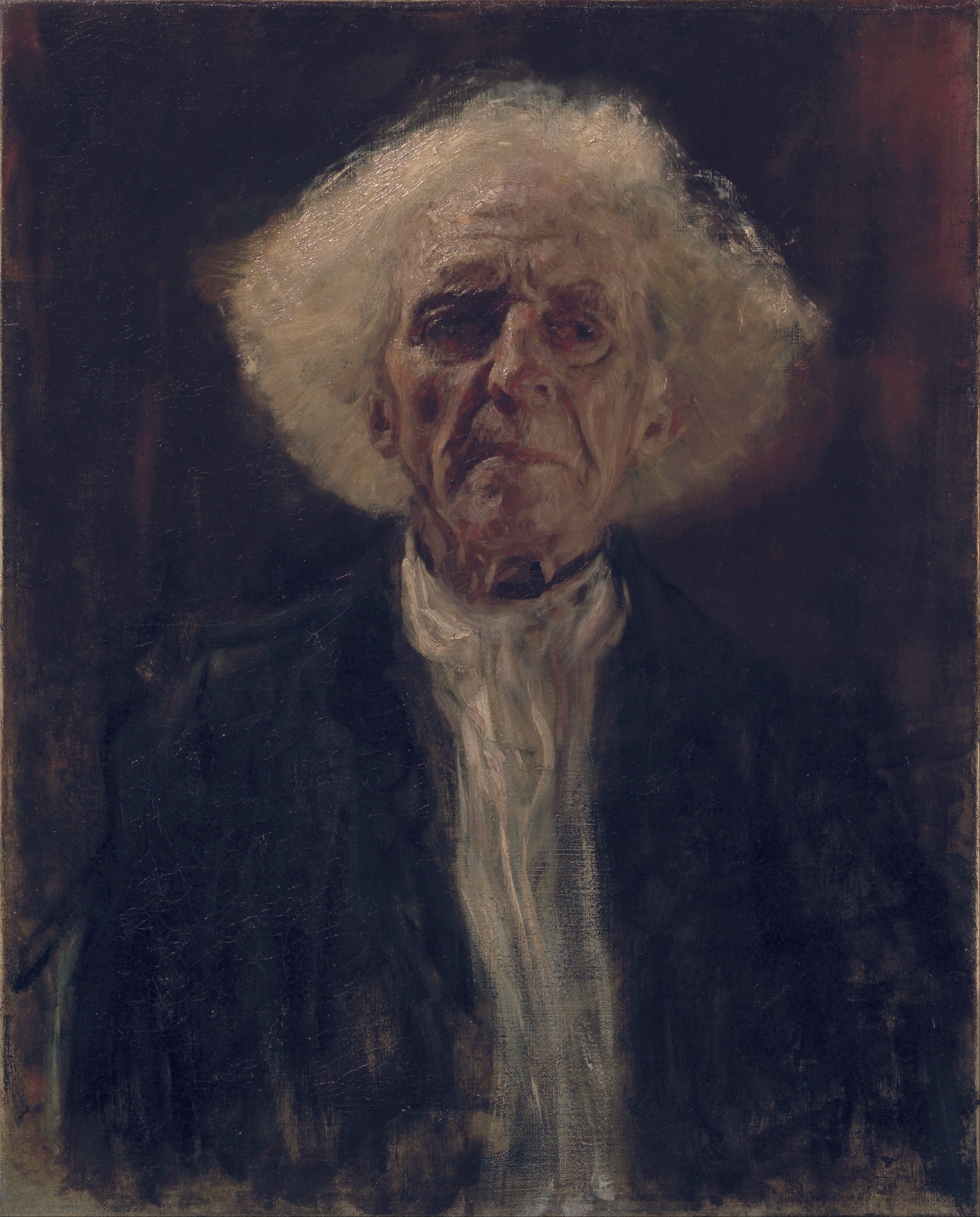
Gustav Klimt
Blind Man

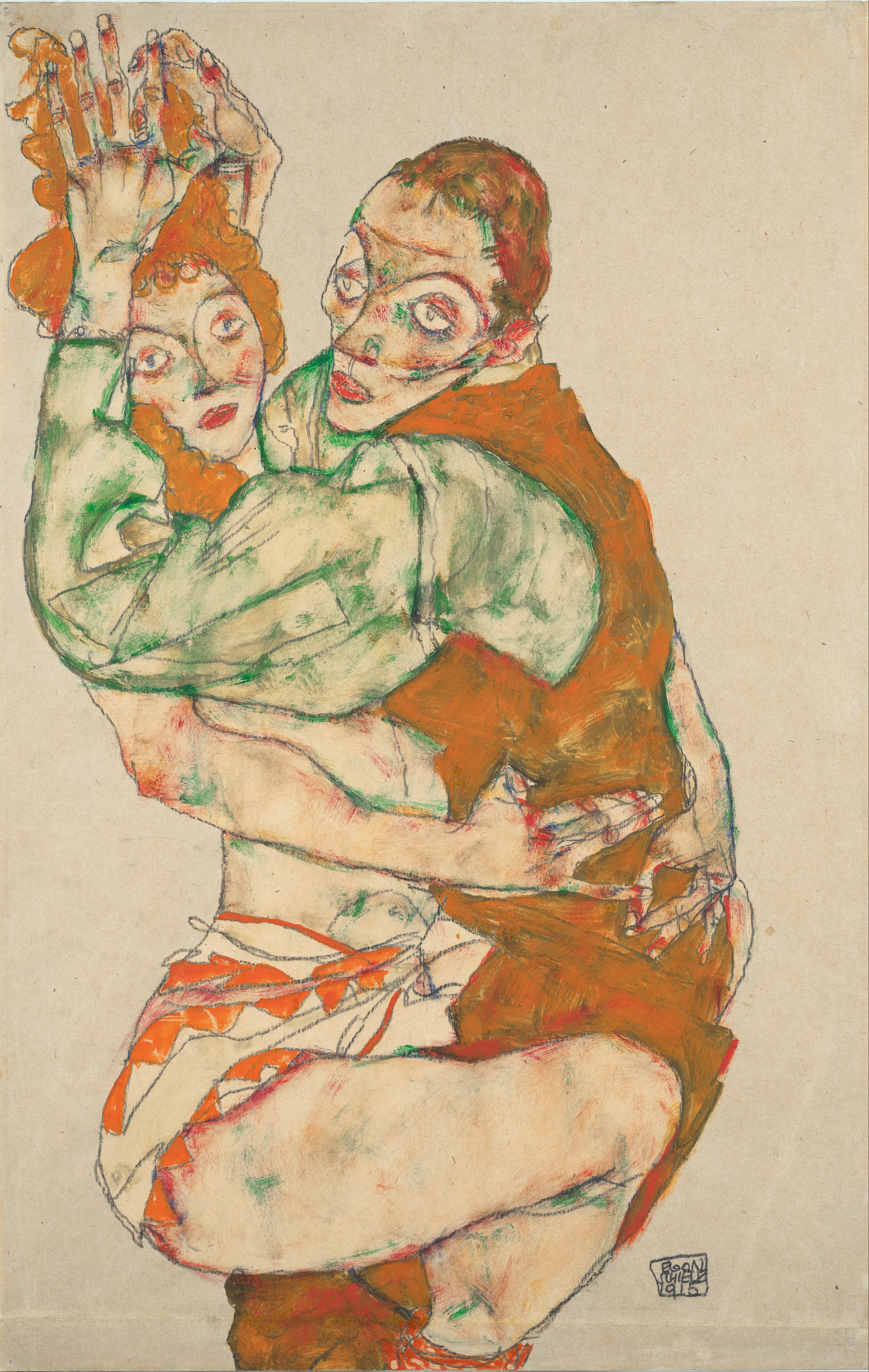
Egon Schiele
Lovemaking

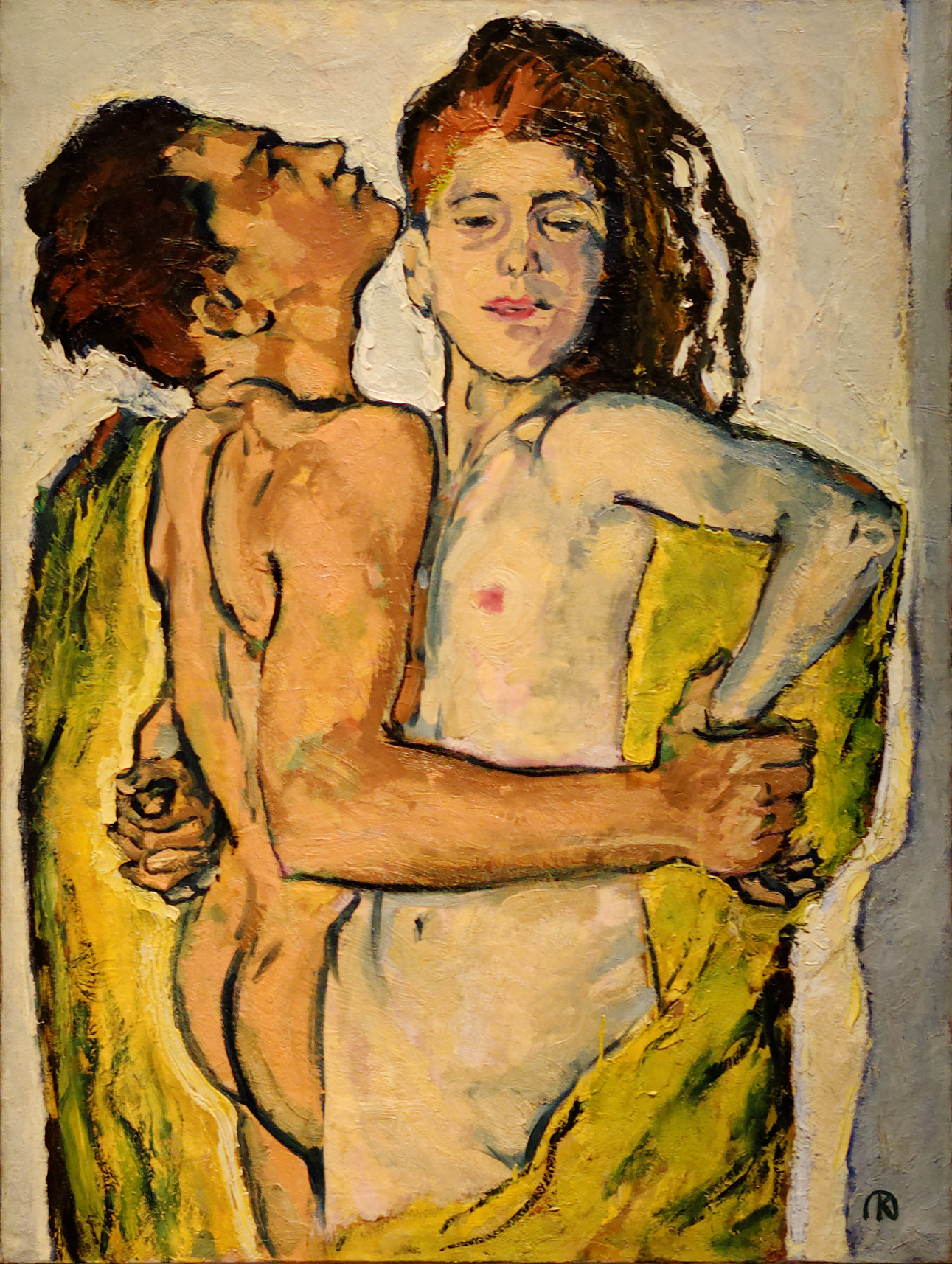
Koloman Moser
Lovers

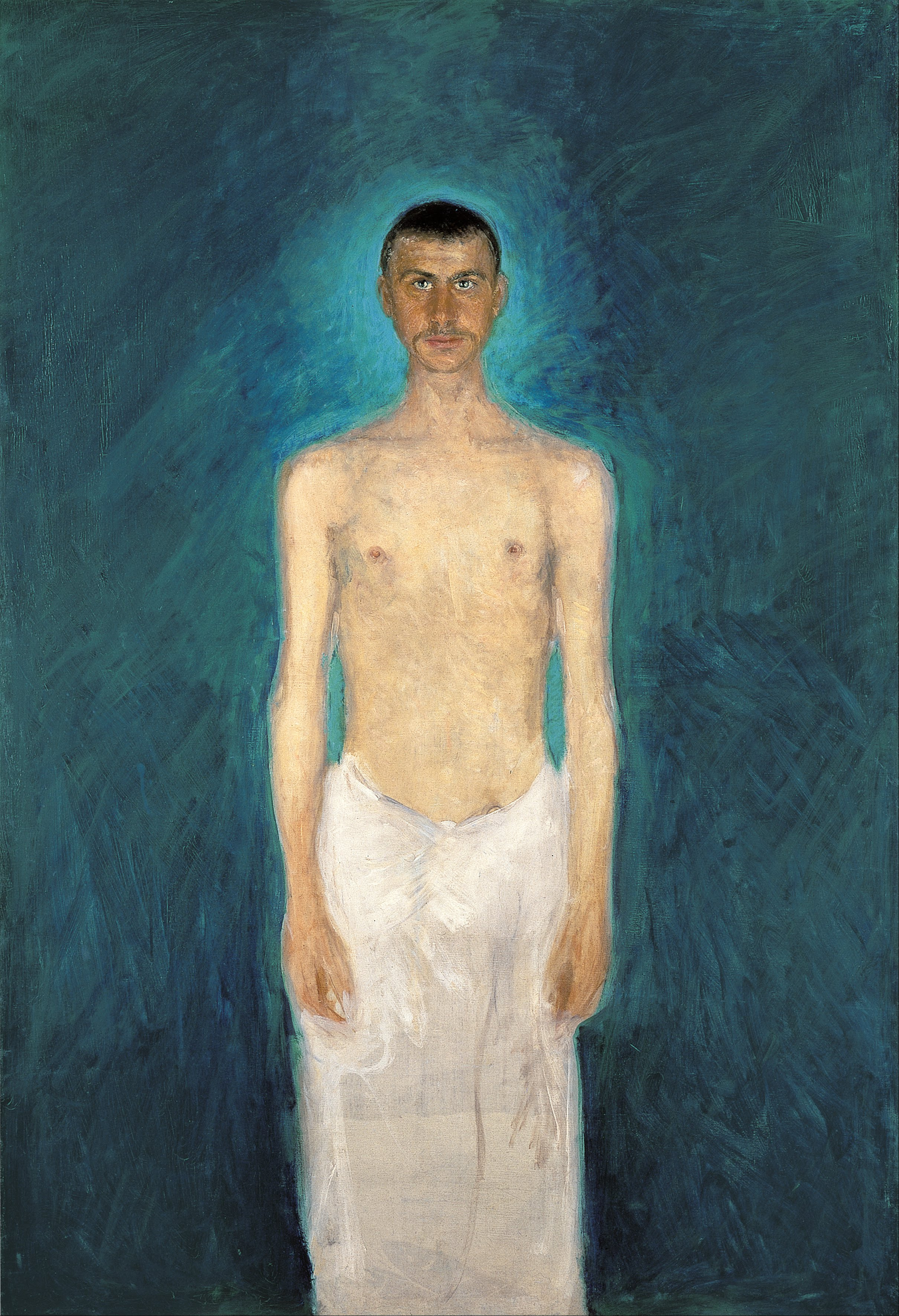
Richard Gerstl
Semi-Nude Self-Portrait

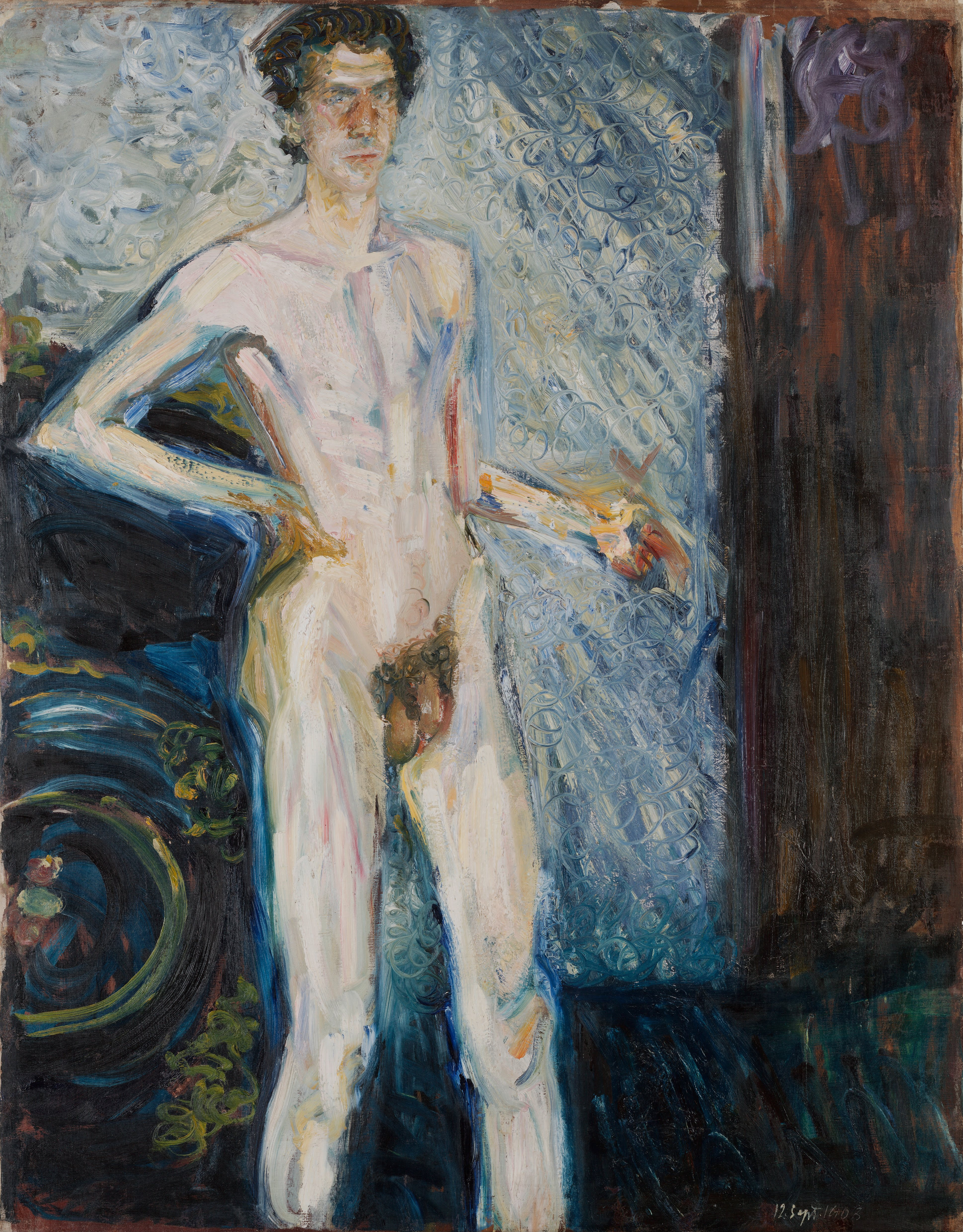
Richard Gerstl
Nude Self-Portrait with Palette

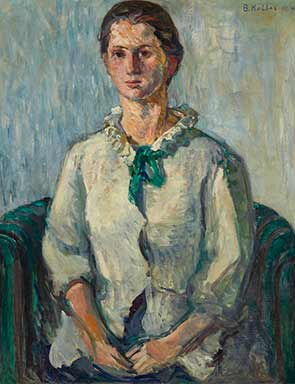
B. Koller-Pinell
Portrait of Silvia Koller

== See also ==
- Portrait of Wally Controversy
- List of claims for restitution for Nazi-looted art
- The Holocaust in Austria
