= Österreichische Galerie Belvedere =

Museum housed in the Belvedere Palace, in Vienna, Austria

Österreichische Galerie Belvedere (Austrian Gallery, Belvedere)
- Das Belvedere
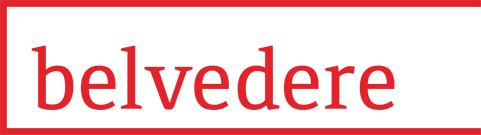

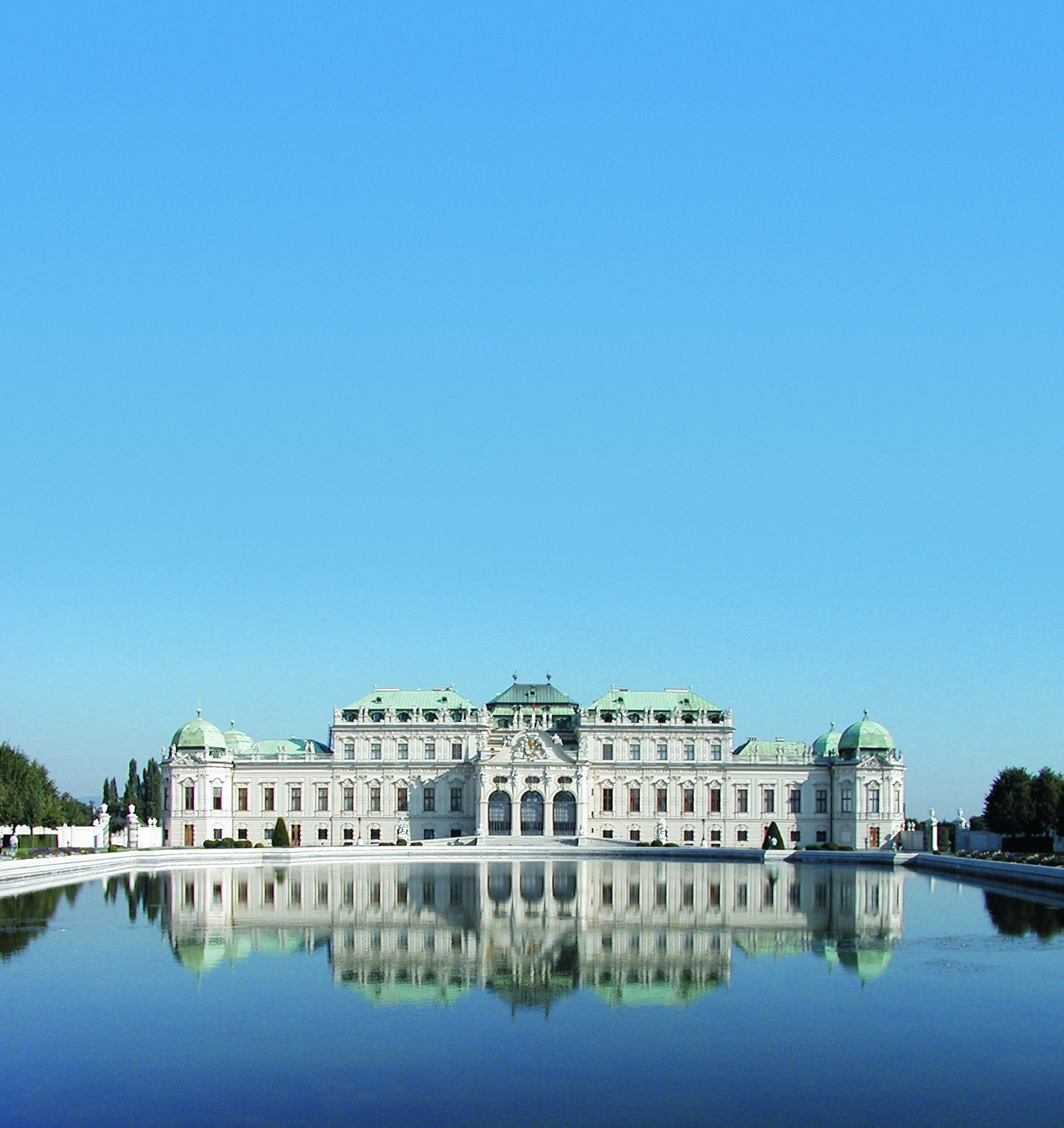
- Upper Belvedere
- Interactive fullscreen map
- Established: 1903
- Location: Prinz Eugen-Straße 27, Vienna, Austria
- Coordinates: 48°11′29″N 16°22′51″E
- Type: Art museum
- Visitors: 1,154,031 (2016)
- Director: Stella Rollig
- Website: www.belvedere.at/en

The Österreichische Galerie Belvedere is a museum housed in the Belvedere palace, in Vienna, Austria.

The Belvedere palaces were the summer residence of Prince Eugene of Savoy (1663–1736). The ensemble was built in the early eighteenth century by the famous Baroque architect Johann Lucas von Hildebrandt, and comprises the Upper and Lower Belvedere, with the Orangery and Palace Stables, as well as extensive gardens.

The Belvedere houses what was the first public museum in Austria, today containing significant collections of Austrian art dating from the Middle Ages to the present day, complemented by the works of international artists. At the Upper Belvedere, visitors not only encounter artworks drawn from over five hundred years of art history but can also experience the magnificent staterooms. In addition to the Lower and Upper Belvedere, the museum has further sites at Prince Eugene's town palace and the 21er Haus as well as the Gustinus Ambrosi Museum.

The Belvedere's art collection presents an almost complete overview of the development of art in Austria and, thus, an insight into the country's history. The world's largest collection of Gustav Klimt's paintings lies at the heart of the presentation of Art around 1900, on show at the Upper Belvedere. Its highlights are Klimt's paintings, The Kiss (1908) and Judith I (1901), and masterpieces by Egon Schiele and Oskar Kokoschka. Key works of French Impressionism and the greatest collection of Viennese Biedermeier art are further attractions at the museum.

== History ==
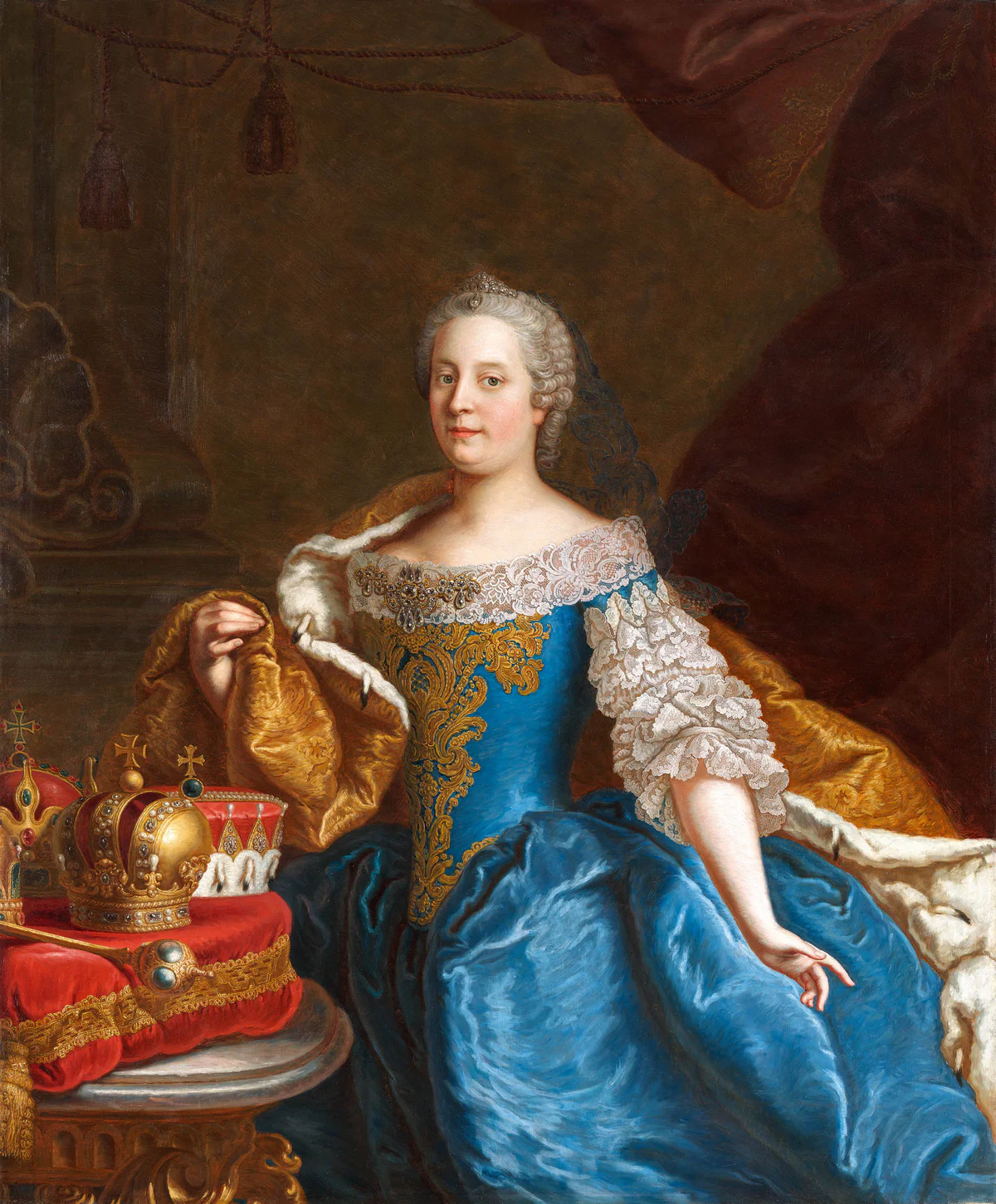
Portrait of Empress Maria Theresa and the Crowns of Austria-Hungary (1915) by Josef Pögl

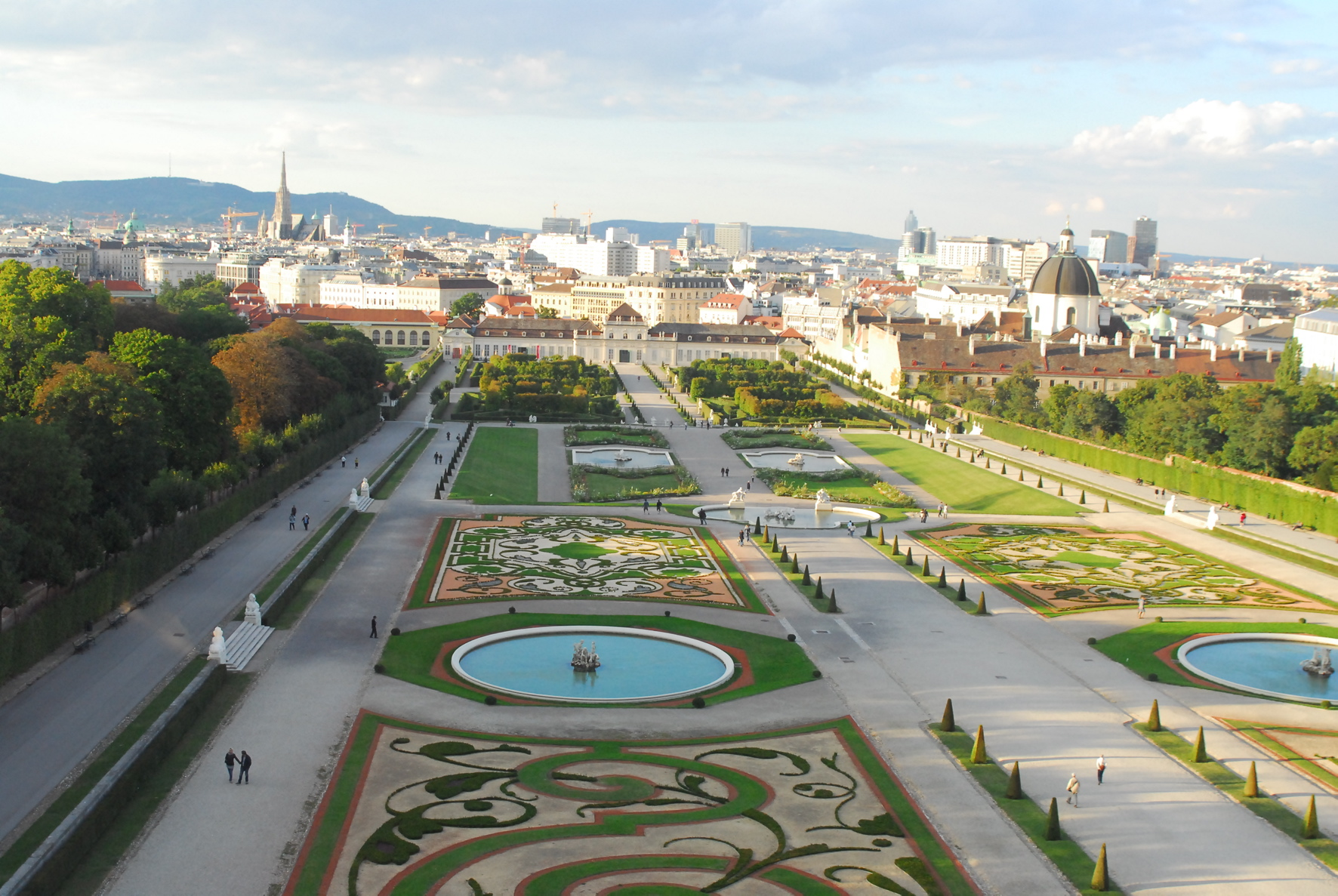
View over the park of the Belvedere

The Belvedere garden palace was commissioned by Prince Eugene of Savoy and completed in 1723. The architect Johann Lukas von Hildebrandt designed the Belvedere for summer residence. For the interior Prince Eugene commissioned Francesco Solimena, Carlo Carlone, and Giacomo del Pò. In 1776 Empress Maria Theresa transferred the Imperial Picture Gallery from the Imperial Hofburg Palace to Belvedere and granted the general public access. Various parts of the imperial art collection were subsequently placed on display at the Belvedere from 1781 onwards. In 1903, the state's "Moderne Galerie" was opened at the Lower Belvedere. After the fall of the Austro-Hungarian monarchy, the Upper Belvedere and the Orangery were converted into museums as well. The Österreichische Galerie (Austrian Gallery), as the museum was named in 1921, came to comprise the Baroque Museum in the Lower Belvedere which opened in 1923), the Gallery of 19th Century Art at the Upper Belvedere opened in 1924 and the Modern Gallery at the Orangery opened in 1929.

After the Anschluss with Nazi Germany in 1938, Nazi party member Bruno Grimschitz became director of the Belvedere from 1939 to 1945.. Grimschitz actively participated in the laundering of collections looted from Jewish collectors.

The Belvedere's collection of medieval art was first exhibited at the Orangery next to the Lower Belvedere in 1953.

In March of 1950, a major fire broke out in the “Gold Cabinet” in the north-eastern corner pavilion of the Upper Belvedere, which had already been damaged by bombing during World War II Some of the rooms and artworks destroyed in that fire were depicted by artists who had painted and/or photographed the interior and its decor earlier in the 20th century, such as the painter Josef Pögl (1867–1956) whose work is currently displayed as part of the Imperial Treasury Collection.

In 1955, after years of rebuilding and renovation, the Upper Belvedere was reopened to the public, showing works by Gustav Klimt, Egon Schiele, Oskar Kokoschka, and other major Austrian artists. In the years after the Second World War, there were many acquisitions and the museum was expanded and modernized. The Österreichische Galerie Belvedere is today one of the Austrian Federal Museums (Bundesmuseen) and since 2000 has been a legally independent public research/scientific institution (vollrechtsfähige "wissenschaftliche Anstalt).

Agnes Husslein, formerly director of the Salzburg Rupertinum and the Museum der Moderne on the Mönchsberg, was director of the Belvedere between 2007 and 2016. She helped to position the Belvedere as a museum of Austrian art in an international context. Stella Rollig who served as Austrian Federal Curator for the Fine Arts from 1994 to 1996, is currently the general director of the Belvedere since 2017. She and Christian Humer edited a book translated into English from the original German, celebrating 300 years of the museum and its collection in 2023.

Following extensive adaptation and remodelling, the highlights of the collections of medieval and Baroque art (previously in the Lower Belvedere) have been placed on display at the Upper Belvedere since spring 2008. For the first time, the entire scope of the permanent collection, from the Middle Ages to the mid-twentieth century, is possible to see under one roof. The adapted rooms in the Lower Belvedere and Orangery now provide space for temporary exhibitions.

== Gallery ==
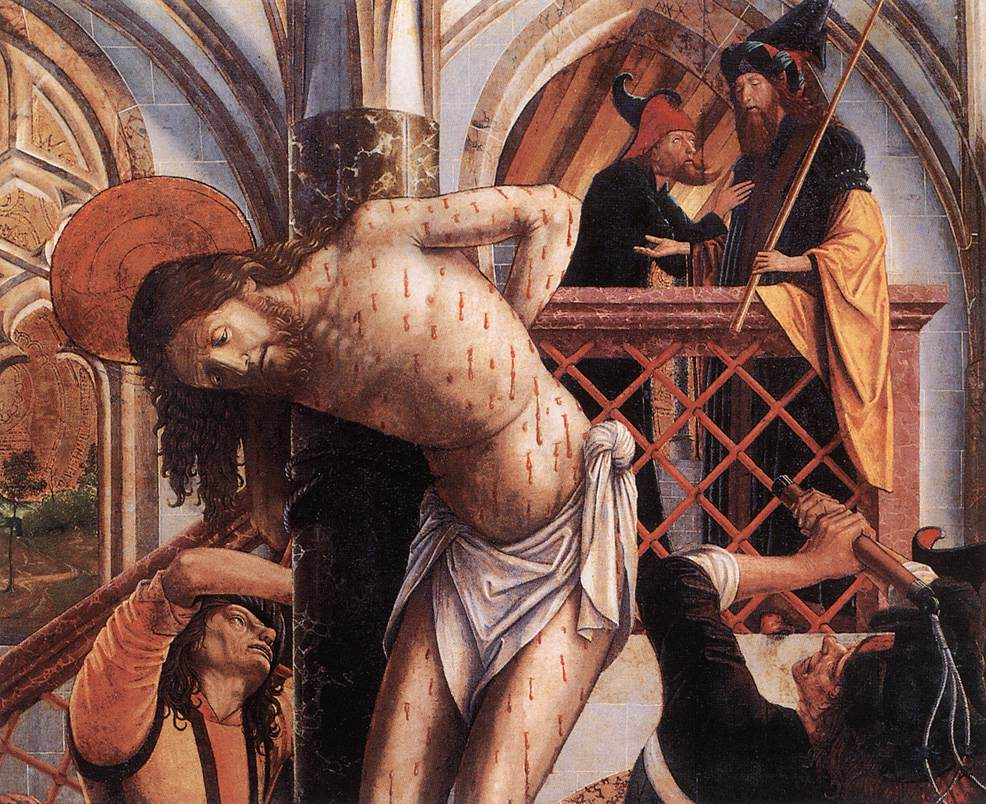
Michael Pacher, Flagellation, 1497/1498

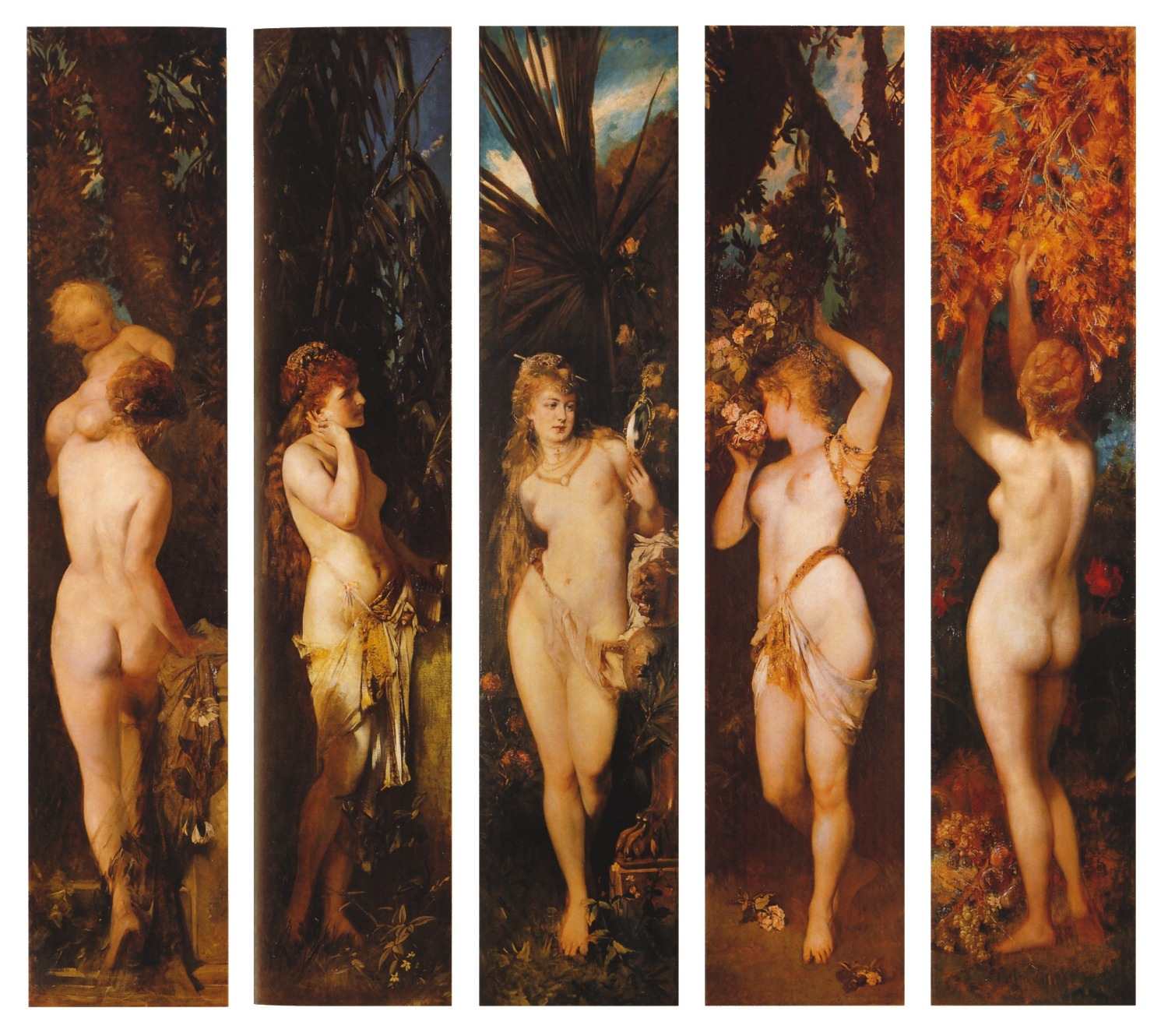
Hans Makart, The Five Senses, 1872/1879

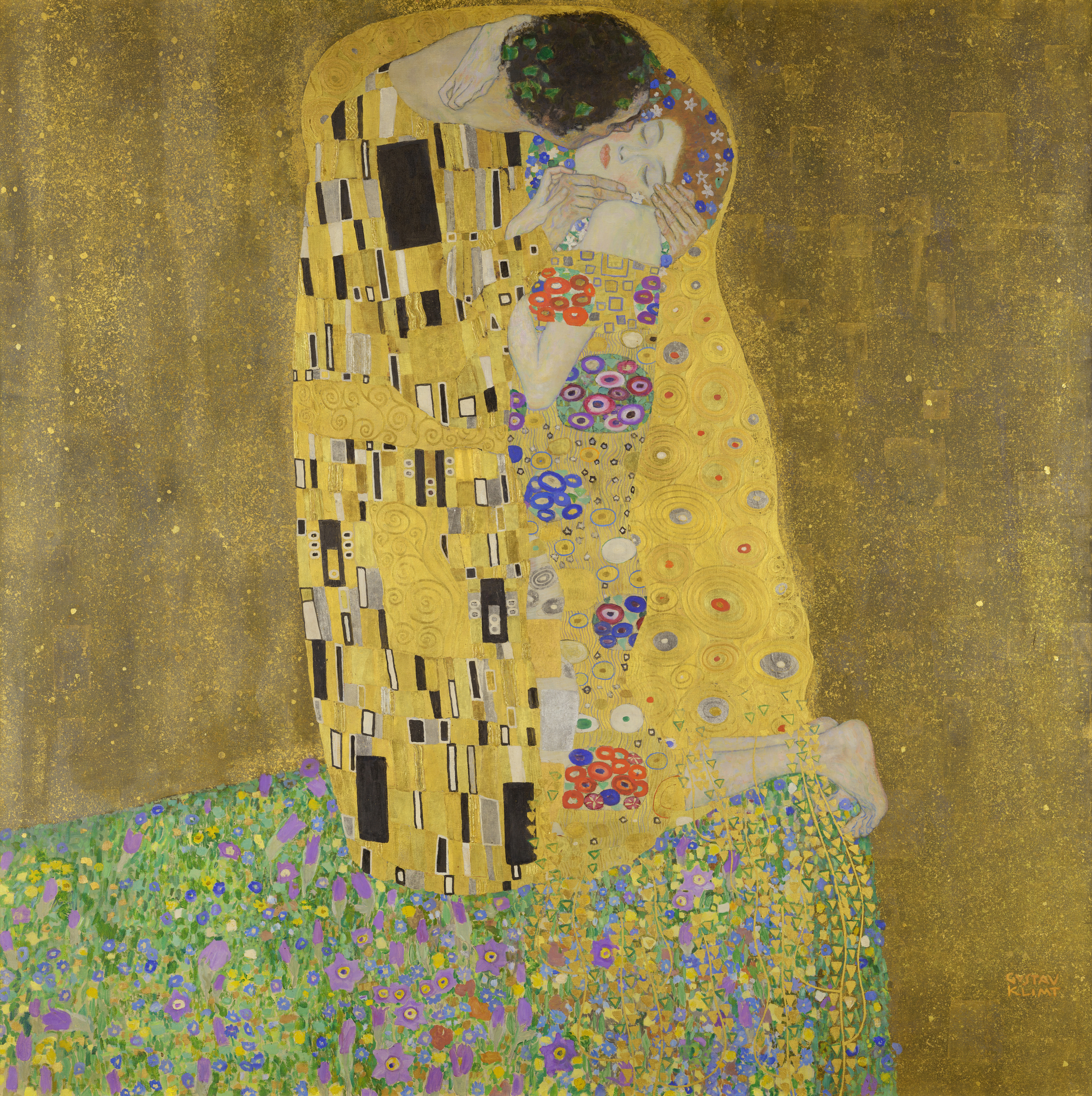
Gustav Klimt, The Kiss (Lovers), 1908

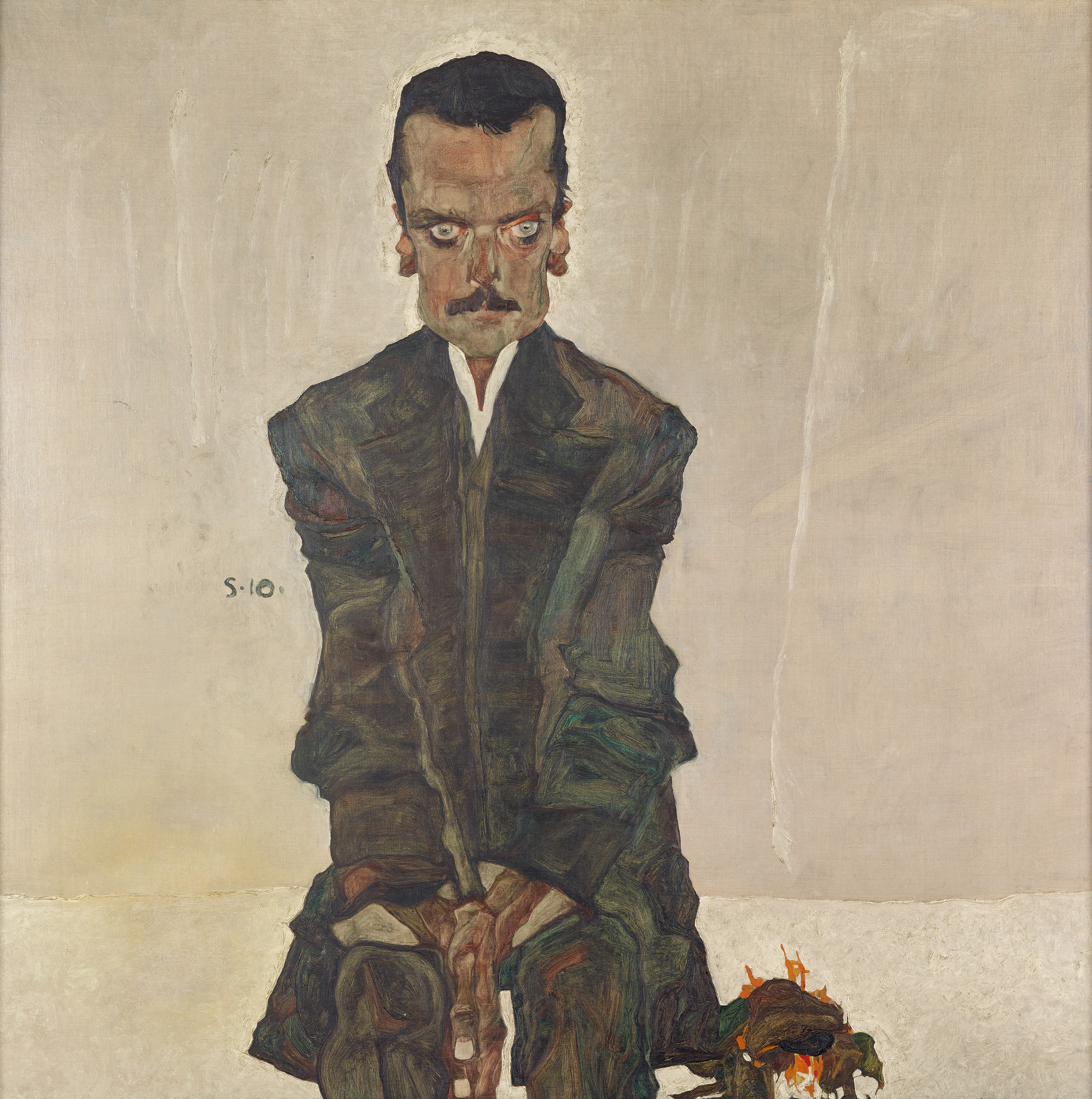
Egon Schiele, Portrait of Eduard Kosmack, 1910

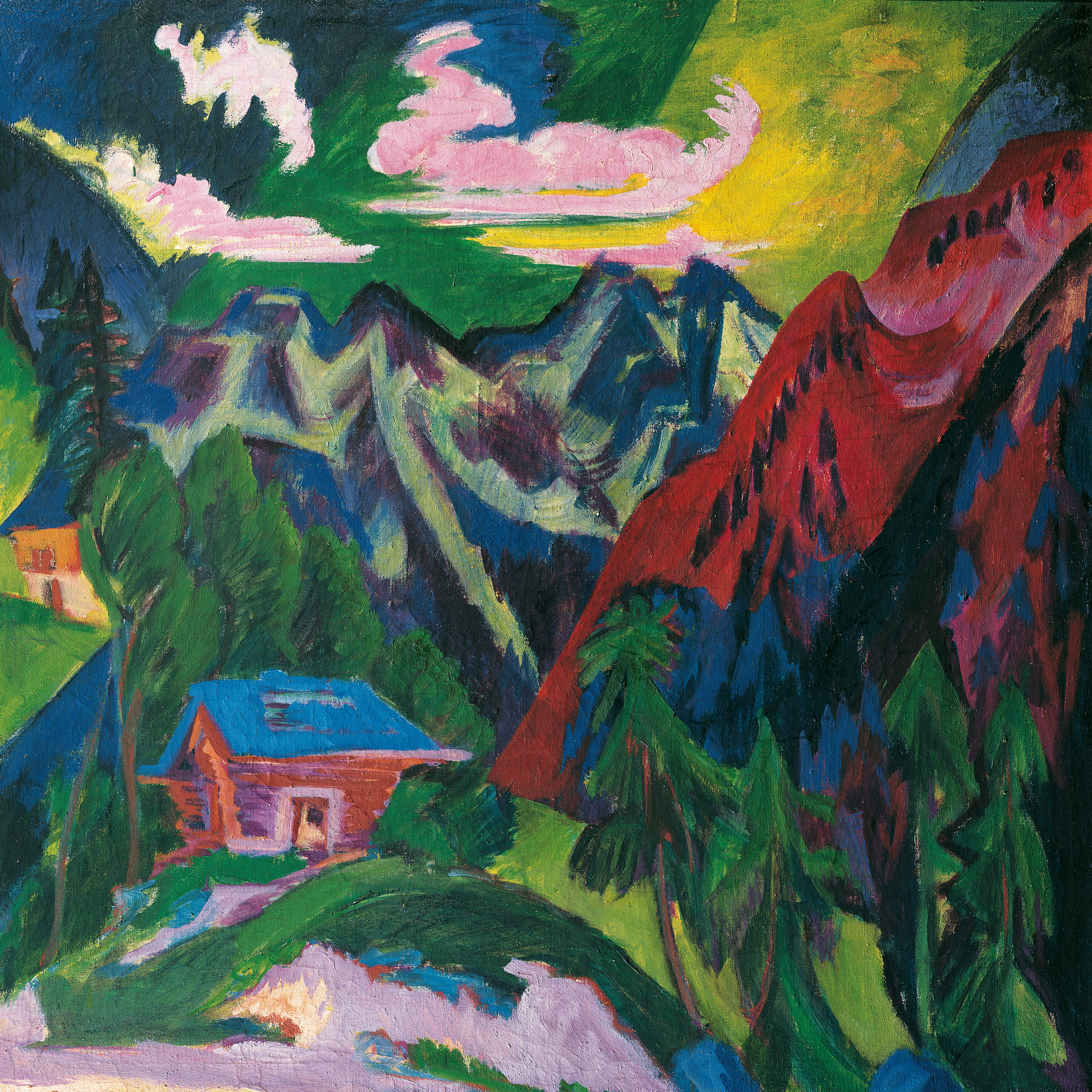
Ernst Ludwig Kirchner, Die Klosterser Berge, 1923
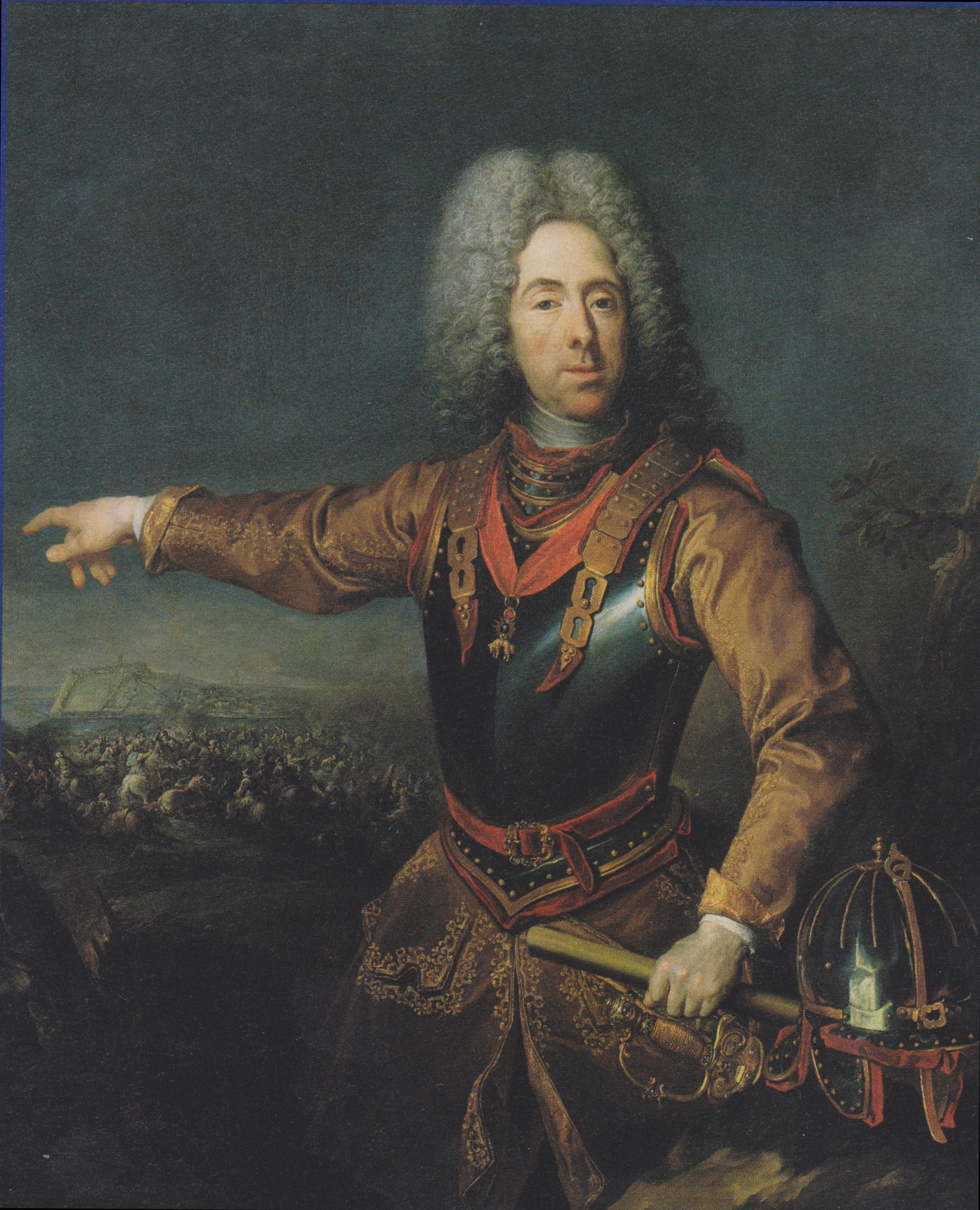
Jacob van Schuppen, Eugene (1663–1736), Prince of Savoy, 1718

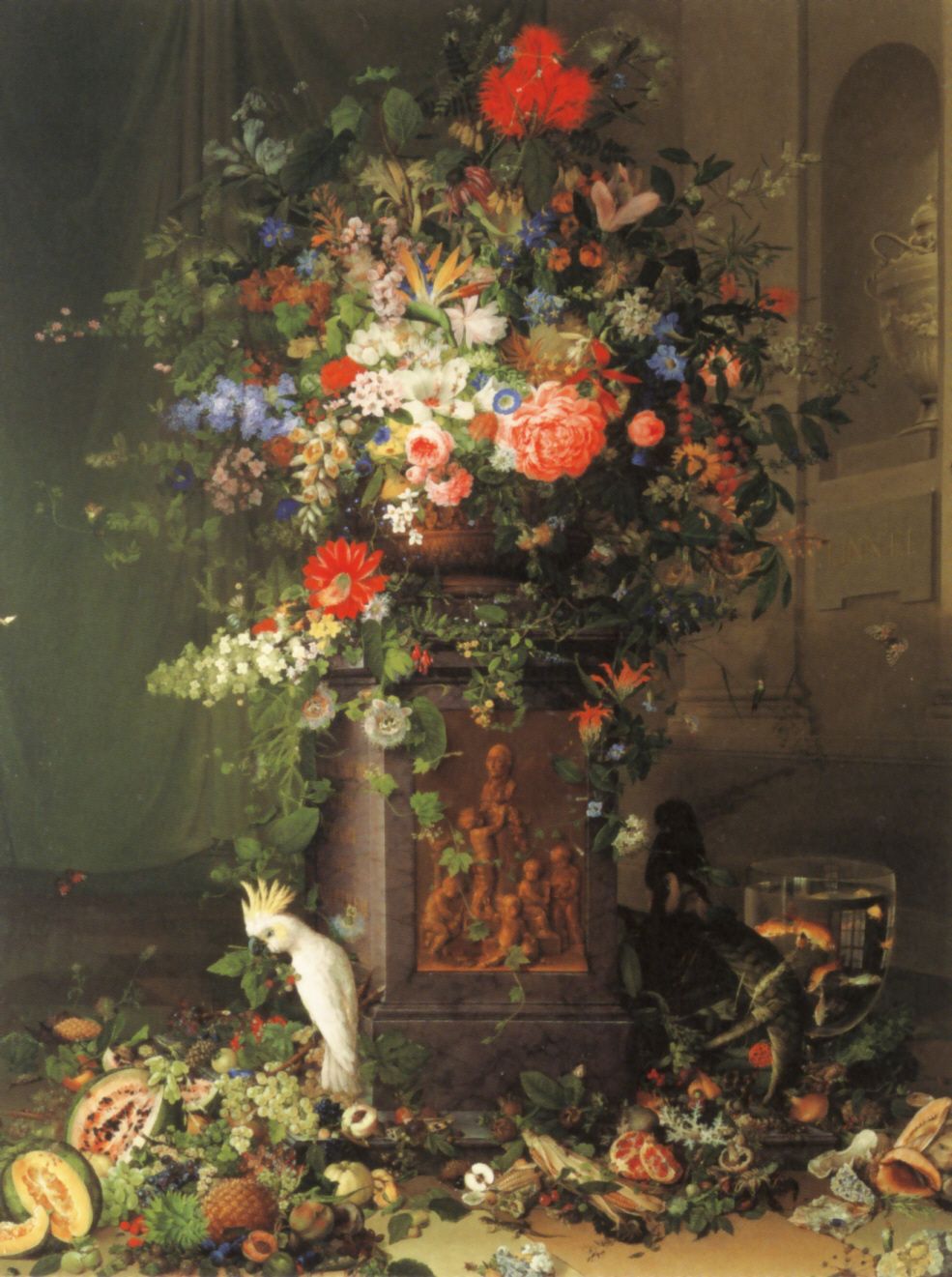
Johann Knapp, Huldigung an Jacquin (Homage to Jacquin), 1821–1822

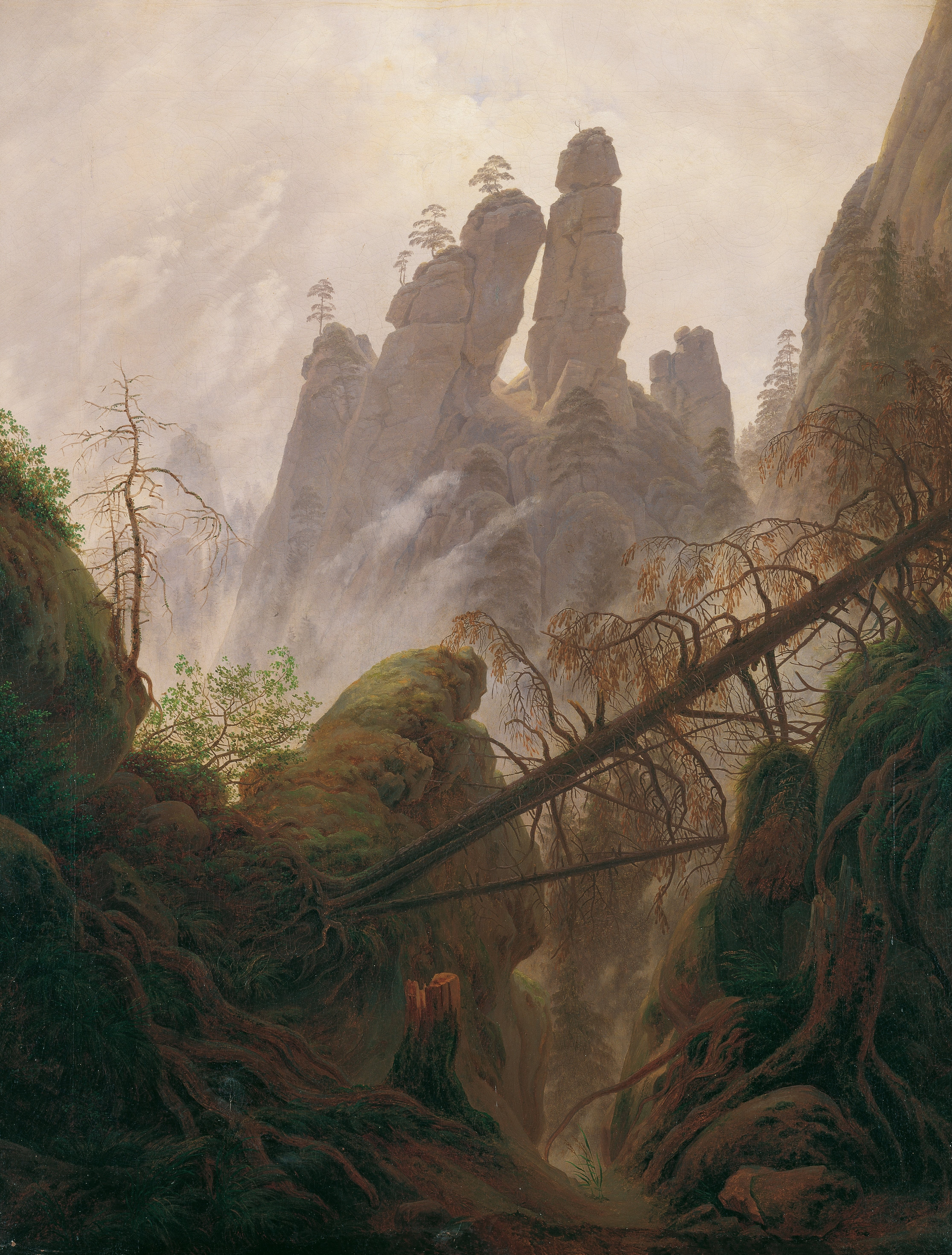
Caspar David Friedrich, Rocky Landscape in the Elbsandsteingebirge, 1822/1823

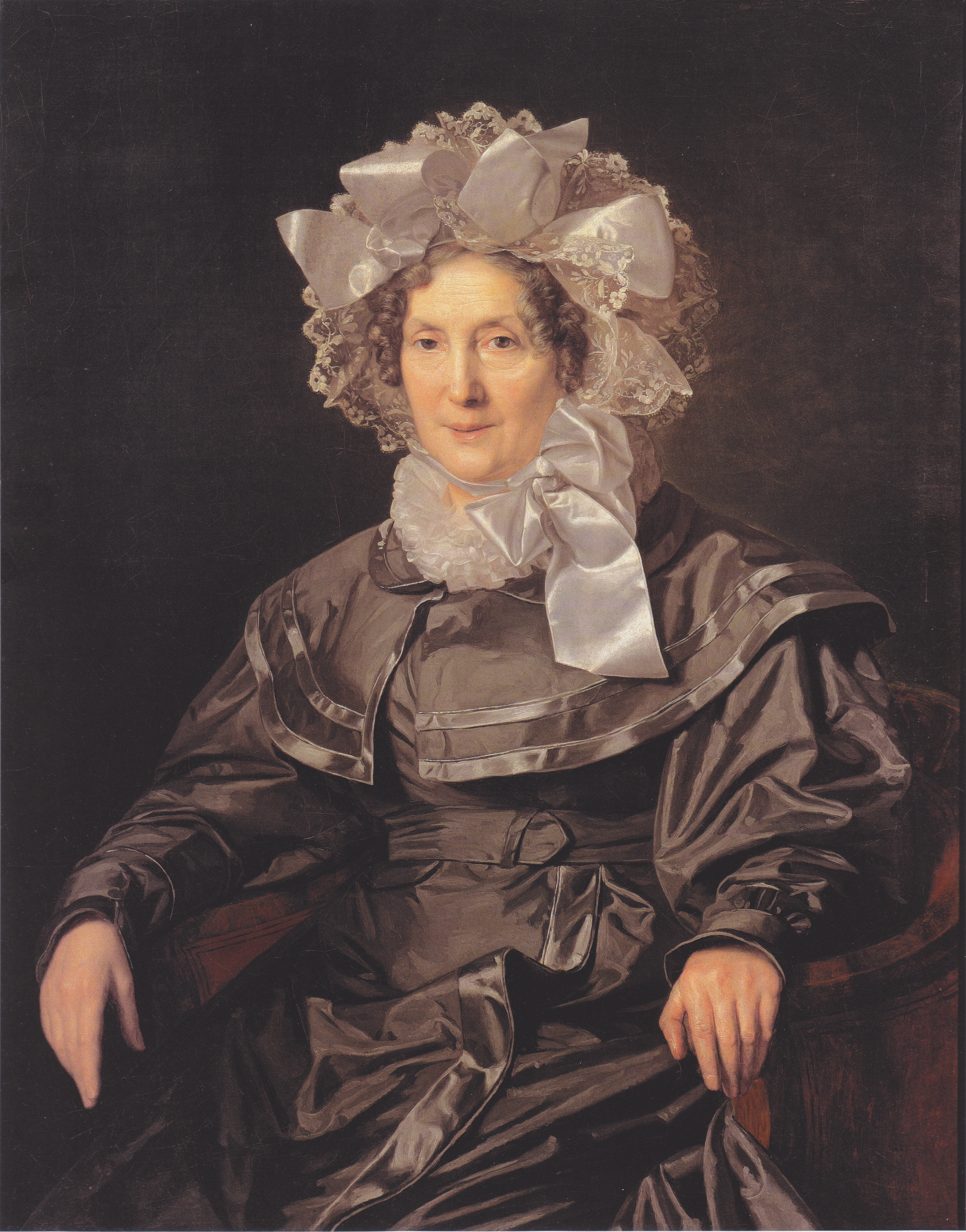
Ferdinand Georg Waldmüller, Elisabeth Waldmüller, die Mutter des Künstlers, 1830

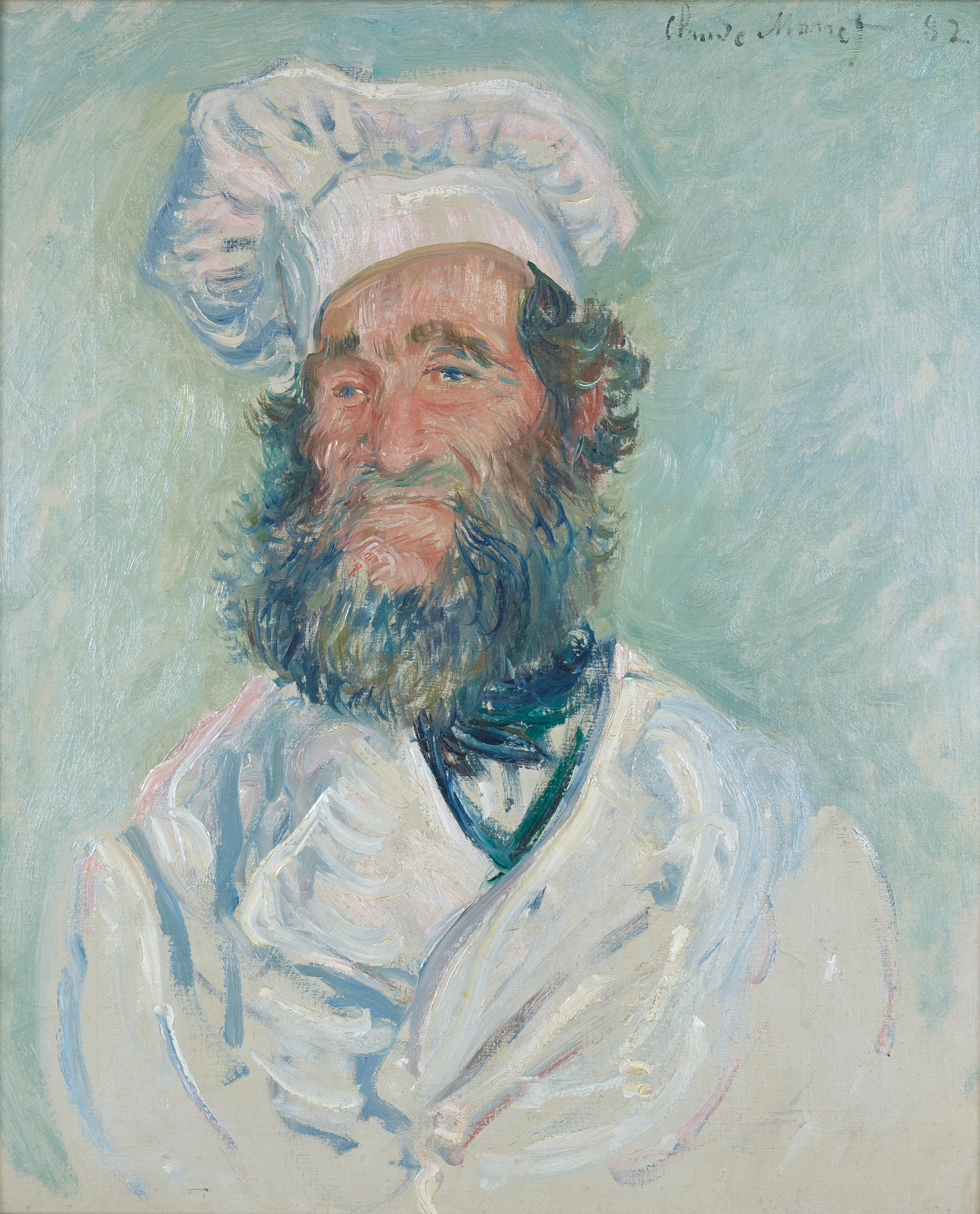
Claude Monet, Portrait of Père Paul, 1882

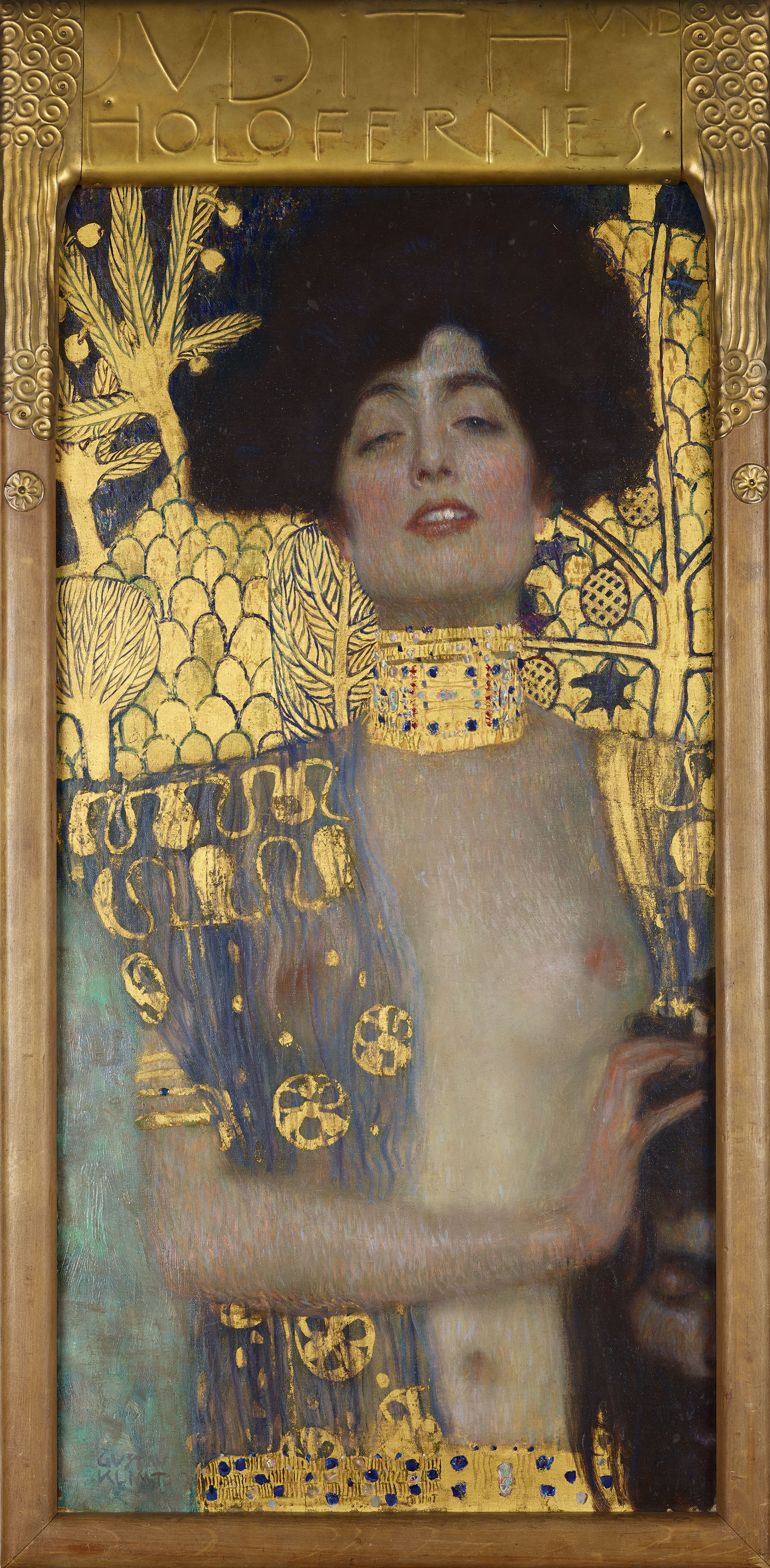
Gustav Klimt, Judith I, 1901

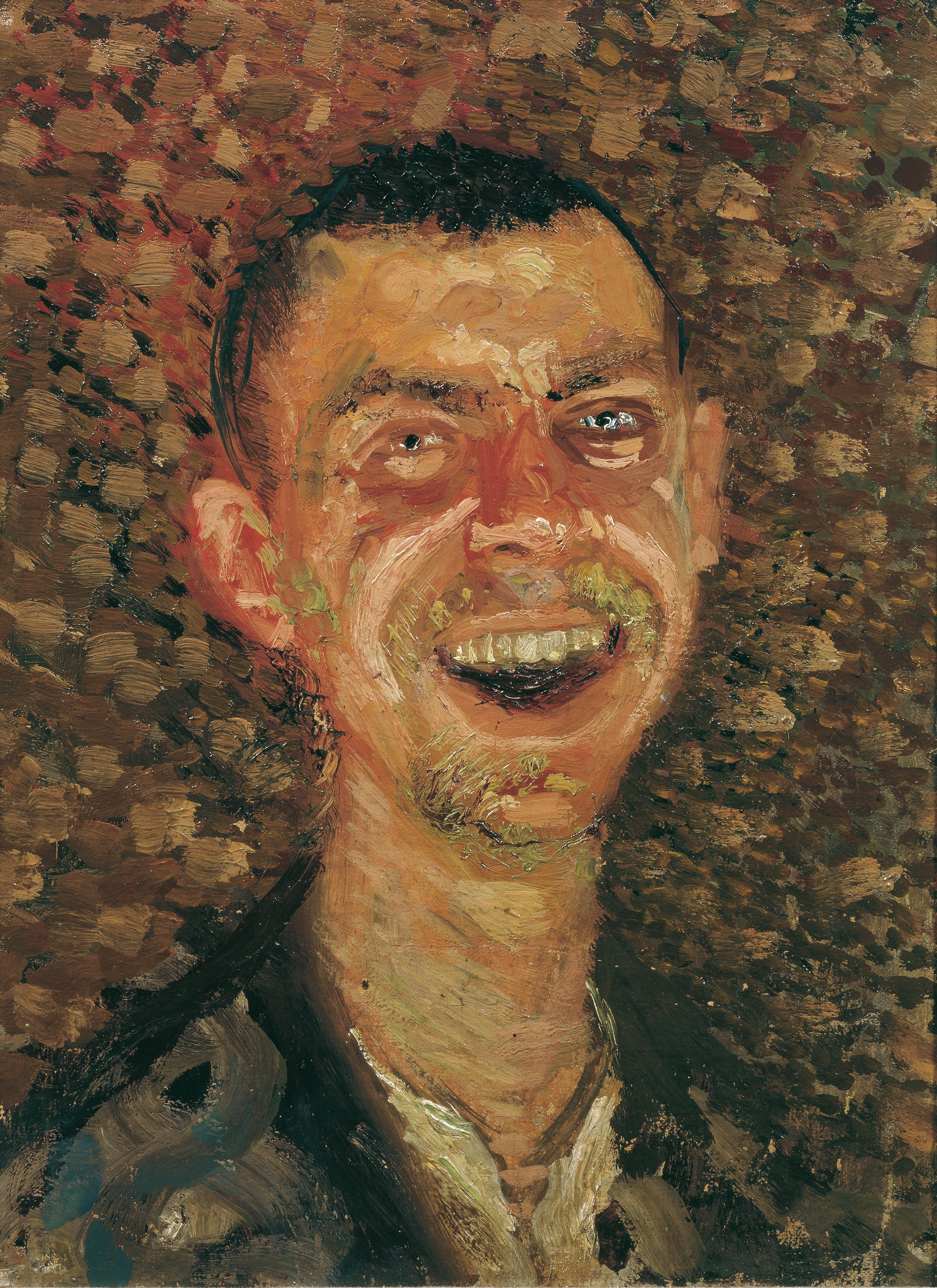
Richard Gerstl, Self-portrait, 1908

== Nazi-looted art controversies and restitutions ==
- On 26 August 1959, Holocaust survivor Alice Morgenstern, the widow of Josef Morgenstern who was murdered in Auschwitz, filed a claim to the Finanzlandesdirektion für Wien, Niederösterreich und das Burgenland (Provincial Tax Office for Vienna, Lower Austria and Burgenland) in which she stated, "the picture Four Trees by Egon Schiele, which used to be owned by us, is now hanging in the Upper Belvedere. We never sold the picture but gave it to a friend, Robert Röhrl, lawyer in Vienna, Gumpendorferstrasse, for safekeeping. He unfortunately died, and I do not know how the picture landed in the nineteenth-century [recte twentieth-century] collection in the Belvedere." On 20 March 2020, the Austrian Advisory Commission recommended that the Schiele be restituted to Morgenstern's heirs.
- In November 2006, after more than five decades of legal disputes, a panel ruled that Edvard Munch's "Summer Night at the Beach", on display at the Belvedere Gallery, was to be returned to Marina Fistoulari-Mahler, granddaughter and sole heir of Alma Mahler, wife of Austrian composer Gustav Mahler.
- In 2006 Austria returned five paintings by Gustav Klimt from the Belvedere, to Maria Altmann the heir of Adele Bloch-Bauer.
- In 2006 the Austrian arbitration panel decided that the portrait of "Amalie Zuckerkandl" by Gustav Klimt was not looted by the Nazis and did not need to be restituted. The decision caused much commentary, in part because Amalie Zuckerkandl perished with her daughter in Auschwitz and in part because, as MSNBC reported "Rather than return this obviously looted painting, an Austrian arbitration panel concluded that it should stay in the Belvedere."
- In 2009, the Austrian arbitration panel recommended that the Belvedere restitute Johann Peter Krafft, "Male Portrait" (also: "Portrait of his Brother" or "Portrait") to the legal successors of Max Mandl-Maldenau.
- In 2012 a documentary Portrait of Wally told how Egon Schiele's famous portrait ("Portrait of Wally"), which had belonged to a Viennese art dealer named Lea Bondi until the Nazi Friedrich Welz confiscated it from her private collection in 1939, was restituted by mistake to the Belvedere Museum after World War II as part of another dealer's collection.
- In 2014 the Belvedere was ordered to restitute "Farmer's Kitchen / Kitchen Interior" by Wilhelm Leibl to the heirs of Martha Liebermann – Max Liebermann's widow due to Nazi persecution.
