= Austria–Germany relations =

- Austria: Germany

Diplomatic mission
- Embassy of Austria, Berlin: Embassy of Germany, Vienna

Relations between Austria and Germany are close due to their shared history, with German being the official language and Germans being the ethnic group of both nations, and bordering each other.

Among the ancestors of Austrians were the Germanic Baiuvarii (ancient Bavarians).

In early history the Baiuvarii established the Duchy of Bavaria ruled by Francia of West Germanic Franks from 555 to 843 and including the March of Pannonia that would become Austria in c. 970. Later, the Bavarian Austria came under East Francia (Kingdom of Germany) from 843 to 962. It then separated from the Duchy of Bavaria to become a sovereign state in 1156, and from 1156 to 1806 Austria and other German-speaking states were part of the Holy Roman Empire, which was officially designated a German polity from 1512 and predominantly led by Austria itself. Austria was part of the German Confederation from 1815 to 1866 and led it.

From 1938 to 1945 under the Nazi regime, Austria was annexed into Germany in the Anschluss.

== History ==
The German Confederation was also led by Austria from 1815 to 1866. In 1866 Austria was firstly separated from Germany and German Confederation was dissolved. In 1867, the multi-ethnic Austro-Hungarian Empire was established and led by Austria; it was rivaled by the North German Confederation from 1866 to 1871 and German Empire led by the Kingdom of Prussia rivaled Austria. Militarily, Austria (Austria-Hungary) and Germany (German Empire) were allies of each other at the time.

In 1918, after the end of World War I and with the fall of Austro-Hungarian and German Empires, Austria briefly renamed itself the Republic of German-Austria in a bid for union with Germany; an action forbidden by the Treaty of Saint-Germain-en-Laye (1919) created by the winners of World War I against both Germany and Austria and as a result; throughout much of the Interwar period, Austria and Germany continued to remain as separate and distinct entities.

However, in 1938, Nazi Germany led by Austrian-born Adolf Hitler annexed Austria into Germany in what would come to be called the Anschluss. Following the fact that Austria under Allied control claimed independence to be secondly separated from Germany on 27 April 1945, the German identity in Austria has been weakened. The 1955 Austrian State Treaty to let Austria gain power from the Allied occupying the country also banned the reunification of Germany and Austria. The first victim theory was very popular in Austria from its start in 1949 to 1988 that Austria was the first victim of Nazi Germany and therefore had nothing to do with the Nazi German crimes, but this theory has been disproved by Austrians themselves since 1988. In 1990, West Germany and East Germany were reunited.

After Austria's entry into the European Union (EU) in 1995, both are member-states of the EU and have same currency and free border; however whereas Germany is a member nation of NATO from 1955, Austria in accordance with its strict constitutional requirement of neutrality is not a NATO member.

Since 2004, meetings of German-speaking countries have been held annually with six participants, including Germany and Austria. Both countries are full members of the Council of Europe and the European Union.

=== Holy Roman Empire ===
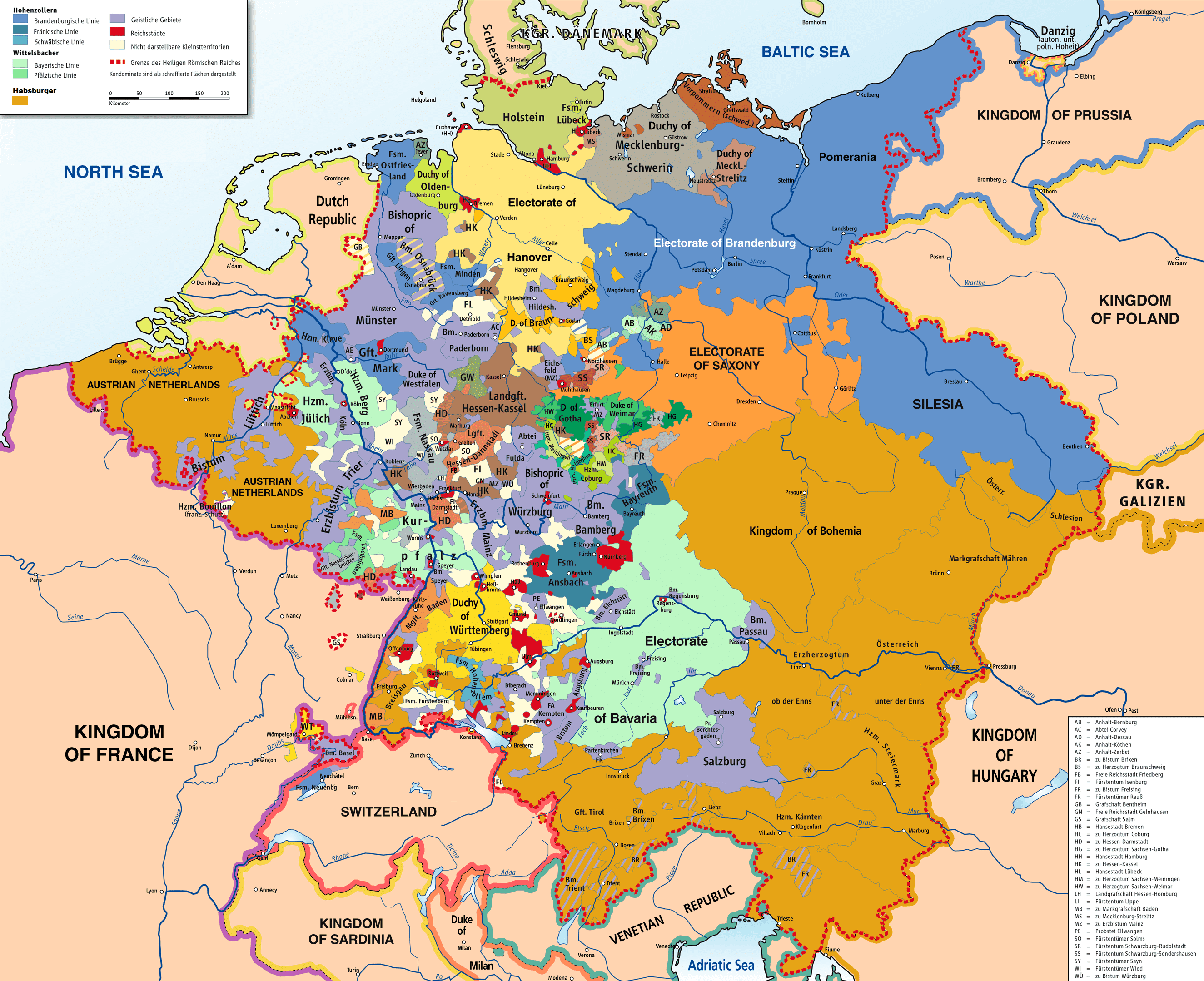
The Holy Roman Empire in 1789, showing Austrian territories (brown) and Prussian territories (blue)

At various times, throughout the Middle and Early-modern Ages, the Holy Roman Empire (HRE) encompassed the bulk of present territories of Germany, Austria, Bohemia (Czech Republic), Slovenia, northern Italy and western Poland. The House of Habsburg became the ruling family of the Empire in 1440; the family would remain so until the dissolution of the Empire in 1806.

Austria has been the Habsburg's seat of power and the dominant state within the realm. The numerous German states (within the HRE) constantly jostled for power and influence; they often warred against each other. In the 18th century, the Kingdom of Prussia rose as another influential power within the HRE; therefore, Prussia became Austria's main rival for dominance over their neighbouring German states. Prussia and Austria fought a series of wars over the province of Silesia (in modern-day southwestern Poland) between 1740 and 1763. Austria and Prussia co-operated in the Partitions of Poland and the Second Schleswig War, which resulted in annexations of Polish and Danish territory.

=== Napoleonic Wars and German Confederation ===
The Holy Roman Empire came to an end during the Napoleonic Wars in the 1790s and 1800s, Austria and Prussia allied with each other but fought unsuccessfully against the French Empire. In 1804, Francis II, the Holy Roman Emperor, proclaimed the Austrian Empire, as the remaining German States had become clients of Napoleon's French Empire under the Confederation of the Rhine.

After Napoleon's defeat in 1815, Austria created the German Confederation as a new organisation among the German States, in which Prussia and Austria became reunited. It was during this period that the ideology of Pan-Germanism started to rise. The German Confederation lacked a monarch or a central government with real unifying force. As a result, dualism within the German Confederation laid foundation to the diplomatic tension between Prussia and Austria, who had ambitions to create a unified Germany under their different proposals.

Austria proposed to unite the German states in a union centered on, and dominated by, the Habsburgs; Prussia, however, hoped to become the central forces in unifying the German states and to exclude Austria out of its affairs. In 1834, Prussia succeeded in creating a German Customs Union with northern German states with the hope of political union as its next step. The tension eventually gave rise to the 1866 Austro-Prussian War (Fraternal War of the Germans). Otto von Bismarck, chancellor of Prussia, sided with Italy to surround Austria and bring about the latter's defeat. The Austrian Empire was dissolved into the Dual Monarchy of Austria-Hungary, with the loss of their influence over southern German states (Baden-Württemberg and Bavaria).

=== German Empire without Austria ===
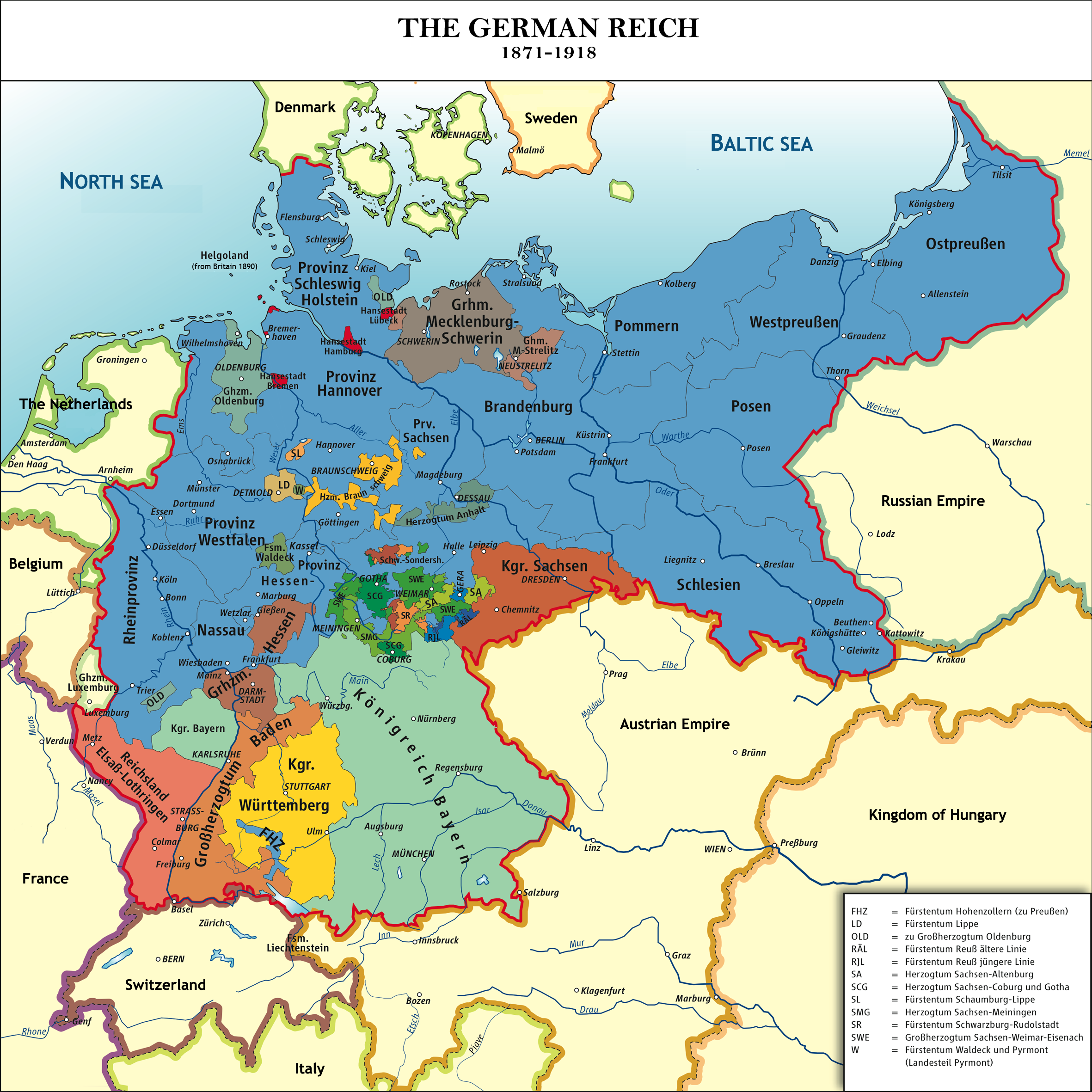
The German Empire without Austria

In 1867, the new North German Confederation was declared by Bismarck. After Prussia's victory in the Franco-Prussian War in 1870, in which Prussian army entered and marched over Paris, Bismarck announced the creation of the German Empire and excluded Austria-Hungary solely in this unified Germany. Austria-Hungary then turned its imperial ambitions to the Balkan Peninsula; whereas the German Empire focused on building armaments in a race against the United Kingdom (Britain and Ireland). Nevertheless, both the German Empire and Austria-Hungary forged a military alliance with the Kingdom of Italy, forming the Triple Alliance (1882). In the 1910s, Austria-Hungary's ambition of turning Serbia into its protectorate facilitated the Assassination of Archduke Franz Ferdinand (1914), heir to Austria-Hungary's throne. When Austria-Hungary stirred up excuses for a war (First World War) against Serbia, Germany, claiming the Alliance's terms of passive military defence instead of downright aggression, reluctantly entered the war on Austria-Hungary's side.

The 1914 Septemberprogramm authorized by German Chancellor Theobald von Bethmann Hollweg proposed the creation of a Central European Economic Union, comprising a number of European countries, including Germany and Austria-Hungary, in which, as the Chancellor secretly stressed, there was to be a semblance of equality among the member states, but in fact it was to be under German leadership to stabilize Germany's economic predominance in Central Europe, with co-author Kurt Riezler admitting that the union would be a veiled form of German domination in Europe (see also: Mitteleuropa).

=== Inter-war period ===
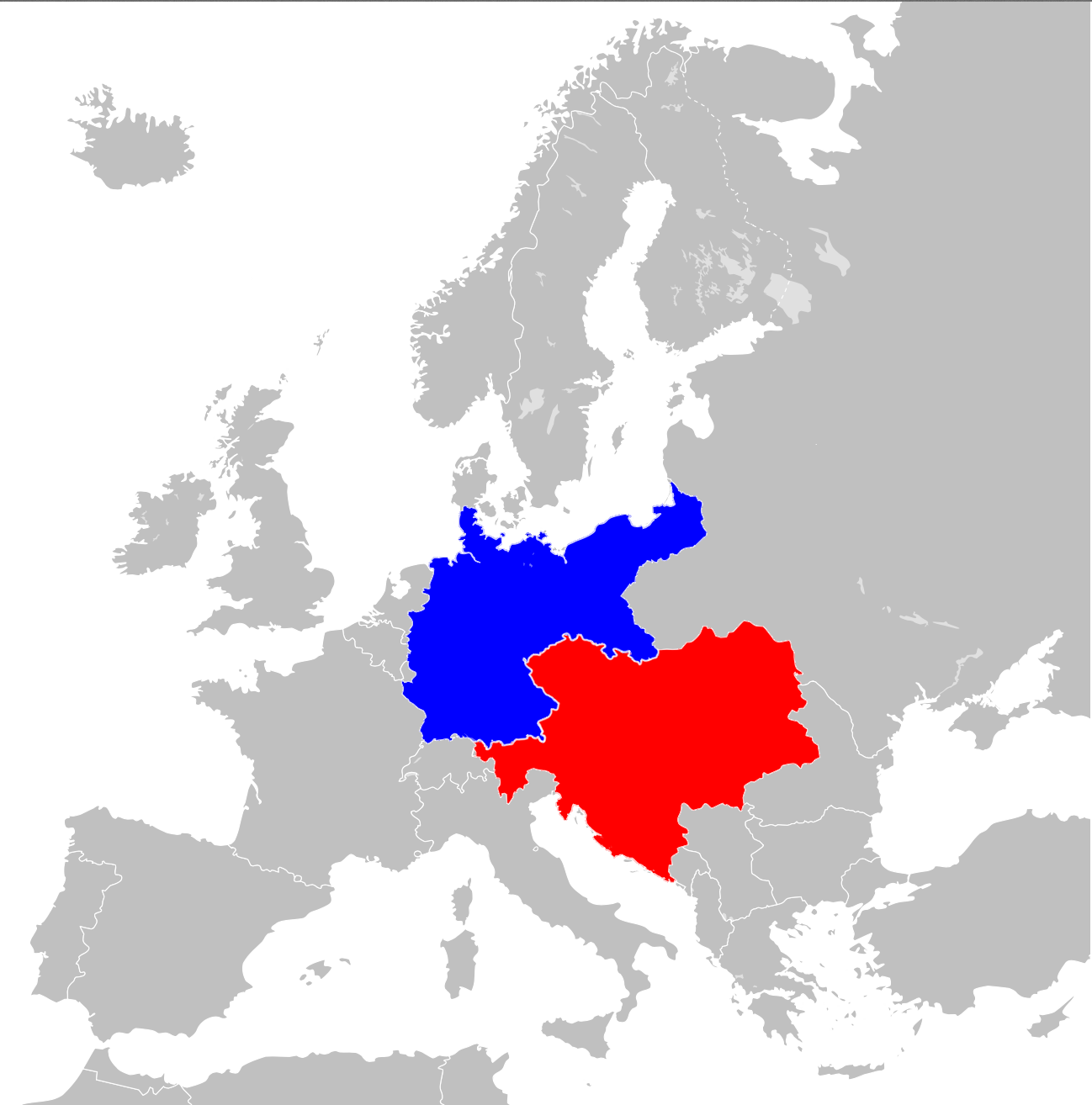
The Dual Alliance in 1914, German Empire in blue and Austro-Hungarian Empire in red

After losing the war, the Habsburgs of Austria-Hungary were overthrown and Kaiser Wilhelm II of Germany abdicated in 1918. Both Germany and Austria became republics and were heavily punished in the Treaty of Versailles (1919) and Treaty of St. Germain-en-Laye (1919). Austria lost over 60% of its pre-war territory (mostly settled by non-Austrians) and was hugely reduced to a rump state, The Republic of German-Austria. The majority in both countries wanted unification with Germany (now the Weimar Republic) into a Greater German nation, but this was strictly forbidden by the Treaty of Versailles to avoid a dominant German state.

On 1 September 1920, the Weimar Republic and Austria concluded an economic agreement. Both countries, however, faced severe economic hardships, hyperinflation, mass unemployment and constant riots after the war. After Austrian-born Adolf Hitler came to power in Germany in 1933, he demanded the right to Anschluss (union) between Austria and Germany. This was initially blocked by the Italian Fascist government under Benito Mussolini, who cooperated with his Austrian counterparts Engelbert Dollfuss and Kurt Schuschnigg, fearing retrospective territorial demands from Hitler on Südtirol (South Tyrol) (lost to Italy in 1919). Mussolini successfully forced Hitler to renounce all claims to Austria on 11 July 1936.

=== Germany absorbs Austria in Anschluss in 1938 ===
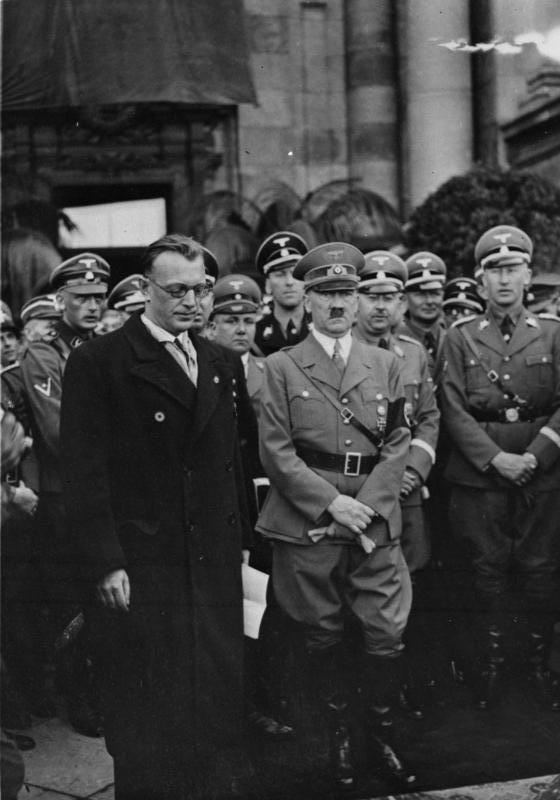
Nazi leader Adolf Hitler, born in Austria, annexed the country into Germany with the Anschluss in 1938.

After 1936, Hitler and Mussolini forged a closer relationship in preparation for Germany's expansionist ambitions. Hitler used the Nazi Party of Austria to influence public opinions and staged a coup against the Austrian Fascist government in 1938. When Hitler decided to refrain from reclaiming South Tyrol, Mussolini abandoned his pledge to protect Austria's independence.

Berlin forcibly joined Austria and Germany in March 1938, despite it being prohibited by the Versailles and St. Germain treaties. France had blocked an attempt to establish a customs union between the two countries in 1931. In 1934, Austrian Nazis attempted a coup d'etat and killed Chancellor Engelbert Dollfuss. However, the coup failed: it was foiled by loyal police and army units, as well as Italian support for Austrian independence. After 1936, Austria was isolated as a result of strategic collaboration between Italy and Germany. Kurt Schuschnigg, the Chancellor of Austria, was pressured by Hitler into accepting Nazi ministers into his government. Despite calling for a plebiscite on Anschluss, Schuschnigg canceled the vote. Arthur Seyss-Inquart was an Austrian Nazi politician who served as minister of police. He did nothing when Nazi supporters sparked anti-Jewish pogroms and political riots in favor of Anschluss. On March 11, Schuschnigg resigned, Seyss-Inquart became chancellor and he invited the German Army to cross the border. Anschluss was declared the next day as Austria became part of Germany.

Britain and France followed Appeasement and did not intervene. Hitler held a plebiscite a month later, claiming a 99% vote in favor of the Anschluss and his rule. Austria's Jews fell under Nazi control. Some managed to escape; the rest were later murdered in the Holocaust. The Anschluss was reversed in 1945, and Austria was occupied by the Allies separately from Germany until 1955. Seyss-Inquart was hanged after being tried at Nuremberg.

=== Re-Independence ===
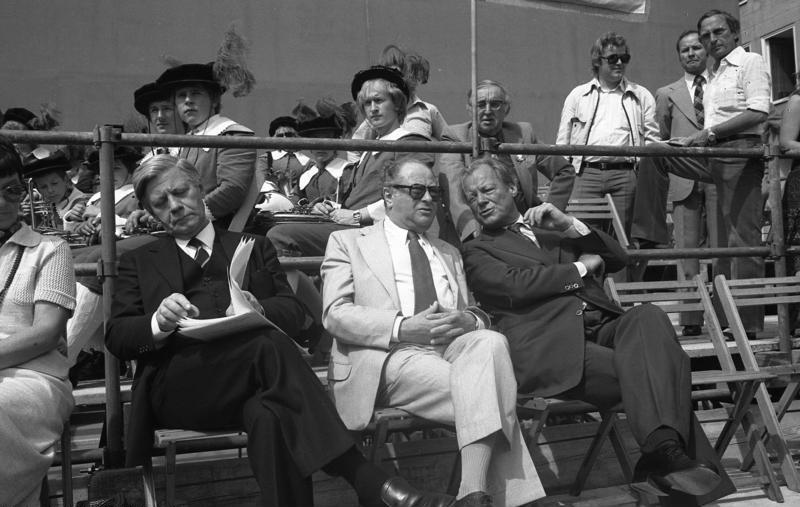
Austrian chancellor Bruno Kreisky with German chancellor Helmut Schmidt and Willy Brandt in 1979

In late April 1945, the Allied Powers entered Austria and removed the country from the Third German Reich. A provisional Austrian government, led by Karl Renner, declared the country's regained independence in the context of after the fall of Third Reich. Austria's democratic constitution was reinstated and elections in late 1945 paved the way for a new federal government. Leopold Figl became the first Chancellor of Austria. Germany, however, was occupied by the Allied Powers and divided into four governing zones: British, French, American and the Soviet. Military occupation of Germany ended in 1949 when such zones were organised into the Federal Republic of Germany (West Germany) and the German Democratic Republic (East Germany).

After the Second World War, there has been no serious effort among the citizens or political parties to unite Germany and Austria. In addition, the Austrian State Treaty forbids such a union and the constitution required Austria's neutrality. A 1987 survey revealed that only 6% of Austrians identified themselves as 'Germans'. Austria began to develop a separate national identity from Germany, although both countries continued to co-operate closely in economic and cultural fields during the Cold War. Moreover, political relations between both countries have been strong and amicable.

In addition to a form of identity in Austria that looked toward Germany, there have also been forms of Austrian identity that rejected reunification of Austria with Germany and German identity on the basis of preserving Austrians' Catholic religious identity from the potential danger posed by being part of a Protestant-majority Germany, as well as their different historical heritage regarding their mainly Celtic (It is location of first Celtic culture and Celts were its first settlers), Slavic, Avar, Rhaethian and Roman origin prior to the colonization of the Germanic Baiuvarii (ancient German Bavarians). In addition; some regions of Austria recognize minority languages as official languages beside German such as Burgenland Croatian, Slovenian, and Hungarian. Austrian German language has been recognized in Austria since 1951.

=== European Union ===
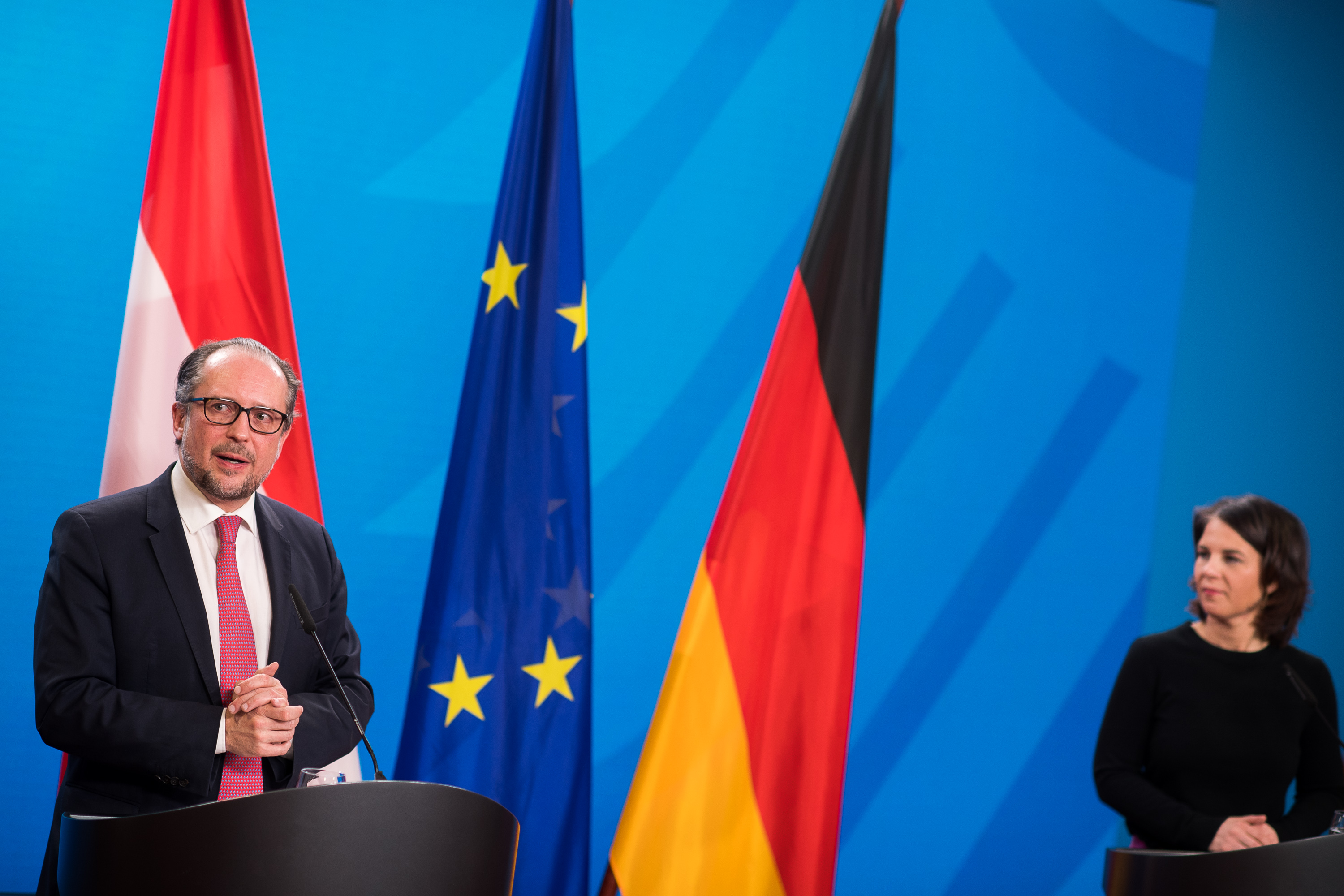
Foreign minister Alexander Schallenberg with German foreign minister Annalena Baerbock in 2022

In 1995, Austria joined the European Union and its Schengen Area. This effectively removed the physical land-border between Germany and Austria and allowed both countries to further consolidate their already strong links. In 1999, Germany and Austria became two of the founding members of the Eurozone and adopted the Euro as their legal currency in 2001.

=== Espionage ===
According to reporting in Der Standard and profil, the Bundesnachrichtendienst engaged in espionage in Austria between 1999 and 2006, spying on targets including the International Atomic Energy Agency, the Organization of the Petroleum Exporting Countries, the Austria Press Agency, embassies, and Austrian banks and government ministries. The government of Austria has called on Germany to clarify the allegations.

=== Cultural cooperation ===
Since 2004, heads of state of the German-speaking countries, including Austria and Germany, have met every year, and the Council for German Orthography has been the main international body regulating German orthography for both countries.

== Resident diplomatic missions ==
- Austria has an embassy in Berlin and a consulate-general in Munich;
- Germany has an embassy in Vienna.

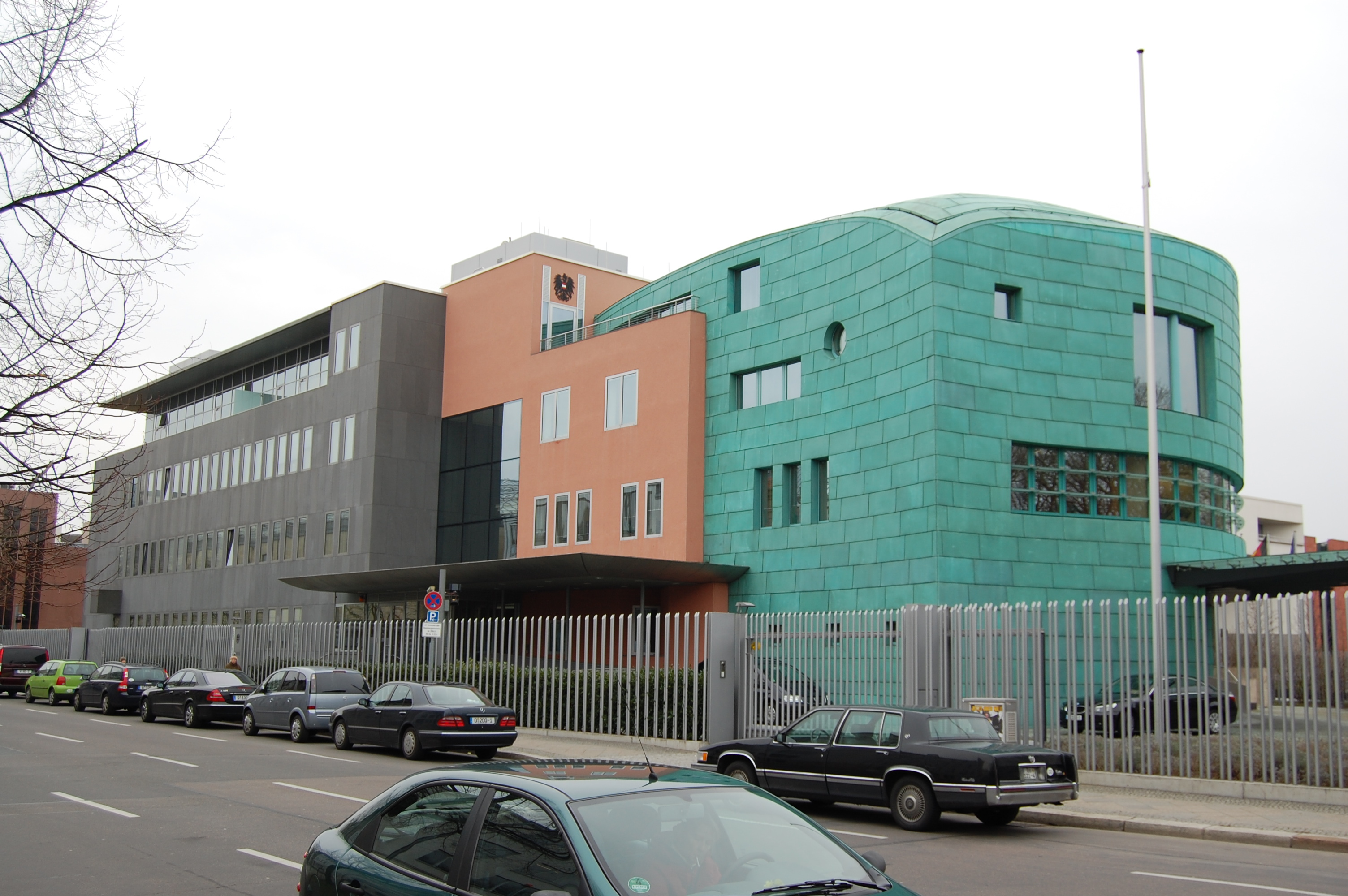
Embassy of Austria in Berlin

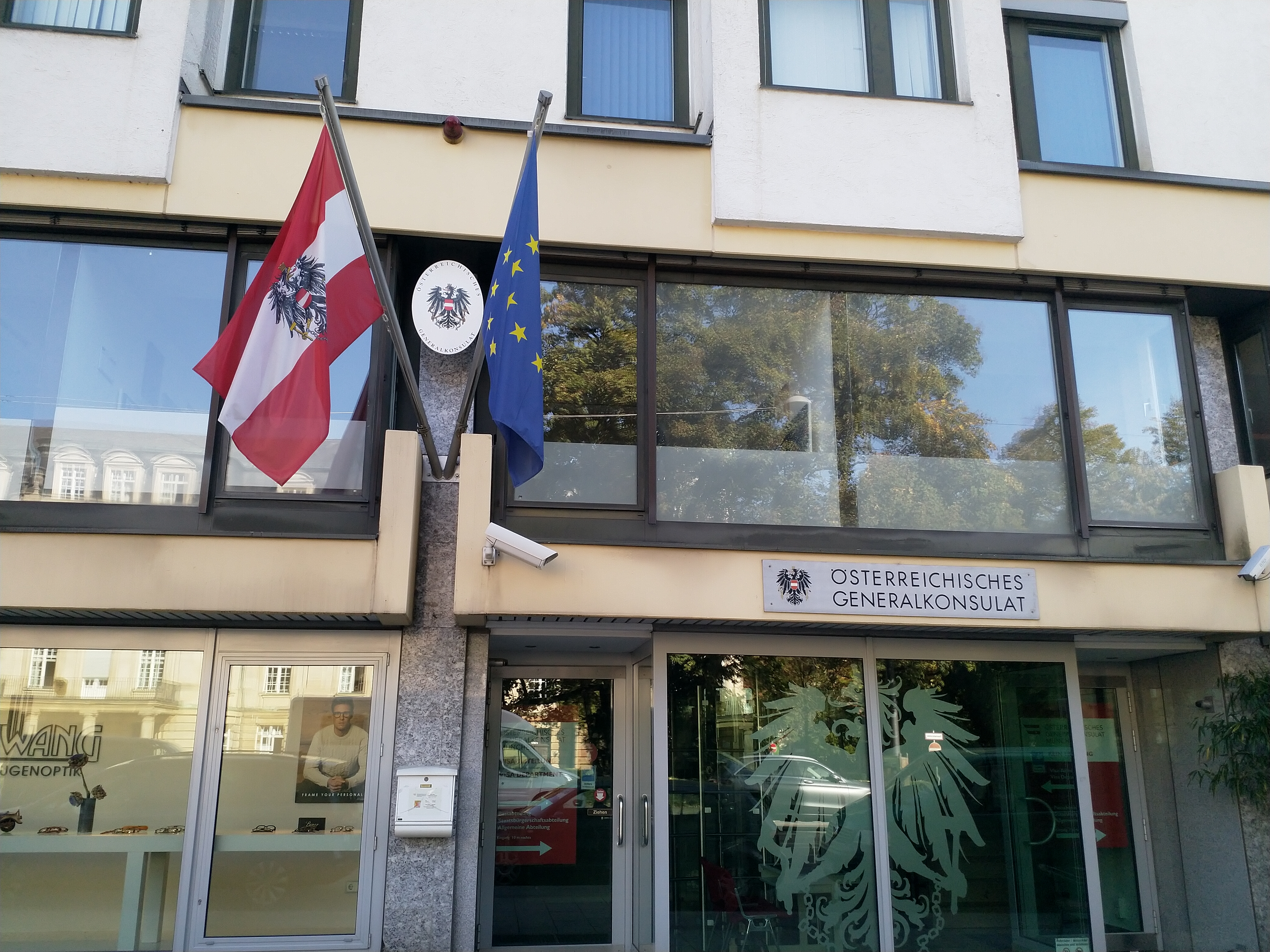
Consulate-General of Austria in Munich

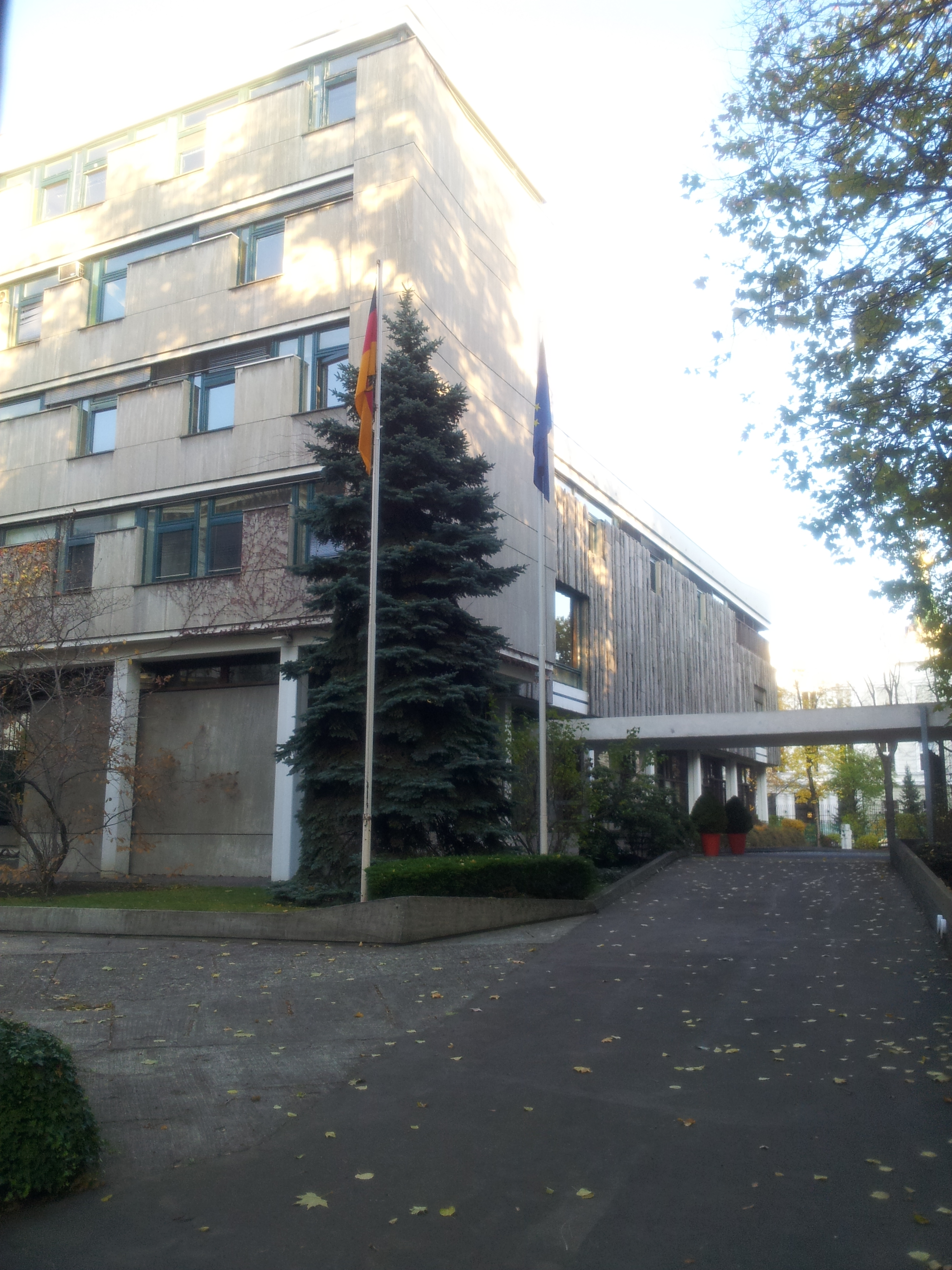
Embassy of Germany in Vienna

== See also ==
- German nationalism in Austria
- List of ambassadors of Austria to Germany
- List of ambassadors of Germany to Austria
- Pan-Germanism
- Austria–NATO relations
- European Union–NATO relations
