= Max Mandl-Maldenau =

Austrian industrialist and art collector (1865–1942)

Max Mandl-Maldenau (born Mandl; 3 August 1865 – 6 August 1942) was an Austrian industrialist, member of the Vienna Stock Exchange, and art collector.

== Life ==
Mandl was born on 3 August 1865 in Prostějov, then part of the Margraviate of Moravia within the Austrian Empire. He was the third and youngest son of Mayr Mandl (1821–1888), a tailor from Prostějov who succeeded in establishing a major clothing manufacturer based in Vienna, M. & I. Mandl und Schnek, Kohnberger & Mandl.

Regarded as a noted industrialist, Mandl-Maldenau managed branches of a weaving mill and leather wholesaler in Vienna and Königinhof an der Elbe. He was a member of the Vienna Stock Exchange (Wiener Börse), and served on its panel of arbitrators for more than twenty years before being elected senior vice-president of the Exchange in 1928. He was re-elected to that position in subsequent years, up to and including 1937.

In 1921, he married Elsa Pollak-Parnau. They lived in Vienna on Kochgasse 14, which contained valuable furnishings.

He received significant state honours. In 1914, he was awarded the Officer's Cross of the Order of Franz Joseph. In 1917, he was made a Knight (Ritter) and granted a coat of arms by a charter of Charles I of Austria, in recognition of his funding of a new hospital in Vienna. This gave him the title "Ritter Mandl von Maldenau" until the fall of the Austro-Hungarian monarchy the following year, at which point he took Austrian citizenship under the name Mandl-Maldenau. In 1936, he was awarded the Knight's Cross 1st Class of the Österreichischer Verdienstorden by the President of Austria.

== Art collection ==
The Mandl-Maldenau art collection included paintings by artists such as Jan van Eyck, Jacob van Ruisdael, and Jacopo Bassano. When Austria was annexed by Nazi Germany in the Anschluss of 1938, Mandl-Maldenau and his family were forced to flee the Nazis on account of his Jewish origins. Their firm was "Arianised", and the art collection was acquired by Nazi dealer Friedrich Welz. Elsa fled to France, where she died in 1939, while Max escaped to Portugal and died on 6 August 1942 in Lisbon.

In 1953, their son-in-law Richard L. Winton-Wiener made enquiries through the Federal Monuments Office (Bundesdenkmalamt), but without success. In 1962, the Mandl-Maldenaus' children filed claims with the fund for compensation for loss of property (Fonds zur Abgeltung von Vermögensverlusten), receiving some compensation for seized property in 1966. Following a 2009 recommendation by the Art Restitution Panel (Kunstrückgabebeirat) of the Commission for Provenance Research established under the Art Restitution Law of 1998, the Österreichische Galerie returned Johann Peter Krafft's Male Portrait in 2011.

The Mandl-Mandenau heirs have registered search requests for five further artworks that were seized under the Nazis on the German Lost Art Foundation Database. These include The Monk painted by Ferdinand Georg Waldmüller in 1841 and The Blind Cow Game, painted by Peter Fendi.
