= Martha Liebermann =

German Jewish woman (1857–1943)

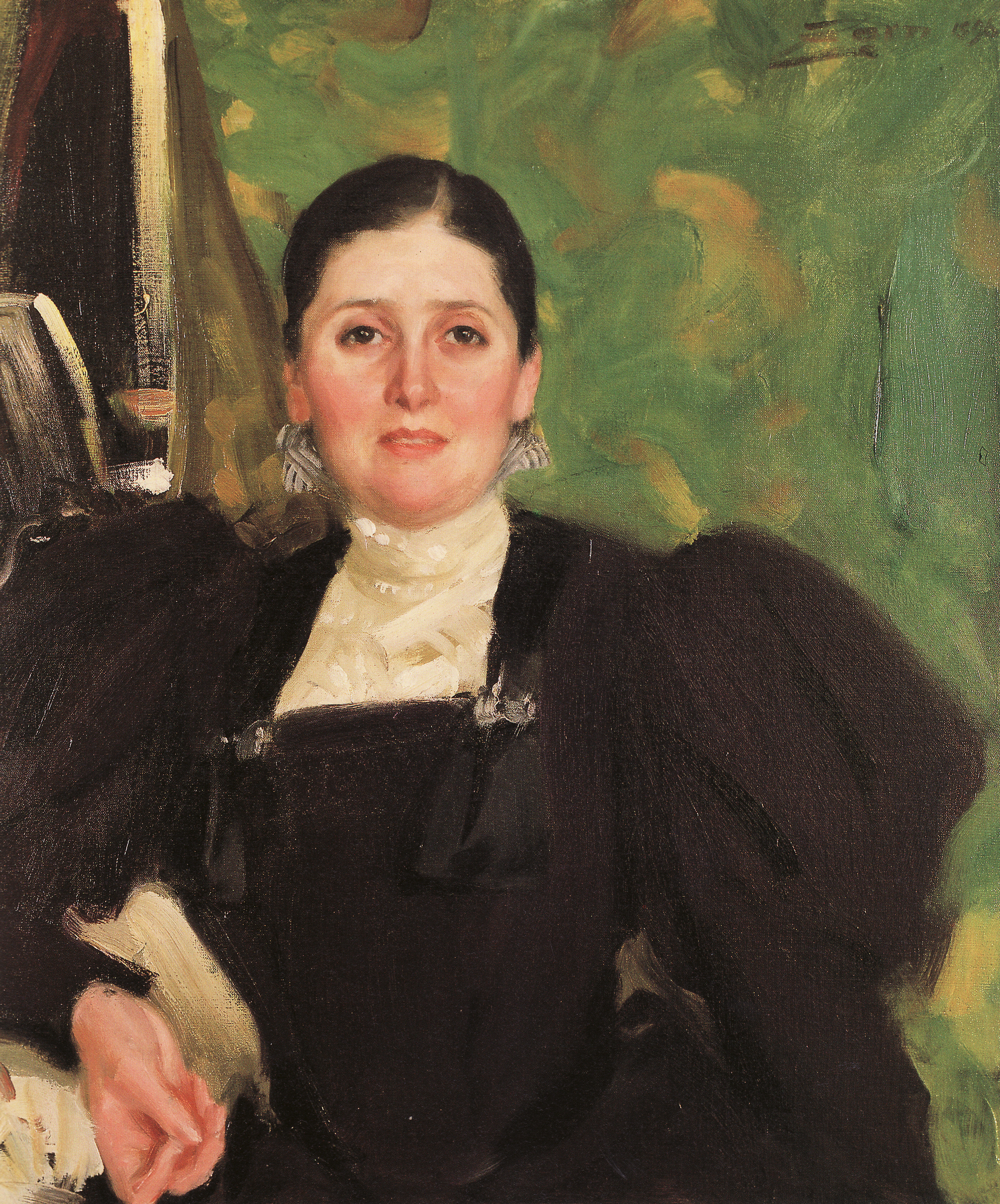
- Martha Liebermann in a portrait by Anders Zorn (1896)
- Born: Martha Marckwald; October 8, 1857; Berlin, Kingdom of Prussia
- Died: 10 March 1943 (aged 85); Berlin, Nazi Germany
- Spouse: Max Liebermann (m. 1884; died 1935)
- Relatives: Kurt Riezler (son-in-law)

Martha Liebermann (née Marckwald; 8 October 1857 – 10 March 1943), was a German Jewish woman, known as the wife of the painter Max Liebermann. She committed suicide the day before her planned deportation to the Theresienstadt Ghetto.

== Life ==
=== Early years and marriage ===
Martha was the fourth child of the German Jewish couple Ottilie and Heinrich Benjamin Marckwald, who ran a wool store in Berlin. She grew up with four siblings in a wealthy Jewish merchant family in that city. After the death of her father in 1870, Louis Liebermann, Max Liebermann's father, became guardian of the Marckwald children.

The union of the Marckwald and Liebermann families resulted in two marriages. First, Martha's older sister Elsbeth married the entrepreneur Georg Liebermann, Max's older brother. On 14 September 1884, Martha and Max Liebermann got married. Their marriage would last until his death in 1935.

The couple's only child, Käthe Liebermann, was born in August 1885. In 1892 the family moved into the second floor of the Liebermann house at Pariser Platz 7.

In 1904, Martha Liebermann suffered from breast cancer. She overcame the illness after being operated by James Israel, the chief physician at the Jewish Hospital Berlin. In 1910, the family moved into their newly built summer house at the Wannsee, the Liebermann Villa, which was built by Paul Baumgarten.

=== Final years ===
Martha Liebermann became a widow when her husband died on 8 February 1935, after 50 years of marriage, in the house on Pariser Platz. In the same year, Martha moved into an apartment at Graf-Spee-Straße 23 (today: Hiroshimastraße) in the neighboring Tiergartenviertel (then: Berlin W35). As a result of the persecution of Jews in Nazi Germany, she lost her two houses on Pariser Platz and Wannsee, and almost her entire fortune. In 1940, Martha was forced by the Nazis to sell her villa to the Reichspost below market value, but even that way she wasn't paid the sales proceeds.

After the Kristallnacht, in November 1938, Martha's daughter, Käthe, left Germany with her daughter and her husband Kurt Riezler, moving to the United States.

Beginning in 1941, Martha tried unsuccessfully to emigrate to Switzerland or Sweden, both neutral countries. The emigration failed due to the high financial demands of the Nazi government, who tried to extort foreign currency from her helpers, the art dealer Walter Feilchenfeldt and the collector Oskar Reinhart, at the expense of the widow of a world-famous painter. In March 1942, Prince Eugen, Duke of Närke tried to obtain an exit permit to the United States for Martha Liebermann; Charles Edward, Duke of Saxe-Coburg and Gotha, passed this concern to Reinhard Heydrich, without taking further action.

On 5 March 1943, she was to be deported to Theresienstadt Ghetto, even aged 85 years old. She was found by a police officer in a coma, having taken an overdose of Veronal to avoid deportation. She survived five more days, before dying on 10 March 1943, in the Jewish Hospital in Berlin.

== Burial ==
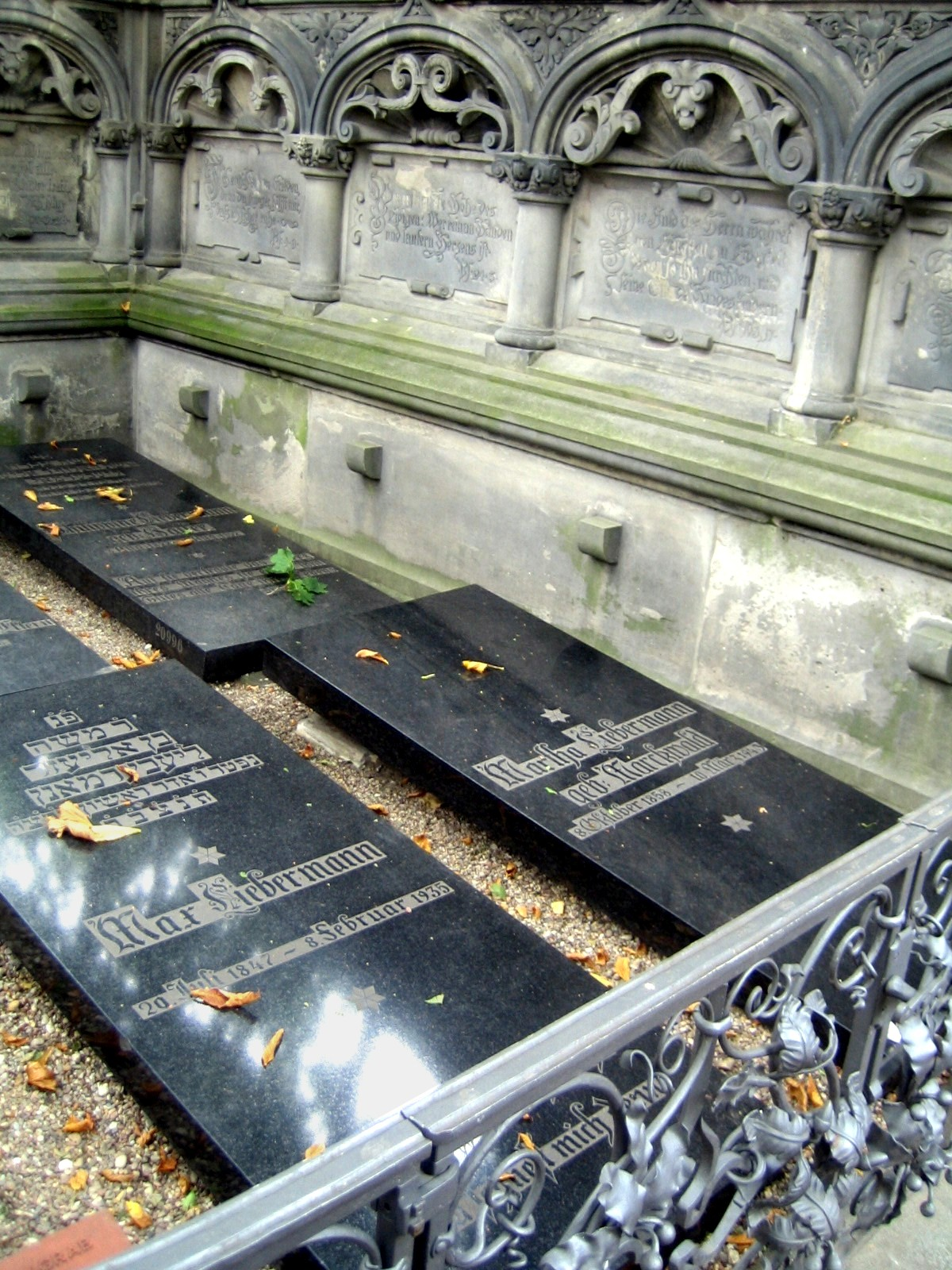
The Liebermann family grave at the Schönhauser Allee Jewish cemetery

Since the Jüdischer Friedhof Schönhauser Allee, where Max Liebermann was buried, had been confiscated by the Nazi authorities, Martha Liebermann was buried in the Weißensee cemetery. After the war, on 11 May 1954, she was transferred to the Jüdischer Friedhof Schönhauser Allee and buried next to her husband.

== Memorial ==
Martha Liebermann is remembered with a Stolperstein in front of the Max-Liebermann-Haus, in Berlin.

== Cultural depictions ==
Her last days are the subject of the German film Martha Liebermann – Ein gestohlenes Leben (2021), where she is portrayed by Thekla Carola Wied.
