= Kurt Riezler =

German philosopher and diplomat (1882–1955)

- Born: 11 February 1882; Munich, German Empire
- Died: 6 September 1955 (aged 73); Munich, West Germany
- Occupations: Philosopher, politician, diplomat, journalist

Kurt Riezler (11 February 1882 – 5 September 1955) was a German philosopher and diplomat. A top-level cabinet adviser in the German Empire and the Weimar Republic, he negotiated Germany's underwriting of Russia's October Revolution and authored the 1914 September Program which outlined German war aims during World War I. The posthumous publication of his secret notes and diaries played a role in the "Fischer Controversy" among German historians in the early 1960s.

== Early life ==
Riezler was born in Munich in 1882 to a prominent Catholic family; his grandfather had co-founded the Bayerische Hypotheken- und Wechselbank (now HypoVereinsbank, UniCredit Group). He studied classics at the Ludwig-Maximilians-Universität München and was granted his doctorate in economic history with highest honors in 1905. His prize-winning thesis on the Oikonomika, a classical Greek treatise once attributed to Aristotle, was soon published. After working as a journalist for the Norddeutsche Allgemeine Zeitung, a semi-official newspaper, he joined the press section of the German Foreign Office in 1907 and attracted the attention of Wilhelm II. When Theobald von Bethmann Hollweg became chancellor of Germany in 1909, Riezler became his chief adviser and confidant.

== Political career ==
Riezler's duties in the chancellor's office concerned primarily, but not exclusively, foreign policy. In 1914, he authored the September Program which proposed as possible German war aims limited annexations, a hard peace for France, and a Belgian vassal state. In October 1917 he was posted to the German embassy in Stockholm to arrange a cease-fire on the Eastern Front, and then to Moscow as the top aide to Germany's ambassador to Russia, Count Wilhelm von Mirbach. Riezler was an eyewitness to Mirbach's assassination by the Left Socialist-Revolutionaries on 9 July 1918, having unwittingly ushered the gunman Yakov Blumkin into Mirbach's presence.

During this period, Riezler served as the conduit for German subsidies to the Bolsheviks and personally negotiated these with Lenin's representatives Karl Radek and Alexander Parvus. Riezler later claimed privately that it had been his own idea to transport Lenin in the famous "sealed train" from Zurich through Germany to Russia in April 1917.

Following the war, Riezler became a staunch supporter of the Weimar Republic. He joined the German Democratic Party, contributed regularly to the pro-Weimar newspaper Die Deutsche Nation, and served as the Foreign Office's representative during the drafting of the Weimar Constitution. From November 1919 until April 1920 he was chief of cabinet to President Friedrich Ebert and played a central role in suppressing the Bavarian Soviet Republic and the Kapp Putsch.

== Academic career ==
In 1927, he was named Kurator of the University of Frankfurt am Main, to which he attracted a distinguished faculty that included Ernst Kantorowicz, Adolph Lowe, Karl Mannheim, Paul Tillich, and Max Wertheimer. Riezler consequently played a crucial role in the 1930 inception of the Frankfurt School; for example, it was Riezler who recommended Herbert Marcuse to Max Horkheimer. Because of his concurrent appointment to the philosophy faculty, Riezler was also prominent in German philosophical circles. In 1929, Riezler sided with Martin Heidegger during the famous "Davos encounter" with Ernst Cassirer and wrote an eyewitness account of this event, "Davoser Hochschulkurse 1929," for the Neue Zürcher Zeitung.

Riezler was forced out of the University of Frankfurt am Main in April 1933 by the Nazis but, having been allowed by them to draw his pension, remained in Germany for the next five years, publishing books on aesthetics and Parmenides.

== Emigration ==
In late 1938, he contacted the Kreisau Circle, an aristocratic anti-Nazi faction, and soon immigrated to the United States to accept a professorship in philosophy at the New School for Social Research. He was to remain at that institution until his retirement, interspersed with visiting professorships at Columbia University and the University of Chicago. During this period he became a close friend and colleague of the political philosopher Leo Strauss, who devoted the final chapter of his book What is Political Philosophy? to Riezler. Noting that Riezler's philosophy was "shaped by both the influence of Heidegger and the reaction to him," Strauss concludes that it "was ultimately because he grasped the meaning of shame and awe that Riezler was a liberal, a lover of privacy."

Kurt Riezler returned to Europe in 1954, lived for some time in Rome and died in Munich in 1955. He was preceded in death by his wife Käthe (1885-1952), daughter of Martha Liebermann and impressionist painter Max Liebermann. His survivors included their daughter Maria (1917-1995), wife of Howard B. White (1912-1974), a New School professor of political philosophy who had been Leo Strauss's first graduate student; and his brother Walter Riezler (1878-1965), a prominent musicologist, art historian and associate of the Deutscher Werkbund.

== Selected works ==
- 1906. Das zweite Buch der Pseudoaristotelischen Ökonomik. Berlin: Norddeutsche Buchdruckerei und Verlagsanstalt.
- 1907. Über Finanzen und Monopole im alten Griechenland. Berlin: Puttkammer & Mühlbrecht.
- 1913. Die Erforderlichkeit des Unmöglichen: Prolegomena zu einer Theorie der Politik und zu anderen Theorien. München: G. Müller Verlag
- 1914. Grundzüge der Weltpolitik in der Gegenwart (pseudonym J. J. Ruedorffer). Stuttgart & Berlin: Deutsche Verlags-Anstalt. Grundzüge der Weltpolitik in der Gegenwart (1914); Grundzüge
- 1920. Die drei Krisen; eine Untersuchung über den gegenwärtigen politischen Weltzustand (pseudonym J. J. Ruedorffer). Stuttgart & Berlin: Deutsche Verlags-Anstalt.
- 1924. Gestalt und Gesetz; Entwurf einer Metaphysik der Freiheit. München: Musarion Verlag.
- 1928. "Die Krise der `Wirklichkeit`." Die Naturwissenschaften, 16
- 1929. Über Gebundenheit und Freiheit des gegenwärtigen Zeitalters. Bonn: F. Cohen.
- 1934. Parmenides. Frankfurt am Main: Vittorio Klostermann.
- 1935. Traktat vom Schönen. Zur Ontologie der Kunst. Frankfurt am Main: Vittorio Klostermann.
- 1936. "The Homeric Simile and the Beginning of Philosophy". The St. John's Review: 71–80.
- 1940. Physics and Reality; Lectures of Aristotle on Modern Physics at an International Congress of Science. New Haven, CT: Yale University Press. Complete text here: Kurt Riezler's
- 1941. "Play and Seriousness." Journal of Philosophy, Vol. 38, No. 19
- 1943. "Comment on the Social Psychology of Shame." American Journal of Sociology, Vol. 48, No. 4
- 1943. "Homer's Contribution to the Meaning of Truth." Philosophy and Phenomenological Research, Vol. 3, No. 3
- 1943. "On the Psychology of Modern Revolution." Social Research, Vol. 10
- 1944. "The Social Psychology of Fear." American Journal of Sociology, Vol. 49, No. 6
- 1944. "What Is Public Opinion?" Social Research, Vol. 11
- 1944. "Forward" to Max Wertheimer, "Gestalt Theory." Social Research, Vol. 11
- 1948. "The Historian and Truth." Journal of Philosophy, Vol. 45, No. 14
- 1949. "Reflections on Human Rights." Human Rights, Comments and Interpretations, UNESCO.
- 1951. Man, Mutable and Immutable: The Fundamental Structure of Social Life. Chicago: Regnery.
- 1954. "Political Decisions in Modern Society." Ethics, Vol. 64, No. 2
