= Meeting of the heads of state of German-speaking countries =

Diplomatic conference

The Meeting of the heads of state of the German-speaking countries is an annual one- to two-day informal gathering of the heads of state of those European countries that have German as one of their official languages at the national level. The summit has been held every summer or fall since 2004, except for 2020. The conference venue rotates between the participating countries.

== Name and concept ==
The meetings do not yet have an officially established title. In addition to Meeting of the Heads of State of the German-speaking Countries, the participants and the press have also used Meeting of the German-speaking Heads of State, Summit of the German-speaking Heads of State, Meeting of the German-speaking Countries/States or other names.

The summits of the German-speaking countries are not a formalized language organization such as the Organisation internationale de la Francophonie, but rather informal, but regular, one to two-day working meetings at the invitation of a head of state. The participating representatives are usually accompanied by their spouses or partners, who, similar to the G7 summits, follow a so-called "ladies' program" parallel to the meeting. In addition to a cultural program, political topics are also discussed, but no binding declarations are declared on the summits. Due to Germany's quantitative dominance (it accounts for almost 75% of the approximately 112 million inhabitants of the six countries represented at the meetings), emphasis was placed from the outset on an equal and non-binding exchange. This is expressed, among other things, by not including economic representatives and limiting attendance to representative participants (heads of state instead of heads of government).

== History ==
Political working meetings of certain government ministers of the German-speaking countries had already taken place before 2004 as required, but no high-profile meetings at the highest level. The proposal for such a meeting came from the Austrian President Heinz Fischer in 2004, after his Swiss colleague Joseph Deiss had expressed the wish for more exchange with the European Union within the framework of the German-speaking countries ("Lake Constance format"). After an initial meeting in St. Gallen, follow-up meetings were agreed and Liechtenstein's Hereditary Prince Alois was invited for the following year. Since 2014, the heads of state of Belgium and Luxembourg have also taken part alongside the heads of state of Germany, Austria, Switzerland and Liechtenstein.

== Members ==
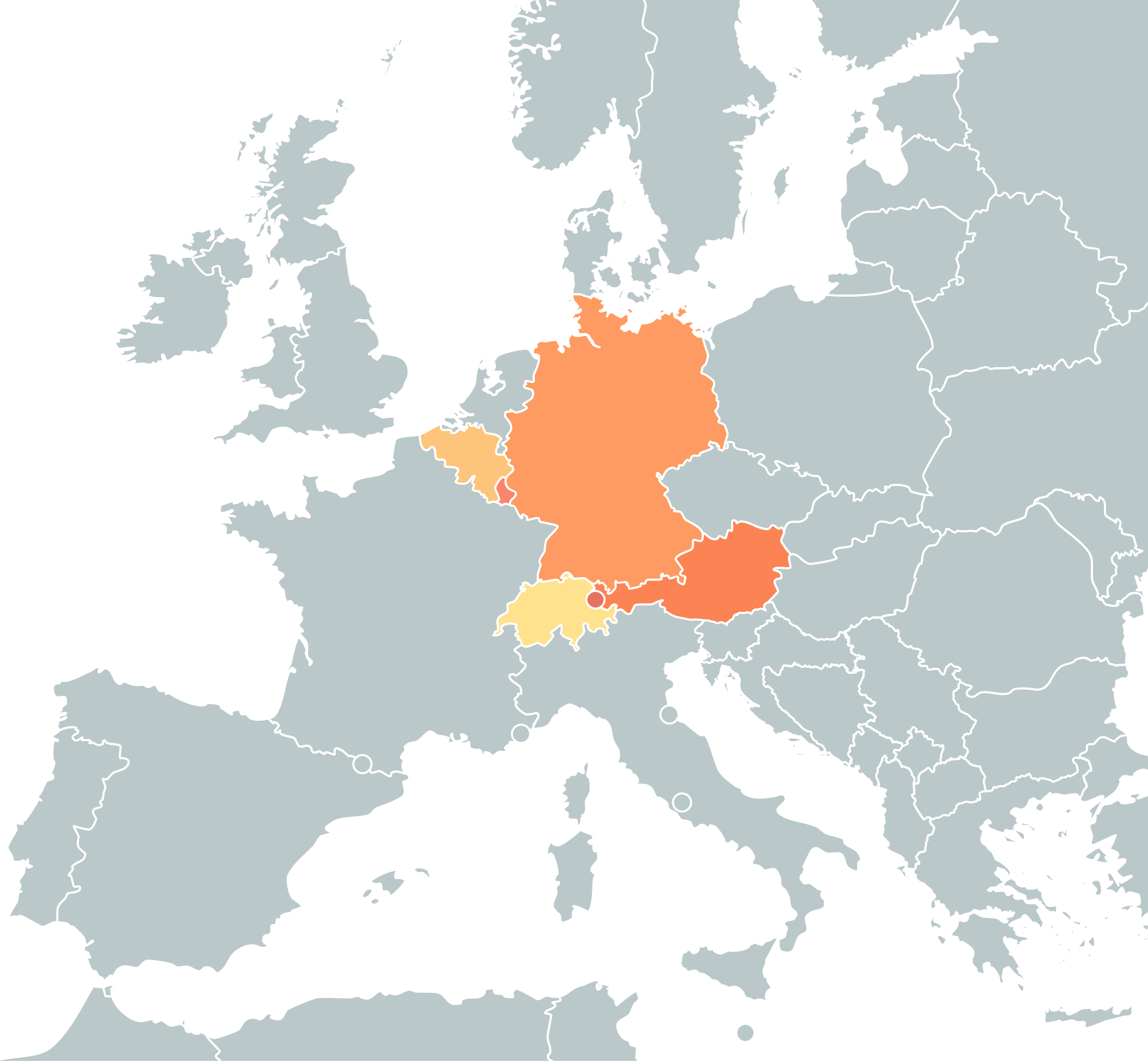
Participating countries

The following countries had sent their heads of state to the meeting:

- Austria
- Belgium
- Germany
- Liechtenstein
- Luxembourg
- Switzerland

While the chairman of the German-speaking Community of Belgium, Karl-Heinz Lambertz, saw the participation of King Philippe, who speaks very little German, in the meetings as a historic recognition of Belgium's multilingualism, there were also critical voices in Luxembourg. As representatives of Luxembourg had previously classified their country as a Luxembourgish-speaking and not a German- or French-speaking country, Grand Duke Henri's participation in the meetings initially led to a certain amount of controversy, with both positive and negative voices in the Luxembourg press. The meeting was also referred to as the "German Confederation" in Luxembourg due to its similar geographical extent and as a dig at Germany's perceived dominance.

The absence of representatives from areas with a similar or even higher number of German speakers than Liechtenstein or Belgium, namely South Tyrol (Trentino-Alto Adige region, Italy) and Poland, was also questioned and explained, among other things, by historical considerations. Furthermore, in Italy, unlike Belgium, German is only an official language in Trentino-Alto Adige, but not at national level. As this region is not a sovereign state, it does not have a representative head of state who could participate in accordance with the concept of the meetings. The situation is similar in all other countries with recognized German-speaking minorities, e.g. Hungary, Romania, Poland, Namibia or Denmark.

== List of summits ==
No.	Date	Host country	Host city	Participants
1	20 November 2004	Switzerland	St. Gallen	Austria, Germany, Switzerland
2	24 October 2005	Austria	Salzburg	Austria, Germany, Liechtenstein, Switzerland
3	6 November 2006	Germany	Meersburg	Austria, Germany, Liechtenstein, Switzerland
4	29 October 2007	Liechtenstein	Vaduz	Austria, Germany, Liechtenstein, Switzerland
5	25 November 2008	Switzerland	Rapperswil	Austria, Germany, Liechtenstein, Switzerland
6	28 October 2009	Austria	Eisenstadt	Austria, Liechtenstein, Switzerland
7	1 November 2010	Germany	Lübeck	Austria, Germany, Liechtenstein, Switzerland
8	26 September 2011	Liechtenstein	Vaduz	Austria, Germany, Liechtenstein, Switzerland
9	11 June 2012	Switzerland	Chur	Austria, Germany, Liechtenstein, Switzerland
10	9 September 2013	Austria	Innsbruck	Austria, Germany, Liechtenstein, Switzerland
11	18 September 2014	Germany	Bad Doberan, Rostock	Austria, Belgium, Germany, Liechtenstein, Luxembourg, Switzerland
12	17 September 2015	Liechtenstein	Vaduz	Austria, Belgium, Germany, Liechtenstein, Luxembourg, Switzerland
13	8 September 2016	Belgium	Brussels, Eupen	Belgium, Germany, Liechtenstein, Luxembourg, Switzerland
14	27 September 2017	Luxembourg	Luxembourg City	Austria, Belgium, Germany, Liechtenstein, Luxembourg, Switzerland
15	5–6 September 2018	Switzerland	Sils im Engadin/Segl	Austria, Belgium, Germany, Liechtenstein, Luxembourg, Switzerland
16	3–4 June 2019	Austria	Linz	Austria, Belgium, Germany, Liechtenstein, Luxembourg, Switzerland
17	2020	Cancelled because of the COVID-19 pandemic		
18	28 June 2021	Germany	Potsdam	Austria, Belgium, Germany, Liechtenstein, Luxembourg, Switzerland
19	12–13 September 2022	Liechtenstein	Vaduz, Schaan	Belgium, Germany, Liechtenstein, Luxembourg, Switzerland
20	11–12 September 2023	Belgium	Brussels, Eupen	Austria, Belgium, Germany, Liechtenstein, Luxembourg, Switzerland
21	16–17 September 2024	Luxembourg	Colmar-Berg, Esch-Alzette	Belgium, Germany, Liechtenstein, Luxembourg, Switzerland
22	4–5 September 2025	Switzerland	Bad Ragaz, St. Gallen	Austria, Belgium, Germany, Liechtenstein, Luxembourg, Switzerland
23	1-2 September 2026	Austria	Innsbruck, Stubai Glacier and Alpbach	Austria, Belgium,Germany,Luxembourg, Liechtenstein, Switzerland

== See also ==
- Holy Roman Empire
- German Confederation
- List of countries where German is an official language
