= Josef Morgenstern =

Josef Morgenstern (born 6 June 1886 in Kis-Szlatina, Hungary; died after September 1942 in Auschwitz) was a Jewish art collector who was murdered by Nazis during the Holocaust.

== Early life ==
Josef Morgenstern worked in the banking and tube industries in Vienna and Amsterdam from the 1920s. He studied political science at the University of Vienna, receiving his doctorate in 1928. Morgenstern was accepted as a supporting member of the Central Association of Architects in 1921. He married Alice née Freund (born 1885 in Prag). In March 1922 the Morgensterns acquired a home at Apfelgasse 3, Vienna 4, furnished by architect Otto Bauer.

== Art collection ==
Morgenstern collected various pieces of art. In the music room of his Vienna home hung the painting Vier Bäume (Four Trees) by Egon Schiele, which was to be shown at exhibitions in the Neue Galerie in Vienna and the Kunsthaus in Zurich in 1928 and 1930. The exact contents of the rest of collection is unknown.

== Nazi persecution ==
When Austria joined Nazi Germany in the Anschluss of March 1938, the Morgensterns were persecuted because they were Jewish. His employer, the limited partnership Kontinentale Eisenhandelsgesellschaft Kern & CoMorgenstern, fired him from his job as deputy head of the Röhrenkartell office in May 1938. The Morgensterns attempted unsuccessfully to flee to North America. Alice and Josef Morgenstern left Vienna for Yugoslavia on 13 August 1938 to the island of Korčula. In December 1938, they traveled to Brussels thanks to a work visa that Morgenstern was able to obtain in Zagreb. However, when German troops invaded Belgium in May 1940, Josef was arrested and deported to southern France, where he was imprisoned in the Saint-Cyprien camp. At the end of 1940, he was transferred to the Gurs camp and later to the Drancy transit camp. On 9 September 1942 Josef Morgenstern was deported on the 30th deportation transport to Auschwitz, where he was murdered at an unknown date. Alice Morgenstern remained in hiding in Brussels with the help of her lodger. She died on 25 October 1970 in poverty in a Jewish old people's home in Brussels. Josef Morgenstern's only brother and all three of Alice Morgenstern's sisters were murdered by Nazis in the Holocaust.

== Restitution claims for Nazi-looted art ==
On 26 August 1959 Holocaust survivor Alice Morgenstern, the widow of Josef Morgenstern murdered in Auschwitz, filed a claim to the Finanzlandesdirektion für Wien, Niederösterreich und das Burgenland (Provincial Tax Office for Vienna, Lower Austria and Burgenland in which she stated, "the picture Four Trees by Egon Schiele, which used to be owned by us, is now hanging in the Upper Belvedere. We never sold the picture but gave it to a friend, Robert Röhrl, lawyer in Vienna, Gumpendorferstrasse, for safekeeping. He unfortunately died, and I do not know how the picture landed in the nineteenth-century [recte twentieth-century] collection in the Belvedere." On 20 March 2020 the Austrian Advisory Commission recommended that the Schiele be restituted to Morgenstern's heirs

According to the restitution report, a false provenance had been registered in 1946, with Morgenstern's name replaced by that of Wengraf.

"Whether the name “Dr. Wengraf” was entered deliberately to hide the fact that the picture was owned in 1938 by Josef Morgenstern can only be speculated at. The art dealer Paul Wengraf acquired the picture in 1917 directly from the artist. Bruno Grimschitz, who was relieved of his post as director of the Österreichische Galerie in October 1945 on account of his membership of the NSDAP, must have known the former owner, Josef Morgenstern, who loaned the painting for the Schiele-Gedächtnisausstellung in 1928. As mentioned earlier, Grimschitz wrote the foreword to the exhibition catalogue"
