= History of the Jews in Austria =

Austrian Jews עסטרײַכישע ייִדן יהדות אוסטריה Österreichische Juden
- The location of Austria (dark green) in Europe

Total population
- 5400

Regions with significant populations

Languages
- Austrian German, Yiddish, Hebrew

Religion
- Judaism

Related ethnic groups
- Other Jews (Ashkenazi, Sephardic, Mizrahi), German Jews, Czech Jews, Polish Jews, Hungarian Jews, Russian Jews, Ukrainian Jews

The history of the Jews in Austria starts after the exodus of Jews from Judea under Roman occupation. There have been Jews in Austria since the 3rd century CE. Over the course of many centuries, the political status of the community rose and fell many times: during certain periods, the Jewish community prospered and enjoyed political equality, and during other periods it suffered pogroms, deportations to concentration camps and mass murder, and further antisemitism.

The Holocaust drastically reduced the Jewish community in Austria and only 8,140 Jews remained in Austria according to the 2001 census. As of 2020, Austria had a Jewish population of 10,300 and a total of 33,000 when including any Austrian with at least one Jewish grandparent.

== Antiquity ==
Jews have been in Austria since at least the 3rd century CE. In 2008, a team of archeologists discovered a third-century CE amulet in the form of a gold scroll with the words of the Jewish prayer Shema Yisrael inscribed on it in the grave of a Jewish infant in Halbturn. It is considered to be the earliest surviving evidence of a Jewish presence in modern-day Austria.

It is thought the first Jews immigrated to Austria following the Roman legions after the Roman occupation of Israel. Roman legions who participated in the occupation and came back after the First Jewish–Roman War are said to have brought back Jewish prisoners.

== The Middle Ages ==
A document from the 10th century that determined equal rights between the Jewish and Christian merchants along the Danube implies a Jewish population in Vienna at this point, though again, there is no concrete proof.

Jews first settled in Vienna in the late 12th century. Shlom, a mint master for Duke Leopold V , is the first documented settler Jew in Vienna. He gave coins for silver production, owned land and a vineyard in and around Vienna, and built a synagogue (in today’s Seitenstettengasse 2). He was murdered along with 15 members of his household by Crusaders travelling through Vienna in 1196. In the same century, the Jewish settlement in Vienna increased with the absorption of Jewish settlers from Bavaria and from the Rhineland.

At the start of the 13th century, the Jewish community began to flourish. One of the main reasons for the prosperity was the declaration by Holy Roman Emperor Frederick II.The declaration by Holy Roman Emperor Frederick II held that the Jews were a separate ethnic and religious group and were not bound to the laws targeting the Christian population. This charter was issued to encourage Austrian Jews to lend money and likely also to attract affluent Jews to Austria, which was in need of credit at the time. Issued in July 1244 by Duke Frederick II of Babenberg, the Fridericianum granted Austria's Jewish population legal equality with the Christian populace, trade rights, and judicial autonomy. The "Fridericianum," regarded by the historian J.E. Scherer as a "sparkling star in a dark night," served as the model for privileges granted to Jews across central Europe, including Poland, Hungary, and Bohemia., which had high concentrations of Jews.The charter remained in effect across Austria proper until the expulsion of the Jews in 1420.

In 1204, the first documented synagogue in Austria was constructed. In addition, Jews went through a period of religious freedom and relative prosperity; a group of families headed by notable rabbis settled in Vienna—these learned men were later referred to as "the wise men of Vienna". The group established a beit midrash that was considered to be the most prominent school of Talmudic studies in Europe at the time.

The insularity and assumed prosperity of the Jewish community caused increased tensions and jealousy from the Christian population along with hostility from the Catholic Church. In 1282, when the area became controlled by the Catholic House of Habsburg, Austrian prominence decreased as far as being a religious center for Jewish scholarly endeavors due to the highly antisemitic atmosphere.

Due to being barred from owning real estate, farming, and practicing most trades and crafts, Jewish communities in Austria engaged mainly in commerce, particularly money lending. Some Jewish business enterprises focused on civic finance, private interest-free loans, and government accounting work enforcing tax collection and handling moneylending for Christian landowners.

The earliest evidence of Jewish officials tasked with the unpleasant role of collecting unpaid taxes appears in a document from 1320. During the same time, riots occurred scapegoating all Jews who resided in the area. The entire Jewish population was unfairly targeted by some angry non-Jewish neighbors and the animosity made daily life unbearable—the population continued to decline in the middle of the 14th century.

Duke Albert V's negative view of the Jews, combined with his pressing need for money, led to the Jewish persecutions of 1420–1421, which began with the Wiener Gesera (the Vienna Decree) on May 23, 1420. The wealthy Jews were tortured to extract their money, while the poor were expelled from Austria. Forced baptism was also imposed.

=== Deportation from Austria ===
In the middle of the 15th century, following the establishment of the anti-Catholic movement of Jan Hus in Bohemia, the condition of Jews worsened as a result of unfounded accusations that the movement was associated with the Jewish community.

In 1420, the status of the Jewish community hit a low point when a Jewish man from Upper Austria was falsely accused and charged with the crime of desecration of the sacramental bread.

During the Hussite Wars, Jews were suspected of collaborating with the Hussites, leading to Albert II to expel Austrian Jews and confiscate their property in what as known as the Vienna Gesera; Viennese Jews were murdered and expelled, and in some cases committed collective suicide. In March 1421 stake burnings took place as well.

In 1469, the deportation order was cancelled by Frederick III, who became known for his fairness and strong relationship by allowing Jews to live relatively free from scapegoating and hate crimes—he was even referred to at times as the "King of the Jews". He allowed Jews to return and settle in all the cities of Styria and Carinthia. Under his regime, Jews gained a short period of peace (1440-1493).

In 1496, Maximilian I ordered a decree which expelled all Jews from Styria. In 1509, he passed the "Imperial Confiscation Mandate", which foresaw the destruction of all Jewish books, apart from one exception, the Bible.

== The rise of religious fanaticism of the Society of Jesus ==
The period of relative peace did not last long. Ferdinand I, whose regime began in 1556, opposed the persecution of the Jews, but levied excessive taxes .In 1551, he ordered Jews to wear a mark of disgrace.

Between 1564 and 1619, during the reigns of Maximilian II, Rudolf II and Matthias, the fanaticism of the Jesuits prevailed and the condition of the Jews worsened even more. Jesuits influenced the government to impose a high tax on the Jewish population.

Later, Ferdinand II theoretically opposed the persecution of the Jews, as had his grandfather, and even permitted the construction of a synagogue. Nevertheless, huge taxes were imposed upon the Jewish population.He is the first emperor to employ court Jews, Jewish moneylenders who lent to or managed money for the upper classes. Ferdinand also ignored petitions from the Vienna City Council to expel the Jews.

The nadir of the Jewish community in Austria arrived during the reign of Leopold I, a period in which Jews were persecuted frequently and deported from many areas, including Vienna in 1670, though they gradually returned after several years.

Jews were also subject to different laws—one of which permitted only first-born children to marry—in order to stop the increase of the Jewish population. Although Leopold treated the Jewish population severely, he did have a Jewish economic advisor, Samson Wertheimer.

A Sabbatean movement, which was established in the same period, also reached the Jewish community in Austria, largely due to the difficult condition of the Jews there. Many followed in the footsteps of Sabbatai Zevi by immigrating to the land of Israel.

== Modern period ==
Jewish population of Vienna according to census and particular area
Year	Total pop.	Jews	%
1857	476,220	2,617	1.3
1869	607,510	40,277	6.6
1880	726,105	73,222	10.1
1890	817,300	99,444	12.1
1890*	1,341,190	118,495	8.8
1900	1,674,957	146,926	8.7
1910	2,031,420	175,294	8.6
1923	1,865,780	201,513	10.8
1934	1,935,881	176,034	9.1
1951	1,616,125	9,000	0.6
1961	1,627,566	8,354	0.5
1971	1,619,855	7,747	0.5
1981	1,531,346	6,527	0.4
1991	1,539,848	6,554	0.4
2001	1,550,123	6,988	0.5
*after expansion of Vienna

=== Change in the attitude towards the Jews ===
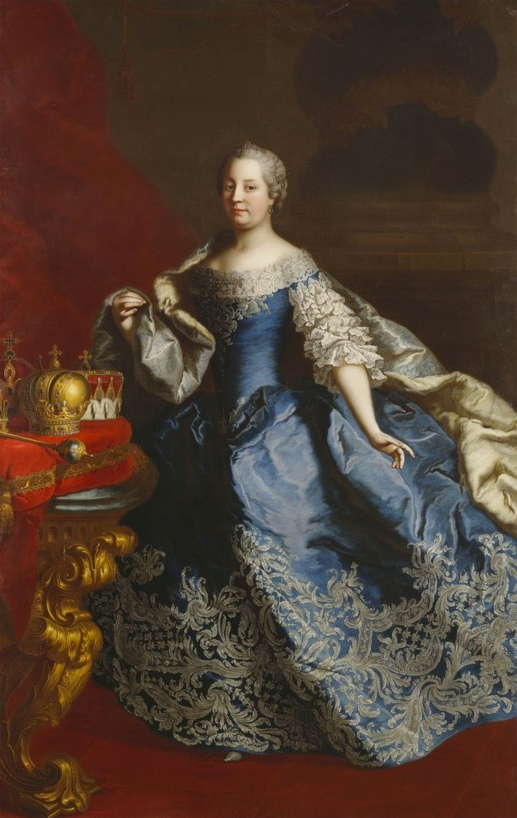
Maria Theresa of Austria

After the period of religious fanaticism towards the Jewish population of the region, a period of relative tolerance began which was less noticeable during the reign of Maria Theresa of Austria. It reached its peak during the reign of Franz Joseph I of Austria, who was very popular among the Jewish population.

Upon the partition of the Polish–Lithuanian Commonwealth in 1772, the Kingdom of Galicia and Lodomeria, or simply "Galicia", became the largest, most populous, and northernmost province of the Habsburg Empire.At the time, the region's Jewish population numbered 224,980 (9.6% of the total).

As a result of annexation, many Jews were added to the Austrian Empire and empress Maria Theresa quickly passed different laws aimed at regulating their rights and canceled Jewish autonomy to take auth

Although the empress was known for her hatred of Jews, several Jews did work for her at her court. The empress made it mandatory that Jews would go to the general elementary schools, and in addition, permitted them to join universities. Jewish schools did not exist yet during that time.

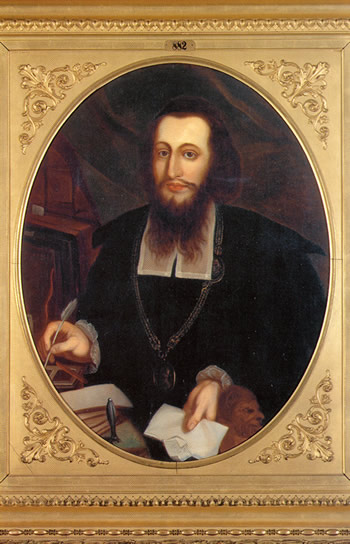
Samson Wertheimer

After Maria Theresa's death in 1780, her son Joseph II succeeded her and started working on the integration of Jews into Austrian society. The emperor determined that they would be obligated to enlist in the army, and established governmental schools for Jews.

The 1782 Edict of Tolerance canceled different limitations that had been placed upon Jews previously, such as the restriction to live only in predetermined locations and the limitation to certain professions.

They were now allowed to establish factories, hire Christian servants and study at higher education institutions, but all this only on the condition that Jews would be obligated to attend school, that they would use German only in the official documents instead of Hebrew or Yiddish, that dorsal tax would be forbidden, that the trials held within the community would be condensed, and that those who would not get an education would not be able to marry before the age of 25.

The emperor also declared that Jews would establish Jewish schools for their children, but they opposed that because he forbade them organizing within the community and establishing public institutions. In 1787, more than 104 government schools were established for the education of the Jews, and Naphtali Herz Homberg was appointed chief inspector. In 1789, Jews were conscripted into military service and required to adopt German family names.

In the aftermath of different resistances, also from the Jewish party, which opposed the many conditions held upon them, and also from the Christian party, which opposed many of the rights given to Jews, the decree was not fully implemented.

Upon his death in 1790, Joseph II was succeeded by his brother, Leopold II. After only two years of his reign, he died and was succeeded by his son Francis II, who continued working on the integration of Jews into the wider Austrian society, but he was more moderate than his uncle.

In 1812, a Jewish Sunday school opened in Vienna. During the same period of time, a number of limitations were placed on Jews, such as the obligation to study in Christian schools and to pray in German.

=== Prosperity ===
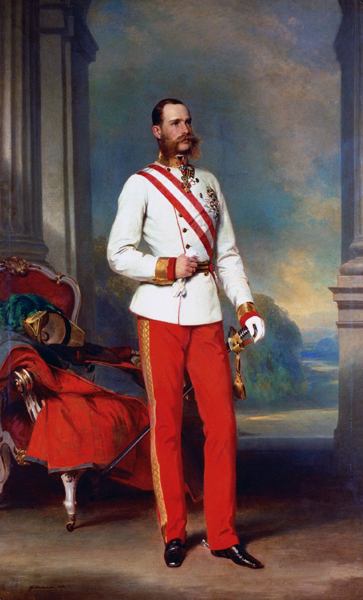
Franz Joseph I of Austria

Between 1848 and 1938, Jews in Austria enjoyed a period of prosperity beginning with the start of the reign of Franz Joseph I as the Emperor of the Austro-Hungarian Empire, and dissolved gradually after the death of the emperor to the annexation of Austria to Germany by the Nazis, a process that led to the start of the Holocaust in Austria.

Franz Joseph I granted Jews equal rights, saying "the civil rights and the country's policy is not contingent in the people's religion". The emperor was well liked by Jews, who, as a token of appreciation, wrote prayers and songs about him that were printed in Jewish prayer books.

Upon his death in 1790, Joseph II was succeeded by his brother, Leopold II. Leopold ruled for only two years; after his death, he was succeeded by his son, Francis II, who continued working on the integration of Jews into lower Austrian society. Francis, however, was more moderate than his uncle.

In 1849 the emperor canceled the prohibition against Jews organizing within the community, and in 1852 new regulations for the Jewish community were set. In 1867, Jews formally received full equal rights thanks to liberalization efforts.

In contrast to the medieval-European view of Jews as a separate, foreign nation, Austro-hungarian liberals defined 'Jewishness' as a religious identity and expected Jews to assimilate in other areas of life.

In Hungary, this meant assimilating to the Magyar identity, but the process was more complicated in the rest of the empire as "Austria" did not yet exist as a national identity, only a political identity.

The emperor established a fund aimed at financing the establishment of Jewish institutions and in addition, established the Talmudic school for rabbis in Budapest. During the 1890s several Jews were elected to the Austrian Reichsrat.

During the reign of Franz Joseph and after, Austria's Jewish population contributed greatly to Austrian culture despite their small percentage in the population. Contributions came from Jewish lawyers, journalists (among them Theodor Herzl), authors, playwrights, poets, doctors, bankers, businessmen, and artists. Vienna became a cultural Jewish center and became a center of education, culture and Zionism.

Theodor Herzl, the father of Zionism, studied at the University of Vienna and was the editor of the "feuilleton" of the Neue Freie Presse, a very influential newspaper at that time. Another Jew, Felix Salten, succeeded Herzl as the editor of the feuilleton.

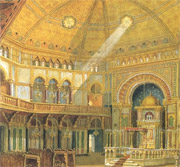
Inside the 1887 opened Türkischer Tempel in Leopoldstadt (painting)

Other notable influential Jews contributing greatly to Austrian culture included composers Gustav Mahler and Arnold Schoenberg; authors Stefan Zweig, Arthur Schnitzler, Karl Kraus, Elias Canetti, Joseph Roth, and Vicki Baum; doctors Sigmund Freud, Viktor Frankl, Wilhelm Stekel, and Alfred Adler; philosophers Martin Buber, and Karl Popper; and many others.

The prosperity period also affected the sports field; Jewish sports club Hakoah Vienna was established in 1909 and excelled in football, swimming, and athletics.

With Jewish prosperity and equality, several Jewish scholars converted to Christianity in a desire to assimilate into Austrian society. Among them were Karl Kraus and Otto Weininger.

During this period, Vienna elected an antisemitic mayor, Karl Lueger. Emperor Franz Joseph was opposed to the appointment, but after Lueger was elected three consecutive times, the emperor was compelled to accept his election according to the regulations. During his reign, Lueger removed Jews from positions in the city administration and forbade them from working in the factories located in Vienna until his death in 1910.

The intertwining of Jews and the attitude of the emperor towards them could also be seen in the general state of the empire. From the middle of the 19th century there started to be many pressures from the different nationalities living in the multinational House of Habsburg empire: the national minorities (such as the Hungarians, Czechs and Croatians) began demanding more and more collective rights; among German speakers, many started feeling more connected to Germany, which was strengthening.

Under these circumstances, the Jewish population was especially notable for their loyalty to the empire and their admiration of the emperor. The Austrian Jews of the World War I are sometimes described as having a "tripartite identity": politically Austrian, culturally German, ethnically Jewish.

Jewish loyalty to Austria and the emperor was particularly strong during WWI, given that the state's main enemy during the first two years of the war was Russia, known to be a highly dangerous place for its Jewish citizens. About 300,000 Jewish men served in the Austrian military.

Austria-Hungary was at the time the country with the second-largest Jewish population in the world, after the Russian Empire (which also included large areas of today's Poland and Ukraine). About 4.5% of its population was Jewish.

In 1910, 1,313,687 Jews lived in the Austrian half of the empire, most of these in the northeastern provinces of Galicia and Bukovina. In 1918, there were about 300,000 Jews in the new (much smaller) Austrian state, scattered in 33 different settlements. Most of these (about 200,000) lived in Vienna. At that time, Vienna had the third-largest urban population of Jews in Europe.

=== The First Republic and Austrofascism (1918–1934 / 1934–1938) ===
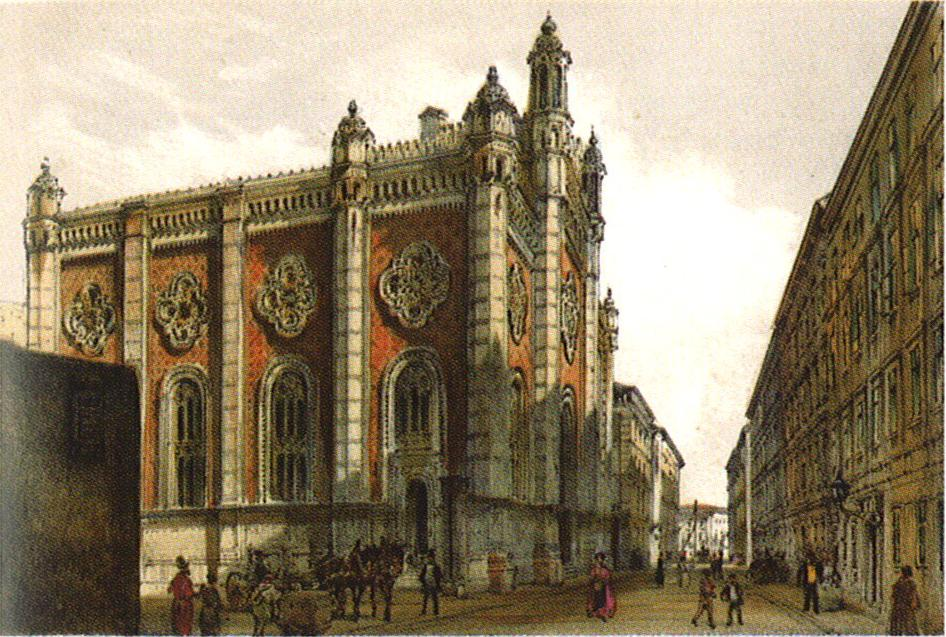
Leopoldstädter Tempel, one of the many synagogues in the neighborhood of Leopoldstadt, Vienna

Austria was strongly influenced by Jews during its First Republic (1919–34). Many of the leading heads of the Social Democratic Party of Austria and especially the leaders of the Austromarxism were assimilated Jews; for example, Victor Adler, Otto Bauer, Gustav Eckstein, Julius Deutsch, and Vienna school system reformer Hugo Breitner.

Due to the Social Democratic Party being the only party in Austria that accepted Jews as members and also in leading positions, several Jewish parties that were founded after 1918 in Vienna, where about 10% of the population was Jewish, had no chance of gaining bigger parts of the Jewish population.

Districts with high Jewish population rates, such as Leopoldstadt in Vienna, the only districts where Jews formed about half of the population, and the neighbouring districts Alsergrund and Brigittenau, where up to a third of the population was Jewish, had usually higher percentage rates of voters for the Social Democratic Party than classical "worker" districts.

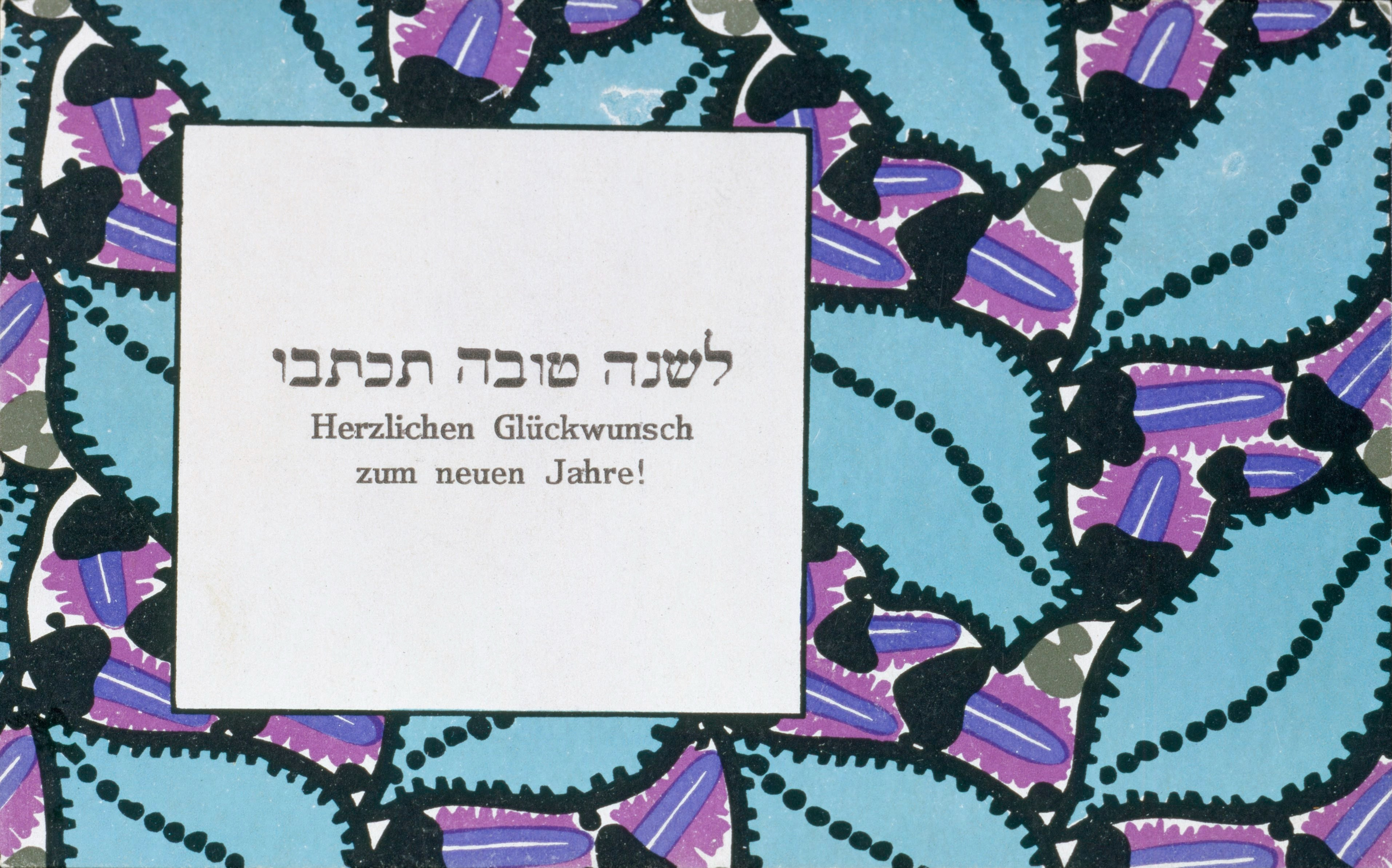
Rosh Hashanah greeting card by Wiener Werkstätte, 1910

The First Republic of Austria denied citizenship to former Habsburg monarchy Jews during the interwar period. Brain drain from Austria already began with the increase of antisemitism after the collapse of the Habsburg Empire.

At the University of Vienna, violent attacks by German National and National Socialist students against Jewish and socialist classmates increased since the 1920s, particularly at the Institute of Anatomy under Julius Tandler, or on the occasion of the abolishment of the anti-Semitic Gleispach student regulation 1930.

In 1921, there was a significant antisemitic mob parade in Vienna. Jews were blamed for the downfall of Austria-Hungary and the Central Powers during World War I, similarly to the German "stab-in-the-back" myth.

During the 1920s, Jewish cultural creators flourished, including bestselling novels written by Jews and a revival of Yiddish theater enjoyed by both Jews and non-Jews alike.

In May 1923, Vienna hosted the First World Congress of Jewish Women in the presence of President Michael Hainisch, calling in particular for support for the relocation of Jewish refugees in Palestine. The cultural contribution of Jews reached its peak. Many famous writers, film and theatre directors (e.g., Max Reinhardt, Fritz Lang, Richard Oswald, Fred Zinnemann, Otto Preminger), actors (e.g., Peter Lorre, Paul Muni), producers (e.g., Jacob Fleck, Oscar Pilzer, Arnold Pressburger), architects and set designers (e.g., Artur Berger, Harry Horner, Oskar Strnad, Ernst Deutsch-Dryden), comedians (Kabarett artists (e.g., Heinrich Eisenbach, Fritz Grünbaum, Karl Farkas, Georg Kreisler, Hermann Leopoldi, Armin Berg), musicians, and composers (e.g., Fritz Kreisler, Hans J. Salter, Erich Wolfgang Korngold, Max Steiner, Kurt Adler) were Jewish Austrians.

In 1933, many Austrian Jews who had worked and lived in Germany for years returned to Austria, including many who fled Nazi restrictions on Jews working in the film industry.

In 1934, the Austrian Civil War broke out. The new Fatherland Front and the Federal State of Austria were fascist. They arrested the leaders of the Social Democratic Party and caused others to flee. But, except for Jews strongly engaged in the Social Democratic Party, the new Fatherland Front regime, which thought itself as pro-Austrian and anti-national socialism, brought no worsening for the Jewish population.

The census of 1934 counted 191,481 Jews in Austria, with 176,034 living in Vienna and most of the rest in Lower Austria (7,716) and Burgenland (3,632), where notable Jewish communities also existed. Of the other Bundesländer, only Styria (2,195) also counted more than 1,000 Jews. The United States Holocaust Memorial Museum estimates 250,000 Jews in Austria in 1933.

In 1936, the previously strong Austrian film industry, which had developed its own "emigrant-film"-movement, had to accept the German restrictions forbidding Jews from working in the film industry. Emigration among film artists then rose sharply with Los Angeles becoming the major destination.

The main emigration wave started in March 1938, with Anschluss, to November 1938, when nearly all synagogues in Austria were destroyed (more than 100, about 30 to 40 of which were built as dedicated synagogues, 25 of them in Vienna).

=== Anschluss ===
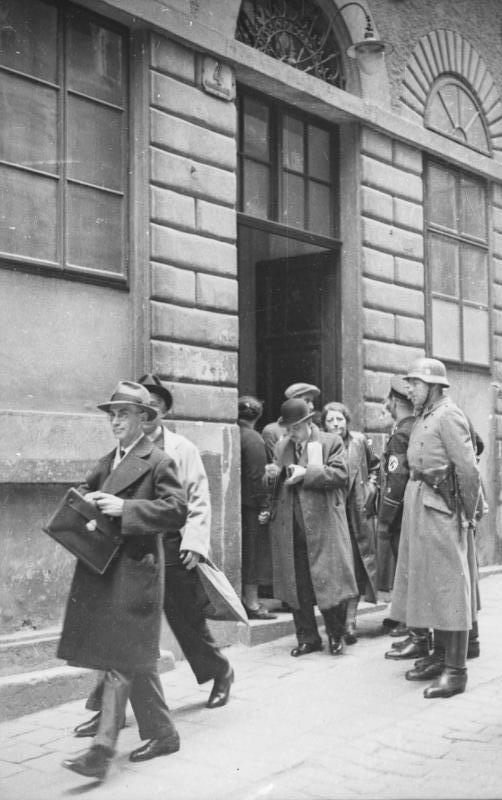
"Razzia" (raid) after the annexation of Austria at the headquarters of the Israelitische Kultusgemeinde in Vienna, March 1938

The prosperity ended abruptly on 13 March 1938 with the annexation of Austria by Nazi Germany (the "Anschluss"). The Jewish population in Austria at the time of annexation was about 192,000; and estimated 117,000 Jews fled Austria between 1938 and 1940.

The German racial Nuremberg Laws were immediately applied to Austria so that people with one Jewish grandparent were deemed to be Jewish, even if they or their parents had converted to another faith so that 201,000 to 214,000 people were caught by these anti-Jewish laws.

The Nazis entered Austria without any major resistance and were accepted approvingly by many Austrians; in 1938, 99.7 percent of Austrians voted to join with Germany. Immediately after Anschluss, the Nazis started instituting anti-Jewish measures throughout the country.

Jews were expelled from all cultural, economic, and social life in Austria. Jewish businesses were 'aryanised' and either sold for a fraction of their value or seized outright. Jewish citizens were humiliated as they were commanded to perform different menial tasks, without any consideration of age, social position, or sex.

On November 9, "the Night of Broken Glass" (Kristallnacht) was carried out in Germany and Austria. Synagogues all over Austria were looted and burned by the Hitler Youth and the SA. Jewish shops were vandalised and looted and some Jewish homes were destroyed. In Vienna, all synagogues except one were destroyed. During that night, at least 27 Jews were murdered in Austria, while many others suffered beatings.

=== The Holocaust in Austria ===
After the Anschluss, all Jews were effectively forced to emigrate from Austria, but the process was made extremely difficult. The emigration center was in Vienna, and the people leaving were required to have numerous documents approving their departure from different departments. The Central Office for Jewish Emigration under Adolf Eichmann was responsible for handling emigration.

They were not allowed to take cash or stocks or valuable items like jewelry or gold, and most antiques or artworks were declared 'important to the state' and could not be exported, and were often simply seized; essentially only clothes and household items could be taken, so nearly everything of value was left behind.

To leave the country, a departure 'tax' had to be paid, which was a large percentage of their entire property. Emigrants hurried to collect only their most important personal belongings, pay the departure fees, and had to leave behind them everything else.

Departure was only possible with a visa to enter another country, which was hard to obtain, especially for the poor and elderly, so even the wealthy sometimes had to leave behind their parents or grandparents.

By the summer of 1939, 110,000 Jews had departed the country. The last Jews left legally in 1941. Almost all Jews who remained after this time were murdered in the Holocaust, estimated to be 65,000 people.

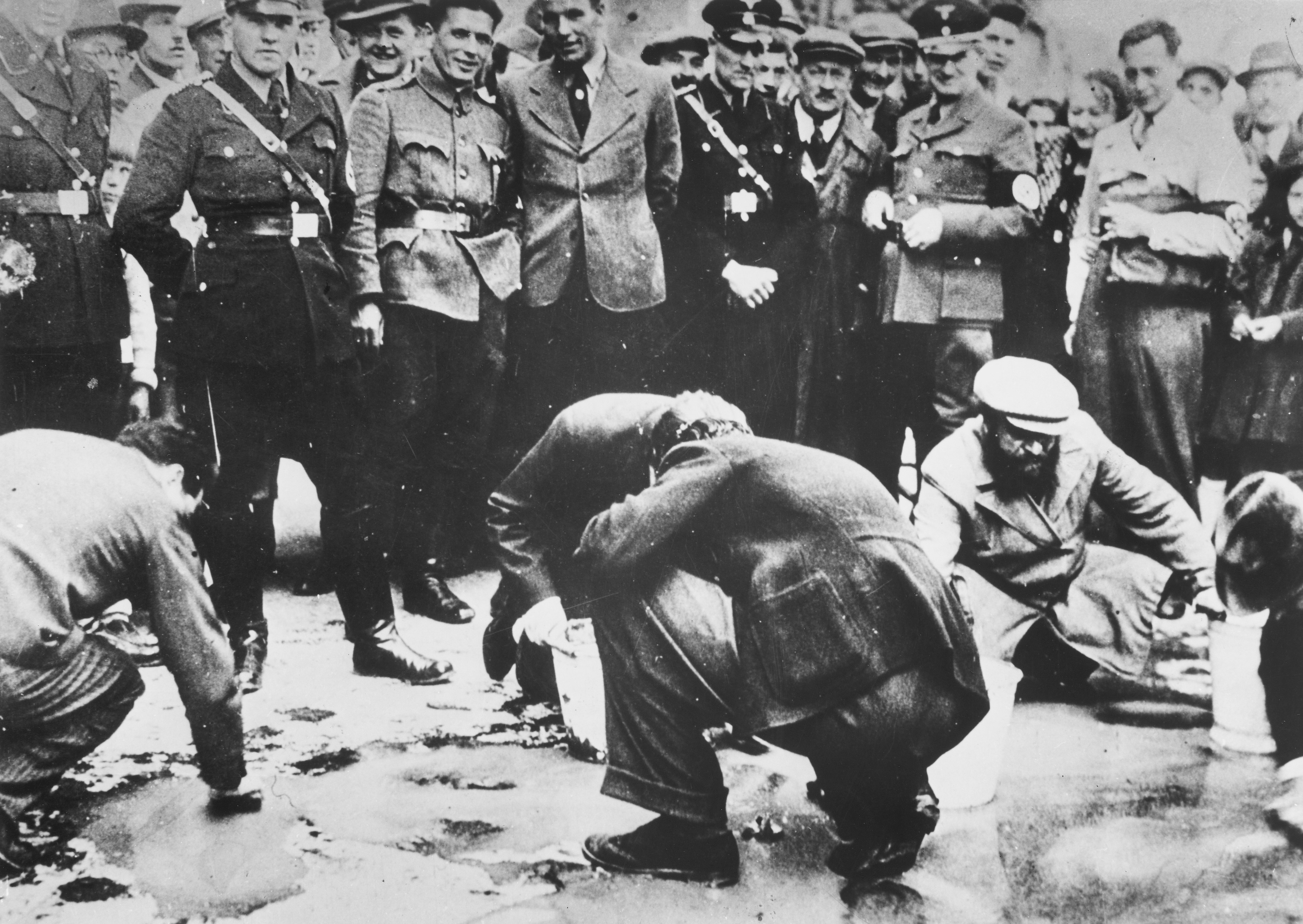
Immediately after the Anschluss the Nazis forced Austrian Jews to clean pro-independent Austria slogans off the pavements.

Some foreign officials assisted by issuing far more visas than they were officially allowed to. Chinese consul to Austria Ho Feng-Shan risked his own life and his career to rapidly approve of the visa applications of thousands of Jews seeking to escape the Nazis.

Among them were possibly the Austrian filmmakers Jacob and Luise Fleck, who got one of the last visas for China in 1940 and then produced films with Chinese filmmakers in Shanghai. Ho's actions were recognized posthumously when he was awarded the title Righteous among the Nations by the Israeli organization Yad Vashem in 2001.

==== Geertruida Wijsmuller ====
In December 1938, the Dutch representative of a committee for aid to Jews, Geertruida Wijsmuller-Meijer, went to Vienna after being requested to do so by British-Jewish professor Norman Bentwich, who on behalf of the British government sought help to fulfill the quota of 10,000 temporary Jewish refugee children from Nazi-Germany and Nazi-Austria.

Wijsmuller went to Vienna but was arrested for criticizing the Nazi Winterhilfe collection. She managed to talk her way out and the next day headed straight to the then office of Adolf Eichmann, the then relatively unknown head of the Central for Jewish Emigration Zentralstelle für Jüdische Auswanderung.

At first, he refused to see her, but then let her in for five minutes and disapprovingly told her she could take 600 Jewish children if she managed to get them out within one week, which she managed to do. She continued organising the transport of children from Germany and Austria until the outbreak of World War II on September 1, 1939, when European borders were closed.

The exact number of Austrian children that fled through Wijsmuller's organisation is not exactly known but according to her biographer runs up to 10,000. The last transport—now known as Kindertransport—took place on May 14, 1940, three days after the Netherlands were invaded by the Nazis, on the last ship leaving Dutch waters, the SS Bodegraven, on which she managed to place 74 German and Austrian Jewish children.

She decided to remain in Holland herself, although she had had the chance of joining the group of children. All of the children she rescued survived the war.

Wijsmuller was awarded the title 'Righteous Among the Peoples' by Yad Vashem. Early in 2020, a statue was made in her honor in her birth town of Alkmaar, but the unveiling was postponed due to the coronavirus pandemic.

=== Annihilation ===
In 1939 the Nazis initiated the annihilation of the Jewish population. The most notable persons of the community, about 6,000, were sent to the Dachau and Buchenwald concentration camps. The main concentration camp in Austria was the Mauthausen Concentration Camp, which was located next to the city of Linz. Many other Jews were sent to the concentration camp of Theresienstadt and the Łódź ghetto in Poland and from there they were transported to the Auschwitz concentration camp.

In the summer of 1939 hundreds of factories and Jewish stores were shut down by the government. In October 1941 Jews were forbidden to exit the boundaries of Austria. The total number of Jews who managed to exit Austria is about 28,000. Some of the Vienna Jews were sent to the transit camp at Nisko in Nazi-occupied Poland.

At the end of the winter of 1941, an additional 4,500 Jews were sent from Vienna to different concentration and extermination camps in Nazi-occupied Poland (mainly Izbica Kujawska and to ghettos in the Lublin area). In June 1942, a transport went directly from Vienna to Sobibor extermination camp, which had around one thousand Jews.

In the fall of 1942, the Nazis sent more Jews to the ghettos in the cities they occupied in the Soviet Union: Riga, Kaunas, Vilnius and Minsk. Those Jews were murdered by the Lithuanian, Latvian and Bielorussian collaborators under the supervision of German soldiers, mainly by being shot in forests and buried in mass graves.

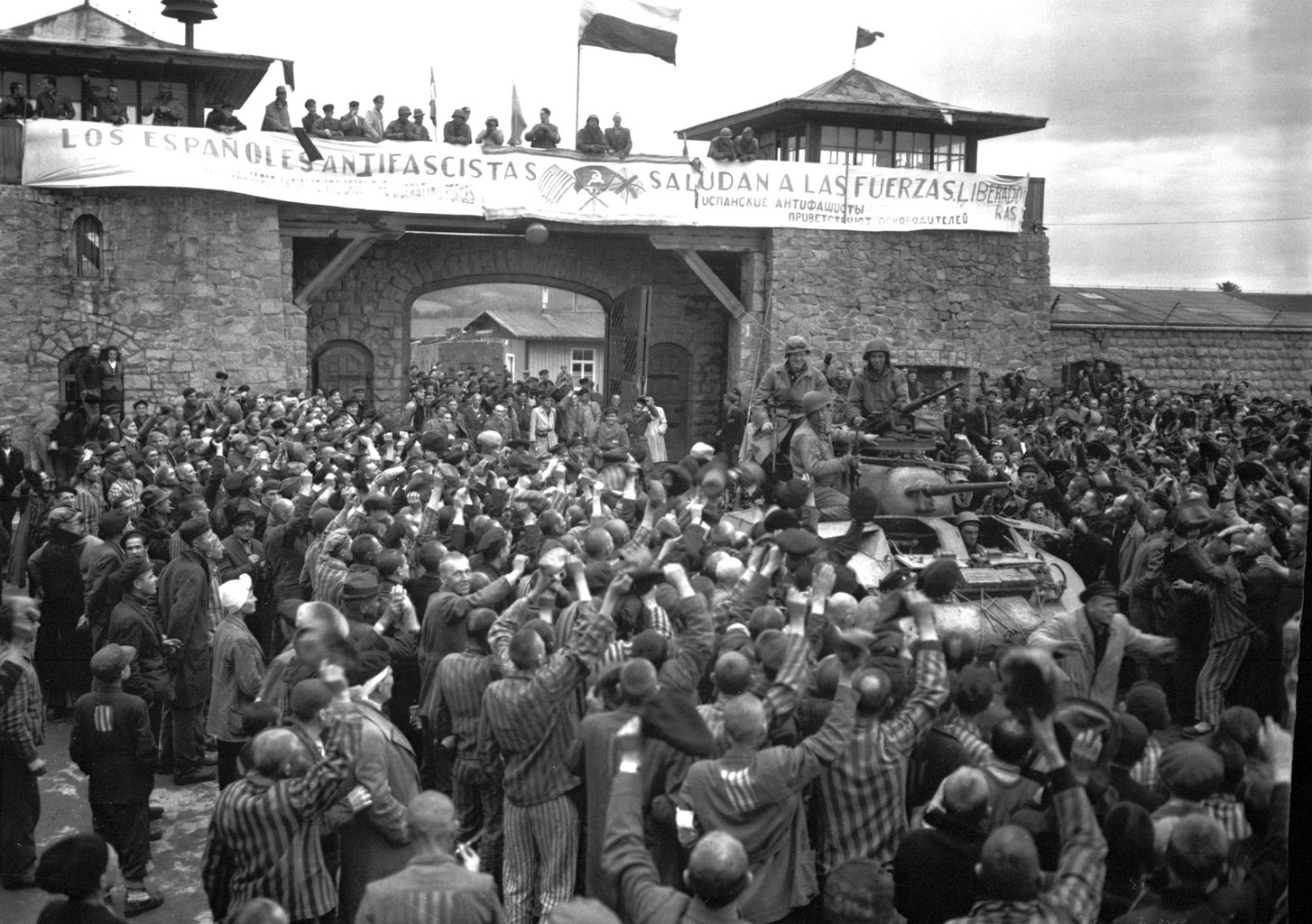
Liberation of the Mauthausen concentration camp by the American forces.

By October 1942 Austria had only about 2,000 to 5,000 Jews left. About 1,900 of these were sent out of the country during the next two years, and the rest remained in hiding. The total number of the Austrian Jewish population murdered during the Holocaust is about 65,500 people, 62,000 of them known by name.

The remaining Jewish population of Austria, excluding up to 5,000 who managed to survive in Austria, emigrated—about 135,000 people of Jewish religion or Jewish ancestry, compared to the numbers from 1938. But thousands of Austrian Jews had already emigrated before 1938.

=== After World War II ===
After the Holocaust, European Jewish survivors were concentrated in Allied DP camps in Austria. Holocaust survivors who had nowhere to return to after the war remained in the DP camps, and were helped by groups of volunteers who came from Palestine.

Until 1955, about 250,000 to 300,000 displaced persons lived in Austria. About 3,000 of them stayed in Austria and formed the new Jewish community. Many of the Jews in the DP camps throughout Europe eventually immigrated to Israel. Many others returned to Germany and Austria.

In October 2000, the Judenplatz Holocaust Memorial was built in Vienna in memory of the Austrian Jews murdered during the Holocaust.

One of the notable prisoners of the Mauthausen concentration camp was Simon Wiesenthal, who after his release worked together with the United States army to locate Nazi war criminals.

During the Hungarian Revolution of 1956, about 200,000 Hungarians fled through Austria to the west, among them 17,000 Jews. Seventy-thousand Hungarians stayed in Austria, a number of Jews among them. One of the best-known of them is the political scientist and publicist Paul Lendvai.

Details of the property seized under the Nazis in Vienna from Austrian Jews such as Samuel Schallinger who co-owned the Imperial and the Bristol hotels, and the names of those who took them and never gave them back, are detailed in the book Unser Wien (Our Vienna) by Stephan Templ, and Tina Walzer.

== Contemporary situation ==
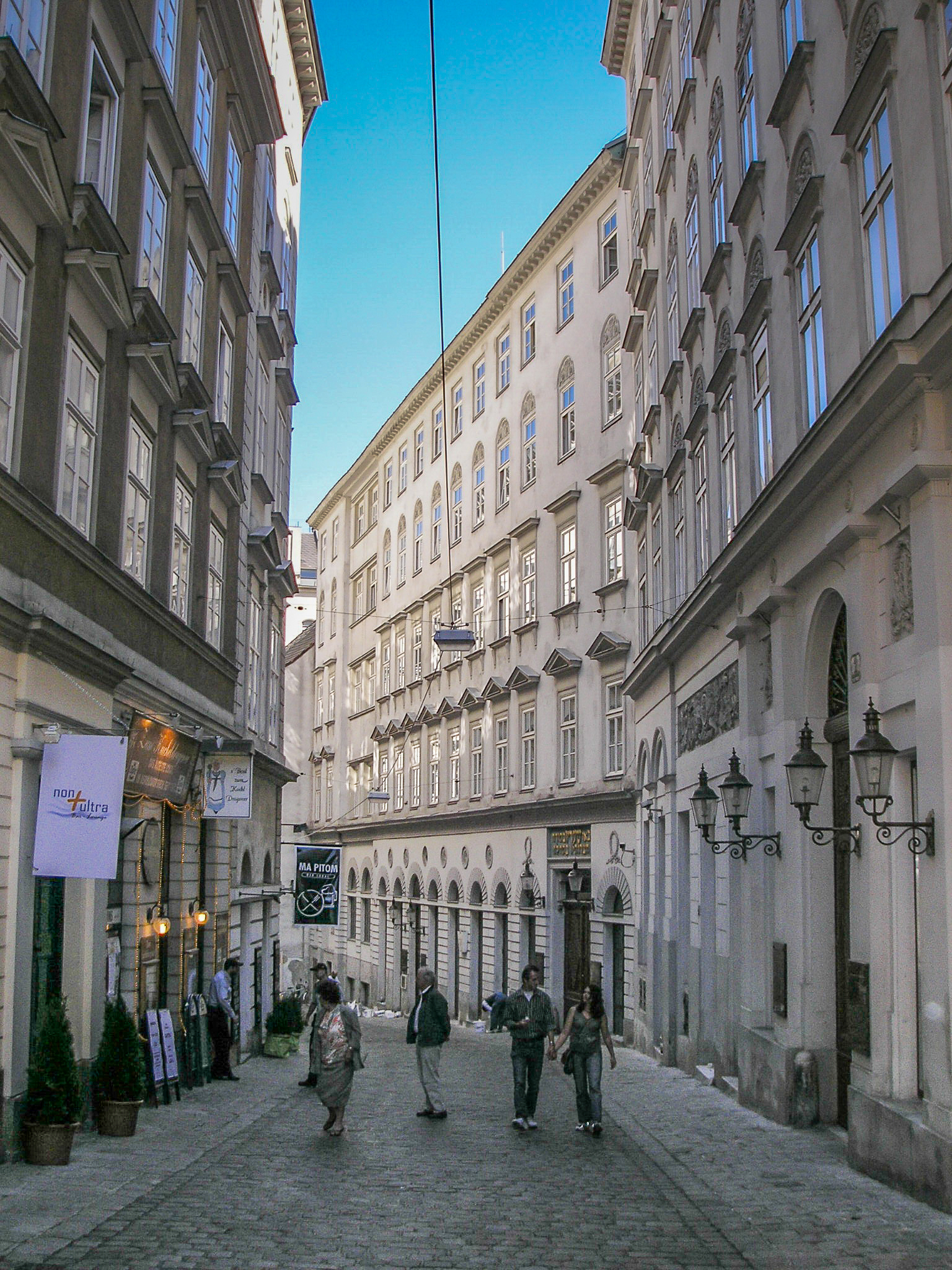
The Stadttempel in Vienna—the main building of the Jewish community, which houses the central synagogue

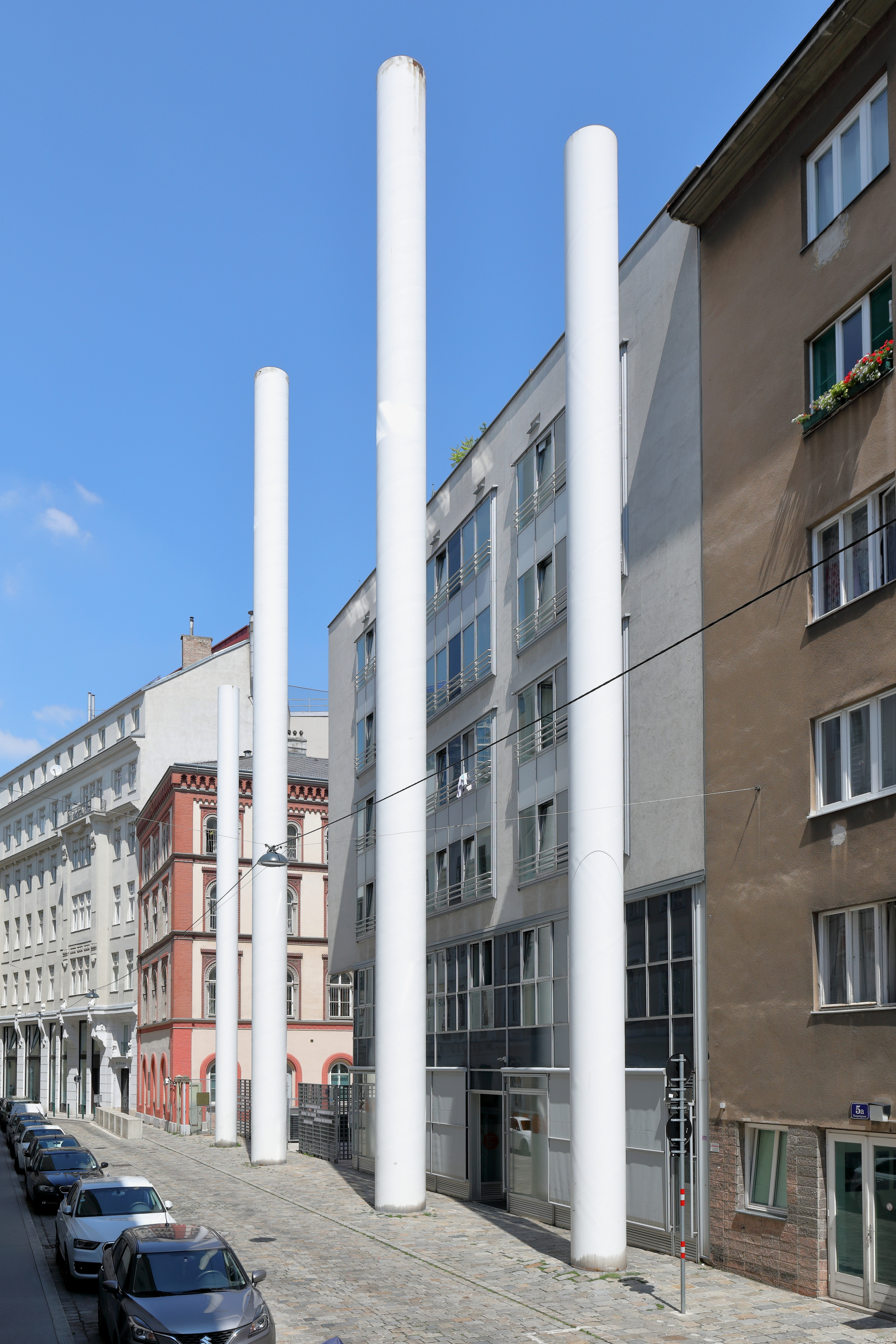
Monument on the place of the destroyed Leopoldstädter Tempel, showing the former size of this synagogue.

Since the Holocaust, the Jewish community in Austria has rebuilt itself, although it is much smaller. In the 1950s a wave of immigration from the Soviet Union brought Russian Jews to Austria.

Since the fall of the Iron Curtain, there has been a renewed influx of Jewish people from the former Soviet Union. The current Austrian Jewish population is around 12,000–15,000 — most living in Vienna, Graz and Salzburg. About 800 are Holocaust survivors who lived in Austria before 1938 and about 1,500 are immigrants from countries once a part of the Soviet Union.

The biggest Jewish presence in Austria today is in Vienna, where there are synagogues, a Jewish retirement home, the Jewish Museum (founded in 1993), and other community institutions. Austrian Jews belong to many different denominations, from Haredi to Reform Jews.

The Jewish community also has many activities arranged by the Chabad movement, which manages kindergartens, schools, a community center, and even a university. There are also active branches of the Bnei Akiva and Hashomer Hatzair youth movements.

Today, the biggest minority among the Jewish community in Vienna are immigrants from Georgia, followed by those from Bukhara, each with separate synagogues and a large community center called "The Spanish Center".

There were very few Jews in Austria in the early post-war years; however, some of them became very prominent in Austrian society. These include Bruno Kreisky, who was the Chancellor of Austria between 1970 and 1983, the artist and architect Friedensreich Hundertwasser and Jewish politicians such as Elisabeth Pittermann, a member of the Parliament of Austria from the Social Democratic Party of Austria and Peter Sichrovsky, who was formerly a member of the Freedom Party of Austria and a representative in the European Parliament.

In July 1991, Chancellor Franz Vranitzky acknowledged the Austrian role in the crimes of the Third Reich during World War II. In 1993, the Austrian government reconstructed the Jewish synagogue in Innsbruck, which was destroyed during Kristallnacht, and in 1994 they reconstructed the Jewish library in Vienna, which was then reopened.

Government programs were started in the 90's aimed at providing social welfare to Austrian victims of the Holocaust such as a compensation fund set up in 1995 and an art restitution law passed in 1998.

Further actions in the 2000s and 2010s saw the Austrian government act to restore Jewish cemeteries, provide access to archival documents, and extend social welfare to Austrian Holocaust survivors living outside of Austria.

The Austrian government was sued for the Austrian involvement in the Holocaust and required to compensate its Jewish survivors. Initially, the government postponed the compensation matters, until the United States started putting on pressure. In 1998 the Austrian government introduced the Art Restitution Act, which re-examined the question of art stolen by the Nazis. (See Portrait of Adele Bloch-Bauer I for an example of reluctance in compensating victims.)

In November 2005, the Austrian government sent out compensation letters to the 19,300 Austrian Holocaust survivors still living. The total amount that Austria paid in compensation was over $2 million, which was paid to individual Holocaust survivors themselves, to the owners of damaged businesses, stolen bank accounts, etc. In addition, the Austrian government transferred $40 million to the Austria Jewish fund.

Neo-Nazism and antisemitism have not vanished entirely from public life in Austria. In the 1990s many threat letters were sent to politicians and reporters, and some Austrian public figures have occasionally shown sympathy toward Nazism.

Kurt Waldheim was appointed as Austrian president in 1986 despite having served as an officer in the Wehrmacht Heer during the Second World War. He remained president of Austria until 1992. During his term he was considered a persona non grata in many countries. From 1989 to 1991 and 1999–2008, Jörg Haider, who made multiple anti-Semitic statements and was often accused of being a Nazi sympathizer, served as Governor of Carinthia.

Latent antisemitism is an issue in several rural areas of the country. Some issues in the holiday resort Serfaus gained special attention in 2010, where people thought to be Orthodox Jews were barred from making hotel bookings. Hostility by some inhabitants of the village towards those accommodating Jews was reported. Several hotels and apartments in the town confirmed that Jews were banned from the premises. Those who book rooms are subjected to racial profiling, and rooms are denied to those who are identified as possible Orthodox Jews.

In August 2020, an Arab immigrant from Syria was arrested in Graz for attacks on Jews, and defacing a synagogue with "Free Palestine" graffiti. He was also a suspect in an attacks on a Catholic church and on LGBT people. These attacks were characterized by officials as relating to radical Islamist anti-Semitism.

In September 2019, Austria voted to amend its citizenship law to allow for direct descendants of victims of National Socialism to regain Austrian citizenship. Previously, only victims and their children were allowed to regain Austrian citizenship. This amendment came into effect on September 1, 2020, and by early 2021 around 950 applicants had already been approved.

== Notable people ==
- Kurt Adler, Chorus Master and Conductor Metropolitan Opera New York
- Peter Altenberg, writer and poet
- John Banner, actor, well known for the sergeant Schultz character.
- Otto Bauer, politician, founder of Austromarxism, Foreign Minister of Austria
- Ignaz Brüll, composer and pianist
- Simon Deutsch, revolutionary
- Carl Djerassi, pharmaceutical chemist
- Hanns Eisler, composer
- Robert Fein, weightlifter, Olympic champion
- Viktor Frankl, psychiatrist who founded logotherapy
- Sigmund Freud, neurologist and the founder of psychoanalysis
- Fritz Grünbaum, cabaret artist
- Hans Haas, weightlifter, Olympic champion
- Elfriede Jelinek, actress, Nobel Prize laureate
- Eric Kandel, neuroscientist, Nobel Prize laureate
- Helen Singer Kaplan, sex therapist
- Melanie Klein, psychoanalyst
- Karl Koller, ophthalmologist
- Erich Wolfgang Korngold, composer and conductor
- Bruno Kreisky, politician, Austrian Chancellor
- Fritz Kreisler, violinist and composer
- Gustav Mahler, composer
- Ludwig von Mises, economist
- Reggie Nalder, actor
- Paul Neumann, swimmer and physician, Olympic champion
- Otto Neurath, philosopher of science, sociologist, and political economist
- Ellen Preis, fencer, Olympic champion
- Joseph Roth, journalist and novelist
- Harry Schein, actor
- Joseph Schildkraut, actor
- Arthur Schnitzler, author
- Arnold Schoenberg, composer
- Ludwig Wittgenstein, philosopher

== See also ==
- Austria–Israel relations
- List of Austrian Jews
- History of the Jews in Salzburg
- History of the Jews in Vienna
- History of the Jews in Germany
- History of the Jews in Switzerland
