= History of the Jews in Salzburg =

The history of the Jews in Salzburg, Austria goes back several millennia. Despite being a non-secular province with a Catholic Archbishop as the head of the state, Salzburg has a long record of Jewish history.

The first Jewish settlers arrived in the city when it was still under Roman rule and called Juvavum as a provincial town. After the decay of Juvavum and the foundation of a diocese in the city now called Salzburg, Bishop Arno of Salzburg (785-871) referred to a "medicum judaicum", or Jewish doctor.

Documents from the 12th century report the presence of a Jewish quarter and a street called "Judengasse" ("Jews alley"), an alley near the Cathedral that is still called by that name. There is record of a synagogue in the 13th century.

By 1492, Jews of Salzburg were publicly burned and Jewish settlers expelled from the city. This ban prevented the development of a Jewish community until well into the 19th century, by then Salzburg had become part of the Austrian-Hungarian Empire. Many central figures of Salzburg's intellectual and cultural life from the late 19th century until Austria's annexation by Nazi Germany in 1938 were Jewish or of Jewish origin, such as Stefan Zweig, Max Reinhardt, Theodor Herzl or Carl Zuckmayer.

After 1938, the synagogue and Jewish cemetery in Aigen were closed and many Jews either left Salzburg or were deported to concentration camps. Salzburg's Jewish community never fully recovered from those years. Today, it consists of about 100 members. The synagogue was re-opened after the war and is still the center of Jewish culture and worship in Salzburg. In 1953 a community was reestablished, and in 1968 the newly rebuilt synagogue was rededicated.

== See also ==
- History of the Jews in Austria
- History of the Jews in Vienna
- List of Austrian Jews
