= Simon Deutsch =

Bibliographer and revolutionary (1822–1877)

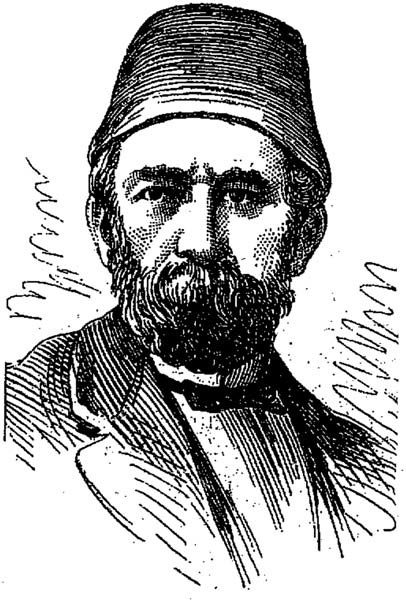
- Print of Simon Deutsch from Le Monde illustré, 10 June 1876.
- Born: c. 1822; Vienna, Austrian Empire
- Died: 24 March 1877 (aged 54); Constantinople, Ottoman Empire
- Burial place: Père Lachaise Cemetery

Simon Deutsch (Hebrew: שִׁמְעוֹן דויטש; c. 1822 – 24 March 1877) was an Austrian Jewish bibliographer, businessman, and revolutionary. He was an important member of the First International and a veteran of the Paris Commune.

== Biography ==
Simon Deutsch was born in Vienna in 1822 to parents from Nikolsburg, Moravia He studied at the Nikolsburg yeshiva, and later completed courses in philosophy and pedagogy in accordance with an 1842 law aimed at modernising the Moravian rabbinate.

As a young man he devoted himself to Hebrew studies in Vienna. He catalogued in collaboration with A. Kraft the Hebrew manuscripts in the possession of the Vienna Imperial Library, and published a medieval grammatical work in 1845. From 1844 to 1848, Deutsch was a contributor to Der Orient, a Leipzig-based German-Jewish weekly; and from 1846 to 1848, he wrote for Sonntagsblätter, a Viennese literary and cultural journal, founded and edited by Ludwig August von Frankl. Alongside writer Franz Gräffer, Deutsch co-published Jüdischer Plutarch in 1848, which contained biographies of prominent Jewish poets, painters, scientists, mathematicians, doctors, philosophers and educators. That same year, he became a member of the Deutsche Morgenländische Gesellschaft, one of the first scholarly associations to welcome Jews into its ranks.

In 1848 Deutsch sided with the revolution, escaping after its collapse to France. In Paris, through the assistance of Mme. Strauss, the friend of Börne, he entered upon a business career, in which he was successful. He assumed a prominent position in the Finance Department of the Paris Commune. After the fall of the Commune in May 1871, Deutsch was denounced to the government as a Communist. He was arrested and imprisoned at Versailles, and only the efforts of Austrian ambassador Richard von Metternich saved his life.

In 1875 Deutsch began publishing the Maḥberet of Menaḥem ben Saruq in fascicles with annotations and translations into Yiddish, based on a manuscript in the Imperial Library of Vienna, but the work was left incomplete. Towards the end of his life Deutsch was a supporter of the Young Turks movement. He died unexpectedly while in Constantinople on business, and was interred at the Père Lachaise Cemetery in Paris.
