= Lands of the Bohemian Crown (1867–1918) =

History of the Czech lands (Bohemia and Moravia)

Lands of the Bohemian Crown Länder der Böhmischen Krone (German) Země Koruny české (Czech) Corona regni Bohemiae (Latin)
- 1867–1918 (historical period)
- Flag Coat of arms (drawn by H. G. Ströhl)

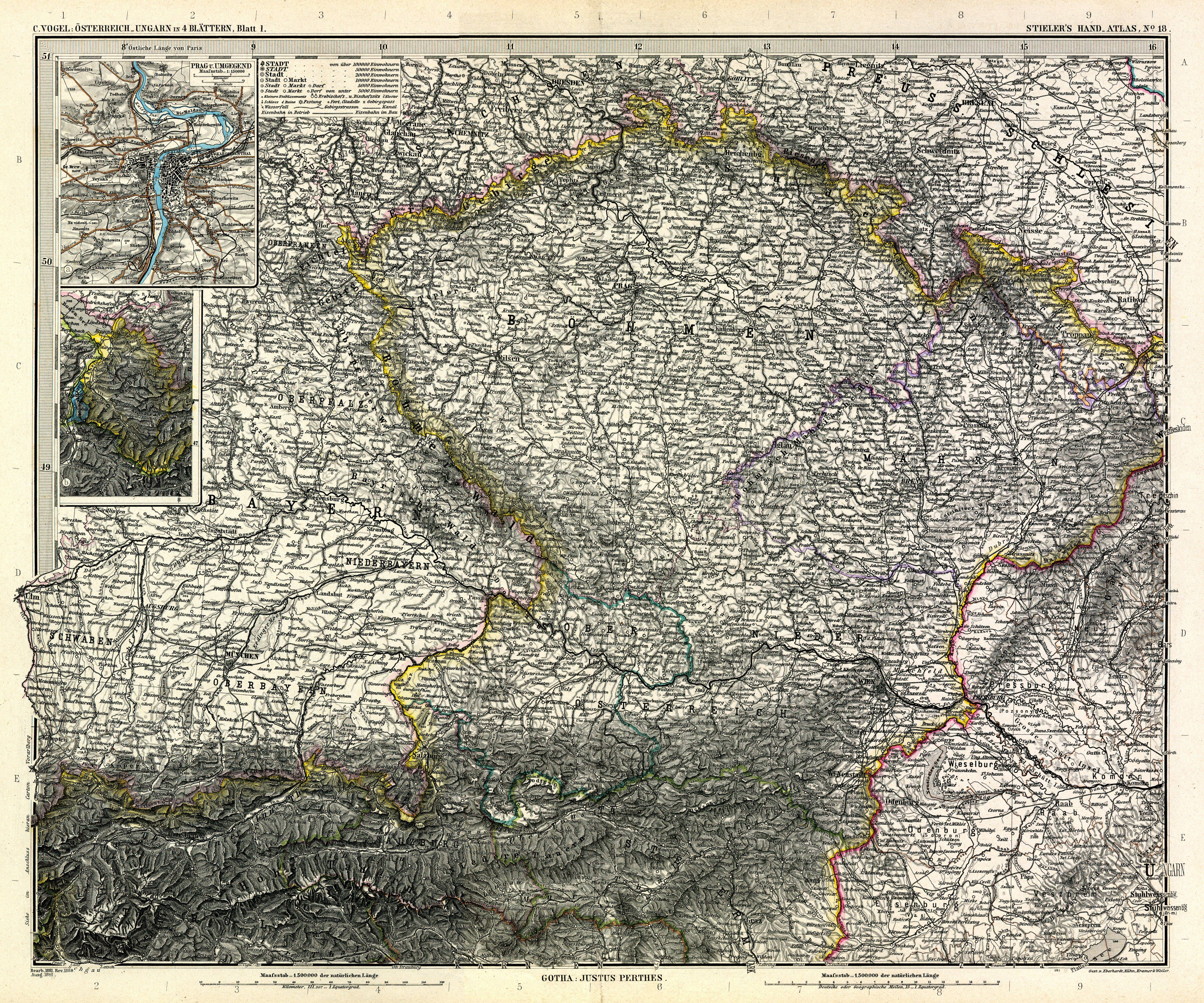
- The Lands of the Bohemian Crown at 1891
- Status: Crown lands of the Cisleithanian part of Austria-Hungary (1867–1918)
- Capital: Prague
- Common languages: Czech, German, Latin
- Religion: Roman Catholicism (official); Protestantism; Judaism (Jews)
- Government: Constitutional monarchy
- King
  - 1867–1916: Franz Joseph I
  - 1916–1918: Charles I
- History
  - Austro-Hungarian Compromise: 1867
  - Dissolution of the Austro-Hungarian Empire: 1918
Preceded by	Succeeded by
Lands of the Bohemian Crown (1648–1867)	First Czechoslovak Republic; Czechoslovak Provisional Government
- Today part of: Austria; Czech Republic; Germany; Poland

The Austro-Hungarian Compromise of 1867 established the Dual Monarchy of Austria-Hungary (also known as the Austro-Hungarian Empire).

== Overview of political dynamics 1867–1918 ==
The two parts of the empire were united by a common ruler, by a joint foreign policy, and, to some extent, by shared finances. Otherwise, Austria and Hungary were virtually independent states, each having its own parliament, government, administration, and judicial system.

Despite a series of crises, this dual system survived until 1918. It made permanent the dominant positions of the Hungarians in Hungary and of the Germans in the Austrian parts of the monarchy. Although both halves of the empire had parliamentary systems, in the Austrian half a series of franchise reforms, culminating in universal manhood suffrage in 1907, allowed the Czechs to play an increasingly active role in the political life of Austria. In the last decades before 1914 a succession of governments included a number of non-German ministers and even one Polish Minister-President, but Austria's Germans dominated political power at the imperial level until the end of the state.

At the local level, the various nationalities gained a great deal of control over provincial and municipal affairs after a series of reforms in local government in the 1860s and 1870s. The monarchy's inability or unwillingness to come to terms with its nationalities problems weakened the parliamentary system at a time of escalating international crises.

== Negotiations on Bohemian autonomy (1867–1877) ==
In Austria, German liberals held political power in parliament from 1867 to 1879. They were determined to maintain German dominance in the Austrian part of the empire. The Czech leaders, subsequently labeled Old Czechs, favored alliance with the conservative and largely Germanized Bohemian nobility and advocated the restoration of traditional Bohemian autonomy. In essence, they wanted a reconstituted Bohemian Kingdom (including Moravia and Silesia) with a constitutional arrangement similar to Hungary's. In 1871 the Old Czechs seemed to have succeeded, because the government agreed to the Fundamental Articles, which would have reinstated the historic rights of the Bohemian Kingdom. Violent protests from both German and Hungarian liberals ensued, however, and the articles were never adopted.

== History of Bohemia during the Old Czech era (1878–1891) ==
Objecting to an increase of Slavs in the empire, the German liberals opposed the 1878 Austro-Hungarian occupation of Bosnia and Herzegovina. The emperor, stung by the rejection of his foreign policy, dismissed the liberal government and turned to Count Eduard Taaffe's conservative "Iron Ring" cabinet (1879–1883). The Taaffe government took the Slavic element into greater account than the liberals had, and in turn was supported by the Old Czechs. Czech cooperation with Taaffe led to several important gains. A language decree promulgated in 1880 put Czech on an equal footing with German in the Bohemian "outer service" (the language government officials spoke to the public) and law. This law applied to all 216 judicial districts of Bohemia including 77 judicial districts without any significant presence of Czech-speakers. In 1882 Charles-Ferdinand University in Prague was divided into two separate institutions: one Czech and the other German. These concessions, however, seemed insufficient to a newly developing Czech commercial and industrial bourgeoisie. Intense conflict ensued as Czechs and Germans attempted to control local administration and education. German Bohemians held that in the closed German-speaking part of Bohemia, only German should be an official language, and objected to the language regulations as being motivated by the Czech "state rights" ideology. When some of the Old Czechs attempted to work out a compromise with the Bohemian Germans in 1890, they were denounced by a younger and more radical intelligentsia. The next year the Old Czechs were soundly defeated by the Young Czechs, ending a period of attempted compromises.

== History of Moravia (1867–1918) ==
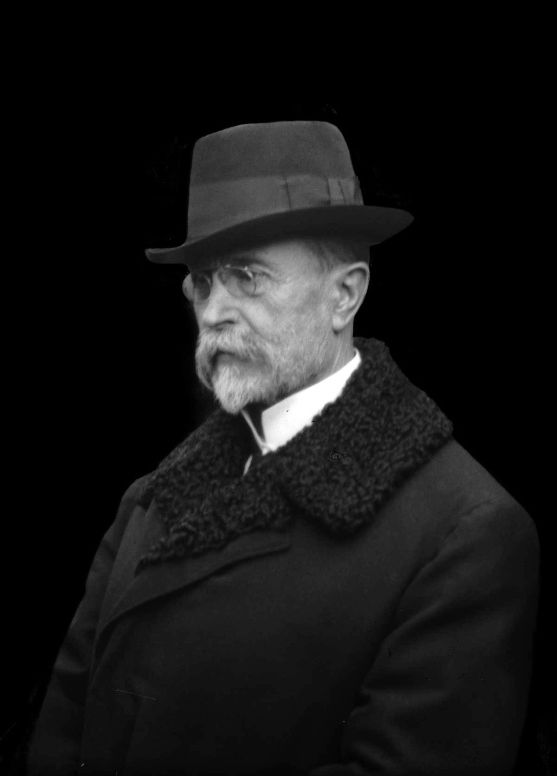
Tomáš Garrigue Masaryk, portrait by Josef Jindřich Šechtl, 1918

While relations between Czechs and Germans worsened in Bohemia, they remained relatively tranquil in Moravia. Although the separate administrative status of Moravia had been abolished in the 18th century, the area was reconstituted as a separate crown land in 1849. In Moravia, unlike in Bohemia, a compromise was reached by Karel Emanuel v. Zierotin, in 1905, between the Czech majority and the German minority. Although the German language retained a slight predominance, the preservation of Czech language and culture was legally guaranteed. The compromise seemed to work reasonably well until the end of Habsburg rule in 1918.

== Young Czech and Czech Progressive Party era (1891–1914) ==
During the final decade of the empire, obstructionism by both Czechs and Germans rendered parliamentary politics ineffectual, and governments rose and fell with great frequency. The importance of the Young Czech Party waned as Czech politics changed orientation. Political parties advocating democracy and socialism emerged. In 1900 Tomáš Masaryk, a university professor and former Young Czech deputy who was to become president of the Czechoslovak Republic, founded the Czech Progressive Party. Basing its struggle for national autonomy on the principle of popular sovereignty, the Czech Progressive Party supported parliamentary politics, advocated universal suffrage, and rejected radicalism.

At the turn of the century, the idea of a "Czechoslovak" entity began to be advocated by some Czech and Slovak leaders.

== World War I ==
In the first months of World War I, the response of the Czech soldiers and civilians to the war and mobilisation were highly enthusiastic; however later it turned into apathy. The cause of Czech self-government was greatly advanced by the war, during which, in 1917, the Manifesto of Czech writers, signed by over two hundred leading Czechs, was published. This favoured the concept of Czech autonomy.

== See also ==
- Kingdom of Bohemia
- Bohemia under Habsburg rule
- History of the Lands of the Bohemian Crown (1526–1648)
- History of the Lands of the Bohemian Crown (1648–1867)
- Czech lands under Habsburg rule
- History of Czechoslovakia
- Austroslavism
- Cisleithania
- Pan-Slavism
- Independent Social Democratic Party (Czech Lands)
- Austria-Hungary in World War I
