= Türkischer Tempel =

Former synagogue in Vienna, Austria

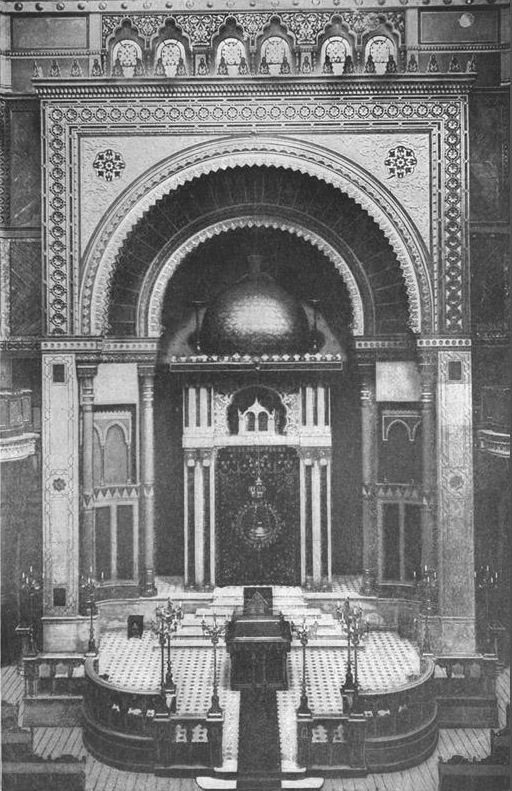
- Interior of the Türkischer Tempel, prior to its destruction

- Location of the former synagogue in Austria

Religion
- Affiliation: Judaism (former)
- Rite: Nusach Sefard
- Ecclesiastical or organisational status: Synagogue (1887–1938)
- Status: Destroyed

Location
- Location: Zirkusgasse 22, Vienna
- Country: Austria
- Coordinates: 48°12′57″N 16°23′02″E

Architecture
- Architect: Hugo von Wiedenfeld
- Type: Synagogue architecture
- Style: Islamic architecture
- Completed: 1887
- Destroyed: 9–10 November 1938 on Kristallnacht
- Dome: One

The Türkischer Tempel (English: Turkish Temple) was a Jewish synagogue, located at Zirkusgasse 22, in Vienna, Austria. It was built specifically for a community of Sephardi Jews, who originally came from Turkey.

The synagogue opened in 1887. It was designed in a Turkish, almost Islamic style, with a dome. The building was destroyed during the Kristallnacht in 1938.

== See also ==
- History of the Jews in Vienna
