= Lands of the Bohemian Crown (1348–1526) =

Central European states

Lands of the Bohemian Crown Země Koruny české (cs) Länder der Böhmischen Krone (de) Corona regni Bohemiae (la)
- 1348–1526 (the period from Luxembourgs to the first Habsburg on the throne)
- Top: Medieval royal banner of the King of Bohemia; Bottom: Late royal standard Simplified Coat of arms

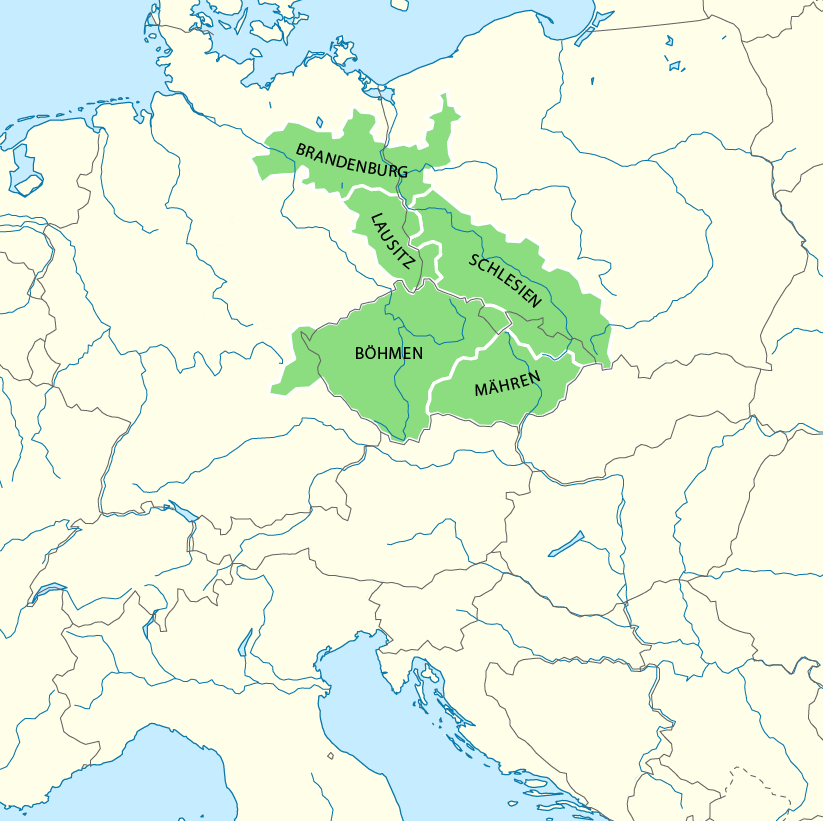
- The Lands of the Bohemian Crown with Margraviate of Brandenburg under Charles IV.
- Status: States of the Holy Roman Empire
- Capital: Prague
- Common languages: Czech, German, Latin
- Religion: Roman Catholicism; Hussitism; Judaism (Jews); Waldensianism; Neo-Adamitism
- Government: Feudal monarchy
- King
- History
  - Bohemian Crown lands established: 7 April 1348
  - Bohemian Crown lands became a part of the Habsburg monarchy: 16 December 1526
Preceded by
Czech lands under Luxembourgs
Upper Lusatia
Lower Lusatia
Upper Palatinate (Electoral Palatinate)
Succeeded by
Bohemian Crown under Ferdinand I
- Today part of: Czech Republic; Germany; Poland

King John's eldest son Charles IV was elected King of the Romans in 1346 and succeeded his father as King of Bohemia in the same year. Charles IV created the Bohemian Crown lands on the foundation of the original Czech lands ruled by the Přemyslid dynasty until 1306, together with the incorporated provinces in 1348. By linking the territories, the interconnection of crown lands thus no more belonged to a king or a dynasty but to the Bohemian monarchy itself, symbolically personalized by the Crown of Saint Wenceslas.

== History of the Lands of the Bohemian Crown (1348–1526) ==
=== Luxembourgs ===
The Luxembourg dynasty reached its high point, when Charles was crowned Holy Roman Emperor in 1355. By his Imperial authority he decreed that the united Bohemian lands should endure regardless of dynastic developments, even if the Luxembourgs should die out.

In 1367 he purchased Lower Lusatia from his stepson Margrave Otto V of Brandenburg and the Margraviate of Brandenburg. Beside their home County of Luxembourg itself, the dynasty held further non-contiguous Imperial fiefs in the Low Countries, such as: the Duchy of Brabant and Duchy of Limburg, acquired through marriage by Charles' younger half-brother Wenceslaus of Luxembourg in 1355; as well as the Margraviate of Brandenburg purchased in 1373. As both the King of Bohemia and the Margrave of Brandenburg had been designated Prince-electors in the Golden Bull of 1356, the Luxembourgs held two votes in the electoral college, securing the succession of Charles's son Wenceslaus in 1376.

With King Wenceslaus, the decline of the Luxembourg dynasty began. He himself was deposed as King of the Romans in 1400. The Duchies of Brabant, Limburg (in 1406), and even Luxembourg itself (in 1411) were ceded to the French House of Valois-Burgundy; while the Margraviate of Brandenburg passed to the House of Hohenzollern (in 1415).

=== During Hussite Wars ===
Nevertheless, the joint rule of the Bohemian Lands outlived the Hussite Wars and the extinction of the Luxembourg male line upon the death of Emperor Sigismund in 1437.

=== From the Jagiellons to the Habsburgs ===
Vladislas II of the Jagiellon dynasty, son of the Polish king Casimir IV, was designated King of Bohemia in 1471, while the crown lands of Moravia, Silesia, and the Lusatias were occupied by rivaling King Matthias Corvinus of Hungary. In 1479 both kings signed the Treaty of Olomouc, whereby the unity of the Bohemian crown lands was officially retained unchanged and the monarchs appointed each other as sole heir. Upon the death of King Matthias in 1490, Vladislas ruled the Bohemian crown lands and the Kingdom of Hungary in personal union.

When Vladislas' only son Louis was killed at the Battle of Mohács in 1526 ending the Jagiellon dynasty rule in Bohemia, a convention of Bohemian nobles elected his brother-in-law, the Habsburg archduke Ferdinand I of Austria, as the new king of the Bohemian crown lands. Together with the Archduchy of Austria "hereditary lands" and the Hungarian kingdom, they formed the Habsburg monarchy.

During the reign of King Ferdinand I from 1526, the lands of the Bohemian Crown became a constituent part of the Habsburg monarchy, which in the following centuries grew out of the Holy Roman Empire into a separate European power.

== See also ==
- Kingdom of Bohemia
- Lands of the Bohemian Crown (1526–1648)
