= Wolfgang Lazius =

Austrian humanist, cartographer and historian

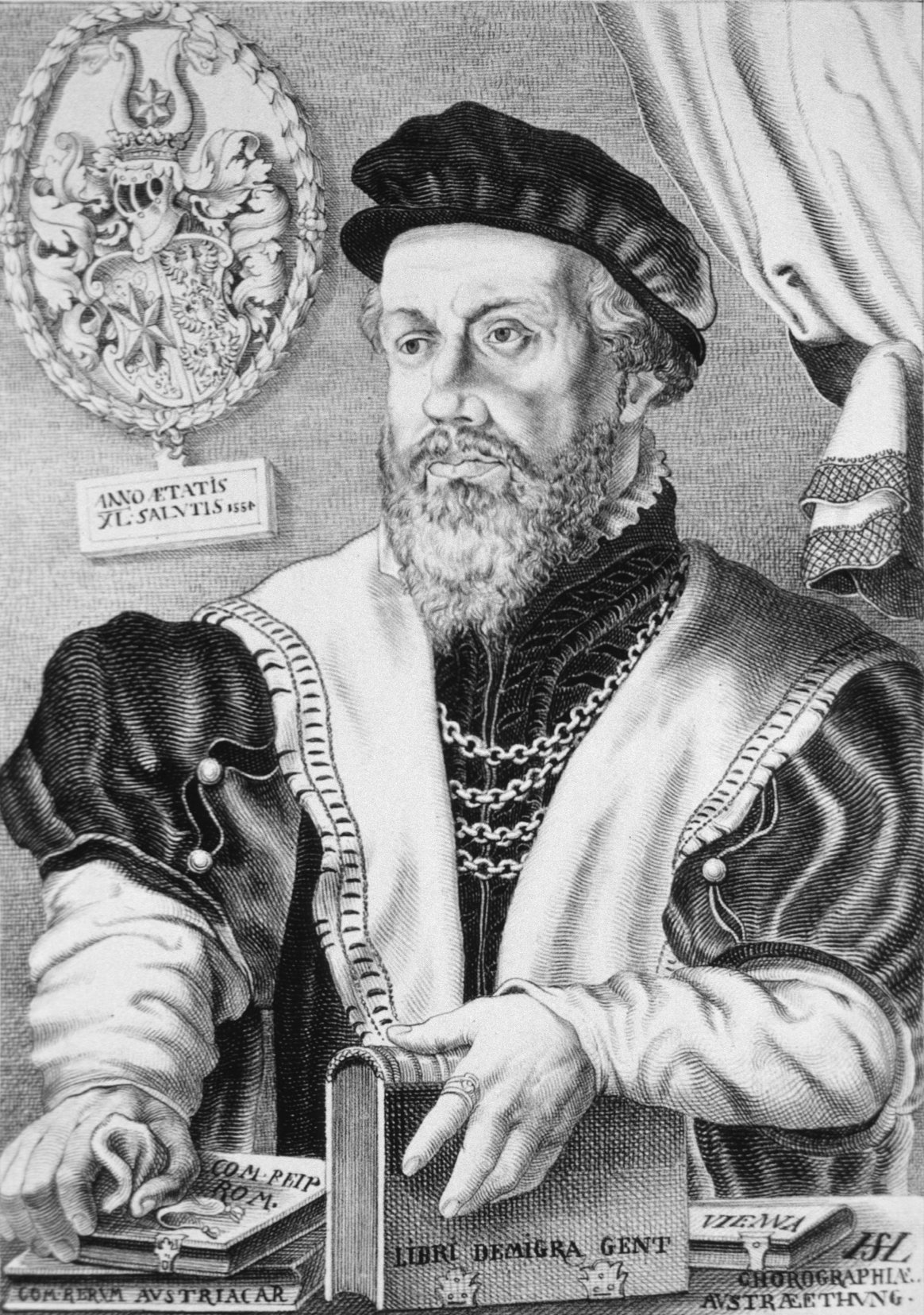
Wolfgang Lazius, Portrait by Hans Sebald Lautensack (1554)

Wolfgang Laz, better known by his Latinized name Wolfgang Lazius (October 31, 1514 – June 19, 1565), was an Austrian humanist who worked as a cartographer, historian, and physician.

Lazius was born in Vienna, and first studied medicine, becoming a professor in the medical faculty at the University of Vienna in 1541. He later became curator of the imperial collections of the Holy Roman Empire and official historian to Emperor Ferdinand I. In that capacity, he authored a number of historical works, in research for which he traveled widely, amassing (and sometimes stealing) documents from numerous monasteries and other libraries. He also produced maps of Austria, Bavaria, Hungary, and Greece, now considered important in the history of cartography. His Typi chorographici provinciarum Austriae (1561) bears some early elements of a historical atlas, though it serves more as a celebration of the Habsburg monarchy than as a true historical work.

It is thought that Giuseppe Arcimboldo's painting The Librarian is of Lazius.
