= Jurist (disambiguation) =

Jurist is a person with expert knowledge of law; someone who analyses and comments on law.

It may also refer to:

- JURIST, an online legal news service.
- The Jurist, a peer-reviewed academic journal.
- The Jurist, an Italian painting (1566).

== See also ==
- Faqīh, an Islamic jurist
