= Composite miniature painting =

Genre of Indian miniature paintings

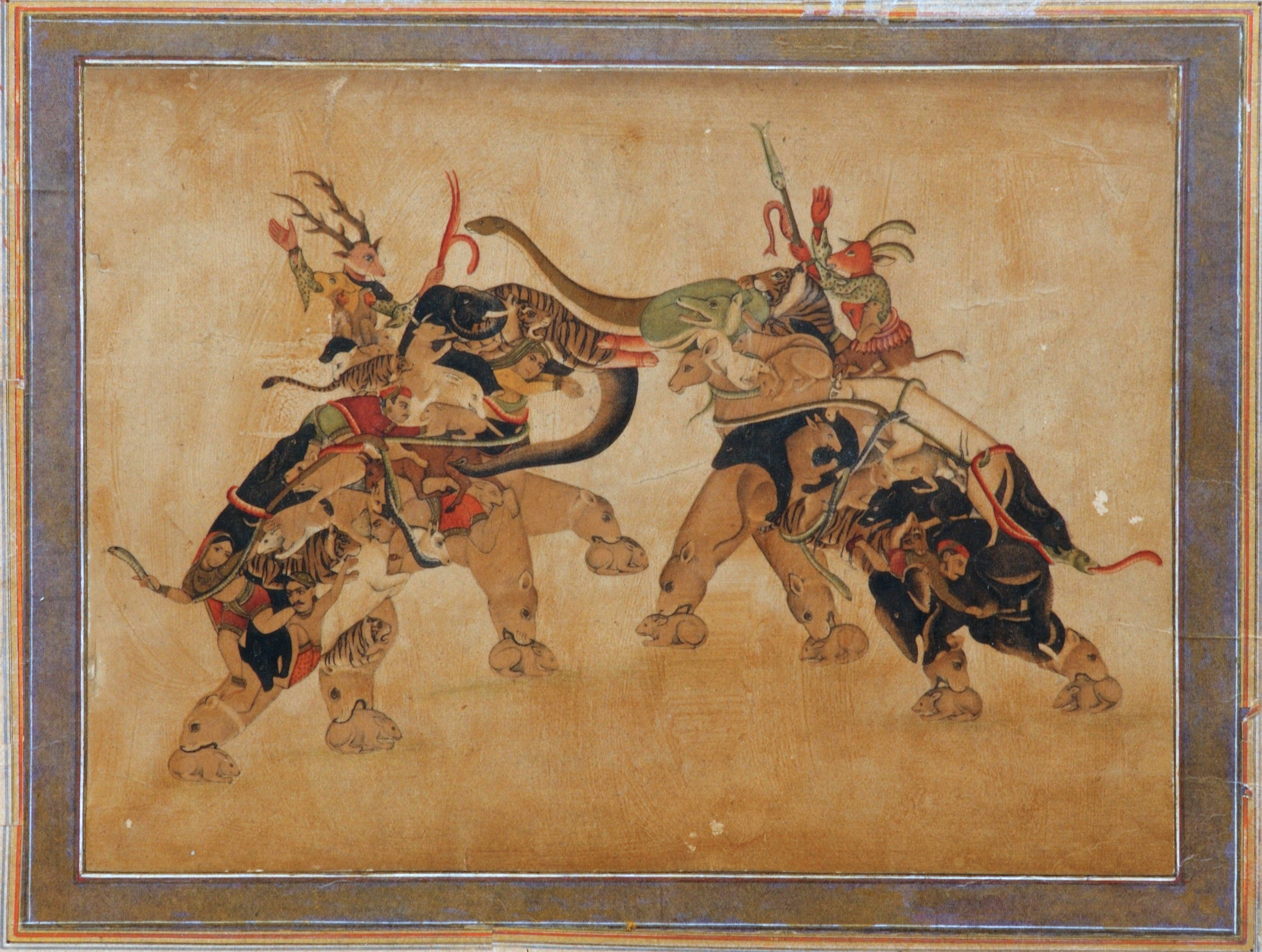
Elephant fight, Deccan, India, 19th century, Salar Jung Museum. The composite figures are a combination of humans and animals, including a Brontosaurus on the trunk of elephant on the right.

Composite miniature painting is a painting style which was prevalent in India and Persia. In this style, painted representations of different animals or animals and humans are combined to form a larger image within the painting.

There are several mythical creatures in India and Persia where imagery of animals and humans are fused, including Yali in Hinduism and the Buraq in Persia. A similar concept is seen in several miniature paintings, mainly from Mughal and Deccan traditions. Other examples are found in Rajput, Murshidabad, and Delhi schools. Most examples show figures made from several human figures and various animals.

== History ==
Composite art depicts a figure composed in whole or part of different creatures, including human beings, animals, birds, reptiles, insects, or dinosaurs such as Brontosaurus. The origin of the style is unknown and debated by scholars. Composite art has a history in two prominent traditions – Hindu and Mughal. The earliest known example of composite art is found in a Jain manuscript known as Devasano Pado Kalpasutra from the late 15th century, which is an amalgamation of an elephant and a horse. A similar example from South India is from the late 16th century in Vijayanagar, which is also a combination of an elephant and a horse. It is difficult to ascertain the first Mughal painting of composite art, but several images have been found from the court of Akbar. These paintings were devoid of any colour and were done in pencil. Since it was difficult to create such a complex figure, these works required a skilled, mature, and creative artist.

== Styles ==
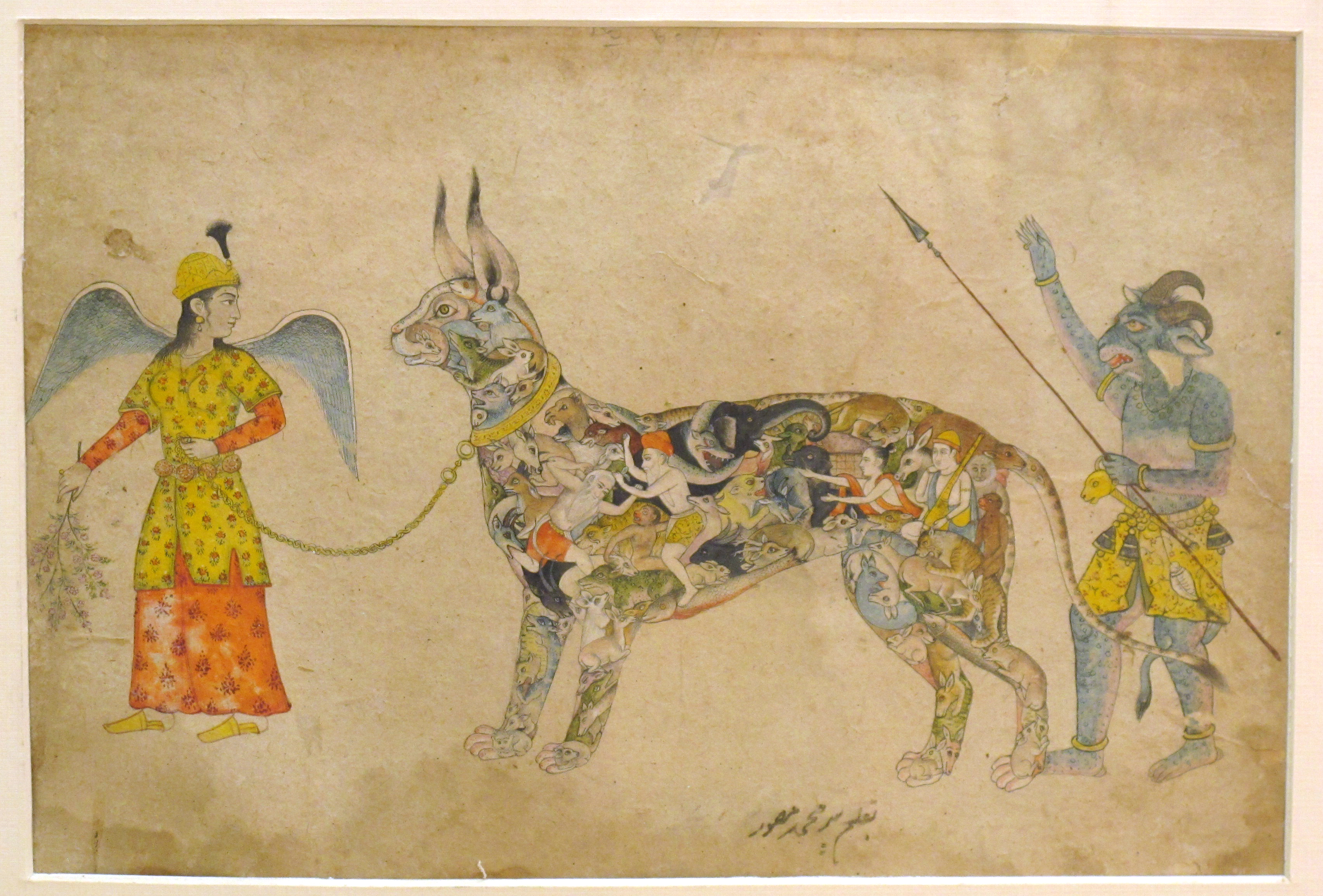
A pari (fairy) holding a composite animal. 19th-century Mughal-Rajput painting from State Museum, Bhopal, Madhya Pradesh, India.

One of the main and earliest Mughal style composition showcases the head of animals growing on different natural elements such as vines. A prominent example of this is the border of Jahangir's manuscript Farahang-i-Jahangir, which is made up of vines with the head of animals. Another type of Mughal style consists of a demon or pari (fairy) who is sitting on the composite creature or guiding the composite figure. In this case, the composite is generally composed of animals and human figures devouring each other. This style was copied in different Mughal schools such as Murshidabad, but were made in Hindu workshops. The most common composition seen in Hindu workshops was that of the composite camel.

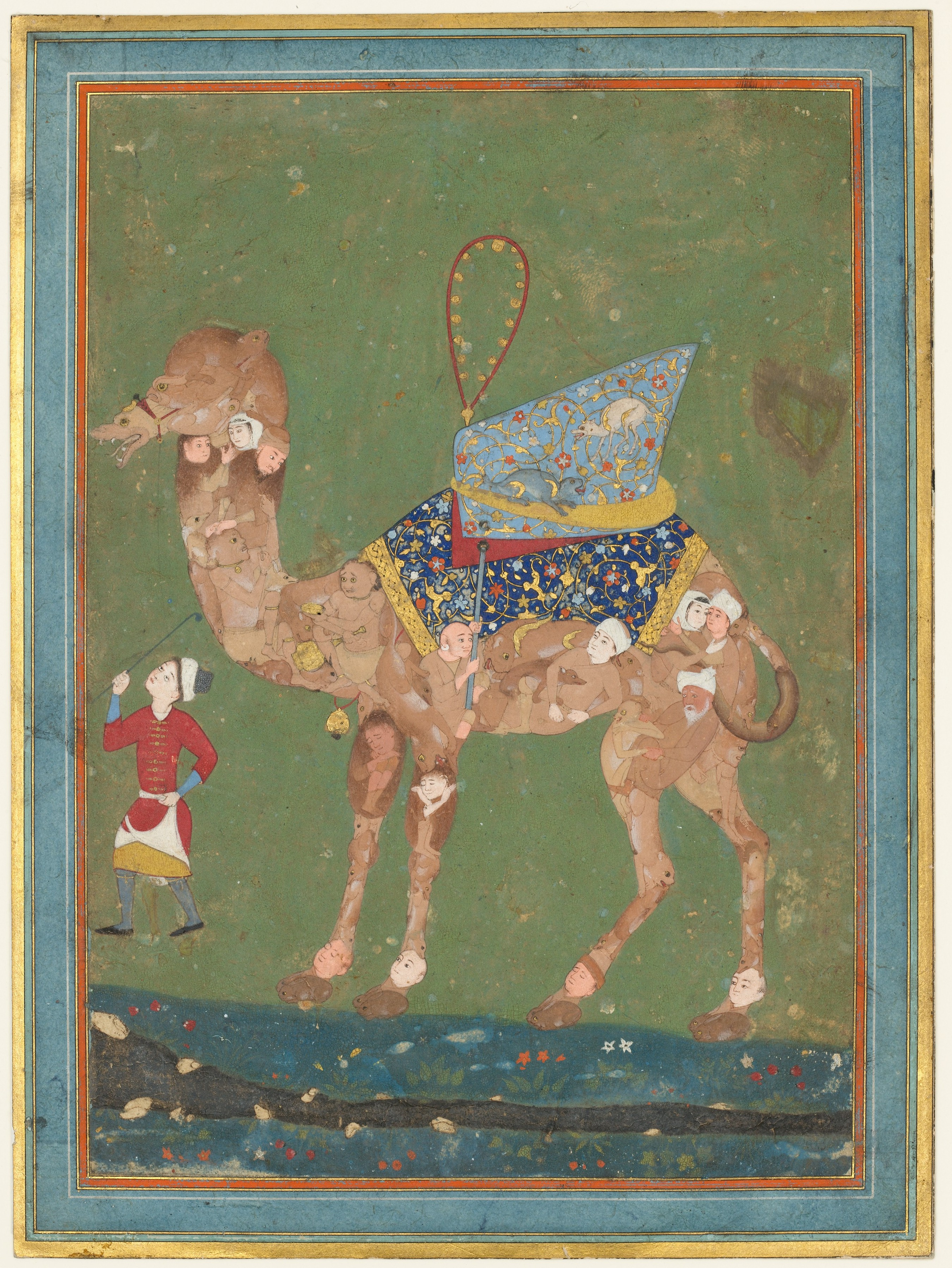
Composite camel, third quarter of 16th century, Metropolitan Museum of Art

There were also compositions of Hindu workshops being recreated in Deccan Muslim workshop like composite horse made up of human figures. In a Hindu composition, there are either five or seven women forming a horse. In the Deccan paintings, however, six men are seen forming a horse with the seventh as a rider. Common Hindu composite also consists of an elephant with nine women. As Hindus considered odd numbers to be auspicious, an odd count of figures appeared frequently. In the paintings of both later Mughal and Hindu period, scholars say that there is a natural flow which is missing in the previous artworks, typically seen in the tiger composition and camel composition from Bundi.

== Themes ==
There are three prominent themes based on which composite paintings were created. In the first case, the composite figures are being ridden by a human and the composite figure can be an animal or an object like a palanquin made of humans. Several 17th-century Hindu style paintings depict the composite mounted with Lord Krishna in addition to other humans. The folklore which inspired the painting was that when Krishna wanted to leave, the gopis (maiden) would insist he stay. If he did not agree, they would take form of different animals like an elephant, a horse, or a palanquin which could carry him. In the second type of the painting, the composite animal is not just made of humans but also of animals, plants, and, at times, demons. Plants with heads of animals and demons also fall in this category. The third type has the same composition as the second but has a human head; an example of this type is Buraq.

== Gallery ==
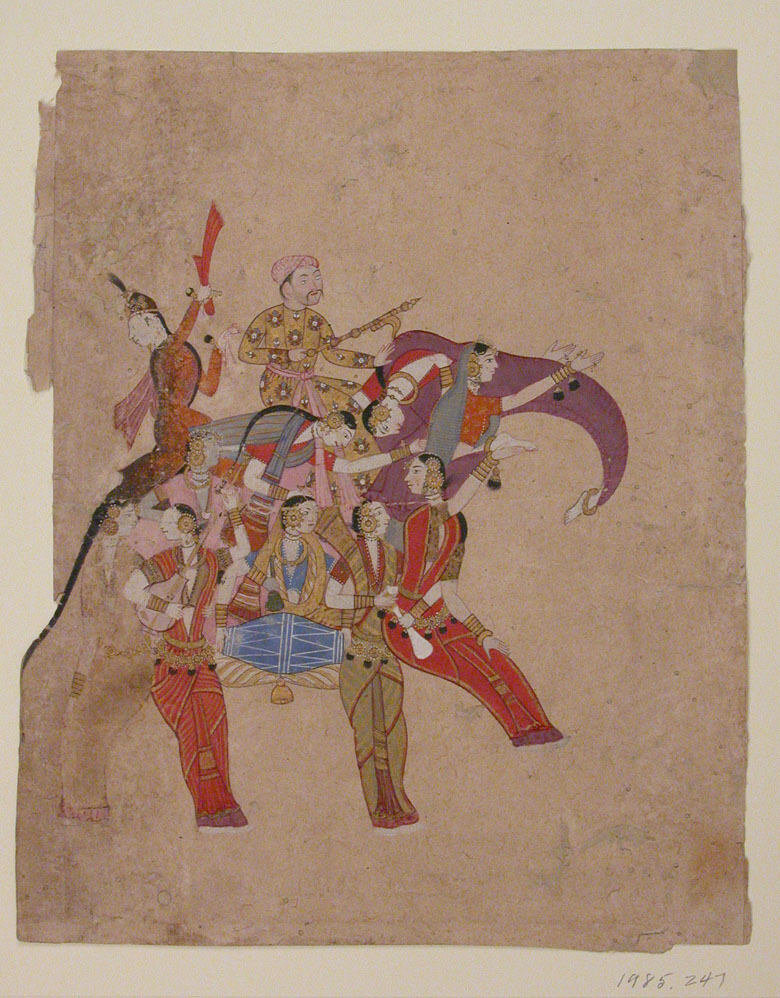
Composite Elephant, 17th century, Metropolitan Museum of Art

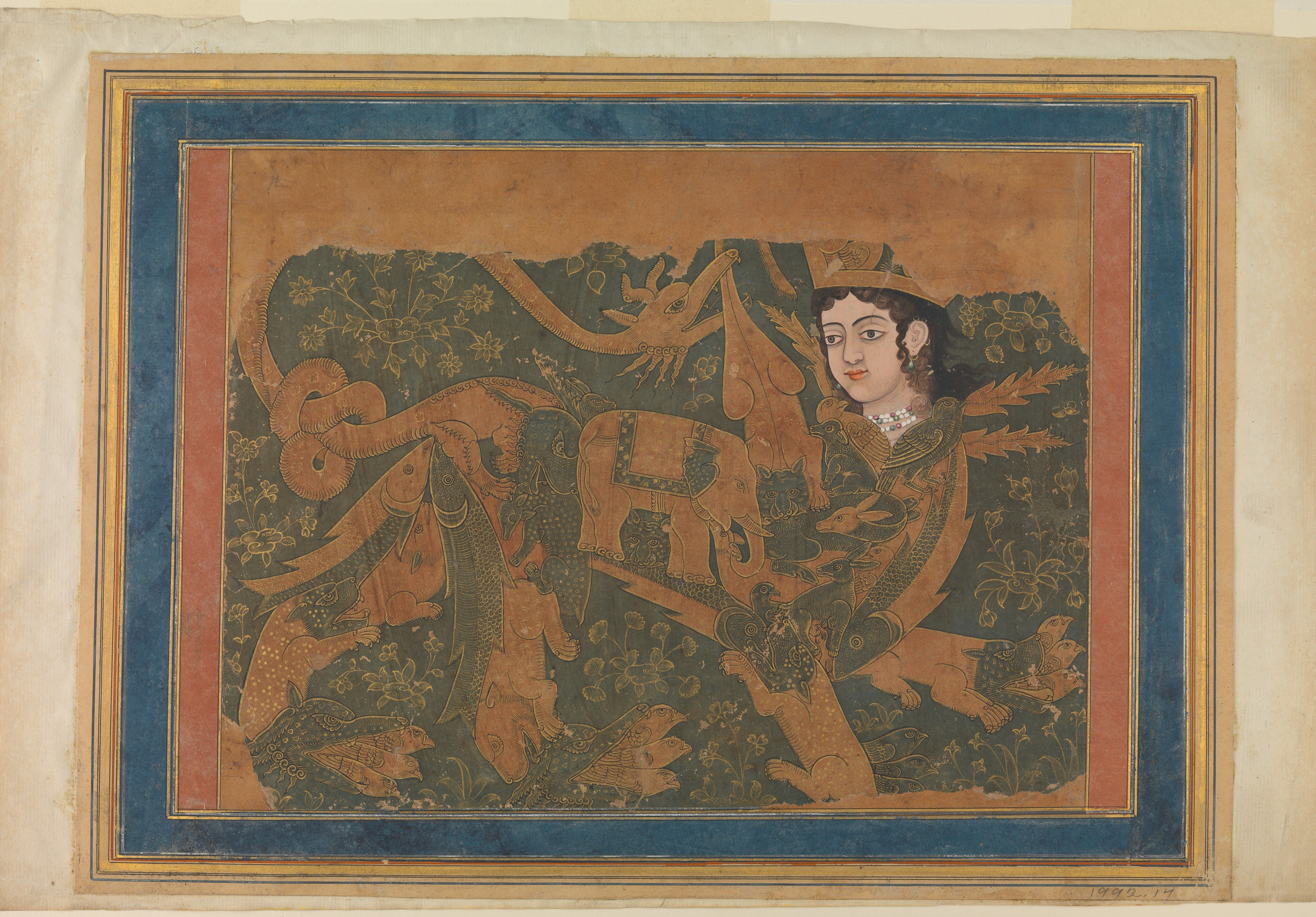
Buraq - mythical creature, composite painting, with a human head on composite creature, 1660-80, Metropolitan Museum of Art

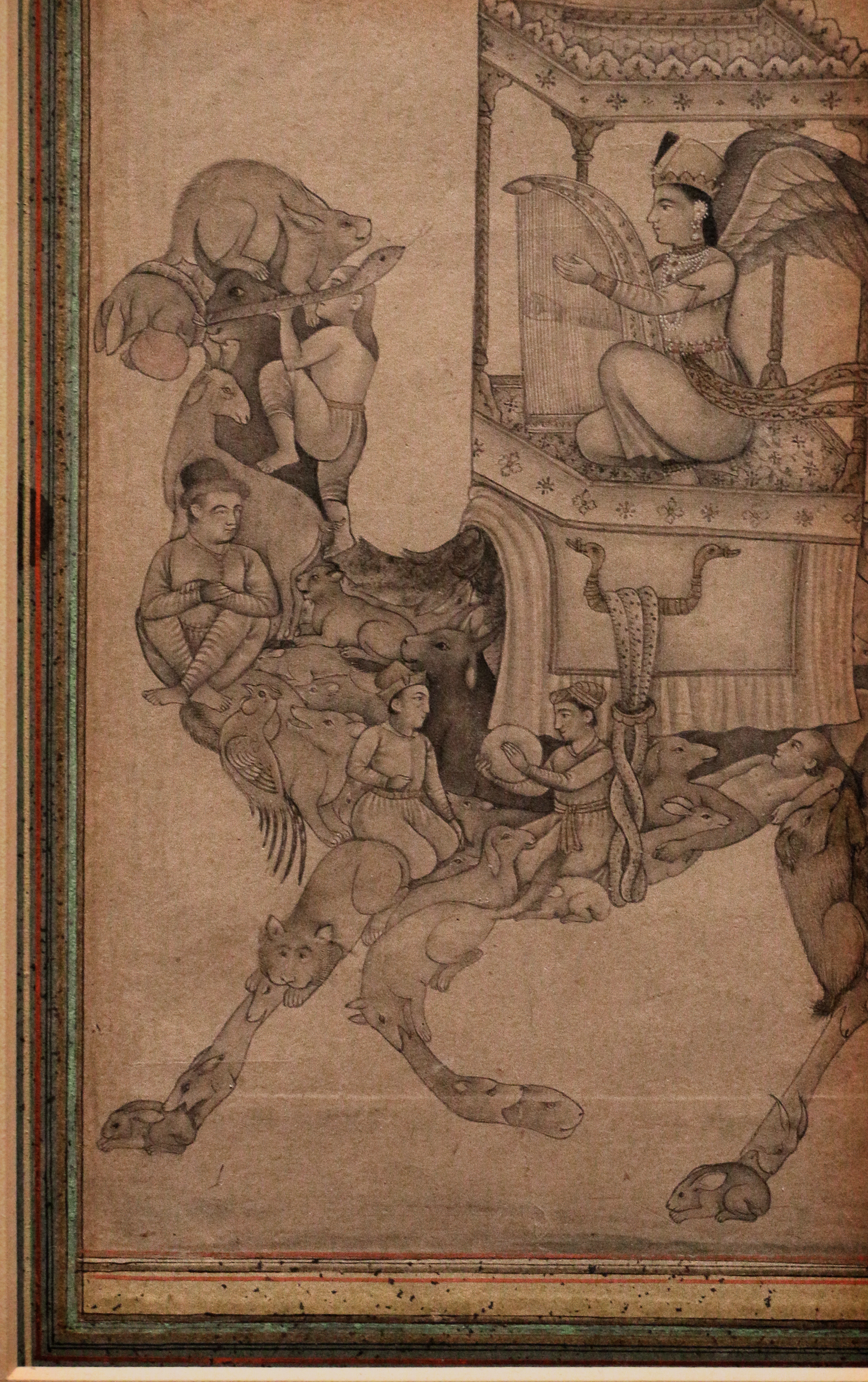
Composite camel with animals and humans mounted by a rider, 1700, Art Institute of Chicago

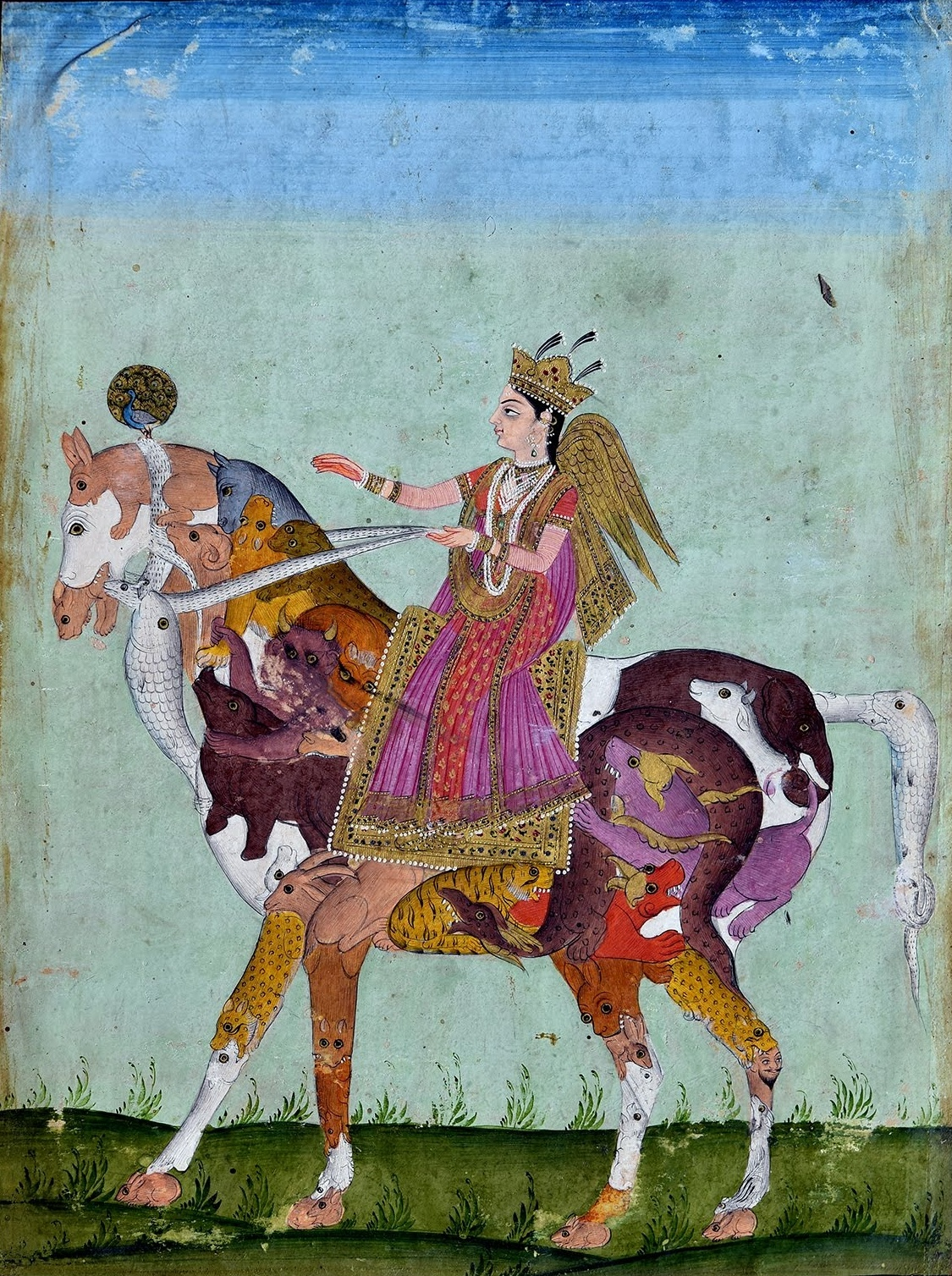
Pari (fairy) on a Composite Horse, 19th century, Salar Jung Museum
