= Vertumnus (Arcimboldo) =

1591 painting by Giuseppe Arcimboldo

Rudolf II as Vertumnus
- Artist: Giuseppe Arcimboldo
- Year: 1591
- Medium: Oil on panel
- Dimensions: 70 cm × 58 cm (28 in × 23 in)
- Location: Skokloster Castle, Sweden

Vertumnus is an oil painting produced by the Italian painter Giuseppe Arcimboldo in 1591 that consists of multiple fruits, vegetables and flowers that come together to create a portrait of Holy Roman Emperor Rudolf II. Although Arcimboldo's colleagues commented that Vertumnus was scherzo, or humorous, there were intentional political meanings behind the piece, particularly regarding the choice of fruits, vegetables, and flowers. Arcimboldo's choice to include these items was also an intentional reference to the Roman god, Vertumnus.

Vertumnus was presented to Rudolf II after its completion. It was seized by the Swedish army after the Thirty Years' War. Although art historians lost track of Vertumnus after this shift, it reappeared in 1845 in Sweden in Skokloster Castle, where it remains.

== Historical context ==
=== Holy Roman Emperor Rudolf II ===
During Rudolf II's 29-year rule in Hungary and Bohemia, art was celebrated and praised. His time as Holy Roman Emperor, now named "Rudolfine Prague", set an unprecedented era for the appreciation of art, with much of this cultivation pushed by Rudolf II himself. This acceptance of art is what allowed Arcimboldo to thrive in his court, especially with the unprecedented, unique style Arcimboldo came to be known for.

The initial impression of Arcimboldo's Vertumnus was that it was joke due to the whimsical nature of the piece. However, Vertumnus was not meant to be presented only as a joke. Rather, the use of fruits and vegetables were meant to display Rudolf II's "metamorphoses of power over the world for a ruler". The imperial patron behind Vertumnus, the specific fruit choices that act as power propaganda, and the copies of Vertumnus that were distributed throughout Europe, "all suggest their role as political allegories".

Rudolf II's portrait itself encapsulated the perfect balance and harmony with nature, arts, and science, all of which Rudolf II believed he represented during his reign. These portraits were an expression of the Renaissance mind's fascination with riddles, puzzles, and the bizarre. The search for unique, fascinating pieces of art was a common trend among Renaissance elites which lent Arcimboldo the perfect opportunity to fascinate viewers with his distinctive style. Although Arcimboldo's traditional religious subjects were later forgotten, his portraits of human heads composed of objects were greatly admired by his contemporaries.

== Style ==
=== Theme ===
Giuseppe Arcimboldo was well known for his unique combination of flora, fruits and other various objects in his paintings. Vertumnus has become one of Arcimboldo's most popular paintings that he produced, and this particular art style was encouraged while he was employed in Rudolf II's court. Arcimboldo created a series of works that utilized these still life images such as the Four Seasons, Four Elements, and The Librarian. Ultimately, Arcimboldo would create Vertumnus which drew on much of his experience in the royal court.

=== Mannerism ===
During Arcimboldo's time in Rudolf II's court, he was able to refine his unique style that would lead many to later regard Arcimboldo's approach as "typical...of mannerism". Mannerism is a particular art style that lasted from the 1530s to the 1600s. Mannerist artists focused on greatly displaying their technique, their exaggeration of figures, and decorative elements resulting in extremely stylized and hyperbolic pieces. Contemporarily, Arcimboldo is thought of as one of the first pioneers of the Mannerist art style especially due to his unique use of still life images.

== Fruits, vegetables and flowers ==
The portrait of the emperor is created out of fruits, flowers and vegetables. It includes plants from all seasons: gourds, pears, apples, cherries, grapes, wheat, artichokes, beans, peas, corns, onions, cabbage foils, chestnuts, figs, mulberries, plums, pomegranates, various pumpkins and olives.

Arcimboldo's choice of fruits, vegetables and flowers not only alluded to Emperor Rudolf II's reign, but also referenced his power and wealth. During the Renaissance, collections of oddities and foreign luxury goods were status symbols for the rich. Great families of the Renaissance such as the Medici collected flora, foods, animals (both living and dead) and other materialistic objects to display their wealth and reach (as many people in those days could not afford such luxuries) and thus, goods from the New World began to trickle into the kunstkammer or wunderkammer of many elites. Arcimboldo's use of corn as Emperor Rudolf II's ear (a crop originating from the New World) thus can be seen as a pointedly political decision. By putting in these particular foreign crops, Rudolf II is revealing that he has access to these items showcasing his power and wealth.

== Interpretations ==
The political interpretation of Vertumnus revolves around Rudolf II's rule. In the interpretation, Vertumnus acts as a statement claiming that the known world was claimed under Rudolf II and reveals his intention to defeat the Turks, not for the sake of Christianity but rather for the sake of global power and the everlasting Habsburg dynasty. Politically, Vertumnus has also been interpreted to reveal that Rudolf II's power as the Holy Roman Emperor did not only apply to his subjects and kingdom, but to nature itself (again referencing back to the god Vertumnus). There is also a poetic interpretation that was derived from Arcimboldo's piece. When Arcimboldo compared Rudolf II to Vertumnus, the emperor took on Vertumnus as a representation of himself. While Vertumnus could change his form at will, Rudolf II was known to change his moods at will, too. In Roman mythology, Vertumnus is the god of changing seasons, gardens, fruit trees, and plant growth. These aspects of Vertumnus indicate an "underlying permanence" to the god which in turn reflects back onto Rudolf II's rule. Furthermore, this particular god was present during the birth of Rome which acts as another allusion to the Holy Roman Emperor, Rudolf II.

== Provenance ==
Vertumnus was commissioned by Rudolf II during Arcimboldo's employment at his court and was presented to the emperor in 1591. After the Thirty Years' War, the portrait's ownership was seized by the Swedish army. Presently, the exact date of when Vertumnus became part of the Skokloster castle's collection is unknown. It is known that the Swedish Queen Christina was able to obtain Vertumnus. It is rumored that Vertumnus was a gift from the Queen Christina to Karl Gustav Wrangel—proprietor of Skokloster. However, when asked how Vertumnus ended up at Skolkloster Castle or why Vertumnus could not be identified at Skokloster Castle before 1845, Bengt Kylsberg, a curator at Skokloster Castle, stated that, "That mystery remains to be solved!".

In 1988, it was determined that a conservation effort was needed to restore Vertumnus from its poor condition. Arcimboldo's techniques and the medium he used were carefully observed and a preservation technique using krill enzymes (isolated from Antarctic krill) was applied to Vertumnus. Vertumnus now hangs in the Skokloster Castle as part of its art collection.
