= Giuseppe Arcimboldo =

Italian painter (1527–1593)

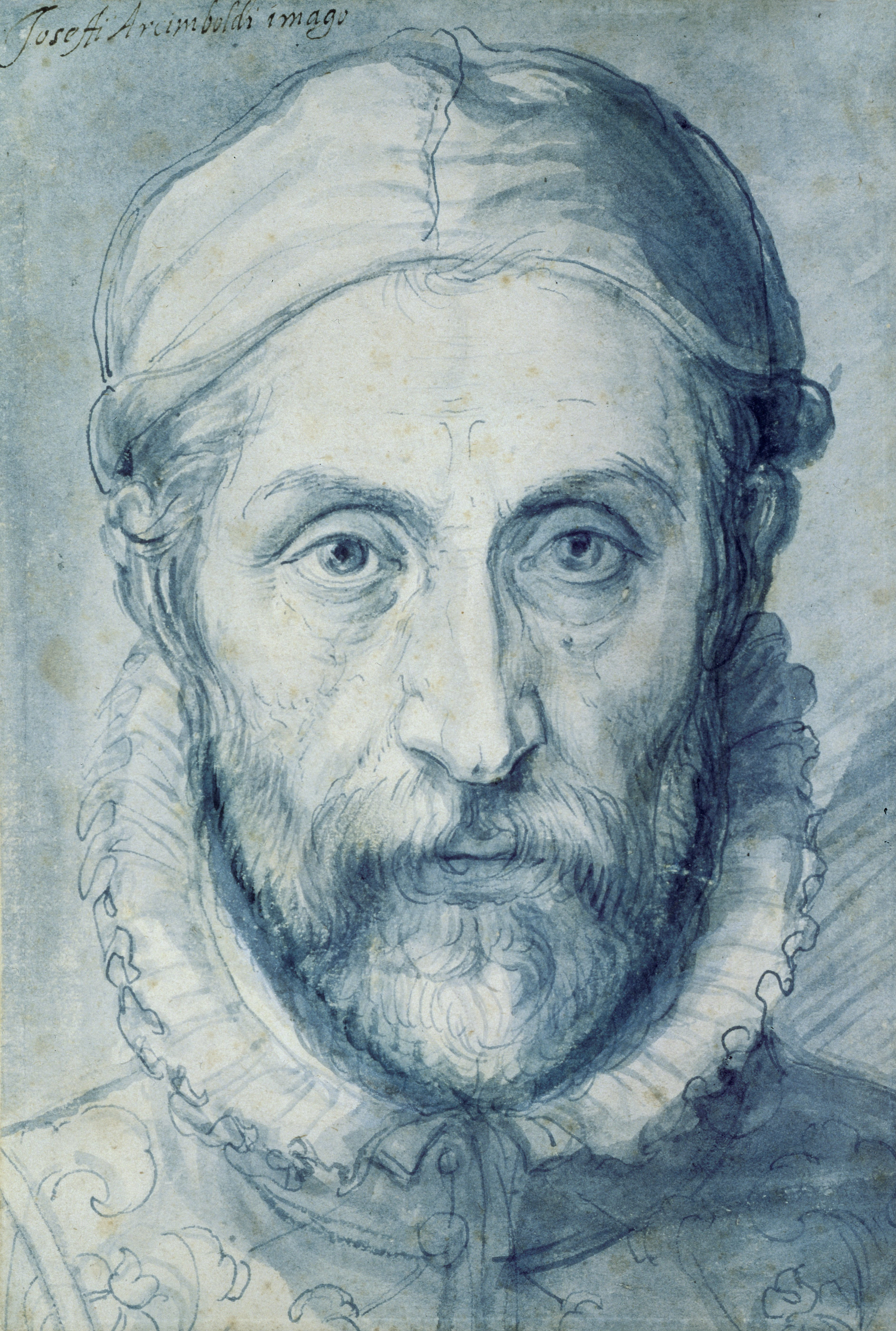
- Self-portrait, now in National Gallery Prague
- Born: 5 April 1527; Milan, Duchy of Milan, Holy Roman Empire
- Died: 11 July 1593 (aged 67); Milan, Duchy of Milan, Habsburg Spain
- Known for: Painting
- Notable work: The Librarian, 1566 Vertumnus, 1590–1591 Flora, c. 1591

Giuseppe Arcimboldo, also spelled Arcimboldi (Italian: [dʒuˈzɛppe artʃimˈbɔldo]; 5 April 1527 – 11 July 1593), was an Italian Mannerist painter best known for creating imaginative portraits in the shapes of human heads, though composed entirely of objects such as fruits, vegetables, flowers, fish and books.

These works form a category distinct from his other artwork. He was a conventional court painter of portraits for three Holy Roman Emperors in Vienna and Prague, as well as religious subjects and a series of coloured drawings of exotic animals in the imperial menagerie, among other things. He specialized in grotesque symbolical compositions of fruits, animals, landscapes, or various inanimate objects arranged into human forms.

The odd still life portraits were clearly partly intended as curiosities to amuse the court; critics, however, have speculated as to how seriously they were associated with Renaissance Neo-Platonism or other intellectual currents of the day.

== Biography ==
Vertumnus, a portrait depicting Rudolf II, Holy Roman Emperor, painted as Vertumnus, the Roman god of the seasons, c. 1590–91. Skokloster Castle, Sweden.

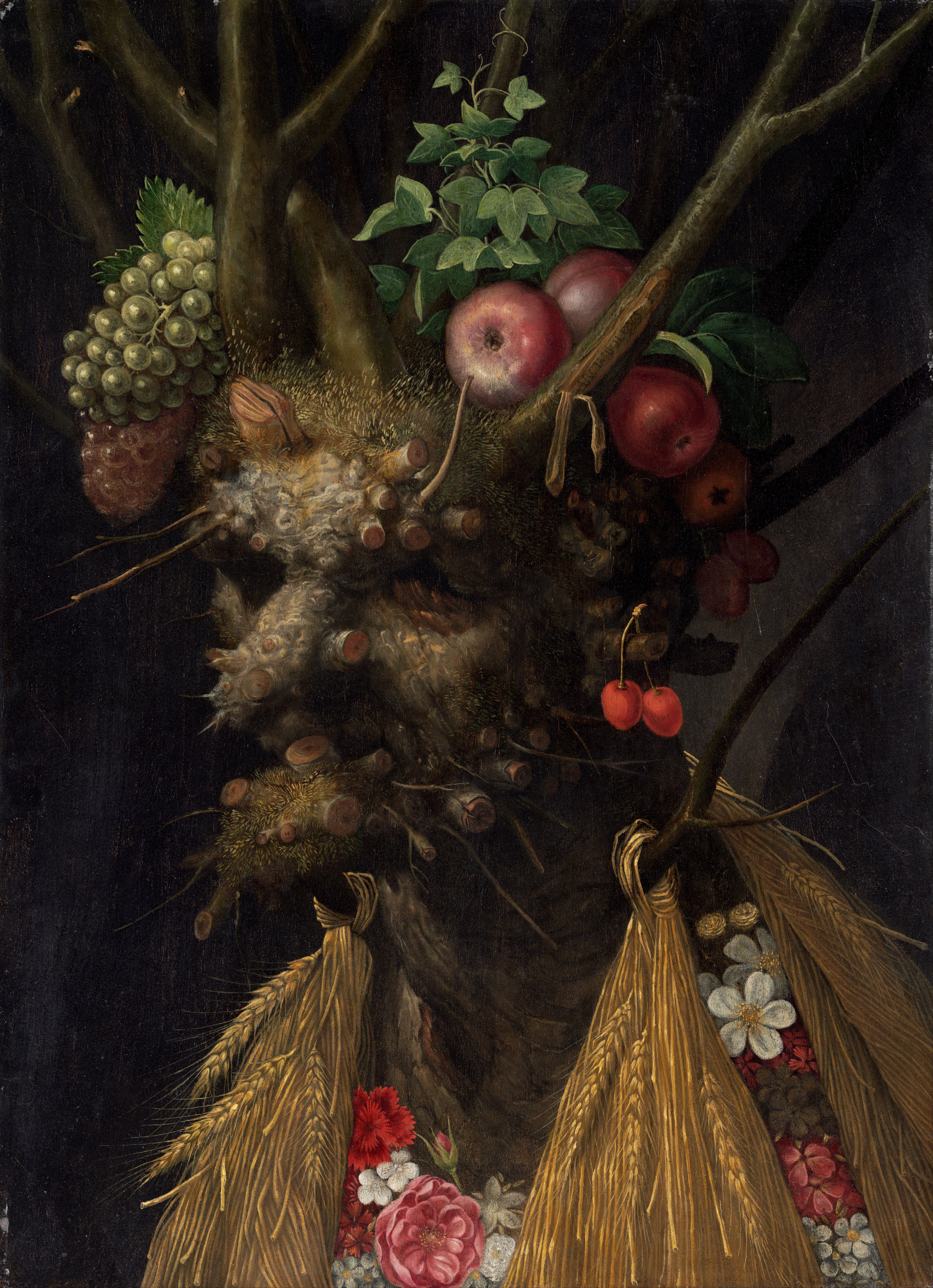
Four Seasons in One Head, c. 1590, National Gallery of Art, U.S.

Giuseppe's father, Biagio Arcimboldo, was an artist of Milan, Italy. Like his father, Giuseppe Arcimboldo started his career alongside his father as a designer for stained glass and frescoes at local cathedrals when he was 21 years old.

Apart from the instruction Arcimboldo received from his father he was also taught by the Milanese painter Giuseppe Meda and by Bernardino Campi. Arcimboldo's father was a goid friend of Bernardo Luini, a former student of Leonardo da Vinci, who after Leonardo's death inherited many of his workbooks and sketches. It is strongly believed that Luini shared these with his friend, Arcimboldo senior who in turn shared them with his son.

Arcimboldo's father died in 1551 and Arcimboldo remained working in Lombardy. In 1558 created designs for tapestries for the Como Cathedral and the Monza Cathedral.

In 1562, he became court portraitist to Ferdinand I at the Habsburg court in Vienna, Austria replacing the elderly Jakob Seisenegger whose eye-sight was failing. Arcimboldo would hold the position under Ferdinand's son and successor Maximilian II and his son Rudolf II at the court in Prague. Arcinboldo was also the court decorator and costume designer. Augustus, Elector of Saxony, who visited Vienna in 1570 and 1573, saw Arcimboldo's work and commissioned a copy of his The Four Seasons which incorporates his own monarchic symbols.

Arcimboldo's conventional work, on traditional religious subjects, has fallen into oblivion, but his portraits of human heads made up of vegetables, plants, fruits, sea creatures and tree roots, were greatly admired by his contemporaries and remain a source of fascination today.

At a distance, his portraits look like normal human portraits. However, individual objects in each portrait actually overlap together to make various human anatomical shapes. They were carefully constructed by his imagination. The assembled objects in each portrait were not random: each was related by characterization. In the portrait now represented by several copies called The Librarian, Arcimboldo used objects that signified the book culture at that time, such as the curtain that created individual study rooms in a library. The animal tails, which became the beard of the portrait, were used as dusters. By using everyday objects, the portraits were decoration and still-life paintings at the same time. His works showed not only nature and human beings, but also how closely they were related.

After a portrait was released to the public, some scholars, who had a close relationship with the book culture at that time, argued that the portrait ridiculed their scholarship. In fact, Arcimboldo criticized rich people's misbehavior and showed others what happened at that time through his art. In The Librarian, although the painting might have appeared ridiculous, it also contained a criticism of wealthy people who collected books only to own them, rather than to read them.

Art critics debate whether his paintings were whimsical or the product of a deranged mind. A majority of scholars hold to the view, however, that given the Renaissance fascination with riddles, puzzles, and the bizarre (see, for example, the grotesque heads of Leonardo da Vinci), Arcimboldo, far from being mentally imbalanced, catered to the taste of his times.

Art historians have attempted to link Arcimboldo's composite heads to motifs prevalent in the Greco-Roman era, although the evidence for this remains tenuous. There is much stronger evidence for that Arcimboldo was inspired by Northern European art as composite heads appears in art by Hieronymus Bosch, René Boyvin and Tobias Stimmer.

Arcimboldo retired to Milan together with his son in 1587,taking up residence in the house of his friend, the mathematican and poet Giovanni Filippo Gherardini.

It was during this last phase of his career that he produced the composite portrait of Rudolph II (see adjascent), as well as his self-portrait as the Four Seasons. His Italian contemporaries honored him with poetry and manuscripts celebrating his illustrious career.

When the Swedish army invaded Prague in 1648, during the Thirty Years' War, many of Arcimboldo's paintings were taken from Rudolf II's collection.

Arcimboldo's works can be found in Vienna's Kunsthistorisches Museum and the Habsburg Schloss Ambras in Innsbruck; the Louvre in Paris; as well as in numerous museums in Sweden. In Italy, his work is in Cremona, Brescia, and the Uffizi Gallery in Florence. The Denver Art Museum in Denver, Colorado; the Menil Foundation in Houston, Texas; and the Candie Museum in Guernsey also hold Arcimboldo works. The Real Academia de Bellas Artes de San Fernando in Madrid owns a painting of The Spring by Arcimboldo.

Arcimboldo is known as a 16th-century Mannerist. A transitional period from 1520 to 1590, Mannerism adopted some artistic elements from the High Renaissance and influenced other elements in the Baroque period. A Mannerist tended to show close relationships between human and nature. Arcimboldo also tried to show his appreciation of nature through his portraits. In The Spring, the human portrait was composed of only various spring flowers and plants. From the hat to the neck, every part of the portrait, even the lips and nose, was composed of flowers, while the body was composed of plants. On the other hand, in The Winter, the human was composed mostly of roots of trees. Some leaves from evergreen trees and the branches of other trees became hair, while a straw mat became the costume of the human portrait.

== Legacy ==
Arcimboldo's work is thought inspired other artists, both during his own lifetime and after his death. Notable contemporaries who created similar composite heads includes Giovanni Andrea Maglioli and Antonio Zucchi.

In 1976, the Spanish sculptor Miguel Berrocal created the original bronze sculpture interlocking in 20 elements titled Opus 144 ARCIMBOLDO BIG as a homage to the Italian painter. This work was followed by the limited-edition sculpture in 1000 copies titled Opus 167 OMAGGIO AD ARCIMBOLDO (HOMAGE TO ARCIMBOLDO) of 1976–1979 consisting of 30 interlocking elements.

The works of Arcimboldo, especially his multiple images and visual puns, were rediscovered in the early 20th century by Surrealist artists such as Salvador Dalí. The exhibition entitled "The Arcimboldo Effect: Transformations of the face from the 16th to the 20th Century” at the Palazzo Grassi in Venice (1987) includes numerous 'double meaning' paintings. Arcimboldo's influence can also be seen in the work of Shigeo Fukuda, István Orosz, Octavio Ocampo, Vik Muniz, and Sandro del Prete, as well as the films of Jan Švankmajer.

Arcimboldo's works are used by some psychologists and neuroscientists to determine the presence of lesions in the hemispheres of the brain that recognize global and local images and objects.

== Personal life ==
Though it is unclear if Arcimboldo ever married, he had a relationship with Ottilia (or Ottila) Stummeri, a woman of German descent. This resulted in the birth of a son, Benedetto Arcimboldo (b. 1575), who was legitimized by Maximilian II the following year.

It has been speculated that Benedetto Arcimboldo died young, possibly between 1587 and 1603.

== Art heritage, estimates ==
=== Heritage ===
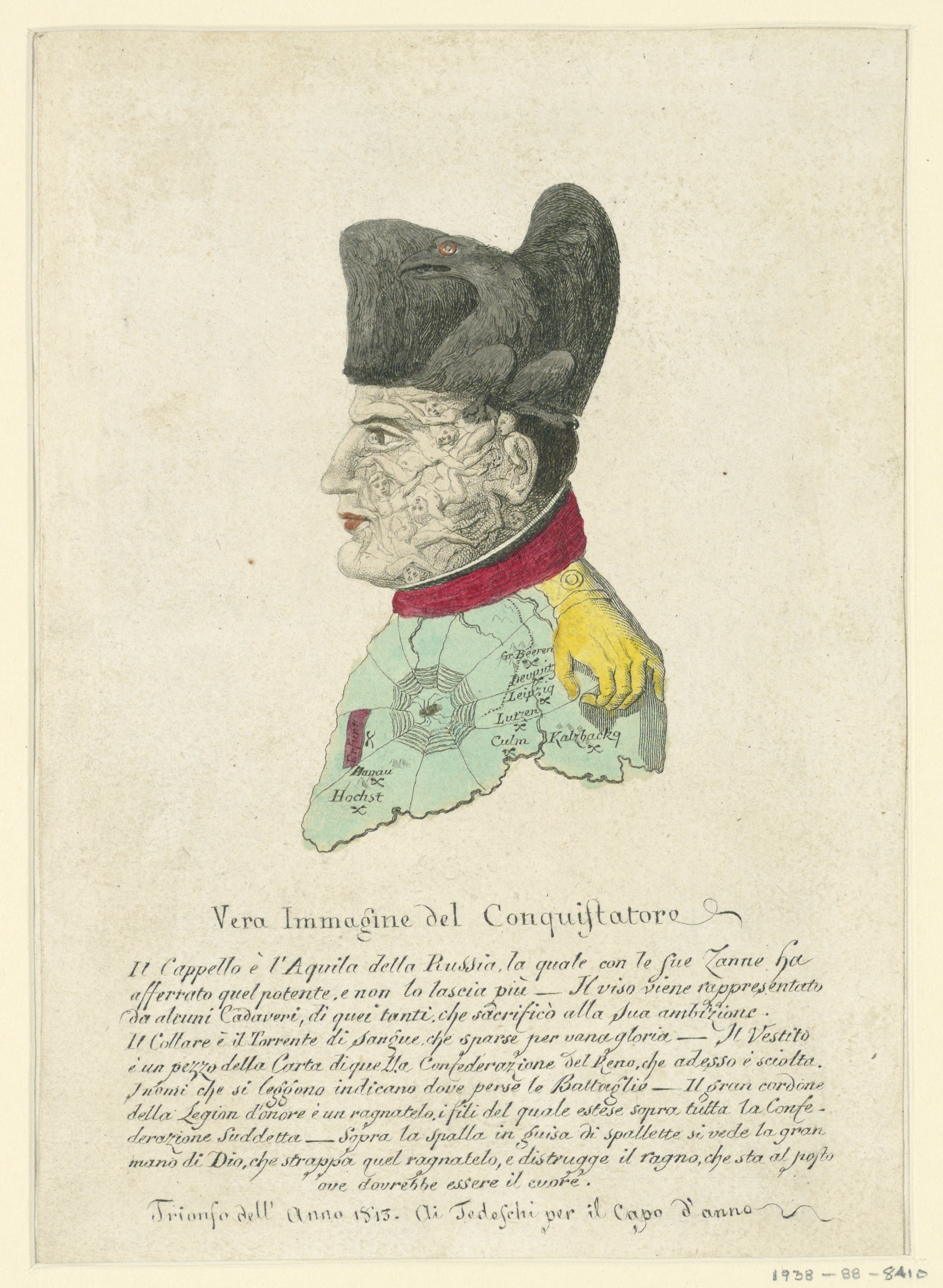
A 1813 Puzzle Picture of Napoleon, in the style of Giuseppe Arcimboldo, hand-colored etching, in the Cooper Hewitt, Smithsonian Design Museum (New York City)

Giuseppe Arcimboldo did not leave written certificates on himself or his artwork. After the deaths of Arcimboldo and his patron—the emperor Rudolph II—the heritage of the artist was quickly forgotten, and many of his works were lost. They were not mentioned in the literature of the 17th and 18th centuries. Only in 1885 did the art critic K. Kasati publish the monograph "Giuseppe Arcimboldi, Milan Artist" in which the main attention was given to Arcimboldi's role as a portraitist.

With the advent of surrealism its theorists paid attention to the formal work of Arcimboldo, and in the first half of the 20th century many articles were devoted to his heritage. Gustav René Hocke drew parallels between Arcimboldo, Salvador Dalí, and Max Ernst's works. A volume monograph of B. Geyger and the book by F. Legrand and F. Xu were published in 1954.

Thomas DaCosta Kaufmann examined the artist in his dissertation, "Variations on the Imperial theme in the age of Maximilian II and Rudolf II", published in 1978. His 2009 book, Arcimboldo: Visual Jokes, Natural History, and Still-Life Painting, summed up the attitude of modern art critics towards Arcimboldo. In 1980, Roland Barthes published an article devoted to Arcimboldo's works.

Archimboldo's relation with surrealism was emphasized at landmark exhibitions in New York (Fantastic Art, Dada, Surrealism, 1937) and in Venice (Arcimboldo's Effect: Evolution of the Person in Painting from the XVI Century, Palazzo Grassi, 1987) where Arcimboldo's allegories were presented. The largest encyclopedic exhibition of Arcimboldo's heritage, where about 150 of his works were presented, including graphics, was held in Vienna in 2008. In spite of the fact that very few works of Arcimboldo are available in the art market, their auction cost is in the range of five to 10 million dollars. Experts note that it is very modest for an artist at such a level of popularity.

Arcimboldo's art heritage is badly identified, especially as it concerns his early works and pictures in traditional style. In total about 20 of his pictures remain, but many more have been lost, according to mentions of his contemporaries and documents of the era. His cycles Four Elements and Seasons, which the artist repeated with little changes, are most known. Some of his paintings include The Librarian, The Jurist, The Cook, Cupbearer, and other pictures. Arcimboldo's works are stored in the state museums and private collections of Italy (including Uffizi Gallery), France (Louvre), Austria, the Czech Republic, Spain, Sweden, and the US.

=== Art interpretations ===
The main object of modern art critics' interpretation are the "curious" paintings of Arcimboldo whose works, according to V. Krigeskort, "are absolutely unique". Attempts of interpretation begin with judgments of the cultural background and philosophy of the artist, however a consensus in this respect is not developed. B. Geyger, who for the first time raised these questions, relied mainly on judgments of contemporaries—Lomazzo, Comanini, and Morigia, who used the terms "scherzi, grilli, and capricci" (respectively, "jokes", "whims", "caprices"). Geyger's monograph is entitled: "Comic pictures of Giuseppe Arcimboldo". Geyger considered the works of the artist as inversion, when the ugliness seems beautiful, or, on the contrary, as the disgrace exceeding the beauty, entertaining the regal customer. A similar point of view was stated by Barthes, but he reduced works of the artist to the theory of language, believing that fundamentals of Arcimboldo's art philosophy is linguistic, because without creating new signs he confused them by mixing and combining elements that then played a role in the innovation of language.

Arcimboldo speaks double language, at the same time obvious and obfuscatory; he creates "mumbling" and "gibberish", but these inventions remain quite rational. Generally, the only whim (bizarrerie) which isn't afforded by Arcimboldo—he doesn't create language absolutely unclear ... his art not madly.

Arcimboldo's classification as mannerist also belongs to the 20th century, for example in Gustav René Hocke's work The world as a Labyrinth, published in 1957. Arcimboldo was born in the late Renaissance, and his first works were done in a traditional Renaissance manner. In Hocke's opinion, during the Renaissance era the artist had to be first of all a talented handicraftsman who skillfully imitated nature, as the idea of fine art was based on its studying. Mannerism differed from the Renaissance art in attraction to "not naturalistic abstraction". It was a continuation of artistic innovation in the late Middle Ages—art embodying ideas. According to G. Hocke, in consciousness there is concetto—the concept of a picture or a picture of the concept, an intellectual prototype. Arcimboldo, making a start from concetti, painted metaphorical and fantastic pictures, extremely typical of manneristic art. In Umberto Eco's On Ugliness Arcimboldo is described as belonging to the manneristic tradition for which "...the preference for aspiration to strange, extravagant and shapeless over expressional fine" is peculiar.

According to Plato's dialogue Timaeus, an immemorial god created the Universe from chaos by a combination of four elements—fire, water, air and the earth, as defines all-encompassing unity. In T. DaCosta Kauffman's works serious interpretation of heritage of Arcimboldo in the context of culture of the 16th century is carried out consistently. Kauffman in general was skeptical about attribution of works by Arcimboldo, and recognized as undoubted originals only four pictures, those with a signature of the artist. He based the interpretation on the text of the unpublished poem by J. Fonteo "The picture Seasons and Four Elements of the imperial artist Giuseppe Arcimboldo". According to Fonteo, the allegorical cycles of Arcimboldo transfer ideas of greatness of the emperor. The harmony in which fruits and animals are combined into images of the human head symbolizes harmony of the empire under the good board of the Habsburgs. Images of seasons and elements are always presented in profile, but thus Winter and Water, Spring and Air, Summer and Fire, Fall and Earth are turned to each other. In each cycle symmetry is also observed: two heads look to the right, and two—to the left. Seasons alternate in an invariable order, symbolizing both constancy of the nature and eternity of board of the Habsburgs' house. The political symbolism also hints at it: at the image of Air there are Habsburg symbols—a peacock and an eagle and Fire is decorated with a chain of the Award of the Golden Fleece, a great master of which by tradition was a head of a reigning dynasty. However it is made of flints and shod steel. Guns also point to the aggressive beginning. The Habsburg symbolics is present in the picture Earth, where the lion's skin designates a heraldic sign of Bohemia. Pearls and corals similar to cervine horns in Water hint at the same.

== In literature and popular culture ==
After Philip II had acquired some of Arcimboldo's paintings, a number of writers from seventeenth-century Spain alluded to his work. Grotesque images in Miguel de Cervantes's novel Don Quixote, such as an immense fake nose, recall his work. He also appears in the works of Francisco de Quevedo. Turning to contemporary Latin American literature, the first and last sections of 2666 (2008), Roberto Bolaño's last novel, concern a fictional German writer named Benno von Archimboldi, who takes his pseudonym from Arcimboldo. Arcimboldo's oil painting Water from his series The Four Elements was used as the cover of American rock band Kansas's 1975 album Masque.

== Gallery ==
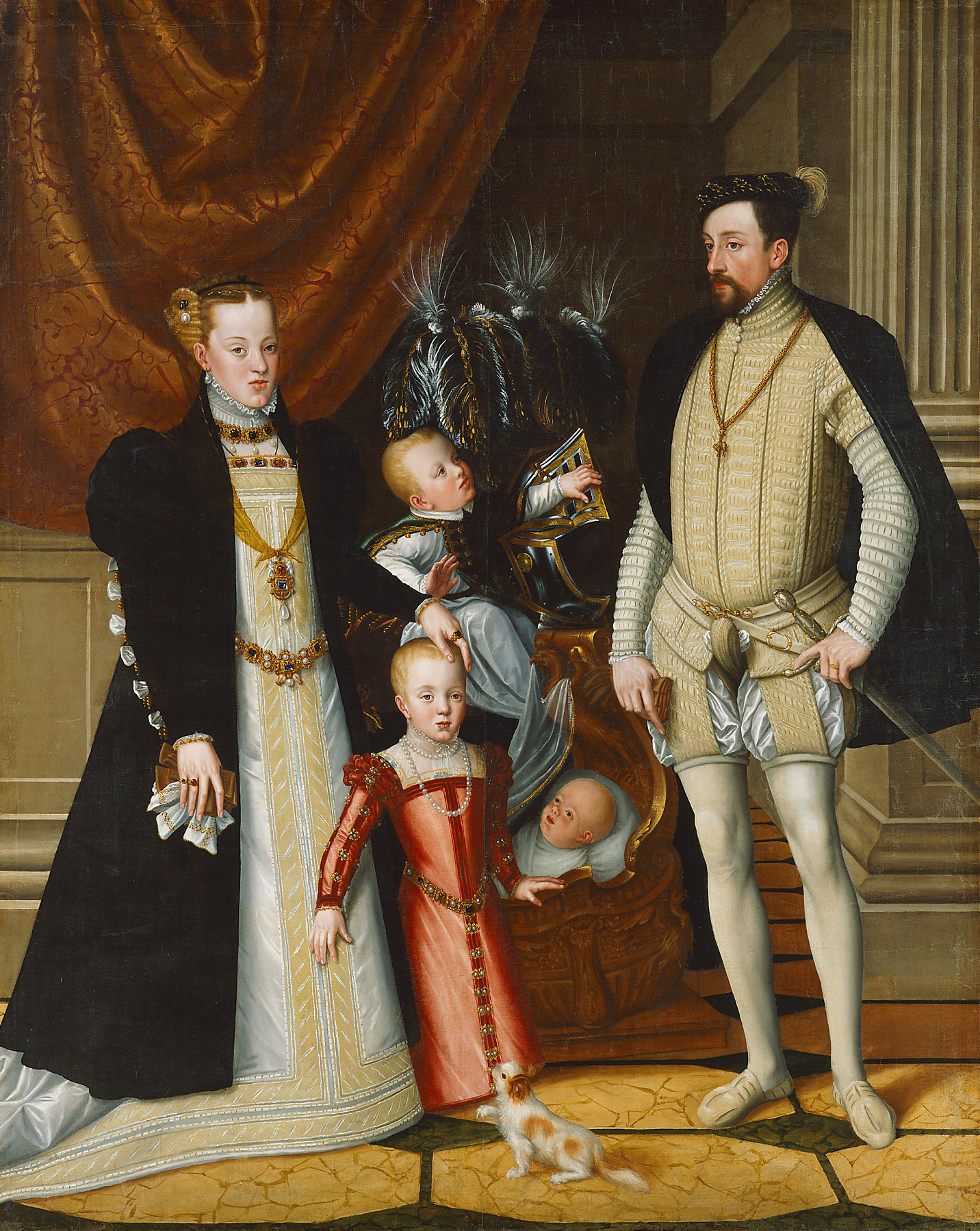
Holy Roman Emperor Maximilian II. of Austria and His Wife Infanta Maria of Spain with Their Children, c. 1563, Ambras Castle

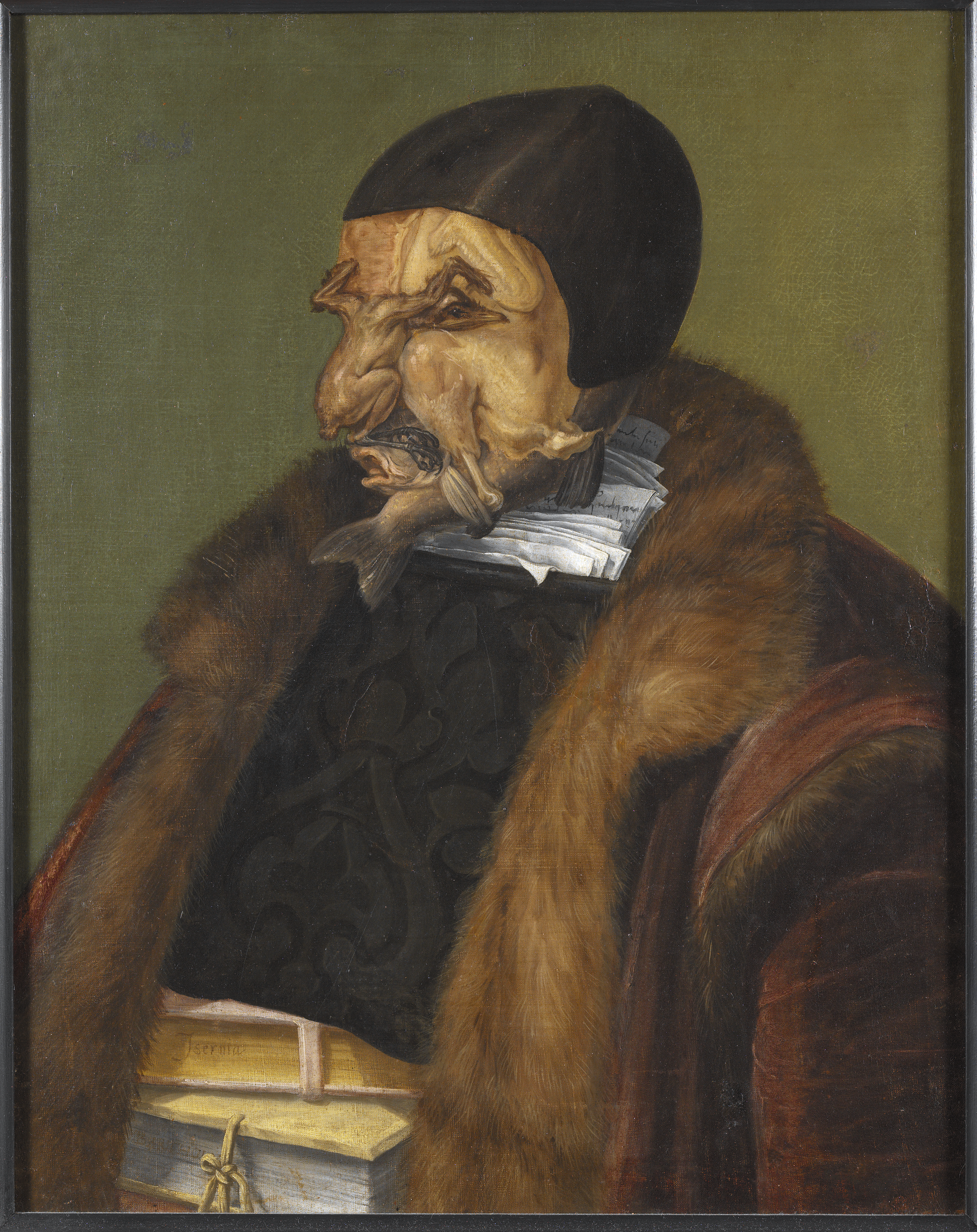
The Jurist, 1566, Nationalmuseum, Sweden

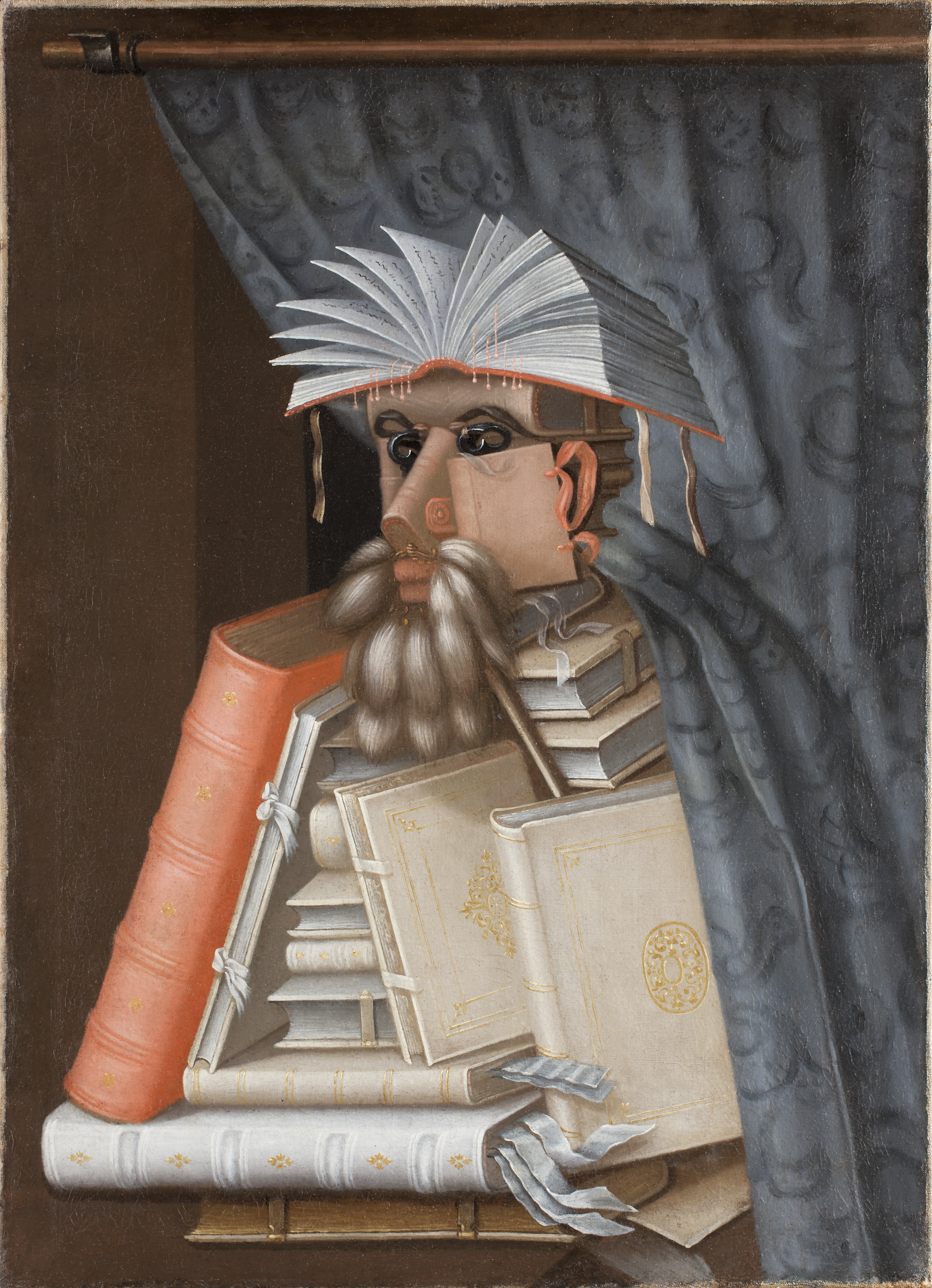
The Librarian, 1566, oil on canvas, Skokloster Castle, Sweden

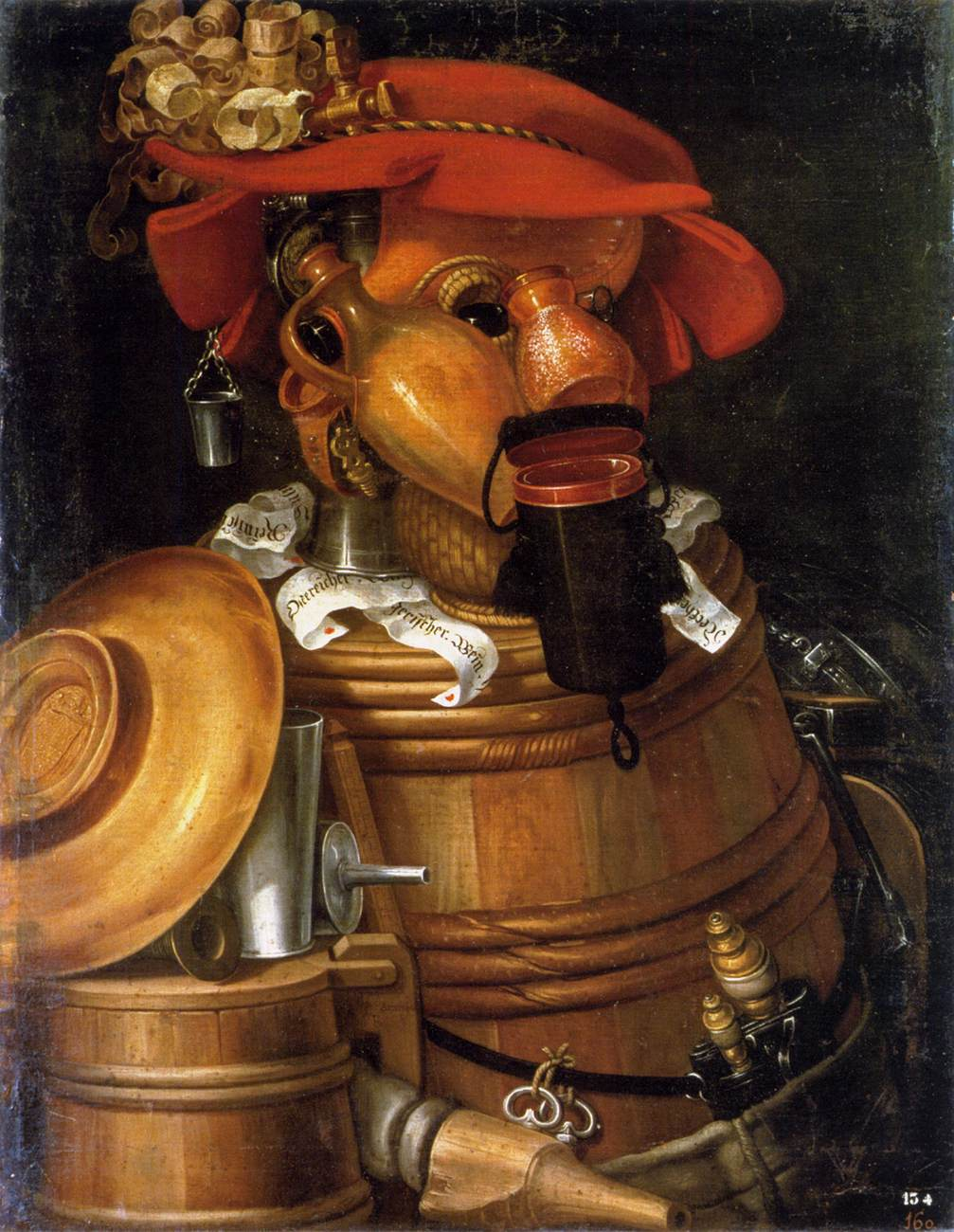
The Waiter, 1574, private collection

== Four Seasons ==
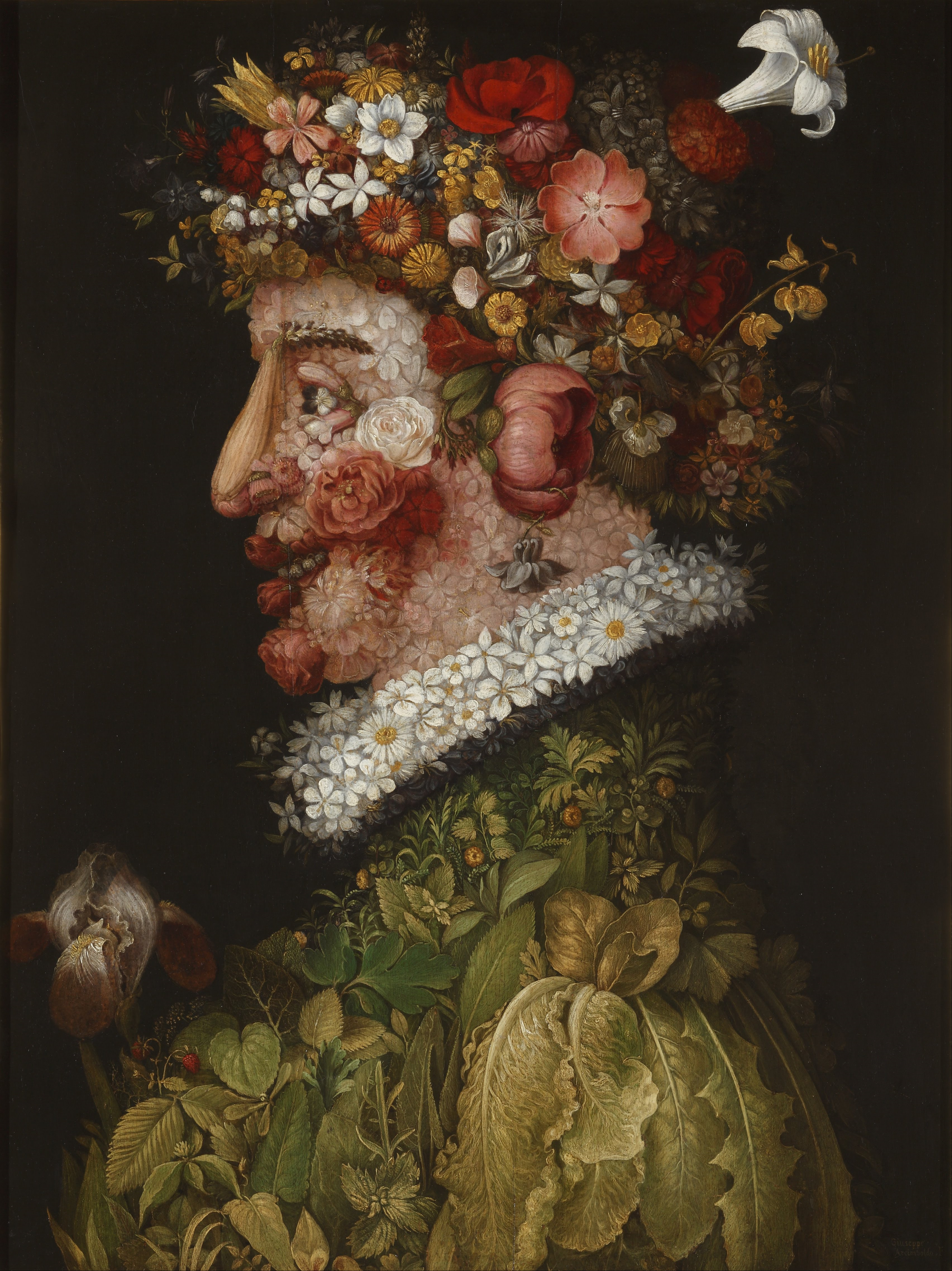
Spring, 1563, Real Academia de Bellas Artes de San Fernando, Madrid

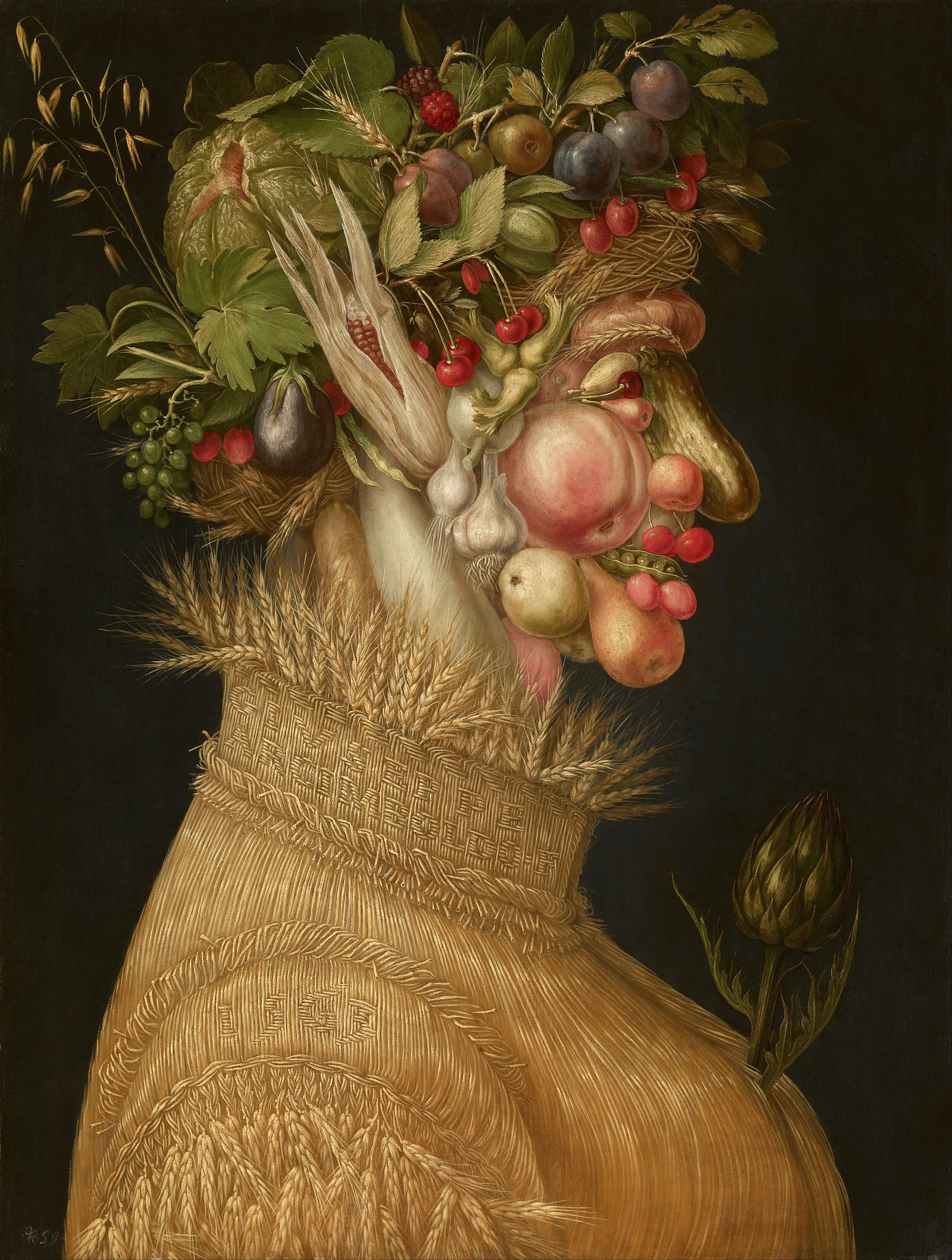
Summer, 1563, Kunsthistorisches Museum, Vienna

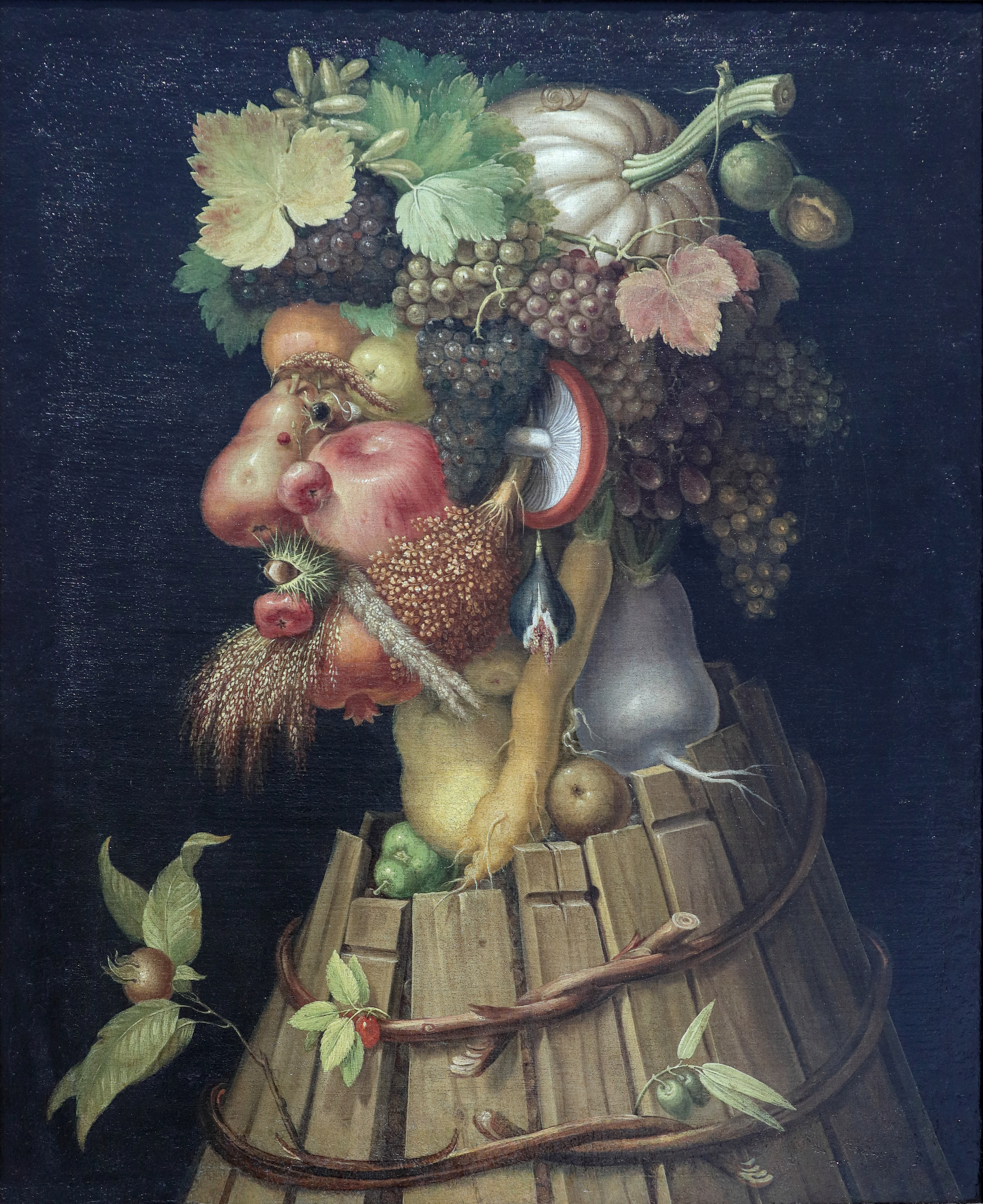
Autumn, 1573, Louvre, Paris

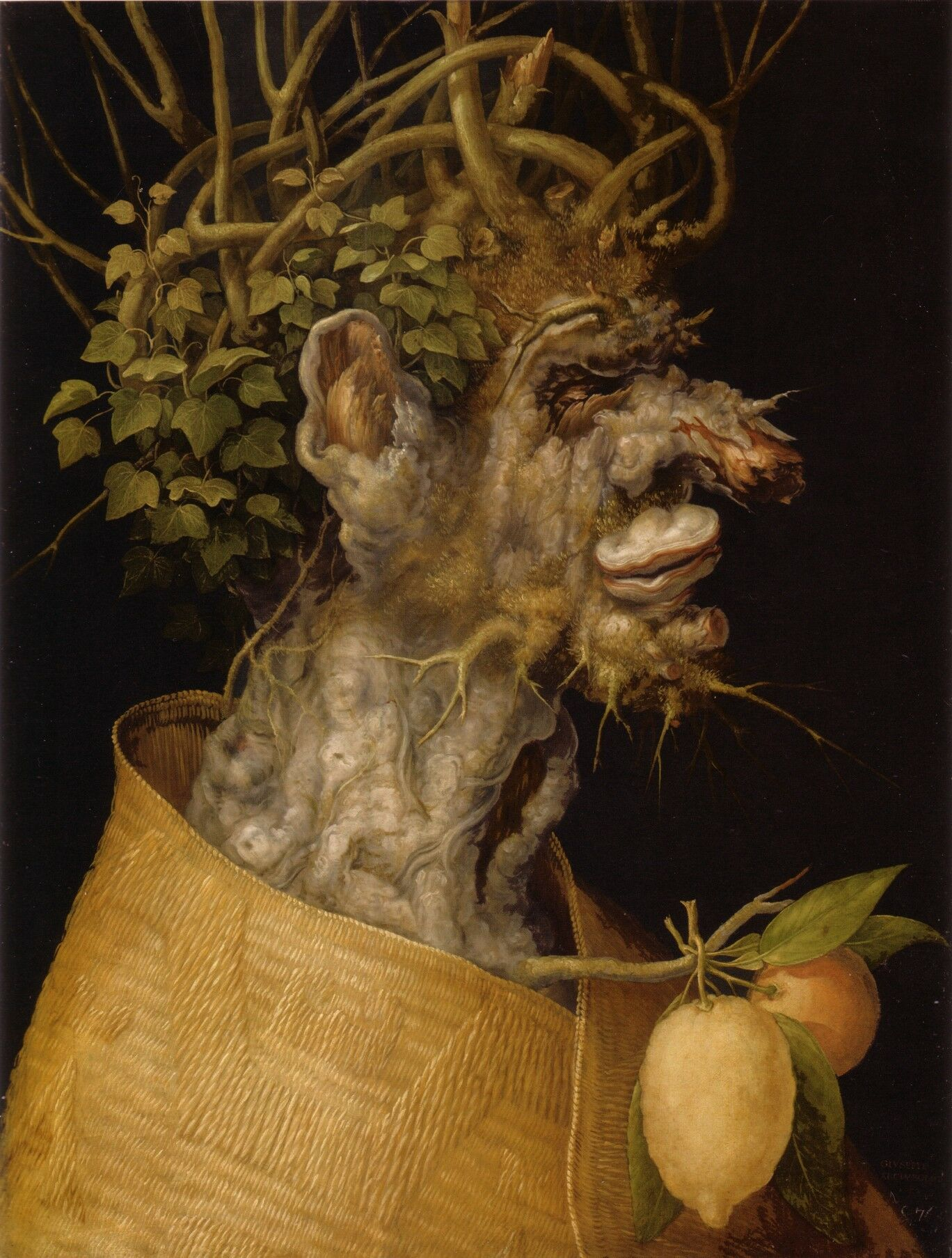
Winter, 1563, Kunsthistorisches Museum, Vienna

== Four Elements ==
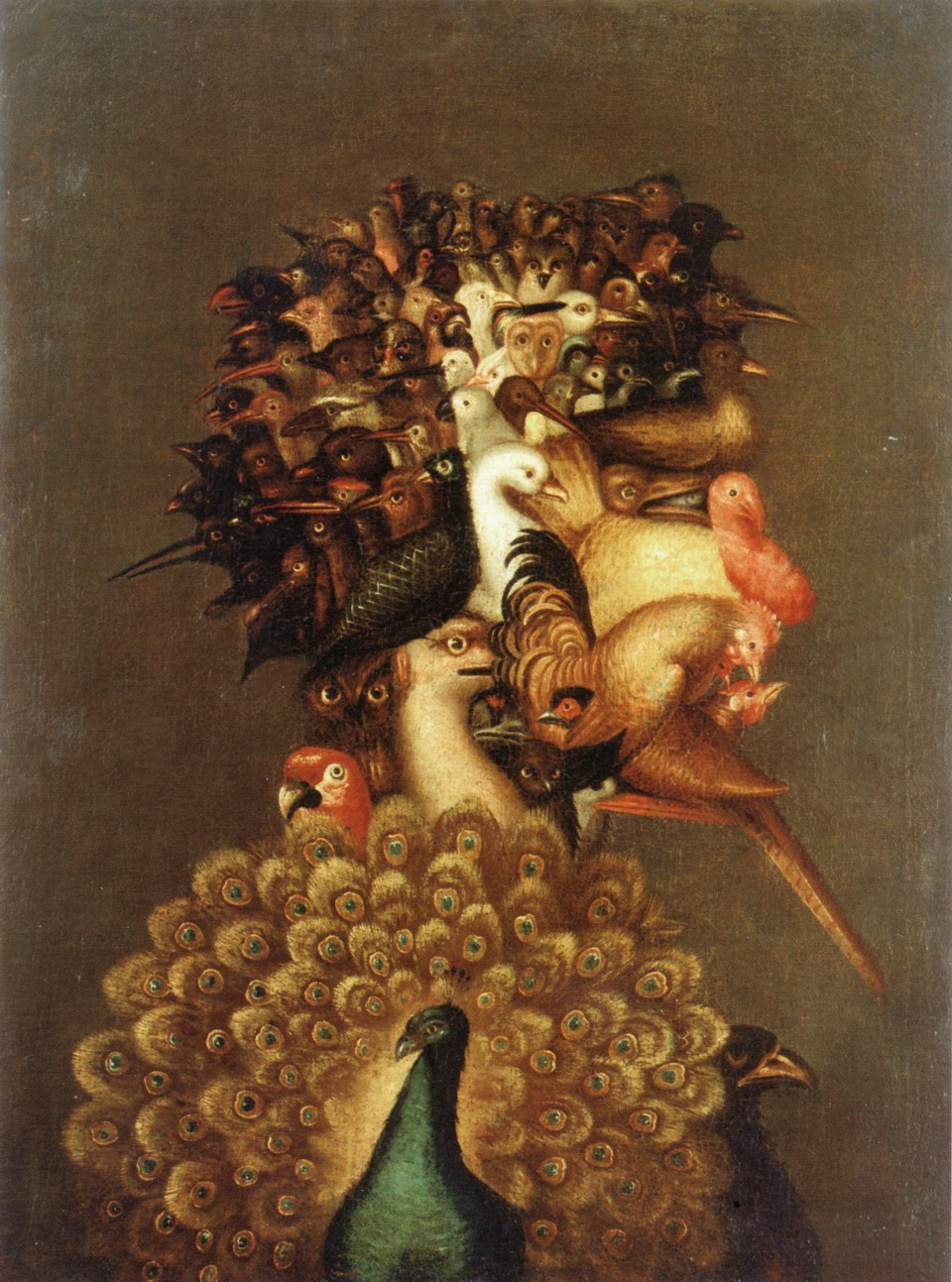
Air, c. 1566 (copy), private collection

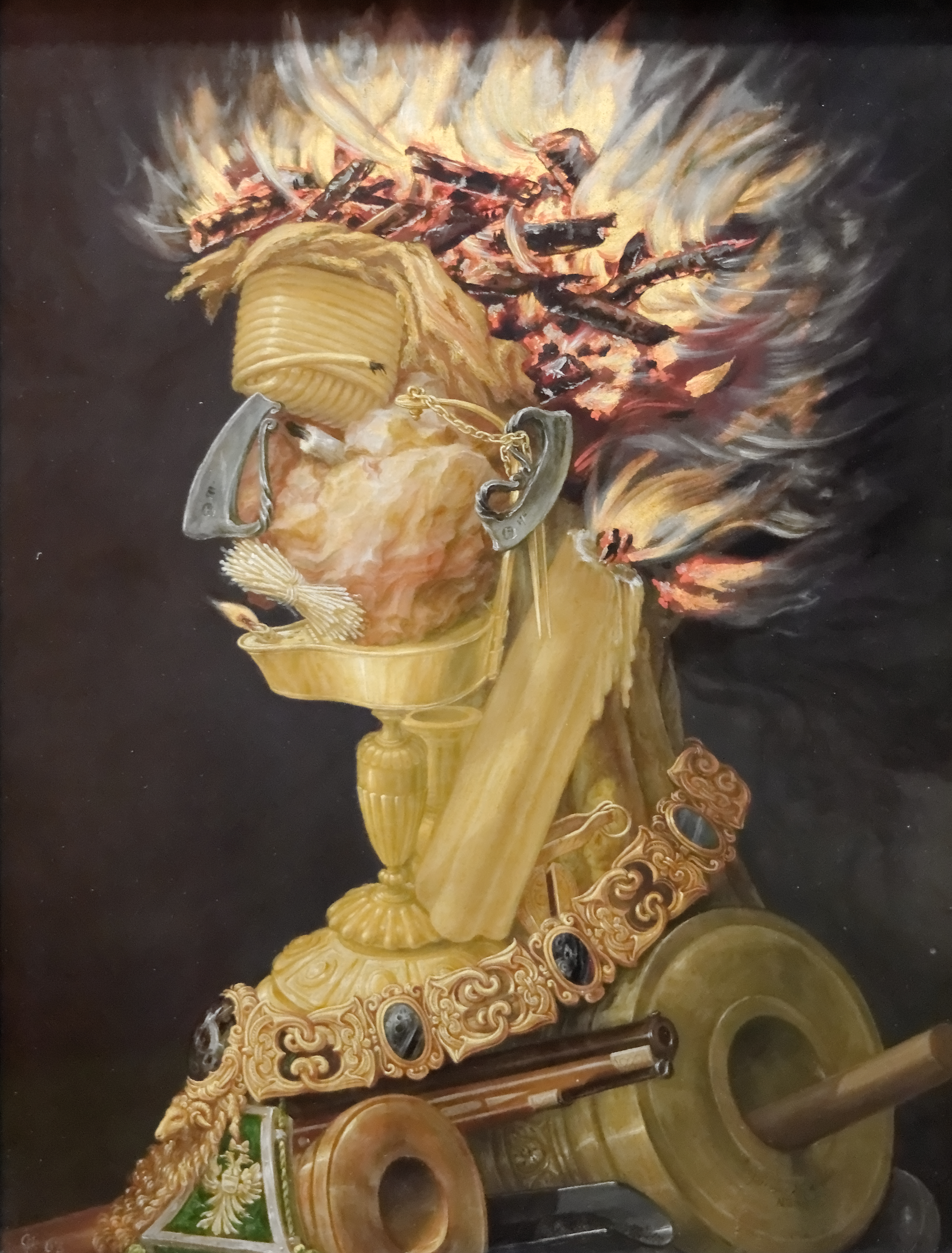
Fire, oil on wood, 1566, Kunsthistorisches Museum, Vienna

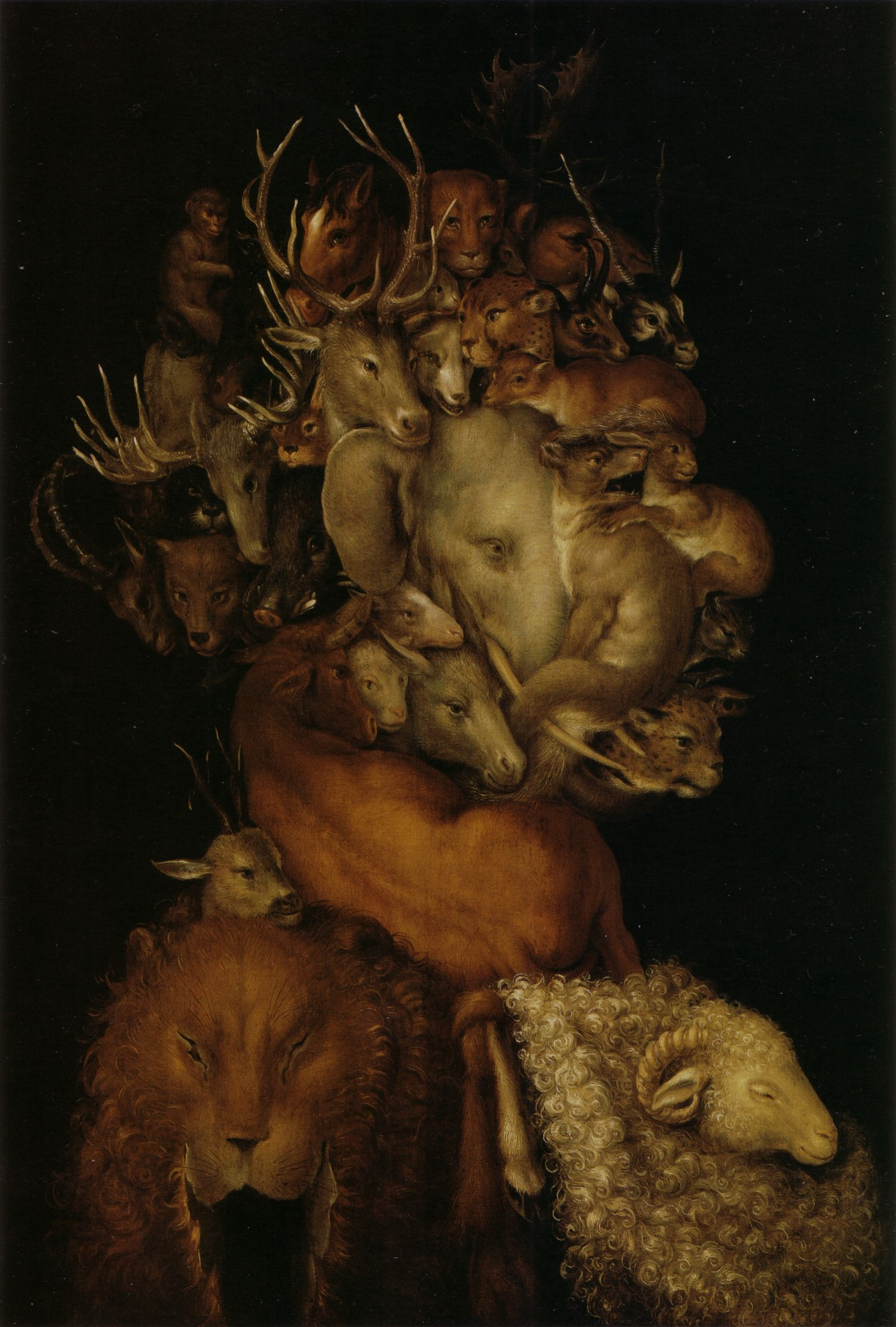
Earth, possibly 1566, private collection, Austria

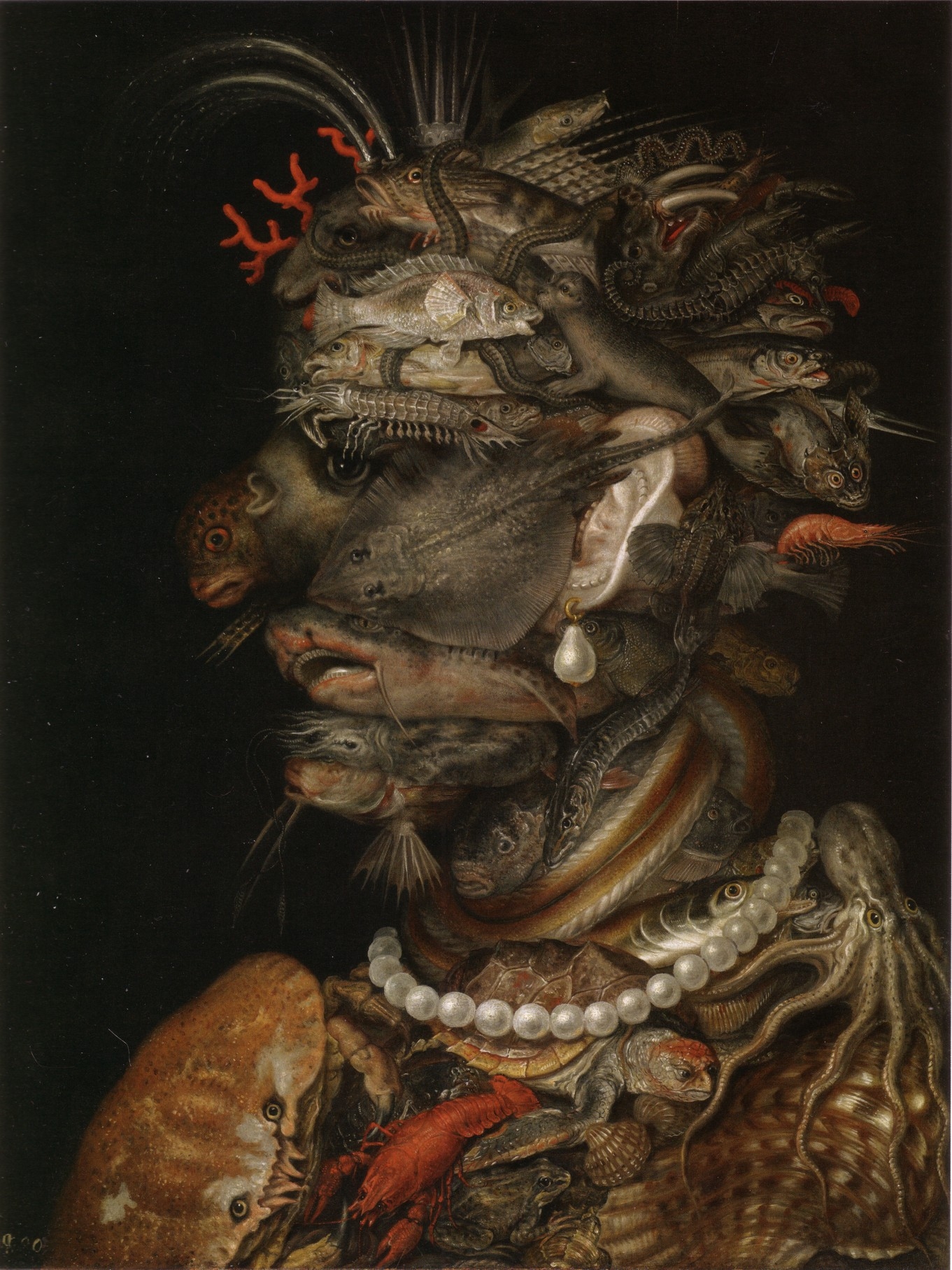
Water, 1566, Kunsthistorisches Museum, Vienna

== See also ==
- Art of the late 16th century in Milan
- Jan Brueghel the Elder
- Composite miniature painting
- Hidden faces
- Hide-and-Seek (painting)
- The Librarian (painting)
- Jan van Kessel the Elder
