= State Museum, Bhopal =

Art, culture museum in Madhya Pradesh, India

Coordinates: 23.2470°N 77.3923°E

State Museum
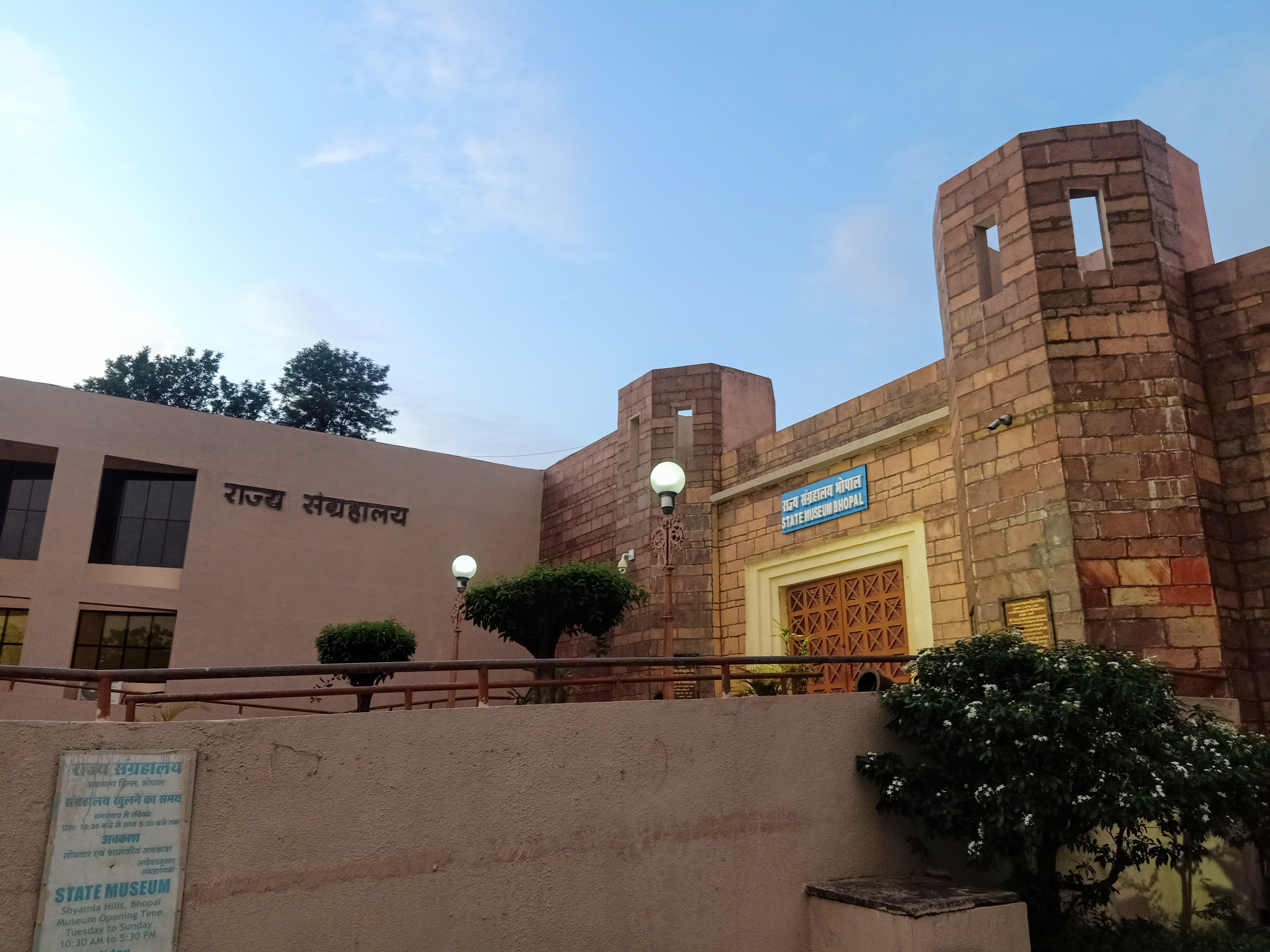
- State Museum entrance gate
- Established: 1964
- Location: Shyamla Hills, Bhopal, Madhya Pradesh, India
- Type: Art and Culture Museum
- Collection size: 11,515 items; (No. on display: 3,634; Items in reserve: 68%)
- Visitors: 20,683 (12 months 2019–2020)

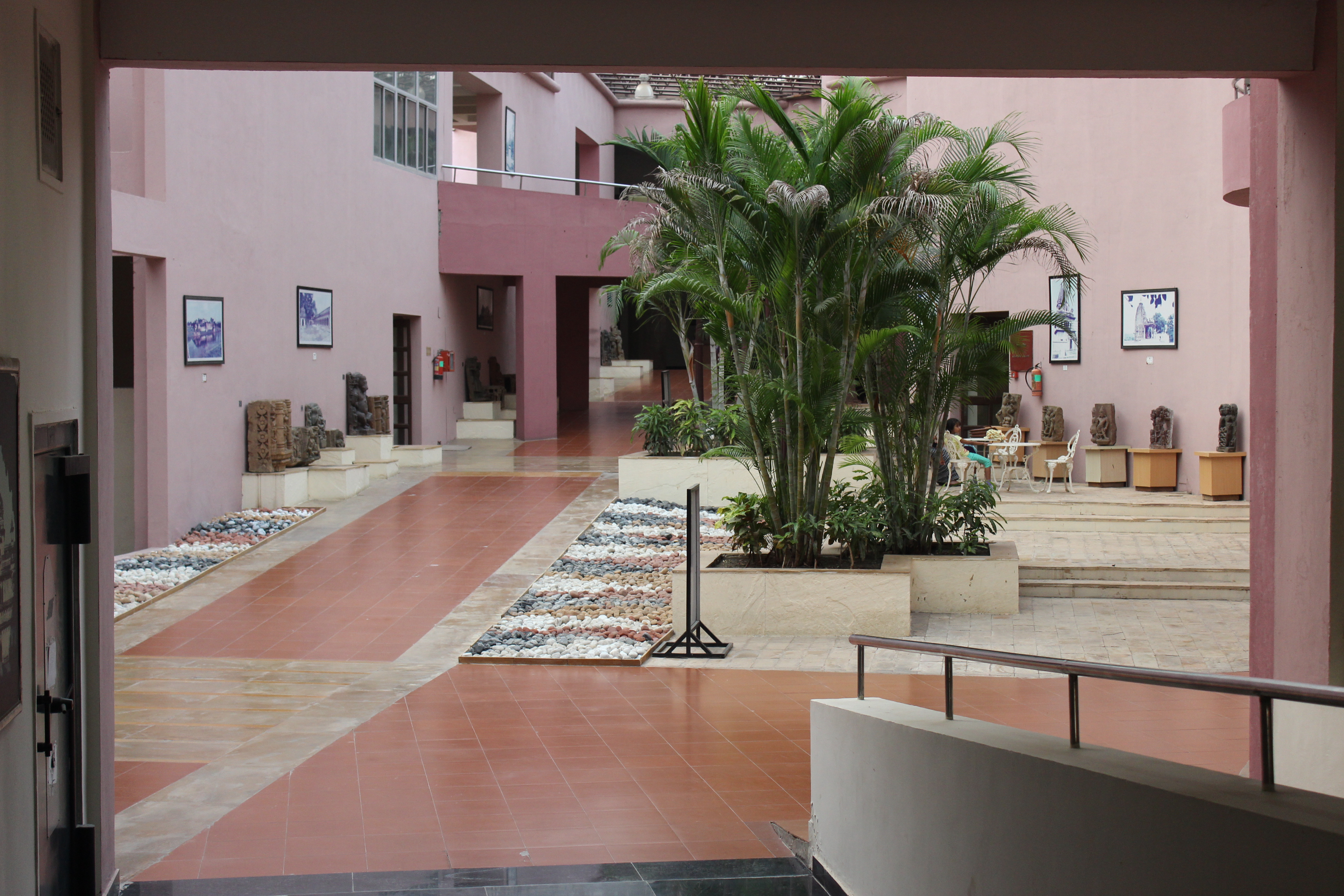
View from inside the State Museum

The State Museum Bhopal is located on Shymala Hills, in Bhopal, the capital city of the state of Madhya Pradesh in India. It is popular for its design and the breadth of its inventory of art and cultural artefacts. The museum holds a prominent role among the monuments and museums of Bhopal. It is open to the public from Tuesday to Sunday.

== The building ==
The State Museum Bhopal was established in 1964. Its current building was inaugurated on 2 November 2005, by the Madhya Pradesh Chief Minister, Shivraj Singh Chouhan. It has a contemporary design and was built to catch abundant natural light. The modern and architecturally innovative facility features wide spaces accessible by ramps.

== Collections and display ==
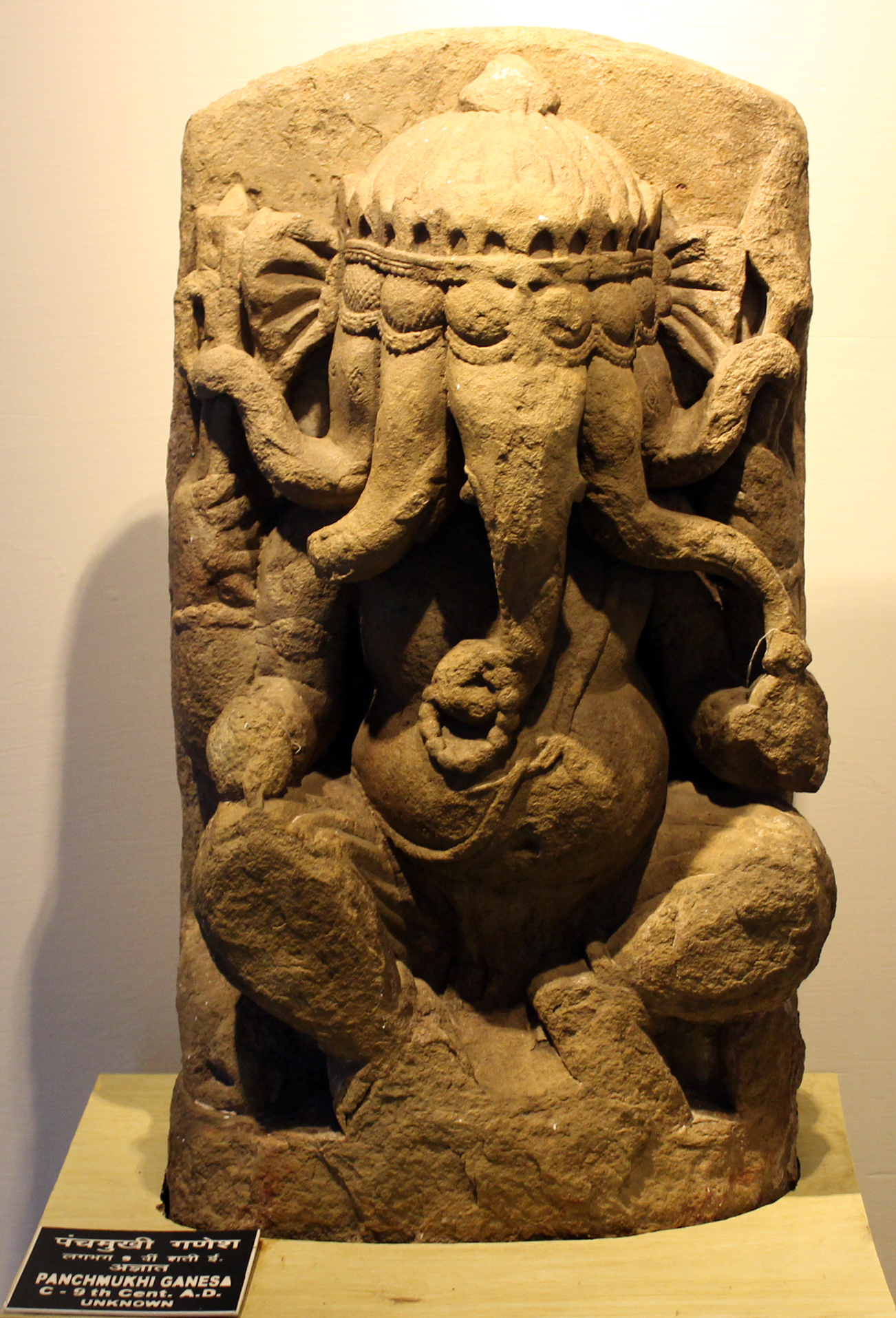
A 5-headed Ganesh statue in the museum

As the state's flagship museum, the State Museum Bhopal aims to present important and representative art and cultural artefacts of Madhya Pradesh. Areas in which the museum holds strong collections are: stone carving and sculpture; coinage and postage stamps; textiles and costumes; documents and epigraphs; medieval arms and armoury; royal collections from princely states; miniature painting and illuminated manuscripts.

=== The galleries ===
Inside the main building, there are seventeen specialised galleries, which are categorised by theme. These are—

Painting and sculptural galleries:

- Miniature painting
- Gallery of Madhya Pradesh sculptural styles (a summary survey gallery)
- Sculpture
- Bronzes (metal sculpture)

Prehistory and antiquity:

- Ancient inscriptions gallery
- Bagh Caves paintings gallery
- Prehistoric and fossils gallery
- Excavated materials gallery

Galleries of cultural and historical collections:

- Archival gallery
- Manuscripts
- Postage stamps and autographs
- Coinage
- Rare musical instruments
- Freedom Movement, housing artefacts associated with India's struggle for independence
- Royal collections
- Costumes
- Weaponry

=== Collection highlights ===
The museum's sculpture collection includes many ancient works, especially from the period of the 8th to 12th centuries. A still older sculptural highlight is the Yakshini (female nature spirits) statues from about 200 BC and a black granite Buddha.

Amongst its antiquities, the museum houses a group of nine rock-cut reproductions of the Buddhist murals from the Bagh Caves, of which some of the originals are now destroyed or lost, as well as 84 rare Jain bronze articles of the 12th century, from the Dhar district of Malwa. Dhar district is in the western side of Madhya Pradesh.

Included in the museum's illuminated manuscript collection are miniature paintings depicting events from the Mahabharata and the Ramayana.

In its postage stamps and autographs gallery, the museum has an example of the first postage stamp of the world, the Penny Black, which was issued in the year 1840.
