= The Librarian (Arcimboldo) =

c. 1566 painting by Giuseppe Arcimboldo

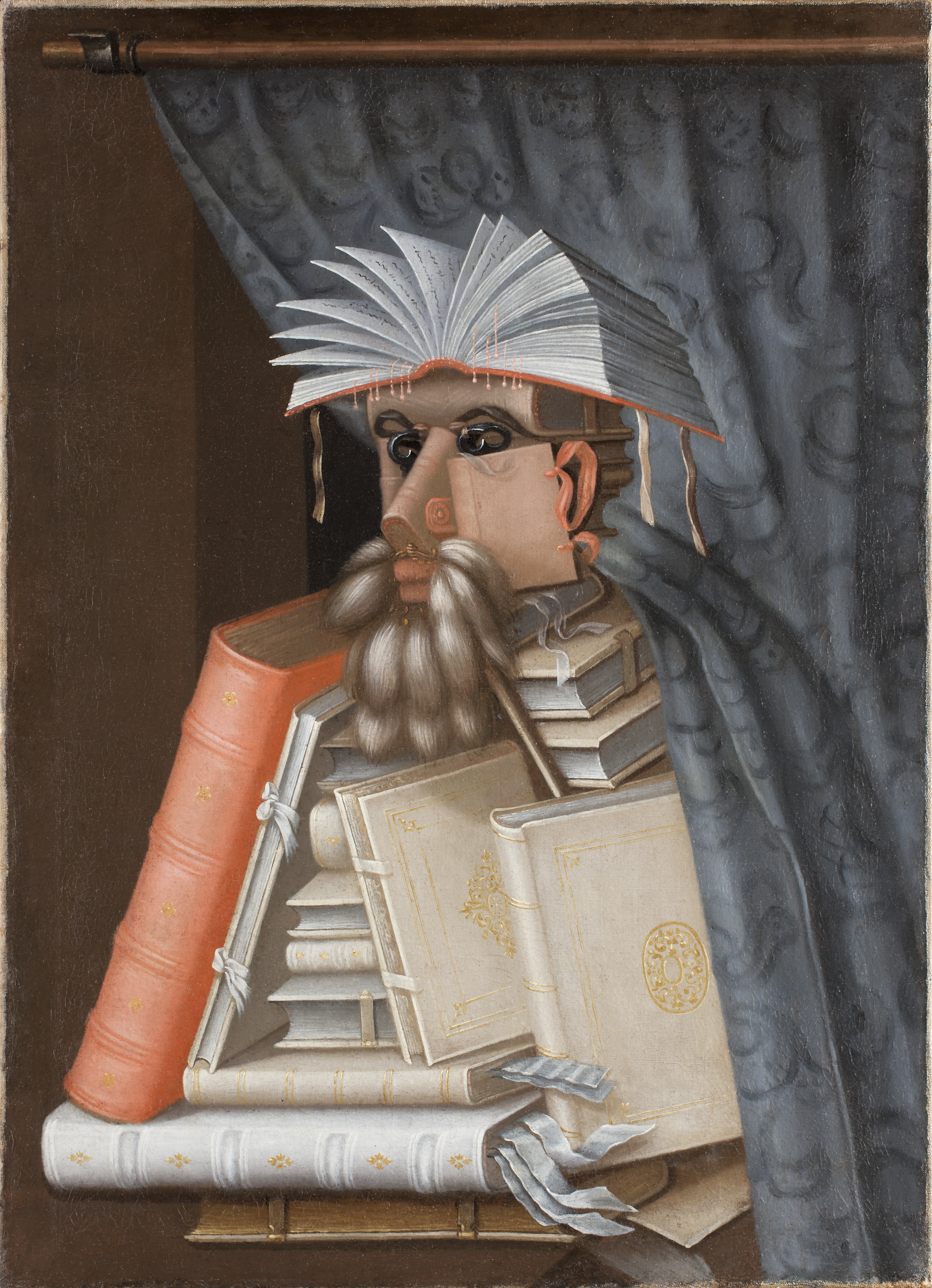
- Artist: Giuseppe Arcimboldo
- Year: c. 1566
- Medium: Oil on canvas
- Dimensions: 97 cm × 71 cm (38 in × 28 in)
- Location: Skokloster Castle, Håbo Municipality
- Accession: 11616

The Librarian is a painting in oils on canvas by the Italian artist Giuseppe Arcimboldo in the collection of Skokloster Castle in Sweden. It is thought to be a portrait of Wolfgang Lazius, a humanist and historian who served Holy Roman Emperors of the House of Habsburg.

Arcimboldo became official portraitist to Emperor Ferdinand I in 1562 and later to Maximilian II and Rudolf II. The Librarian is one of a series of paintings by Arcimboldo of members of Maximilian's entourage. Skokloster Castle dates the painting to 1562, though the painting is more often dated circa 1566.

Arcimboldo created a number of portraits of people by painting an assemblage of objects such as fruits and vegetables, flowers, or in this case, books; the objects typically had some connection to the person's life or depiction. Benno Geiger called it a "triumph of abstract art in the 16th century". In 1957, art historian Sven Alfons was the first to conclude that this was specifically a portrait of Lazius. The work has been interpreted as both a celebration and a satirical mocking of librarians and scholarship. K. C. Elhard suggests an opposing view that it may be specifically a parody of "materialistic book collectors more interested in acquiring books than in reading them." Elhard notes that various references to the librarian's trade are missing from the image, such as any kind of classification marks. He also argues that the painting focuses on the materialistic qualities of the books and not the subject matter, pointing to collectors, and not necessarily librarians or intellectuals.

Elhard notes that The Librarian has become "a fixture in the visual history of the library profession". However, the original title, if any, is unknown, and its current title first appears (in Swedish as "Bibliotekarien") in an early 20th-century inventory.

The Librarian is one of two works by Arcimboldo in the collection of Skokloster Castle (the other being Vertumnus). The painting was brought to Sweden following the looting of Prague Castle by the Swedish army during the 1648 Battle of Prague and was owned by General Hans Christoff von Königsmarck.

There are three other extant versions of the painting whose attributions are uncertain. A scientific study published in 2011 concluded that The Librarian was a later copy of Arcimboldo's original painting, whose whereabouts are unknown.
