= Jan Morris bibliography =

This is a list of the literary works by Welsh writer and historian Jan Morris (1926–2020).

== Non-fiction ==
=== Travel ===
- Coast to Coast (UK: Faber, 1956; US: Pantheon, 1956 as As I Saw the U.S.A.; 1956: winner of the 1957 Cafe Royal Prize)
- Sultan in Oman (UK: Faber, 1957; new edition by Eland in 2008; US: Pantheon, 1957 as Sultan in Oman: Venture in the Middle East)
- The Market of Seleukia (UK: Faber, 1957; US: Pantheon, 1957 as Islam Inflamed: A Middle East Picture)
- South African Winter (UK: Faber, 1958; US: Pantheon, 1958)
- The Hashemite Kings (UK: Faber, 1959; US: Pantheon, 1959)
- Venice (UK: Faber, 1960, rev. ed. 1974, 1983, 1993; US: Harcourt Brace, 1960, rev. ed. 1974, 1995; winner of the 1961 Heinemann Award)
- The Presence of Spain (UK: Faber, 1964, Faber, 1970 as Spain, Faber, 1979 rev. ed. as Spain; US: Harcourt Brace, 1964, Faber, 1979 rev. ed. as Spain, Oxford University Press, 1979 as Spain)
- Oxford (UK: Faber, 1965, Oxford University Press, 1978 rev. ed.; US: Harcourt Brace, 1965, Oxford University Press, 1978 rev. ed.)
- The Great Port: A Passage through New York (US: Harcourt Brace, 1969; UK: Faber, 1970)
- The Venetian Empire: A Sea Voyage (UK: Faber, 1980; US: Harcourt Brace, 1980)
- A Venetian Bestiary (UK: Thames & Hudson, 1982; US: Thames & Hudson, 1982)
- The Matter of Wales: Epic Views of a Small Country (UK: Oxford University Press, 1984; US: Oxford University Press, 1984; Viking, 1998 rev. ed. as Wales: Epic Views of a Small Country )
- Scotland: The Place of Visions with Paul Wakefield (UK: Aurum, 1986; US: Potter, 1986)
- Hong Kong: Xianggang (UK: Viking, 1988, Penguin, 1990 rev. ed. as Hong Kong: Xianggang: The End of an Empire, Penguin, 1993 rev. ed. as Hong Kong: Epilogue to an Empire, Penguin, 1997 rev. ed. as Hong Kong: Epilogue to an Empire; US: Random House, 1988)
- City to City (Canada: Macfarlane Walter & Ross, 1990)
- Ireland: Your Only Place with Paul Wakefield (UK: Aurum, 1990; US: Potter, 1990)
- Sydney (UK: Viking, 1992; US: Random House 1992)
- The Princeship of Wales (UK: Gomer Press, 1995)
- A Writer's World: Travels 1950–2000 (Faber, 2003)
- Contact! Brief Encounters in a Lifetime of Travel (Faber, 2009)

=== Essays ===
- The Bedside Guardian 11: A Selection from the Guardian 1961-1962 (foreword/editor, 1962)
- The Road to Huddersfield: A Journey to Five Continents (US: Pantheon, 1963, Minerva, 1968 as The Road to Huddersfield: The Story of the World Bank; UK: Faber, 1963 as The World Bank. A Prospect)
- The Outriders: A Liberal View of Britain (UK: Faber, 1963)
- Cities (UK: Faber, 1963; US: Harcourt Brace, 1963)
- Places (UK: Faber, 1972; US: Harcourt Brace, 1973)
- Travels (UK: Faber, 1976; US: Harcourt Brace, 1976)
- Destinations: Essays from Rolling Stone (UK: Oxford University Press, 1980; US: Oxford University Press, 1980)
- Wales: The First Place with Paul Wakefield (UK: Aurum, 1982, reprinted 1998; US: Potter, 1982)
- Journeys (UK: Oxford University Press, 1984; US: Oxford University Press, 1984)
- Among the Cities (UK: Viking, 1985, Penguin, 1995 abr. ed. as From the Four Corners; US: Oxford University Press 1985)
- Locations (UK: Oxford University Press, 1992; US: Oxford University Press, 1992)
- O Canada! (UK: Hale, 1992; US: HarperCollins, 1992)
- Contact! A Book of Glimpses (2009)

=== History ===
- The Pax Britannica Trilogy
  - Pax Britannica: The Climax of Empire (UK: Faber, 1968; US: Harcourt Brace, 1968).
  - Heaven’s Command: An Imperial Progress (UK: Faber, 1973; US: Harcourt Brace, 1974). Covering the period 1837 to 1897
  - Farewell the Trumpets: An Imperial Retreat (UK: Faber, 1978; US: Harcourt Brace, 1978). Covering the period 1897 to 1965
- The Spectacle of Empire: Style, Effect and the Pax Britannica (UK: Faber, 1982; US: Faber, 1982, Doubleday, 1982)
- Stones of Empire: The Buildings of the Raj (UK: Oxford University Press, 1983; US: Oxford University Press, 1983) (with photographs by Simon Winchester)
- Battleship Yamato: Of War, Beauty and Irony (Pallas Athene, 2018)

=== Biography ===
- Fisher’s Face, or, Getting to Know the Admiral (UK: Viking, 1995; US: Random House, 1995)
- Lincoln: A Foreigner's Quest (Viking, 1999)

=== Memoirs ===
- Conundrum (UK: Faber, 1974; US: Harcourt Brace, 1974) (personal narrative of Jan Morris's gender transition)
- Pleasures of a Tangled Life (UK: Barrie & Jenkins, 1989; US: Random House, 1989)
- Trieste and the Meaning of Nowhere (Faber, 2001)
- A Writer's House in Wales (National Geographic, 2002)
- In My Mind's Eye: A Thought Diary (Faber, 2018)
- Thinking Again (Faber, 2020)

=== Other ===
- Coronation Everest (UK: Faber, 1958; US: Dutton, 1958)
- The Preachers (US: St. Martin's Press, 1973)
- Ciao, Carpaccio! An Infatuation (Pallas Athene, 2014)
- Allegorizings (Faber, 2021) posthumously published

== Fiction ==
=== Novels for adults ===
- Last Letters from Hav (UK: Viking, 1985; US: Random House, 1985; shortlisted for the 1985 Booker Prize for Fiction)
- A Machynlleth Triad with Twm Morys (UK: Gwasg Gregynog, 1993, Viking, 1993, Viking 1994 enl. ed. as A Machynlleth Triad = Triawd Machynlleth; US: Viking, 1993, Viking 1994 enl. ed. as A Machynlleth Triad = Triawd Machynlleth)
- Our First Leader: A Welsh Fable (Gomer Press, 2000) – a satirical uchronia set during World War II.
- Hav: A Novel (Faber, 2006, an edition of Last Letters from Hav with a new introduction and concluding section entitled "Hav of the Myrmidons". Shortlisted for the 2007 Arthur C Clarke Award).

=== Children's books ===
- The Upstairs Donkey, and Other Stolen Stories with Pauline Baynes (UK: Faber, 1962; US: Pantheon, 1962)

== As editor ==
- The Oxford Book of Oxford (UK: Oxford University Press, 1978; US: Oxford University Press, 1978)
- My Favourite Stories of Wales (UK: Lutterworth Press, 1980)
- Ruskin, John, The Stones of Venice (UK: Faber, 1981; US: Brown, 1981, Faber, 1981)
- The Small Oxford Book of Wales (UK: Oxford University Press, 1982; US: Oxford University Press, 1982)
- Travels with Virginia Woolf (UK: Hogarth Press, 1993)

== Miscellaneous ==
- Manhattan '45 (UK: Faber, 1987; US: Faber, 1987, Oxford University Press 1987)
- Over Europe (UK: Times Books, 1991; US: Mallard, 1992) – Jan Morris provided the text for this post-Cold War photographic project
- Fifty Years of Europe: An Album (UK: Viking, 1997; US: Villard, 1997) – published in 2006 as Europe – An Intimate Journey
- Thrilling Cities written by Ian Fleming. Jan Morris provided the introduction for the 2009 edition published by Ian Fleming Publications.

== Booklets and pamphlets ==
- The Story of the British Everest Expedition (Everest colour supplement, The Times, 1953)
- South America (The Guardian, 1961 or 1962)
- James Morris in Australia (The Guardian, 1963)
- Christ Church Oxford: A Brief History and Guide with James Ferguson (Christ Church, 2011)
- Portmeirion (Portmeirion Ltd., 2012)
