= Conundrum =

Conundrum may refer to:

- A riddle, whose answer is or involves a pun or unexpected twist, in particular
  - Riddle joke, a riddle that constitutes a set-up to the humorous punch line of a joke
- A logical postulation that evades resolution, an intricate and difficult problem.

== Literature ==
- Conundrum (Lyons novel), a 1994 Doctor Who novel by Steve Lyons
- Conundrum (Dragonlance novel), a 2001 Dragonlance fantasy novel by Jeff Crook
- Conundrum (Morris memoir), a memoir written by Jan Morris
- Conundrum Press (disambiguation), two book publishing companies in North America

== Other fields ==
- "Conundrum" (song), an instrumental song by Jethro Tull on their album Bursting Out
- "Conundrum" (Dallas), the two-hour series finale of primetime soap opera Dallas
- "Conundrum" (Star Trek: The Next Generation), a 1992 fifth-season episode of Star Trek: The Next Generation
- The Conundrum, a mountain unicycle made by Surly Bikes
- Conundrum, an NSA code word for Chrononaut Frank B. Parker in the television series Seven Days
- HMS Conundrum, the unofficial name of floating drums used to lay undersea oil pipelines between England and France during World War II

== See also ==
- Hidden faces, the perception or recognition of faces in something essentially different
- Mechanical puzzle, a puzzle presented as a set of mechanically interlinked pieces
  - Disentanglement puzzle, a type of mechanical puzzle that involves disentangling one piece or set of pieces
