= List of fictional city-states in literature =

This is a list of fictional city-states in literature. A city-state is a sovereign state that consists of a city and its dependent territories. They have been an important aspect of human society, and historically included famous cities like Athens, Carthage, Rome, and the Italian city-states of the Renaissance. Correspondingly in literature, there are numerous examples of fictional city-states.

== A-I ==
- Academy City, also known as Gakuen Toshi, is a landlocked sovereign city-state within the Tokyo Metropolitan Area. It is the main setting of the Japanese light novel series A Certain Magical Index and A Certain Scientific Railgun.
- Amber, a castle and city in The Chronicles of Amber, a series by Roger Zelazny.
- Ankh-Morpork, which features prominently in the Discworld series by Terry Pratchett.
- Aramanth, a city where personal freedoms do not exist and success depends solely on performance in compulsory examinations, in the Wind on Fire trilogy by William Nicholson.
- Besźel, one of the eponymous twinned city-states in China Miéville's novel The City & the City.
- Braavos, Pentos, and other Free Cities from the A Song of Ice and Fire book series by George R. R. Martin.
- Caprona, a sovereign city-state in the world of the Chronicles of Chrestomanci series by Diana Wynne Jones. It is the setting for The Magicians of Caprona.
- Cities in Flight by James Blish are Earth cities which though the invention of the Spindizzy are able to take off into space, leaving an impoverished Earth behind, and wander the galaxy as independent "okie" cities.
- Columbia (Bioshock: Infinite)
- Cynosure (First Comics multiverse)
- Diaspar in The City and the Stars by Arthur C. Clarke
- Duchy of Grand Fenwick in The Mouse that Roared by Leonard Wibberley
- Dungeons & Dragons campaigns
  - Free City of Greyhawk
  - Menzoberranzan (Forgotten Realms)
  - Neverwinter (Forgotten Realms)
  - Sigil (Planescape)
  - Waterdeep (Forgotten Realms)
- Kharé, Port Blacksand (Fighting Fantasy series by Steve Jackson)
- Esgaroth (Laketown), Lonely Mountain (The Hobbit by J.R.R. Tolkien)
- Esterberg A city-state located in Central Europe where humans live alongside anomalies. (SCP Foundation website)
- Eurtec A cyberpunk city located somewhere in Europe, serving as a global hub for paratechnology. (SCP Foundation website)
- Hav (Last Letters from Hav by Jan Morris, 1985)

== J-R ==
- Jonathanland, the fictional city in the Jonathanland Universe franchise, where Baby Madison, Eli Tilmann, and others live.
- Judge Dredd comic book series
  - Brit-Cit
  - Ciudad Baranquilla
  - Hondo City
  - Mega-City One
  - Mega-City Two
- Lys in The City and the Stars by Arthur C. Clarke
- New Crobuzon (Books by China Miéville)
- New New York (The novel Do Androids Dream of Electric Sheep? by Philip K. Dick, Worlds trilogy by Joe Haldeman)
- New Vegas, Independent city state in Fallout: New Vegas
- Neustern, autonomous coastal city state invented in the paintings of artist Gary Farrelly.
- Solymbria, Boaktis, Tarxia, Zolon, Ir, Metouro, Govannion, Alissar, Xylar, Othomae, Kortoli, Vindium (all sharing a common language and culture but jealous of their independence and greatly differing in their systems of government), and Iraz (a distant, non-Novarian city state in the same world, with a different language and culture) in the Novarian series by L. Sprague de Camp:
- Orsenna (fictional city in The Opposing Shore by Julien Gracq)
- Opar ("Lost" city in the African jungles, in the Tarzan books of Edgar Rice Burroughs, its ancient days of glory described in prequel series by Philip José Farmer)
- Pseudopolis, city-state on the Sto Plains in the Discworld series.
- The Riftwar Cycle by Raymond E. Feist
  - The Free Cities of Natal on the continent of Triagia on Midkemia
  - Krondor, a principality

== S-Z ==
- Actual Sitka, AK, US with a fictional population in the millions and the host of a 1977 world fair, in Michael Chabon's alternate history detective novel "The Yiddish Policemen's Union"
- The Begum's Fortune by Jules Verne
  - Stahlstadt (Steel City), a totalitarian German-speaking city-state
  - Ville-France, a utopian French-speaking city-state
- Superbia (mobile city-state in the DC Comics universe)
- Three Portlands, an extradimensional city-state accessible via portals in Portland, Oregon, Portland, Maine, and the Isle of Portland (SCP Foundation website)
- Ul Qoma, one of the eponymous twinned city-states in China Miéville's novel The City & the City
- Umbar (from The Lord of the Rings by J.R.R. Tolkien)
- The Vesani Republic from The Folding Knife by K.J. Parker
- Ys (from John Brunner's Traveller in Black)
