= City-state =

Sovereign state consisting primarily of a city and its territory

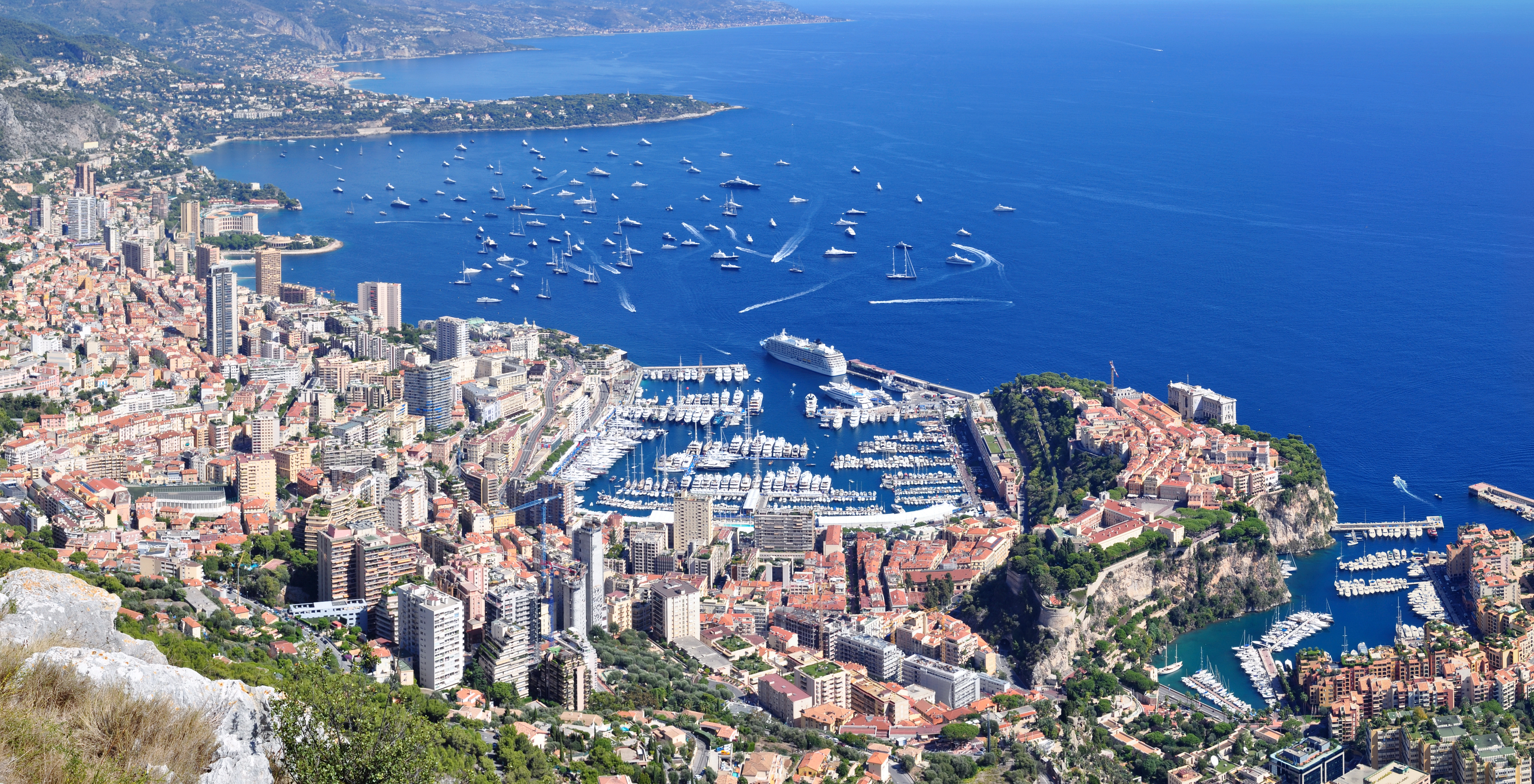
Monaco is a city state located on the Mediterranean and the second smallest country in the world (after the Vatican, another city state)

A city-state is an independent city that encompasses the totality of its sovereign territory. This concept stands in contrast to that of a regular state or country, which typically encompasses a capital city and additional urban centers, in addition to the countryside. Throughout history, numerous city-states have emerged in various regions of the world, including prominent examples such as Rome, Carthage, Athens, and Sparta, as well as the Italian city-states that flourished during the Medieval and Renaissance periods, such as Florence, Venice, Genoa, and Milan.

With the rise of nation states worldwide, there remains some disagreement on the number of modern city-states that still exist; Singapore, Monaco and Vatican City are the candidates most commonly discussed. Out of these, Singapore is the largest and most populous city-state in the world, with full sovereignty, international borders, its own currency, a robust military, and substantial international influence in its own right. The Economist refers to it as the "world's only fully functioning city-state".

Several non-sovereign cities enjoy a high degree of autonomy and are often considered to be city-states, such as Hong Kong and Macau. Cities of the United Arab Emirates, most notably Dubai, have been cited in similar terms. Additionally, certain non-sovereign overseas territories, such as Gibraltar, are also sometimes called city-states.

== Historical background ==
=== Ancient and medieval world ===
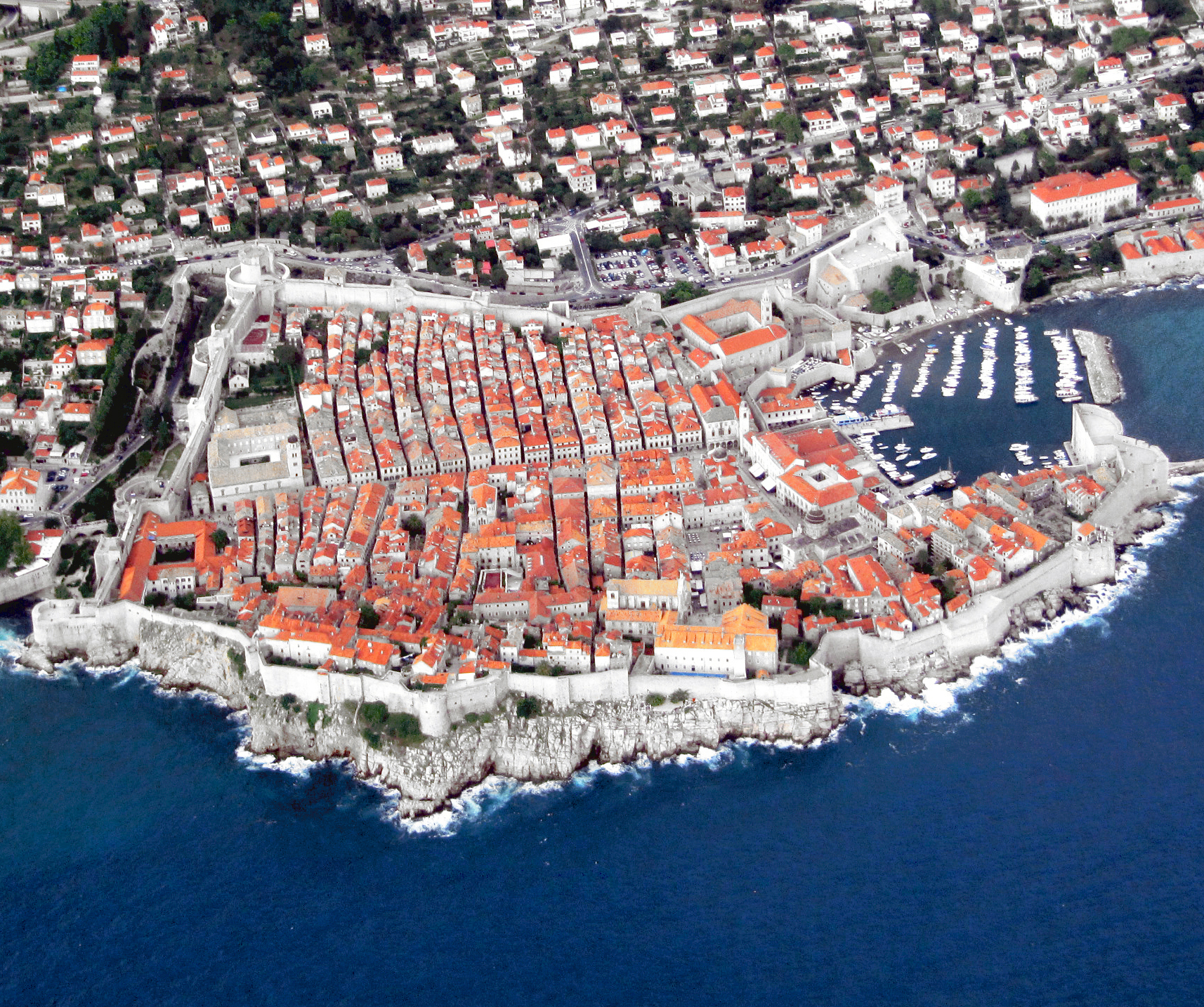
The Republic of Ragusa, a maritime city-state, was based in the walled city of Dubrovnik.

Historical city-states included Sumerian cities such as Uruk, Ur and Nippur; Ancient Egyptian city-states, such as Thebes and Memphis; the Phoenician cities (such as Tyre and Sidon); the five Philistine city-states; the Berber city-states of the Garamantes; the city-states of ancient Greece (the poleis such as Athens, Sparta, Thebes, and Corinth); the Roman Republic (which grew from a city-state into a vast empire); the Italian city-states from the Middle Ages to the early modern period, such as Florence, Siena, Ferrara, Milan (which as they grew in power began to dominate neighboring cities) and Genoa and Venice, which became powerful thalassocracies; the Mayan and other cultures of pre-Columbian Mesoamerica (including cities such as Chichen Itza, Tikal, Copán and Monte Albán); the central Asian cities along the Silk Road; the city-states of the Swahili coast; Ragusa and Poljica in Croatia; Tbilisi in Georgia; the medieval Russian city-states of Novgorod and Pskov; the free imperial cities of German-speaking Europe; mueang of Indochina; barangay states of the Philippines; and many others. Danish historian Poul Holm has classed the Viking colonial cities in medieval Ireland, most importantly the Kingdom of Dublin, as city-states.

In Cyprus, the Phoenician settlement of Kition (in present-day Larnaca) was a city-state that existed from around 800 BC until the end of the 4th century BC.

Some of the best-known examples of city-state culture in human history are the ancient Greek city-states and the merchant city-states of Renaissance Italy, which organised themselves as independent centers. The success of regional units coexisting as autonomous actors in loose geographical and cultural unity, as in Italy and Greece, often prevented their amalgamation into larger national units. However, such small political entities often survived only for short periods because they lacked the resources to defend themselves against incursions by larger states (such as Roman conquest of Greece). Thus they inevitably gave way to larger organisations of society, including the empire and the nation-state.

=== Central Europe ===
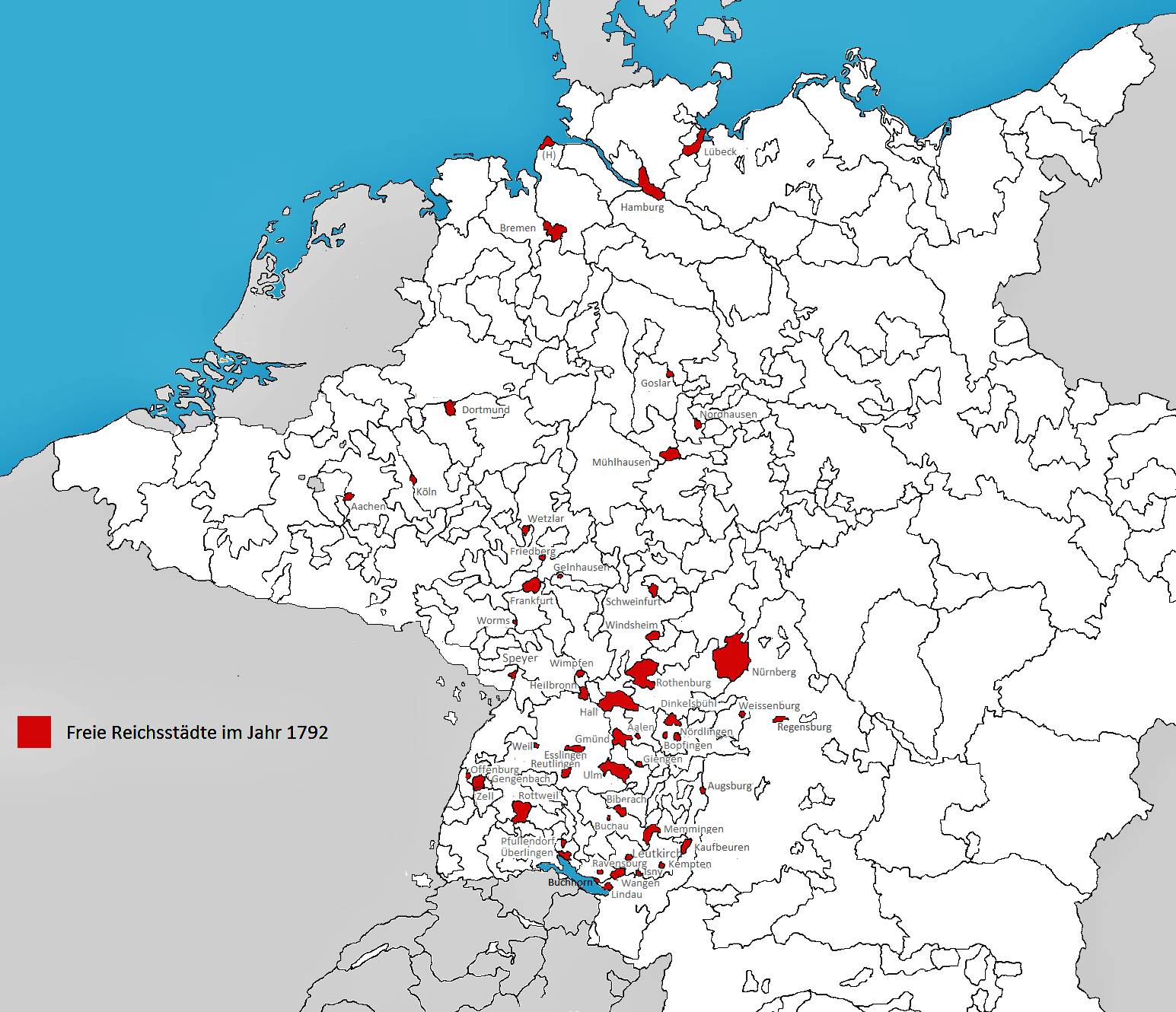
The Free imperial cities as of 1792

In the Holy Roman Empire (962–1806) more than 80 Free Imperial Cities came to enjoy considerable autonomy in the Middle Ages and in early modern times, buttressed legally by international law following the Peace of Westphalia of 1648. Some, like three of the earlier Hanseatic cities – Bremen, Hamburg and Lübeck – pooled their economic relations with foreign powers and were able to wield considerable diplomatic clout. Individual cities often made protective alliances with other cities or with neighbouring regions, including the Hanseatic League (1358 – 17th century), the Swabian League of Cities (1331–1389), the Décapole (1354–1679) in the Alsace, or the Old Swiss Confederacy (c. 1300 – 1798). The Swiss cantons of Zürich, Bern, Lucerne, Fribourg, Solothurn, Basel, Schaffhausen, and Geneva originated as city-states.

After the dissolution of the Holy Roman Empire in 1806, some cities – then members of different confederacies – officially became sovereign city-states, such as the Free Hanseatic City of Bremen (1806–11 and again 1813–71), the Free City of Frankfurt upon Main (1815–66), the Free and Hanseatic City of Hamburg (1806–11 and again 1814–71), the Free and Hanseatic City of Lübeck (1806–11 and again 1813–71), and the Free City of Kraków (1815–1846). Under Habsburg rule the city of Fiume had the status of a corpus separatum (1779–1919), which – while falling short of an independent sovereignty – had many attributes of a city-state.

=== Italy ===
Italy in 1494, after the Peace of Lodi

In Northern and Central Italy during the medieval and Renaissance periods, city-states – with various amounts of associated land – became the standard form of polity. Some of them, despite being de facto independent states, were formally part of the Holy Roman Empire. The era of the Italian states, in particular from the 11th to the 15th centuries, featured remarkable economic development, trade, manufacture, and mercantile capitalism, together with increasing urbanization, with remarkable influence throughout much of the Mediterranean world and Europe as a whole. During this time, most of the Italian city-states were ruled by one person, such as the Signoria or by a dynasty, such as the House of Gonzaga and the House of Sforza.

==== Examples of Italian city-states during the Middle Ages and the Renaissance ====
- Republic of Florence, Duchy of Milan, Duchy of Ferrara, San Marino, Duchy of Modena and Reggio, Duchy of Urbino, Duchy of Mantua and the Republic of Lucca.
- The powerful maritime republics: Republic of Venice, Republic of Genoa, Republic of Amalfi, Republic of Pisa, Republic of Ancona and Duchy of Gaeta.

=== Southeast Asia ===
In the history of Mainland Southeast Asia, aristocratic groups, Buddhist leaders, and others organized settlements into autonomous or semi-autonomous city-states. These were referred to as mueang, and were usually related in a tributary relationship now described as mandala or as over-lapping sovereignty, in which smaller city-states paid tribute to larger ones that paid tribute to still larger ones – until reaching the apex in cities like Ayutthaya, Bagan, Bangkok and others that served as centers of Southeast Asian royalty. The system existed until the 19th century, when colonization by European powers occurred. Siam, a regional power at the time, needed to define their territories for negotiation with the European powers so the Siamese government established a nation-state system, incorporated their tributary cities (Lan Xang, Cambodia and some Malay cities) into their territory and abolished the mueang and the tributary system.

In early Philippine history, the barangay was a complex sociopolitical unit which scholars have historically considered the dominant organizational pattern among the various peoples of the Philippine archipelago. These sociopolitical units were sometimes also referred to as barangay states, but are more properly referred to using the technical term polity. Evidence suggests a considerable degree of independence as city states ruled by Datus, Rajahs and Sultans. Early chroniclers record that the name evolved from the term balangay, which refers to a plank boat widely used by various cultures of the Philippine archipelago prior to the arrival of European colonizers.

=== 20th-century cities under international supervision ===
==== Danzig ====
The Free City of Danzig was a semi-autonomous city-state that existed between 1920 and 1939, consisting of the Baltic Sea port of Danzig (now Gdańsk, Poland) and nearly 200 towns in the surrounding areas. It was created on 15 November 1920 under the terms of Article 100 (Section XI of Part III) of the 1919 Treaty of Versailles after the end of World War I.

==== Fiume ====
After a prolonged period where the city of Fiume enjoyed considerable autonomy under Habsburg rule (see Corpus separatum (Fiume)), the Free State of Fiume was proclaimed as a fully independent free state which existed between 1920 and 1924. Its territory of 28 km^{2} (11 sq mi) comprised the city of Fiume (now in Croatia and, since the end of World War II, known as Rijeka, both names meaning "river" in the respective languages) and rural areas to its north, with a corridor to its west connecting it to Italy.

==== Jerusalem ====
Under the United Nations Partition Plan for Palestine of 1947, Mandatory Palestine was to be partitioned into three states: a Jewish state of Israel, an Arab state of Palestine, and a corpus separatum (Latin for "separated body") consisting of a Jerusalem city-state under the control of United Nations Trusteeship Council. Although the plan had some international support and the UN accepted this proposal (and still officially holds the stance that Jerusalem should be held under this regime), implementation of the plan failed as the 1948 Palestine war broke out with the 1947–48 Civil War in Mandatory Palestine, ultimately resulting in Jerusalem being split into West Jerusalem and East Jerusalem. Israel would eventually gain control of East Jerusalem in the Six-Day War in 1967.

==== Memel ====
The Klaipėda Region or Memel Territory was defined by the Treaty of Versailles in 1920 when it was put under the administration of the Council of Ambassadors. The Memel Territory was to remain under the control of the League of Nations until a future day when the people of the region would be allowed to vote on whether the land would return to Germany or not. The then predominantly ethnic German Memel Territory (Prussian Lithuanians and Memellanders constituted the other ethnic groups), situated between the river and the town of that name, was occupied by Lithuania in the Klaipėda Revolt of 1923.

==== Ottoman ====
Some proposals for the partition of the Ottoman Empire envisaged international zones at Istanbul/Constantinople or the wider Turkish straits, and possibly also at İzmir/Smyrna. Although the allies of World War I occupied both after the 1918 Armistice of Mudros, the British-led occupation of Istanbul recognised Turkey as de jure sovereign, while the Greek occupation of Smyrna was an attempted annexation. The 1923 Treaty of Lausanne re-established Turkish control of both areas.

==== Shanghai ====
The Shanghai International Settlement (1845–1943) was an international zone with its own legal system, postal service, and currency.

==== Tangier ====
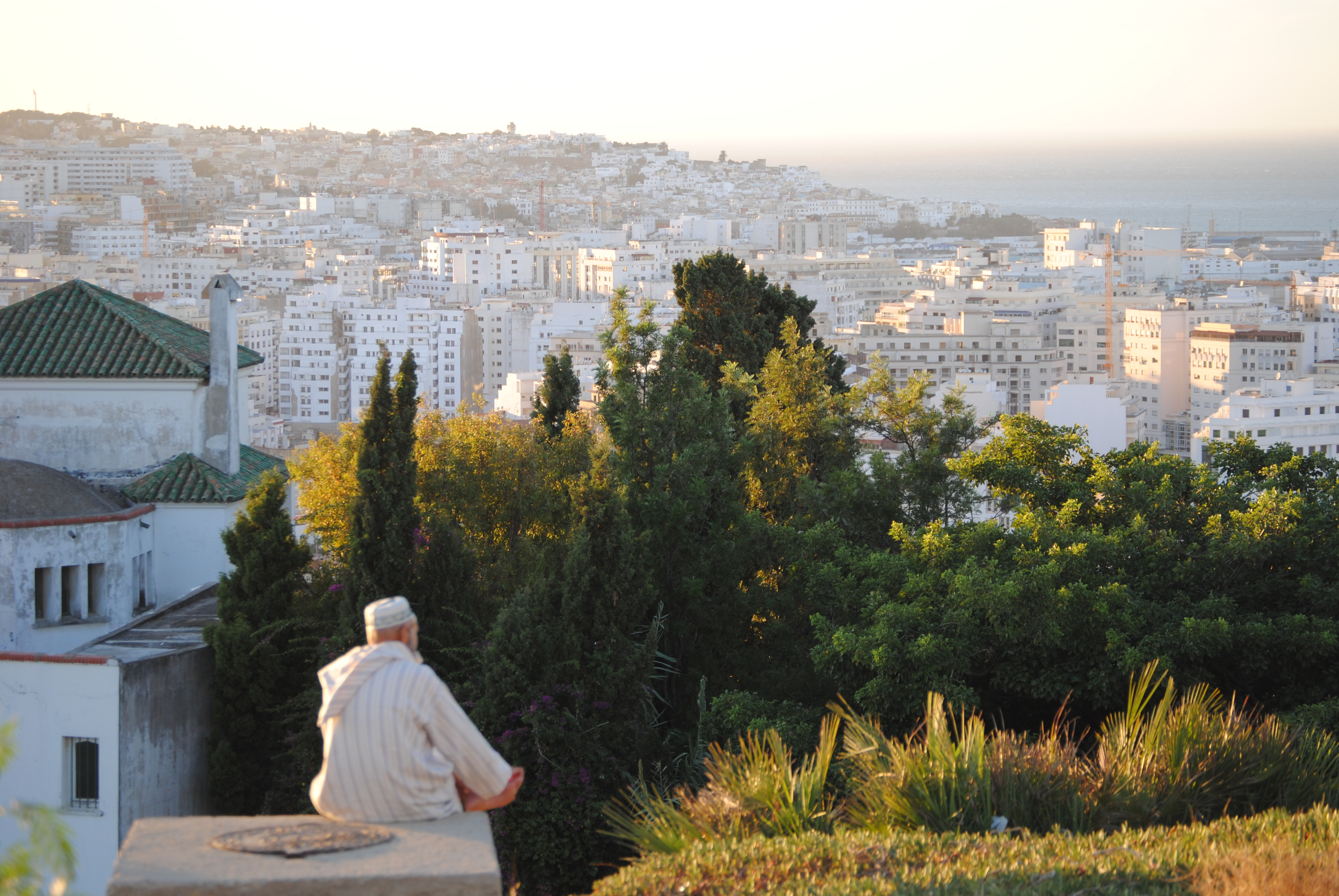
Tangier

The international zone within the city of Tangier, in North Africa was approximately 373 km^{2} (144 sq mi). It was at first under the joint administration of France, Spain, and the United Kingdom, plus later Portugal, Italy, Belgium, the Netherlands, Sweden, and the United States. The international zone was initially attached to Morocco. It then became a French-Spanish protectorate from 1923 until 29 October 1956, when it was reintegrated into the state of Morocco.

==== Trieste ====
The Free Territory of Trieste was an independent territory situated in Central Europe between northern Italy and Yugoslavia, facing the north part of the Adriatic Sea, under direct responsibility of the United Nations Security Council in the aftermath of World War II, from 1947 to 1954.

==== West Berlin ====
In the 20th century West Berlin, though lacking sovereignty, functioned from 1948 until 1990 as a state legally not belonging to any other state, but ruled by the Western Allies. They allowed – notwithstanding their overlordship as occupant powers – its internal organisation as one state simultaneously being a city, officially called Berlin (West). Though West Berlin maintained close ties to the West German Federal Republic, it never legally formed a part of it.

== Contemporary sovereign city-states ==
=== Vatican City ===
Vatican City, a city-state well known for being the smallest country in the world

Until September 1870, the city of Rome had been controlled by the pope as part of his Papal States. When King Victor Emmanuel II seized the city in 1870, Pope Pius IX refused to recognize the newly formed Kingdom of Italy.

Because he could not travel without effectively acknowledging the authority of the king, Pius IX and his successors each claimed to be a "Prisoner in the Vatican", unable to leave the 0.49 km^{2} (0.19 sq mi) papal enclave once they had ascended the papal throne.

The impasse was resolved in 1929 by the Lateran Treaties negotiated by the Italian dictator Benito Mussolini between King Victor Emmanuel III and Pope Pius XI. Under this treaty, Vatican City was recognized as an independent state, with the Pope as its head. The Vatican City State has its own citizenship, diplomatic corps, flag, and postage stamps. With a population of fewer than 1,000 (mostly clergymen), it is by far the smallest sovereign country in the world.

=== Monaco ===
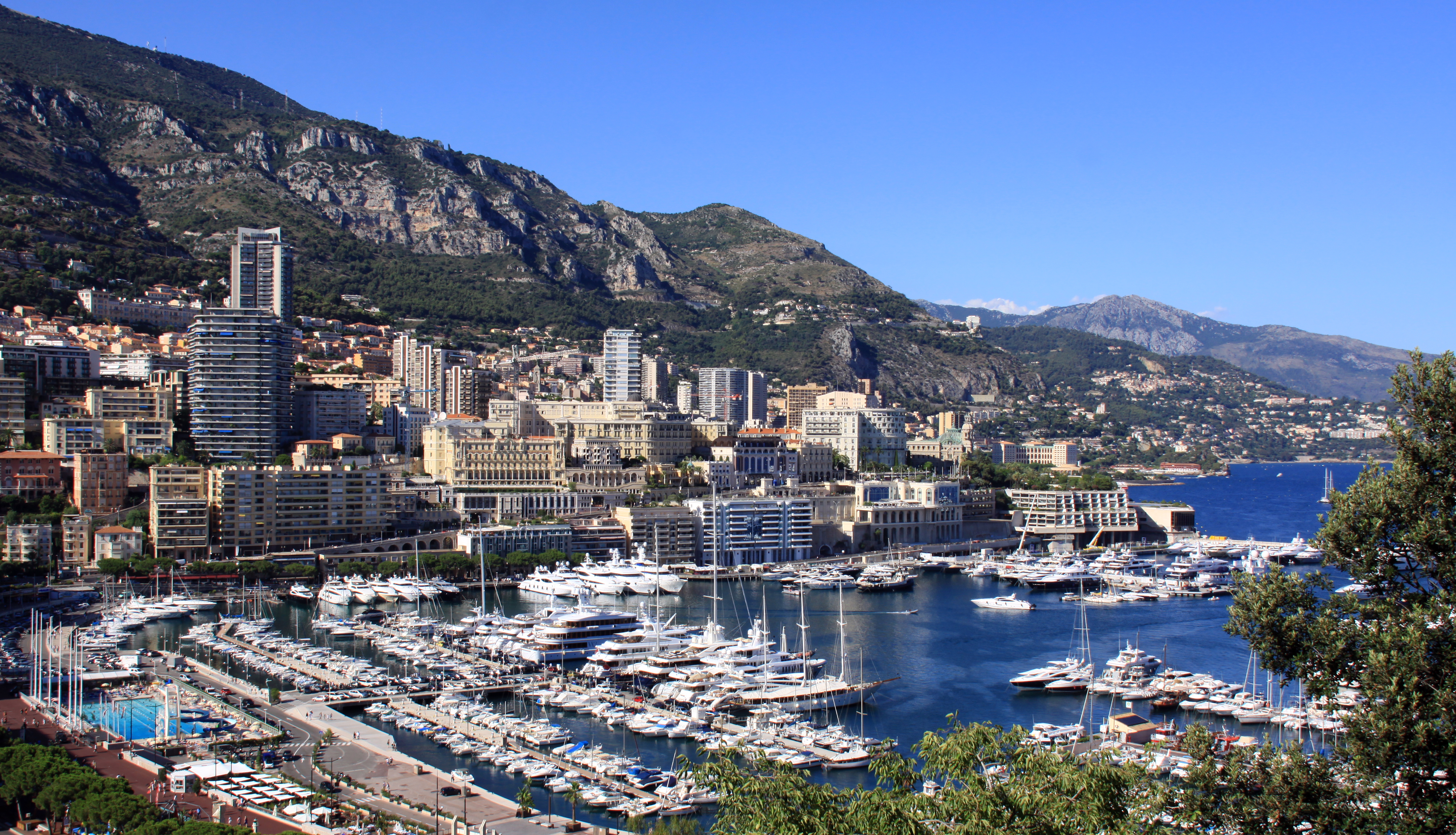
Monaco, known for its casino, royalty and scenic harbour

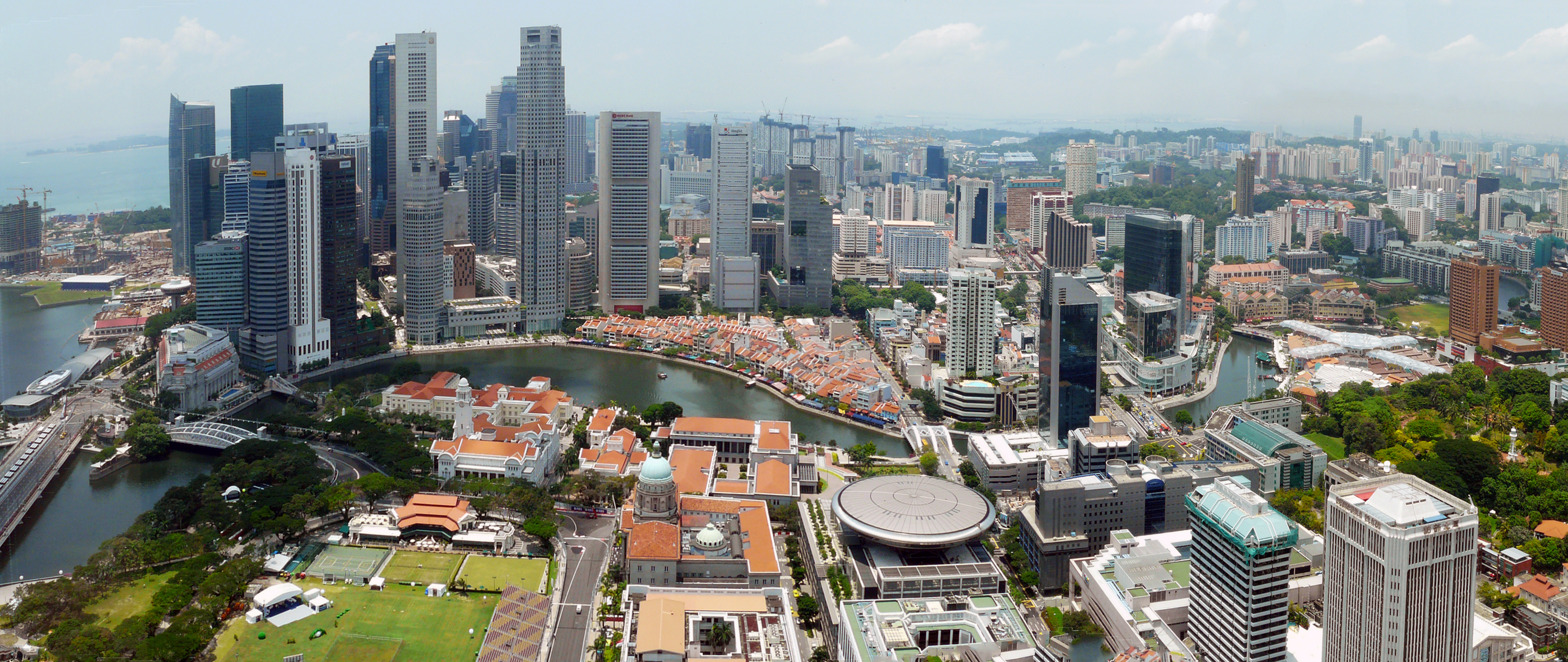
Singapore, modern city-state and island country

The Principality of Monaco is a very small independent city-state bordering France. Monaco-Ville (the ancient fortified city) and Monaco's well-known area Monte Carlo are districts of a continuous urban zone, not distinct cities, though they were three separate municipalities (communes) until 1917. The Principality of Monaco and the City of Monaco (each having specific powers) govern the same territory. Though they maintain a small military, largely for ceremonial purposes, they would still have to rely on France for defence in the face of an aggressive power.

=== Singapore ===
Singapore is an island city-state in Southeast Asia bordering Malaysia to the north and Indonesia to the south. 6 million people live and work within 728.3 square kilometres (281.2 sq mi), making Singapore the 2nd-most-densely populated country in the world after Monaco. Singapore was part of the Federation of Malaysia for two years before it seceded from the federation in 1965, becoming an independent republic, a city and a sovereign country. The Economist refers to the nation as the "world's only fully functioning city-state". In particular, it has its own currency, a large commercial airport, one of the busiest trans-shipment maritime ports in the world, and fully fledged armed forces to safeguard the nation's sovereignty against potential regional aggressors. Singapore is also referred to as the only island city-state in the world by WorldAtlas.

== Contemporary non-sovereign city-states ==
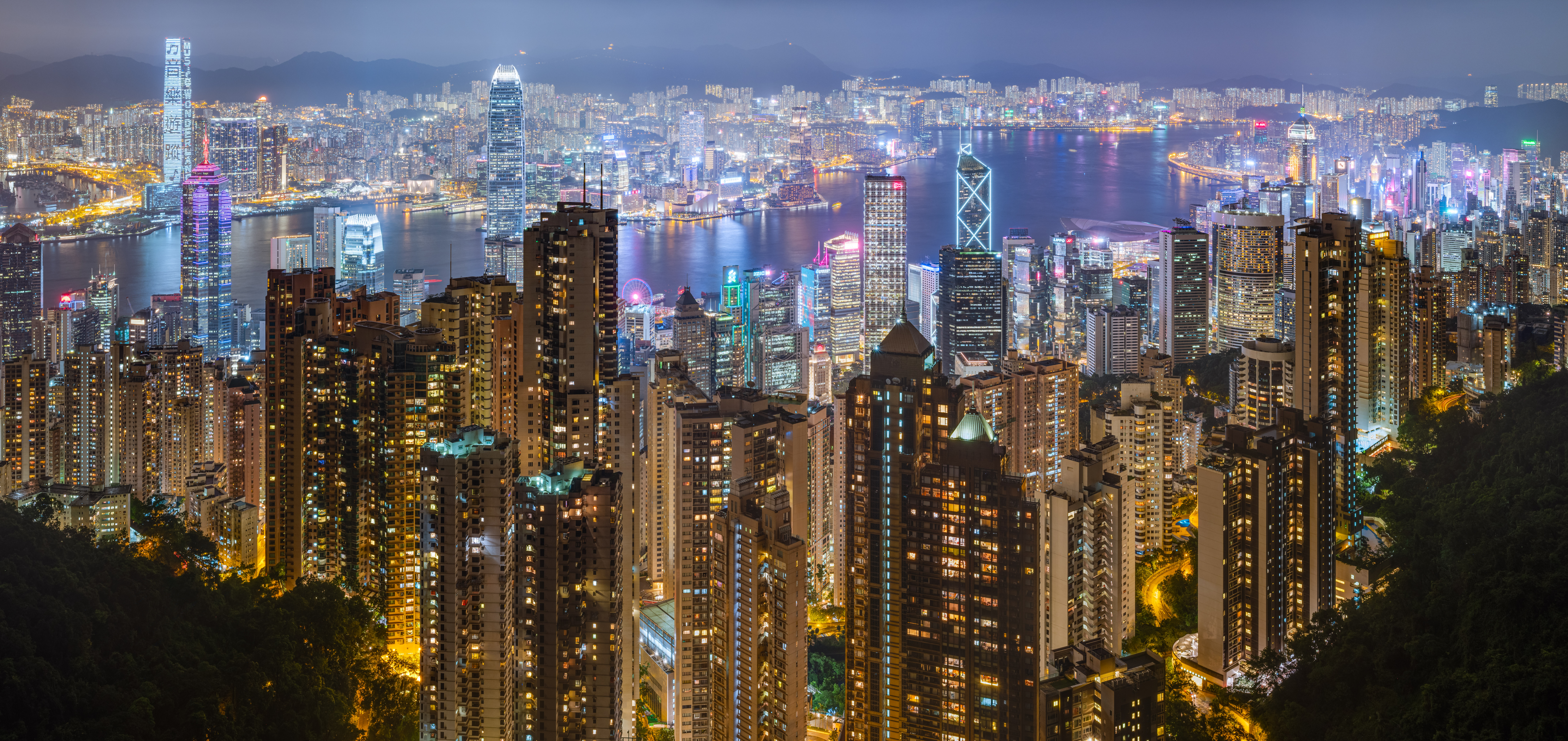
The city of Hong Kong enjoys a high degree of autonomy, and is sometimes considered a city-state.

Some cities or urban areas, while not sovereign states, may nevertheless be constituent states of a federation, or enjoy a high degree of autonomy. As such, they function as "city-states" within the context of the sovereign state to which they belong. Historian Mogens Herman Hansen describes this aspect of self-government as: "The city-state is a self-governing, but not necessarily independent, political unit." A city with more limited self-government may be referred to as an independent city.

Some non-sovereign cities which have a high degree of autonomy, and have been described as city-states, include:

- Spain: Ceuta and Melilla (as autonomous cities)
- Armenia: Yerevan (as an autonomous city)
- China: Hong Kong and Macau (as special administrative regions)
- South Korea: Sejong (as a self governing city)
- United Kingdom: Gibraltar (as a British Overseas Territory)
- United States: Washington, D.C. (as a federal district)

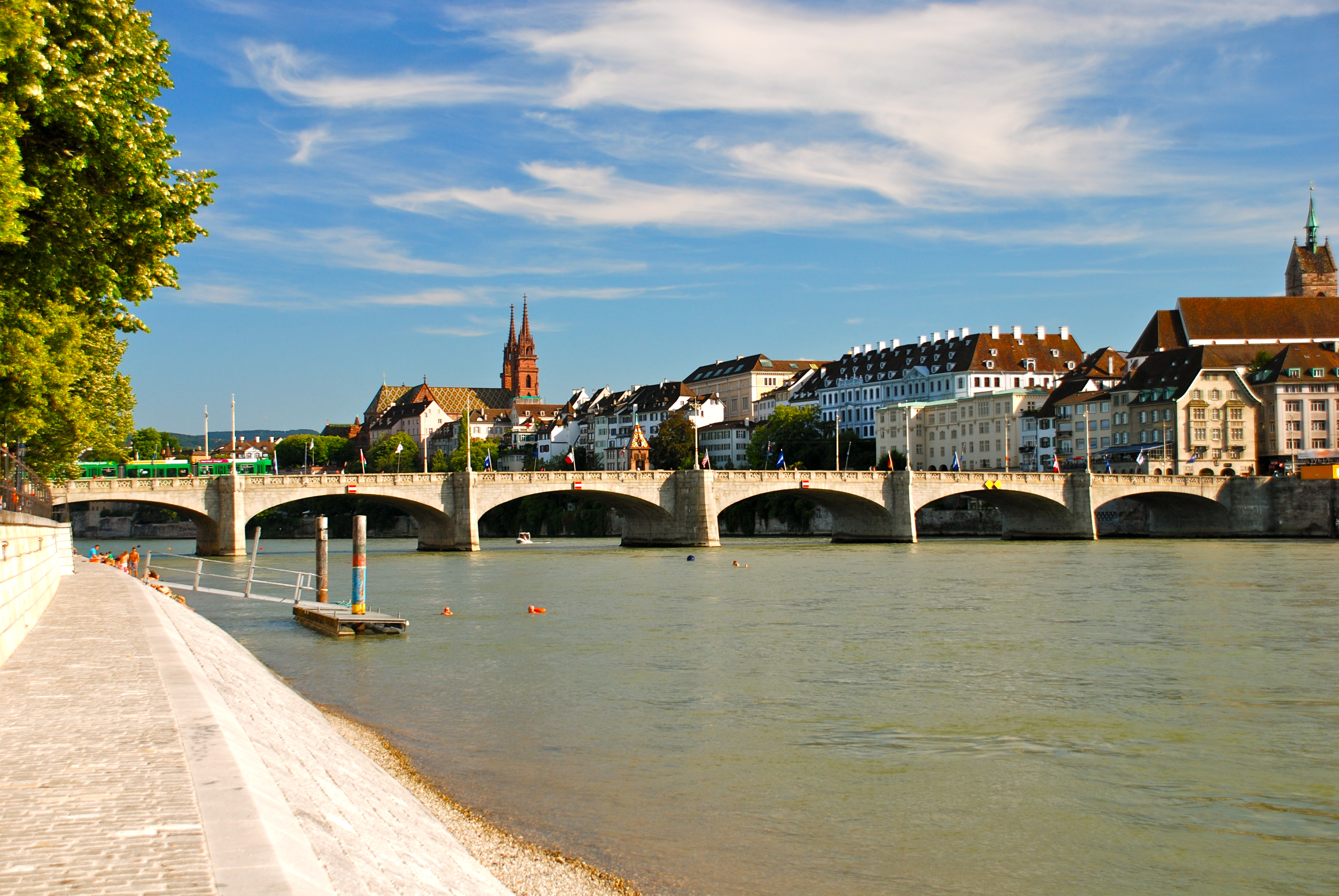
The city of Basel, located on the Rhine, is a historic city-state and a Swiss canton.

Some cities that are constituent states in a federation, and as such can be accurately described as non-sovereign city-states with a high degree of autonomy, include:

- Argentina: Buenos Aires
- Austria: Vienna
- Belgium: Brussels
- Brazil: Brasília
- Germany: Bremen, Berlin and Hamburg
- Nigeria: Lagos
- Mexico: Mexico City
- Malaysia: Malacca, Penang
- Russia: Moscow, Saint Petersburg, and Sevastopol (disputed)
- Switzerland: Basel-Stadt and Geneva

== States with similar characteristics ==
A number of other small states share many of these characteristics, and are sometimes cited as modern city-states. Luxembourg, Djibouti, Qatar, Brunei, Kuwait, Bahrain, and Malta are each politically and economically centered on a single city; in the cases of Luxembourg, Djibouti and Kuwait, this primate city is so dominant as to give its name to the country. These countries are distinct from true city-states such as Singapore in that they comprise both their primate city (such as Luxembourg City) and a number of peripheral cities and towns (such as Esch-sur-Alzette and ten other towns in Luxembourg) with autonomous municipal authorities, and may also include substantial rural areas (such as the sparsely populated Éislek forest of northern Luxembourg).

Kuwait can be considered a city due to the majority of its population being located within Kuwait City and economic activity. Kuwait itself has no official cities and is governed by one municipality which is a common characteristic of city states. However, the majority of the country is desert rather than urban area like true city states.

Occasionally, microstates with high population densities such as San Marino are cited as city-states, despite lacking a large urban centre.

== Proposed city-states ==
=== London ===
The London independence movement seeks a city-state separate from the United Kingdom.

=== Jerusalem ===
Some have proposed that Jerusalem could become an independent city-state under United Nations or International protection. Jerusalem is a holy city for three major religions, Judaism, Christianity, and Islam, creating religious tension. Israel and Palestine both claim Jerusalem as their capital, causing a conflict and dispute over the city, most notably East Jerusalem. The UN partition plan for Palestine included provisions for a "Special international regime" to be established in Jerusalem known as Corpus separatum. However, the plan was rejected by Palestinian leaders.

=== Hong Kong ===
The Hong Kong independence movement is a political movement advocating the independence of Hong Kong as a sovereign state separate from China. Hong Kong is a special administrative region (SAR) of China and is thus granted a high degree of de jure autonomy, as stipulated by Article 2 of the Hong Kong Basic Law ratified under the Sino-British Joint Declaration. Since the handover of Hong Kong from the United Kingdom to China in 1997, a growing number of Hongkongers have become concerned about what they see as Beijing's encroachment on the territory's freedoms and the failure of the Hong Kong government to deliver "genuine democracy". Since the early 2010s there has been a major rise of awareness in Hongkonger self-identity, which was largely seen as a reaction to the gradual encroachment of the One country, two systems status-quo by the Chinese Communist Party especially after Xi Jinping's accession to General Secretary of the Chinese Communist Party, the top position in November 2012, marked a more hardline authoritarian approach. The spectre that Hong Kong may similarly be brought to heel became an important element in the independence movements. Advocating for Hong Kong independence became illegal after the Hong Kong national security law was enacted in 2020.

=== Sovereign State of the Bektashi Order ===
The Sovereign State of the Bektashi Order is a proposed city-state in the Albanian capital of Tirana which will be established if approved by the Albanian Parliament and a national referendum. The state, which would be led by the Bektashi Order, is planned to be similar in structure to the Vatican City. The idea has been proposed by Albanian Prime Minister Edi Rama and leader of the Bektashi Order Baba Mondi in the hope that sovereignty would help promote moderate Muslim values instead of radical ideologies. The Sovereign State of the Bektashi Order would be surrounded by the suburbs of eastern Tirana and would be the smallest nation in the world.

== See also ==
- Charter city
- City network
- Consolidated city-county
- Federal district
- Pyu city-states
- Royal free city
- List of fictional city-states in literature
