= Georges Burou =

French gynecologist (1910–1987)

- Born: 6 September 1910; Tarbes, France
- Died: 17 December 1987 (aged 77); Mohammedia, Morocco
- Education: Algiers University of Medicine
- Occupation: Surgeon
- Military career
- Allegiance: Free France
- Branch: Free French Army
- Service years: 1943–1945
- Rank: Second lieutenant
- Conflicts: World War II

Georges Burou (French pronunciation: [ʒɔʁʒ byʁu]; 6 September 1910 – 17 December 1987) was a French gynecologist who managed a clinic in Casablanca, Morocco, and is widely credited with innovating modern sex reassignment surgery for trans women.

Notable patients include Coccinelle, April Ashley, and Jan Morris.

Surgeons, including Stanley Biber, have credited Burou's methods as the basis for their techniques.

== Early life, schooling, military service ==
Burou was born on 6 September 1910, in Tarbes in the Hautes Pyrénées, France, while his parents were visiting the Burou family in the nearby village of Juillan. His parents worked as schoolteachers in Algiers, where Burou spent his youth.

Burou underwent medical training at the Algiers University of Medicine. He specialized in gynecology and obstetrics at the Maternity of Mustapha Hospital in Algiers and became "Chef de Clinique" at Parnet Hospital in the Algiers suburb of Hussein Dey. During his training Burou took a special interest in anatomy, and later colleagues were reportedly highly impressed by his detailed knowledge of the anatomy of the perineum and pelvis.

From early 1943 onward Burou first served as a second lieutenant in the French Expeditionary Corps and eventually left North Africa as a military surgeon of the 2nd Moroccan Mountain Division to actively join battle at the French island of Corsica and the Italian river Garigliano and mountain of Cassino. Together with New Zealand and Indian troops, his division forced through the German Gustav Line at Cassino on May 13, 1944, the turning point in the liberation of Italy, and lost 1120 men in the process. After the liberation of Rome, Venice, and Siena, Burou landed at Cassis for the Allied campaigns in the Provence, the Alps, the Vosges, and Alsace. During the subsequent liberation of Strasburg in 1945, one of his best friends died in combat. Shortly after, when in the south of Germany, his service ended when he returned to Algiers to bury his father.

== Clinique du Parc ==
Early reports of sex reassignment surgery had been published in Germany in the 1920s, but it was not until approximately three decades later that the practice became more generally known; early surgeries were performed mostly in Europe and Casablanca. Burou operated his sex reassignment clinic, called "Clinique du Parc", in Casablanca and in 1973 reported his experience with over 3000 individual cases.

=== Penile inversion vaginoplasty ===
Between 1956 and 1958 Burou independently developed the anteriorly pedicled penile skin flap inversion vaginoplasty in his clinic. The technique became the "gold standard" of skin-lined vaginoplasty in trans women. Burou performed well over 800 confirmed vaginoplasties by 1974. That year, he published his technique for the first time, and presented it at the Second Interdisciplinary Symposium on Gender Dysphoria Syndrome at Stanford. He is said to have worked at the clinic seven days a week, and frequently up to fifteen hours each day.

In addition to sex-reassignment, he also performed more common obstetrics and gynecology practices from the clinic. Outpatient appointments were held mostly in small offices in the Avenue d’Amade portion of the clinic, and the Rue Lapébie building held the operation rooms, a surgical ward, a 15-crib nursery, and delivery and patients’ rooms. Burou's wife, Jeanne ("Nanou") Boisvert, named rooms in the clinic after different flowers, each hand-painted on small frames on the doors. In contrast to these warm touches, "an air of stern purpose informed the fourth floor, for these were the operating quarters."

Contact with the outside world was initially discouraged for patients during the early days of their recovery from sex reassignment surgery. When patients were able to move about postoperatively, and later when going to Burou's office to have their bandages changed, the clinic became a place where patients often had the opportunity to meet other trans women from various countries. British writer Jan Morris recalls: "How many there were of us, I do not know, but we were of several varieties. We were Greek, French, American, British." Notable patients include Coccinelle, April Ashley, and allegedly, Amanda Lear.

== Methods ==
=== Patient selection and bedside manner ===
Burou reported all of his vaginoplasty patients to have been prepared, to have undergone psychiatric care and hormonal therapy. However, patient Jan Morris wrote that Burou did not bother too much with diagnosis or previous treatment. Burou later confirmed that he did not ask his patients too many questions, but sought to fulfill their wishes, and that he did restrict his services to trans women with a distinct "feminine" appearance or character. He refused his services to minors even if they had parental consent, because he felt "the operation is definitive and irreversible and one . . . could not risk making a mistake." His international patients were often admitted the afternoon they arrived at the clinic, and were prepared for surgery as soon as that evening or the next morning.

Morris, who was one of Burou's most prominent trans female patients, recalled in her memoir Conundrum that he would do his rounds twice daily "dressed for the corniche and looking in general pretty devastating." Morris recalled that he would sit at the end of her bed "and chat desultorily of this and that, type a few very slow words on [her] typewriter, read a headline from The Times in a delectable Maurice Chevalier accent, and eventually take an infinitely gentle look at his handiwork."

=== Burou's vaginoplasty procedure ===
The entire surgical procedure was done in one operation consisting of two successive parts (which remains the prevailing methodology): (1) the creation of a space between the rectum and the prostate, and (2) the lining of this space with penile skin after the latter had been separated from its contents. Burou was acknowledged for "results that are cosmetically excellent."

According to Burou, the operation began with an incision from the anal area through the scrotal raphe. After dissecting of the bulbus urethrae and both corpora cavernosa, the rectum and the prostate were separated by cutting all the ligaments between the bulb and the rectum. Burou made a point of barring, but not damaging, the posterior aspect of the prostate so that the penile skin flap after invagination would immediately overlie this aspect, which he felt optimized the possibility of postoperative orgasm. The separation was extended digitally and was considered complete as soon as two fingers or a vaginal retractor could be admitted easily. Burou considered this first part of the operation to be the most important, but most risky, and stressed the importance of repeated intrarectal inspection to determine that there was no lesion to the rectal wall.

He considered the second part of the operation to be relatively easy. The initial incision was extended along the raphe of the scrotum to the root of the penis. The surgical field was widened by retracting the scrotal skin on both sides and widely exposing the corpus spongiosum, both corpora cavernosa, and the two testes. Once the testes and their pedicles had been dissected, the spermatic cord was cut and ligated. Then, both corpora cavernosa were ligated and cut at a level just distally to their attachment to the inferior ramus of the pubic bone. The level of transection of the spongious bulb and urethra had to correspond with the length of the future urethra. Subsequently, all erectile bodies were pushed out and dissected from the penile skin. When available, the foreskin was kept and the distal, coronal edge of the penile skin was closed; this yielded the skin tube that was inserted as neovaginal lining.

On the lower abdominal skin, a slight skin slit was made to allow the future urethra to be passed through upon inversion of the neovaginal lining. A Foley catheter was inserted and the urethra was sutured onto the catheter, about 5 cm distally from its passage through the skin. No skin suture was used in the urethral meatus, and some kind of scar contraction was always foreseen. Two sutures were bilaterally passed through the perianal skin and the levator ani muscles and served to tightly and firmly support an obstetric stent, placed in the neovagina to provide support for the inverted skin flap. A drain was left in the posterior commissure and, finally, excess scrotal skin was resected to obtain a good appearance of the major labia.

Burou's first vaginoplasty, in 1956, took him three hours to complete, however at the height of his sex-reassignment work by 1974, performing up to six vaginoplasties a month, he could complete the procedure in one hour. The post-op patient's arms were strapped to the bed for the first night after the procedure. The drain was removed 48 hours after surgery, the catheter four days, and the stent eight. The new vagina was managed by frequent or daily insertion of fingers or retractors, and the new urethra was kept open by the daily introduction of the catheter, ensuring against neomeatal stenosis. Most patients spent two weeks in the clinic.

=== Cost ===
In 1975 one patient addressed Burou, requesting his services, and received a prompt reply that detailed the cost of sex-reassignment surgery at US$5,000 "payable in cash upon arrival, if possible in travellers cheques." The price included "12 - 15 days hospitalization at the clinic, medical care and fees included, as well as the doctor’s payment." This price is considered modest for the time based upon reports that indicated the average cost of sex-reassignment surgery was on the rise. Burou is said to have been willing to make "enormous" financial concessions to his fees whenever a case "merited the operation".

== Personal life ==
Burou was known to have a great love of the sea and had a great proclivity for water recreation throughout his life. A devoted sportsman, Burou loved all nautical sports, as well as golf, was a "fierce" windsurfer, and was among the first to cross the Strait of Gibraltar on water skis. He wished to become a commercial marine officer before going into medicine, and thus was at first reluctant to pursue his medical training.

Burou spoke little English but for certain gynecological and golf vocabulary.

Burou moved to Casablanca as a result of his fiancée, Jeanne ("Nanou") Boisvert, whose parents had a farm there.It was with her assistance that he began practising gynecology and obstetrics independently in Morocco, from his private quarters on the third floor of a classic colonial building at 103 Boulevard de la Gare (later called Boulevard Mohammed V after Morocco's independence).

On the morning of Sunday, 8 November 1942, while treating French sailors in the schoolyard of École de la Fonçiere at Rue de l’Horloge (later named Rue N’Chakra Rahal) after the arrival of United States Marine Corps in Casablanca, Burou was nearly killed by a 10 kg (22 lb) piece of shell. He was protected only by the branch of a tree, and thereafter kept the piece of shell in his office, reportedly as a memento mori.

In 1950 Burou and his family moved to 71 Avenue d’Amade, situated across from Casablanca's main park, now called Parc de la Ligue-Arabe. Burou and his wife built the Clinique du Parc on Rue Lapébie, the backstreet that ran parallel to the prestigious avenue. Burou wanted the building attached to his office and private quarters so as "not to distance himself from his patients," and so that he could be immediately available should a patient be admitted late at night. Additionally, this allowed his patients the choice of entering the clinic either from the elegant Avenue d’Amade main entrance or the more inconspicuous Rue Lapébie entrance.

== Death ==
Burou continued to work at the Clinique du Parc until his death in 1987. On Sunday 17 December his boat ran out of fuel outside of the harbour of Mohammedia, and he subsequently drowned. His body went undiscovered for five days.

== Legacy ==
Due to the controversial nature of the procedure, Burou is said to have kept a low profile in order to continue his practice. His work at Clinique du Parc, which has been described by current day plastic surgeons as "pioneering", "innovative", and "genius", made Burou a notable figure in the recorded history of plastic surgery. The discretion of Burou's clinic made him relatively unknown to his medical contemporaries, despite him being well known among many trans women around the world. His level of renown was such that "going to Casablanca" became a popular colloquialism for gender confirming surgery at this time. Burou was a notable resource for a great many trans women throughout much of the latter half of the 20th century.

== Bibliography ==
- Hage, J. Joris; Karim, Refaat B.; Laub, Donald R. (December 2007). "On the origin of pedicled skin inversion vaginoplasty: life and work of Dr Georges Burou of Casablanca". Annals of Plastic Surgery. 59 (6): 723–729. doi:10.1097/01.sap.0000258974.41516.bc. ISSN 0148-7043. PMID 18046160. S2CID 25373951.
- Morris, Jan (1974). Conundrum (1 ed.). New York. ISBN 0-15-122563-X. OCLC 860297.
