= Pavel Tchelitchew =

Russian painter

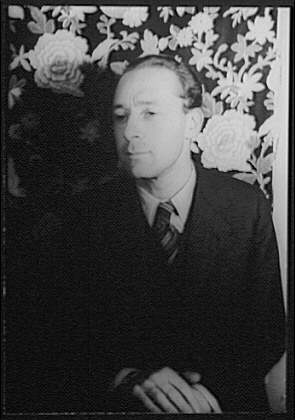
- Pavel Tchelitchew, photographed by Carl Van Vechten, 1934
- Born: Pavel Fyodorovich Chelishev; 3 October 1898 (21 September Old Style); Dubrovka, Duminichsky, Russian Empire
- Died: 31 July 1957 (aged 58); Grottaferrata, Italy
- Known for: Painting, drawing, stage design, costume design
- Notable work: Hide and Seek (1940-1942), Phenomena (1936–1938)
- Movement: Neo-romanticism, surrealism, futurism, constructivism
- Patrons: Gertrude Stein, Edith Sitwell, Edward James, Lincoln Kirstein

Pavel Fyodorovich Tchelitchew (/ˌtʃɛˈlɪtʃɛv/ Che-LIT-chev; Russian: Па́вел Фёдорович Чели́щев) (3 October [O.S. 21 September] 1898 – 31 July 1957) was a Russian-born surrealist painter, set designer and costume designer. He became an American naturalized citizen in 1952.

== Early life ==
Tchelitchew was born to an aristocratic family of landowners and was educated by private tutors. Tchelitchew expressed an early interest in ballet and art. His family was forced to flee Russia after the Russian Revolution in 1917. He studied under Aleksandra Ekster at the Kiev Academy, and after graduation worked designing and building theater sets in Odessa and later Berlin from 1920 to 1923.

== Career ==
Tchelitchew moved to Paris in 1923 and became acquainted with Gertrude Stein and, through her, the Sitwell and Gorer families. His interest in creating multimedia experiences during this period that drew together painting, film, and dance, led to collaborations with ballet impresario Sergei Diaghilev (stage designer for Ode by Léonide Massine, 1928) and choreographer George Balanchine. He and Edith Sitwell had a long-standing close friendship and they corresponded frequently. Tchelitchew painted six major portraits of Sitwell.

His first U.S. show was of his drawings, along with other artists, at the newly opened Museum of Modern Art in 1930. In 1934, he moved from Paris to New York City with his partner, writer Charles Henri Ford. In New York he continued to work with Balanchine and met his greatest champion and patron, Lincoln Kirstein. From 1940 to 1947, he provided illustrations for the surrealist magazine View, edited by Ford and writer and film critic Parker Tyler.

Pavel Tchelitchew The Juggler, 1931, oil on canvas

Tchelitchew's early painting was abstract in style, described as constructivist and futurist and influenced by his study with Aleksandra Ekster. After emigrating to Paris he became associated with the neo-romanticism movement. He continuously experimented with new styles, eventually incorporating multiple perspectives and elements of surrealism and fantasy into his painting. As a set and costume designer, he collaborated with Sergei Diaghilev and George Balanchine, among others.

Tchelitchew's works can be found in the collections of the Art Institute of Chicago, the National Gallery of Art in Washington, D.C., the Courtauld Institute of Art in London, and the Philadelphia Museum of Art.

Among Tchelitchew's well-known paintings are portraits of Natalia Glasko, Edith Sitwell, and Gertrude Stein and the works Phenomena (1936–1938) and Hide and Seek (1940–1942). Tchelitchew designed sets for Ode (Paris, 1928), L'Errante (Paris, 1933), Nobilissima Visione (London, 1938) and Ondine (Paris, 1939). He was known for camouflaging bodies and faces into geometric lines or landscaped forms on artwork. He used abstractionism and symbolism to convey both the outer and inner appearance of the object.

=== Hide-and-Seek ===
Pavel Tchelitchew, Hide-and-Seek 1940–42, Oil on canvas, 78½ x 84¾ inches (199.3 x 215.3 cm)

Hide-and-Seek 6' 6 1/2" x 7' 3/4" (199.3 x 215.3 cm) is in the collection of the Museum of Modern Art (MoMA) in New York City).

The painting measures 6' 6 1/2" x 7' 3/4" (199.3 x 215.3 cm) and was painted between June 1940 and June 1942. It was acquired shortly after its completion by MoMA. Tchelitchew was given a retrospective of his work at MoMA in 1942.

Hide and Seek was completed by Tchelitchew in 1942, but he had been working on variations on its imagery since about 1934.

A phenomenon seen in Hide and Seek is that of the "simultaneous image", in which a degree of ambiguity exists between various components of the composition. This is not unique to Hide and Seek. Related phenomena are seen in the work of other artists, for instance Giuseppe Arcimboldo.

== Personal life ==
Tchelitchew became a United States citizen in 1952, but lived mainly in Italy from 1949.

Tchelitchew was openly homosexual. He met the American pianist Allen Tanner in Berlin in the 1920s and the two men became lovers, moving to Paris together to pursue their artistic careers. In 1934, he left Tanner for the poet Charles Henri Ford. Ford and Tchelitchew had met shortly after Ford's arrival in Paris in 1933 to publish The Young and Evil.

== Death ==
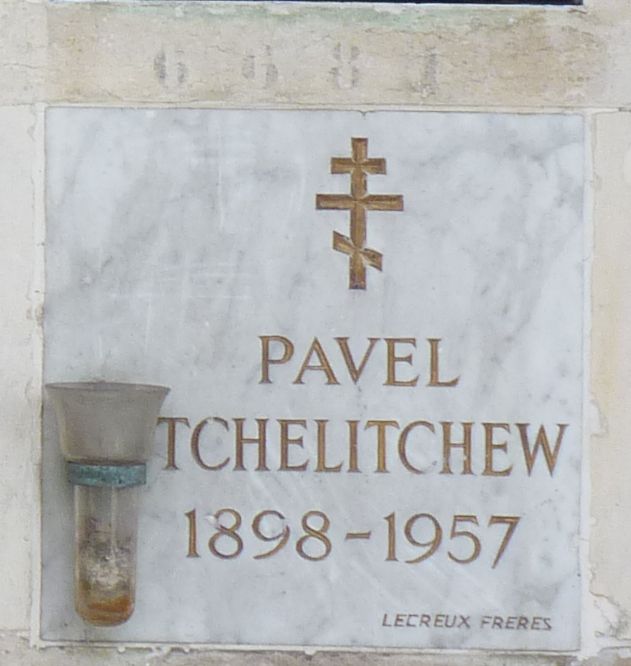
Grave of Pavel Tchelitchew

Tchelitchew died in Grottaferrata, Italy in 1957. His long time partner, Charles Henri Ford, was by his bedside. Tchelitchew's ashes are interred in the columbarium of Père Lachaise Cemetery in Paris.
