= Venice (Morris book) =

Work by Jan Morris on the culture and history of Venice, Italy

- 1983 edition
- Author: Jan Morris
- Language: English
- Subject: History
- Publisher: Faber
- Publication date: 1960, 1974, 1983, 1993, 2008
- Publication place: United Kingdom
- Pages: 337

Venice (1960) is a celebrated book by the Welsh author Jan Morris (1926-2020) on the history, culture and meaning of Venice, Italy. It won the 1961 Heinemann Award, became an international best-seller and was cited as one of The Guardian ’s top 100 non-fiction books in 2011 (the endorsement read: "An eccentric but learned guide to the great city's art, history, culture and people").

Often hailed as one of the best travel books ever written, The Times described it as “a classic love letter to Italy’s most iconic city”. Originally published by Faber and Faber as by James Morris, she transitioned in 1972 and subsequently revised the book as Jan Morris four times. She described it in the original introduction as “not a history book, but it necessarily contains many passages of history. These I have used magpie-style, embedding them in the text where they seem to me to glitter most effectively…. It is not a guide book, either: but … I have listed the Venetian sights that seem to me most worth seeing… nor is it exactly a report”. Rather, it is "a highly subjective, romantic, impressionistic picture less of a city than of an experience."

== Background ==
Morris first visited Venice as a young British Army intelligence officer in 1945. Her biographer reports that she was "immediately captivated by the city. He found it intoxicating". She returned in 1959 with her family, living in the city for many months and writing in this work about "what she calls the lust of Venice at that time, the beauty of the canals, the buildings, and especially the lagoon that left him speechless with pleasure".

== Content ==
Venice is divided into three main sections — The People, The City, The Lagoon:

- LANDFALL – brief introduction
- THE PEOPLE – explores the vivid history, singular culture and unique character of Venetian men and women
- THE CITY – describes the waterways, bridges, architecture, and curiosities of the city—its smells, sounds, lights and colors – not neglecting the ubiquitous tourists
- THE LAGOON - ventures across the local waters from Chioggia in the south to Jesolo in the north with many places in between.
- EMBARKATION – brief epilogue

Appended are a concise chronology of the city's history with relevant page references, an index and map references.

== Editions ==
- Morris, James, Venice (1960); London: Faber and Faber; 337 pgs; B&W photos; Paperback edition, 1963.
  - Published in the US as The World of Venice (1960), [New York?]: Pantheon Books. ISBN 9780151990863.
- Morris, James, Venice (1974); Faber & Faber; “1st revised edition”; Paperback; 336 pgs; blurb states “also writes as Jan Morris”; ISBN 9780571168972
  - Published in the US as The World of Venice: Revised Edition (1974); Harcourt Brace Jovanovich.
- Morris, James (1983), Venice, Faber and Faber Ltd; “2nd revised edition”; 1983; 325 pgs; softcover.
- Morris, Jan (1993), Venice, “3rd revised edition”. Faber & Faber, 314 pgs; ISBN 978-0-571-16897-2.
  - Published in the US as The World of Venice (1995): New York: HarperCollins; with a new foreword by the author.
- Morris, Jan (2008), Venice; London: Folio Society; New (1988) introduction and minor revisions; Two maps, redrawn (“Venice” [endpaper] and “Venice: Lagoon and Lido”); 335 pgs; ISBN 9780571247882.

== Other Morris works on Venice ==
- In The Venetian Empire: A Sea Voyage (1980; Penguin Books Ltd), Morris travels along the historic Venetian trade routes from Venice itself to Greece, Crete and Cyprus. She thus provides a historical companion for travelers through the lands the Doges once ruled.
- In 1981, Morris edited and introduced an abridged edition of John Ruskin’s famous work The Stones of Venice (1851-53; Mount Kisco, New York: Moyer Bell Limited, 1989. Folio Society edition, 2001.)
- In A Venetian Bestiary (1982) Morris provides a “celebration”, in words and pictures, of the animals of Venice, both real and fantastic.

== See also ==
- Jan Morris bibliography
