= Conundrum Press =

Conundrum Press is the name of two book publishing companies in North America:

- Conundrum Press (Canada)
- Conundrum Press (United States)
