= Hide-and-Seek (painting) =

1942 painting by Pavel Tchelitchew

- Artist: Pavel Tchelitchew
- Year: 1942
- Medium: Oil on canvas
- Dimensions: 199.3 cm × 215.3 cm (78.5 in × 84.8 in)
- Location: Museum of Modern Art, New York

Hide-and-Seek is an oil on canvas painting by the Russian painter Pavel Tchelitchew, from 1942. It is held in the Museum of Modern Art (MoMA), in New York.

The painting of large dimensions, measures 6' 6 1/2" x 7' 3/4" (199.3 x 215.3 cm) and was created between June 1940 and June 1942. It was acquired shortly after by MoMA. Tchelitchew was given a retrospective of his work at MoMA in 1942.

Hide-and-Seek was completed by Tchelitchew in 1942, but he had been working on variations on its imagery since about 1934.

A phenomenon seen in Hide-and-Seek is that of the "simultaneous image", in which a degree of ambiguity exists between various components of the composition. This is not unique to Hide-and-Seek. Related phenomena are seen in the work of other artists, for instance Giuseppe Arcimboldo.

Hide-and-Seek is said to have been admired or "worshipped" by some members of the Temple of the True Inner Light, a psychedelic church based in New York City.

== See also ==
- Hidden faces
