= Pax Britannica Trilogy =

Trilogy of history books by Jan Morris

- Author: Jan Morris
- Language: English
- Subject: History
- Publisher: Faber
- Publication date: 1968, 1973, 1978
- Publication place: United Kingdom

The Pax Britannica Trilogy comprises three books of history written by Jan Morris. The books cover the British Empire, from the earliest days of the East India Company to the troubled years of independence and 1960s post-colonialism. Morris wrote the books over a ten-year period, beginning in 1968 with Pax Britannica: The Climax of Empire. The series took 14 years to write, and Morris has referred to the series as the emotional centrepiece of her life.

For the series, Morris pulled from her experience as a soldier, where she was an intelligence officer, and experiences military deployment in Palestine, and a roving correspondent in the Middle East for The Times, and The Guardian.

The series has been criticized for being overly nostalgic for Britain's imperialist period. Morris herself described imperialism as "a blessing to the world at large".

The books in chronological order are;

- Pax Britannica: The Climax of Empire (1968)
- Heaven’s Command: An Imperial Progress (1973)
- Farewell the Trumpets: An Imperial Retreat (1978)
