= The Kuwait Municipality =

Independent public authority in Kuwait City

The Kuwait Municipality is an independent public authority located in Kuwait City. The municipality carries out its work through an elected municipal council whose task is to take care of citizens’ interests, which in turn is subject to the supervision of the minister. The Municipal Council is planning, directing and controlling, and the Municipal Director and the Executive Authority works to complete and implement the work.

== Municipality tasks ==
The municipality works on drawing up the urban policy, implementing and developing it, preserving the architectural heritage, and highlighting it in accordance with the general structural plan of the state, and structuring and maintaining the comfort and general hygiene of the population in accordance with the terms of reference established for it in this regard. The municipality has also recently added electronic services to facilitate citizens' personal transactions. The municipality also aims to cancel its paper transactions and make all its transactions electronic by the end of 2022. Taking into account the provisions of Law No. (33) of 2000 and (39) of 2002, the municipality undertakes the work stipulated in Article 3 of the Real Estate Registration Law related to inspecting, surveying, identifying, making drawings and confirming the calculation of its surfaces, provided that the limits of these properties do not exceed what is stipulated. It shall not be amended or altered in its plans except with the approval of the stakeholders or based on final judicial rulings, except for state-owned lands.

== History of Municipality ==
The Kuwait Municipality was established on April 13, 1930, after Youssef bin Issa Al-Qana'i visited Bahrain in July 1928, where he witnessed the Bahrain Municipality, which was established in 1919. After that, he wrote an article entitled “Shari’a Ruling in the History of Municipalities.” After that, the idea of establishing the municipality was presented to the late ruler of Kuwait Sheikh Ahmed Al-Jaber, who was convinced of the idea and agreed to establish the Kuwait Municipality, to contribute to the responsibility of advancing the country in various health and social fields, and to carry out its activities through an elected municipal council that takes care of the interests of the citizens. At the beginning of the inception of the municipality, the administrative apparatus consisted of the general manager, the clerk of administration, a number of collectors, market cleaners and guards. The work of the municipality was limited to cleaning, monitoring and collecting fees. The headquarters of the municipality was in a small office inside a rented shop in the market. In 1933, the municipality moved to its headquarters in Safat Square. As for the executive authority, it is exercised by the mayor and assisted by the municipality director. The executive body consists of the departments of administrative, financial, technical and health affairs. By the end of the 1950s, a Supreme Council was formed in the country that included the heads of government departments in Kuwait and some of those with opinion and experience. In 1960, the municipality put laws, including a law whose second article stipulated the following: The municipality shall work to advance Kuwait in terms of construction and health by organizing and beautifying the city, protecting public health, ensuring the safety of foodstuffs, maintaining public comfort in homes and roads, and taking what leads to the progress of Kuwait and the welfare of its residents.
