= City network =

Geographical concept

City networks can either refer to a membership organization city leaders join to connect their city to other municipalities, or to a geographical concept used to describe inter-connectivity of cities on different levels (trade, railways, culture etc.).

== In international cooperation ==
The term "city network", in the context of international cooperation, refers to a membership organization that cities join either to take part to specific projects, to be represented by geographical specificity, or to assert political commitments. One of the main reasons why cities join a city network is to learn good practices from peer cities that have similar characteristics and face comparable challenges (infrastructure, urban transport, water and sanitation, smart city, etc.).

== As a geographic concept ==
City networks are a geographic concept studying connections between cities by placing the cities as nodes on a network. In modern conceptions of cities, these networks play an important role in understanding the nature of cities. City networks can identify physical connections to other places, such as railways, canals, scheduled flights, or telecommunication networks, typically done using graph theory. City networks also exist in immaterial form, such as trade, global finance, markets, migration, cultural links, shared social spaces or shared histories. There are also networks of religious nature, in particular through pilgrimage.

The city itself is then regarded as the node where different networks run together. Some urban thinkers have argued that cities can only be understood if the context of the city's connections is understood.

It has been argued that city networks are a key ingredient of what defines a city, along with the number of people (density) and the particular way of life in cities.

== See also ==
- Hanseatic League – 1200s–1669 trade confederation in Northern Europe
- Global city – City important to the world economy
