= Conundrum Press (United States) =

American book publishing company

- Founded: 1998
- Founder: David J. Rothman
- Country of origin: United States
- Headquarters location: Denver, Colorado
- Publication types: Books
- Official website: www.bowerhousebooks.com

Conundrum Press is a book publishing company founded in 1998 in Crested Butte, Colorado by David J. Rothman.

It focuses on poetry of the American West, especially Colorado. Although its platform is regional, it has attracted a number of nationally and internationally known writers and its books have won several awards. Conundrum has published books by Burton Raffel, James Tipton (with a Foreword by Isabel Allende), Mark Todd (with a Foreword by Dana Gioia), Zsolt, and others.
