= Hidden face =

Perception or recognition of faces in something essentially different

People often see hidden faces in things. Depending on the circumstances, this is referred to as pareidolia, the perception or recognition of a specific pattern or form in something essentially different. It is thus also a kind of optical illusion. When an artist notices that two different things have a similar appearance, and draws or paints a picture making this similarity evident, they make images with double meanings. Many of these images are hidden faces or hidden skulls.

These illusionistic pictures present the viewer with a mental choice of two interpretations: head or landscape, head or objects, head or architecture, etc. Both of them are valid, but the viewer sees only one of them, and very often they cannot see both interpretations simultaneously.

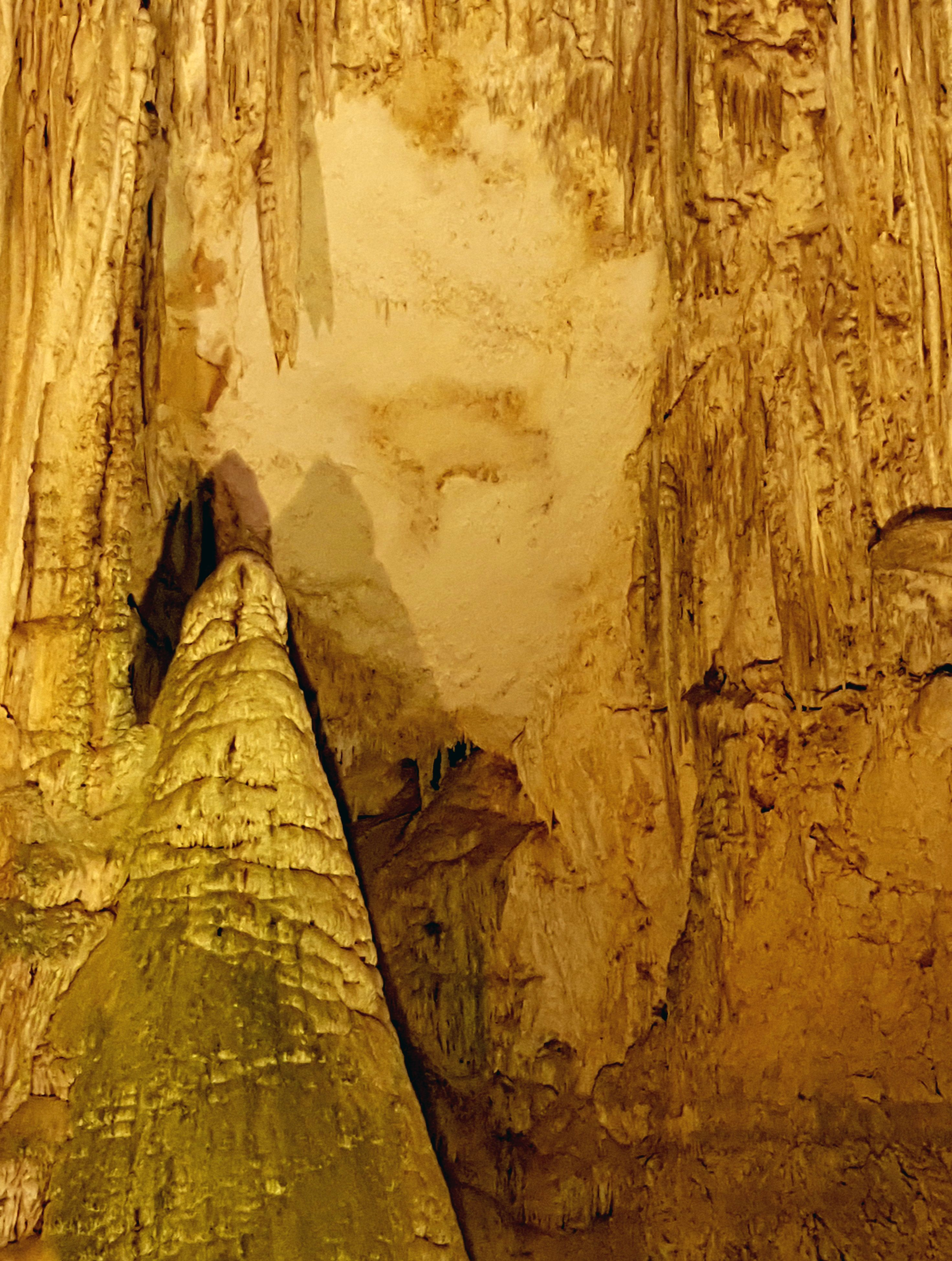
"The Organ Player" - Pareidolia phenomenon in Neptune's Grotto, Sardinia

== Chance images ==
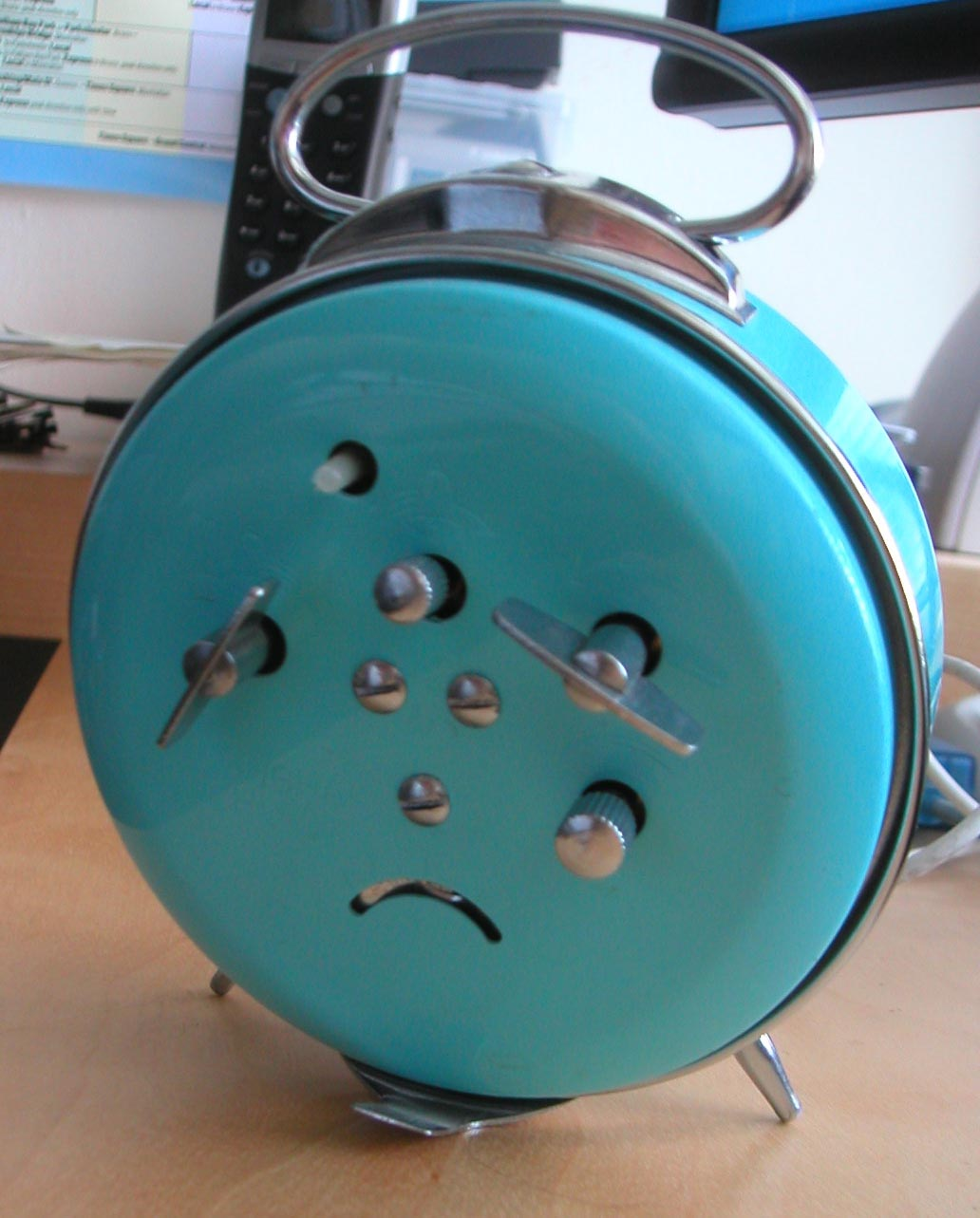
Chance image: An alarm clock where a "sad face" could be perceived.

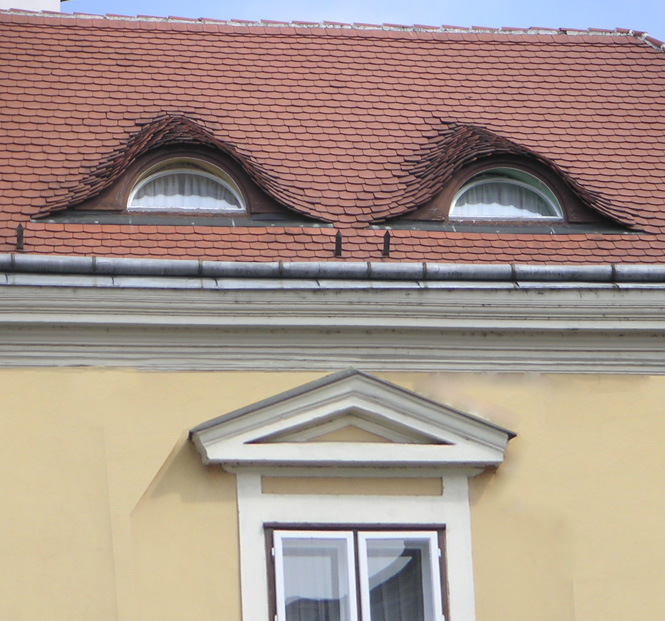
Sometimes buildings provide shapes which can be interpreted as "faces". (In Mon Oncle the filmmaker Jaques Tati gave a house "rolling eyes" by letting two actors move behind the windows.)

There are everyday examples of hidden faces, they are "chance images" including faces in the clouds, figures of the Rorschach Test and the Man in the Moon. Leonardo da Vinci wrote about them in his notebook: "If you look at walls that are stained or made of different kinds of stones you can think you see in them certain picturesque views of mountains, rivers, rocks, trees, plains, broad valleys, and hills of different shapes. You can also find in them battles and rapidly moving figures, strange faces and costumes, as well as an infinite number of things." Francois and Jean Robert collected and published a lot of photos of "chance faces".

== Hidden faces created by artists ==
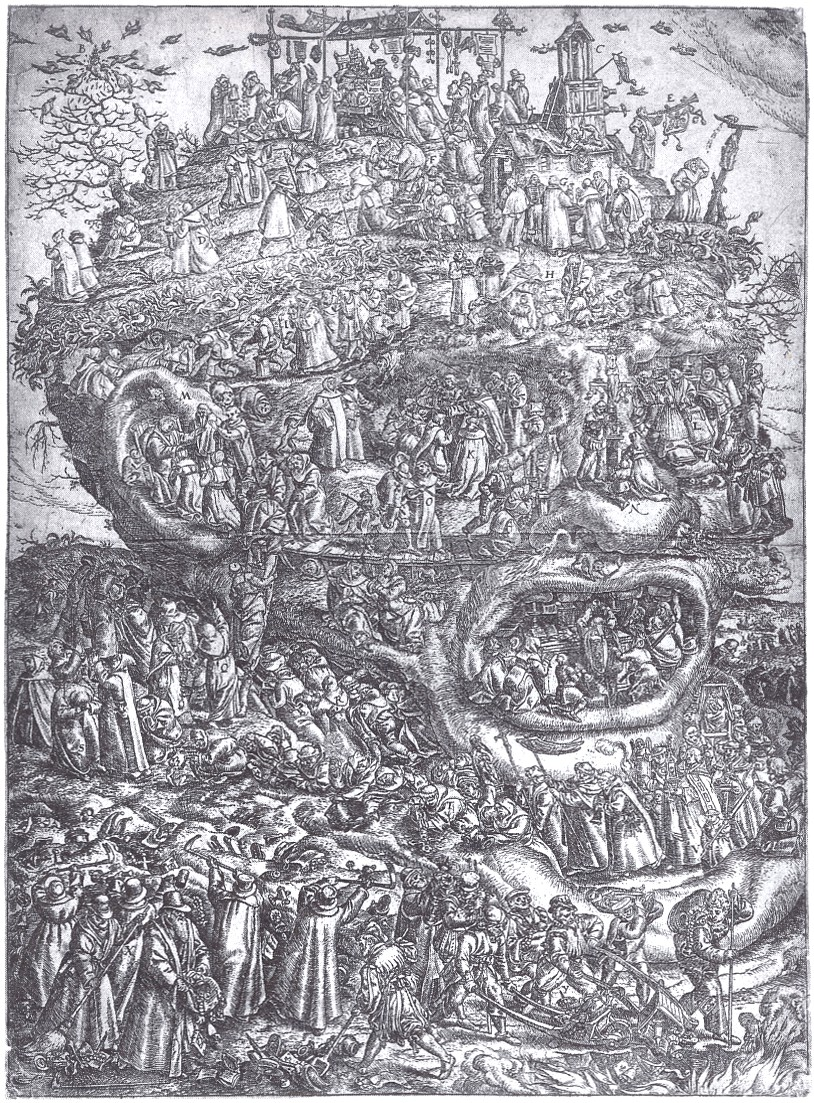
Marcus Gheeraerts the Elder: Allegory of Iconoclasts, (c. 1567)

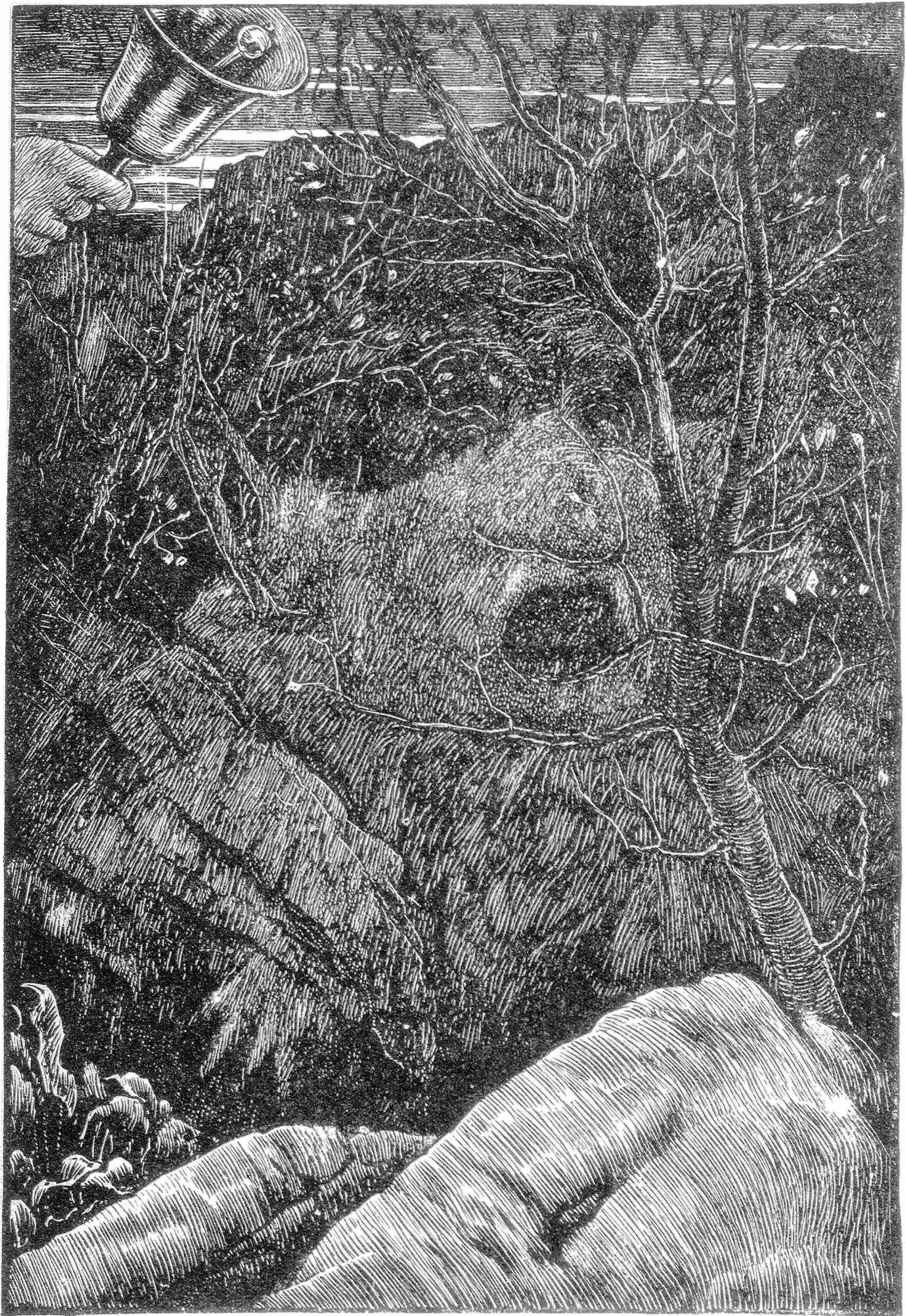
Hidden Face of the "Baker" in an illustration by Henry Holiday to Lewis Carroll's The Hunting of the Snark (1876)

The Mannerist master at the 16th-century imperial Habsburg courts of Vienna and Prague, Giuseppe Arcimboldo of Milan was probably the best known artist for creating extraordinary hidden faces. He arranged flowers, vegetables, fruits, shells, scallops and other animals, books and different things on the canvas in such a way that the whole collection of objects formed a portrait. His series of The Four Seasons seems to be the first use of this approach and technique. Arcimboldo's composite heads were celebrated and imitated by his contemporaries but they were relatively forgotten until participants in the twentieth-century art movements rediscovered them, bringing them to the attention of art historians. He is considered as forerunner of Dada and Surrealism.

Some other famous Renaissance and Baroque artists created hidden faces:

- Tobias Stimmer
- Hans Holbein the Younger
- Matthäus Merian
- Maria Sibylla Merian
- Marcus Gheeraerts the Elder
- Wenzel Hollar
- Josse de Momper

Salvador Dalí was fascinated by the technique of Arcimboldo and his paranoia-critical method was influenced by the Mannerist painter. For Dalí the Arcimboldo effect was a form of self concealment as well as this exhibitionist painter seemed, all throughout his life of constant posturing, to hide his real self behind the gaudy externals of his behaviour. Larvatus prodeo, "I wear a mask," he could have said with Descartes and he used this quotation from the French philosopher for the epigraph of his novel Hidden Faces. Probably his most famous "hidden face" is Voltaire in his oil painting: "Slave Market with the Disappearing Bust of Voltaire". Other Surrealist painters rediscovered the technique of hidden faces in the first part of 20th century:

- Max Ernst
- René Magritte

Istvan Orosz tries to combine the technique of anamorphosis with the hidden faces. Anamorphosis is used for those works of art that were made as distorted and unrecognizable through clever geometrical constructions. But when viewed from a certain point, or through a reflecting object placed upon it, the hidden image appears in its true shape, that is, it goes through retransformation. Orosz made experiments with anamorphoses not only in resurrecting the old technique but to improve and develop it. Instead of having a meaningless distorted image, his intent is to bring sense to the basic anamorphic picture, giving it meaning in itself with its second reading being revealed by viewing it from a different viewpoint such as looking at it through a special mirror. The ambiguous layers coming up by this approach make use of the connection or contrast of the two images within the same picture being independent from each other.

There are many other contemporary works using hidden faces:

- Shigeo Fukuda
- Octavio Ocampo
- Sandro del Prete
Giuseppe Arcimboldo: Vertumnus, a portrait of Rudolf II (1590 -1591)

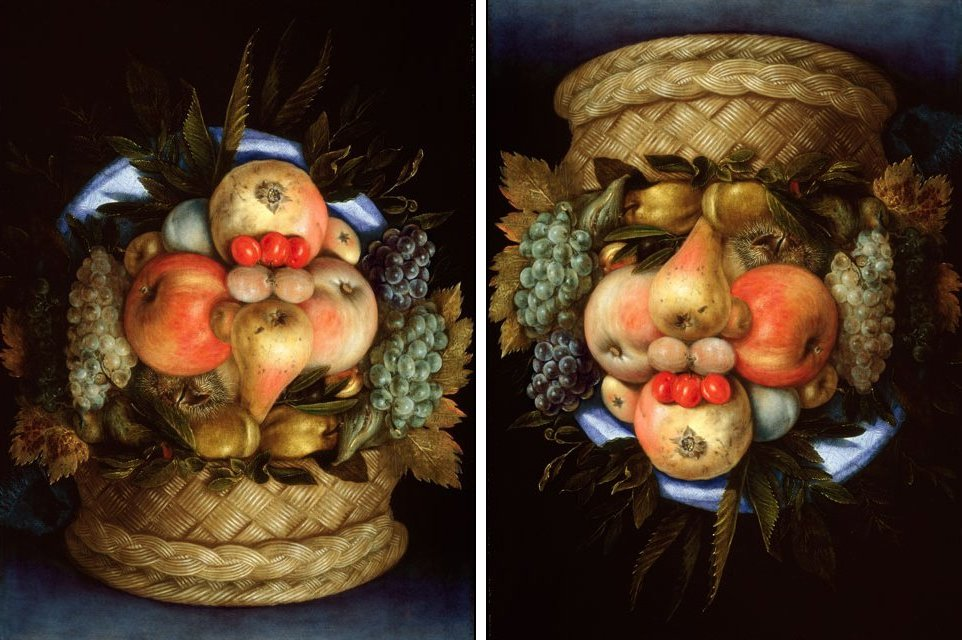
Reversible Head with Basket of Fruit, oil on panel painting by Giuseppe Arcimboldo, c. 1590

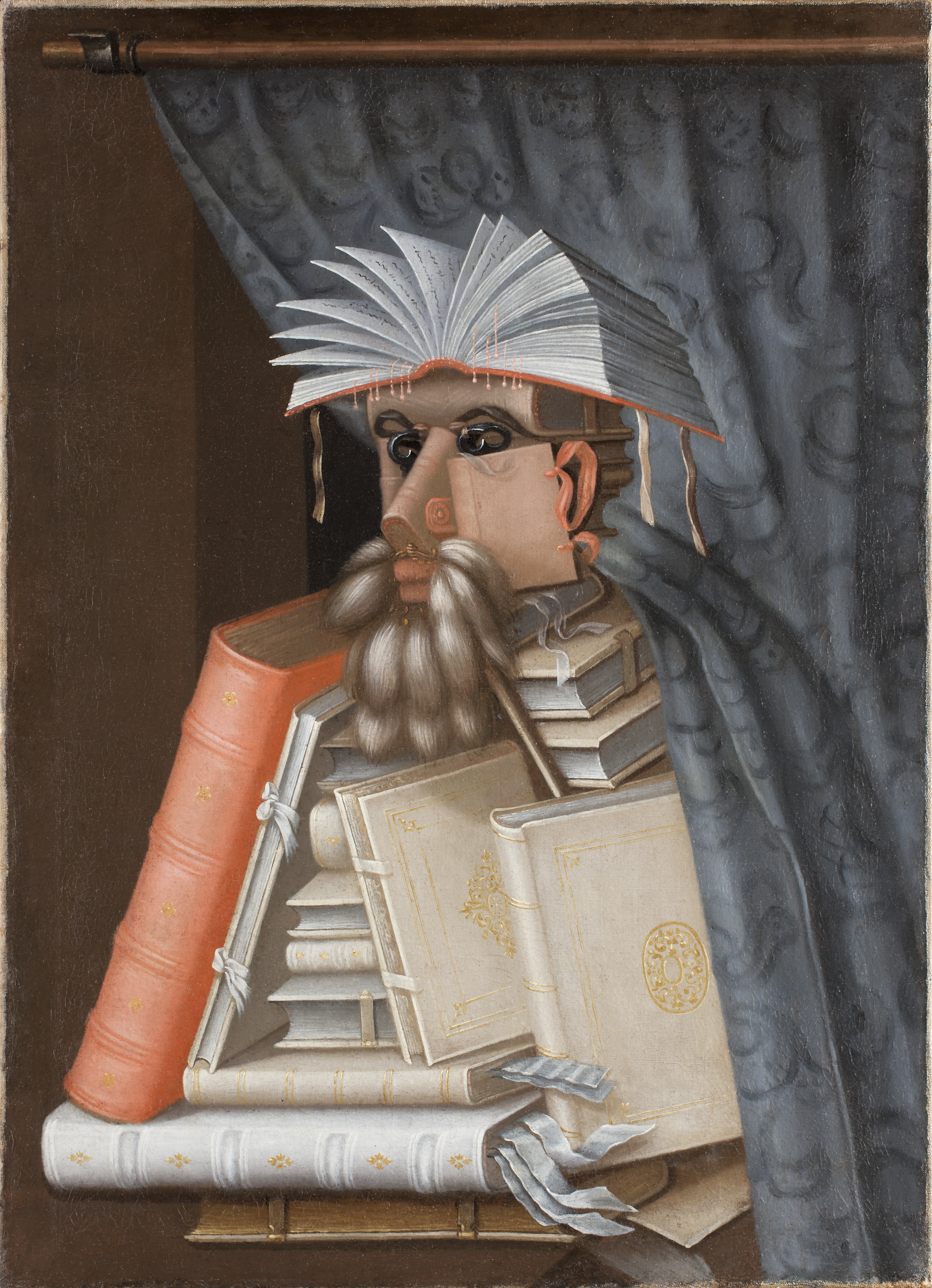
Giuseppe Arcimboldo: The Librarian, c. 1566

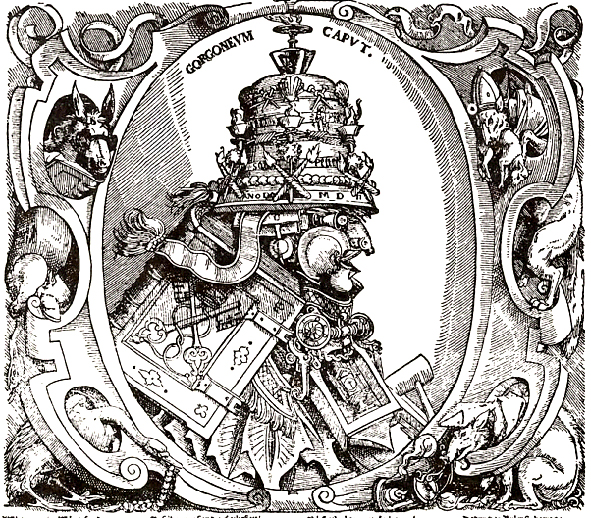
Tobias Stimmer: Hidden Portrait of the Pope (1577)

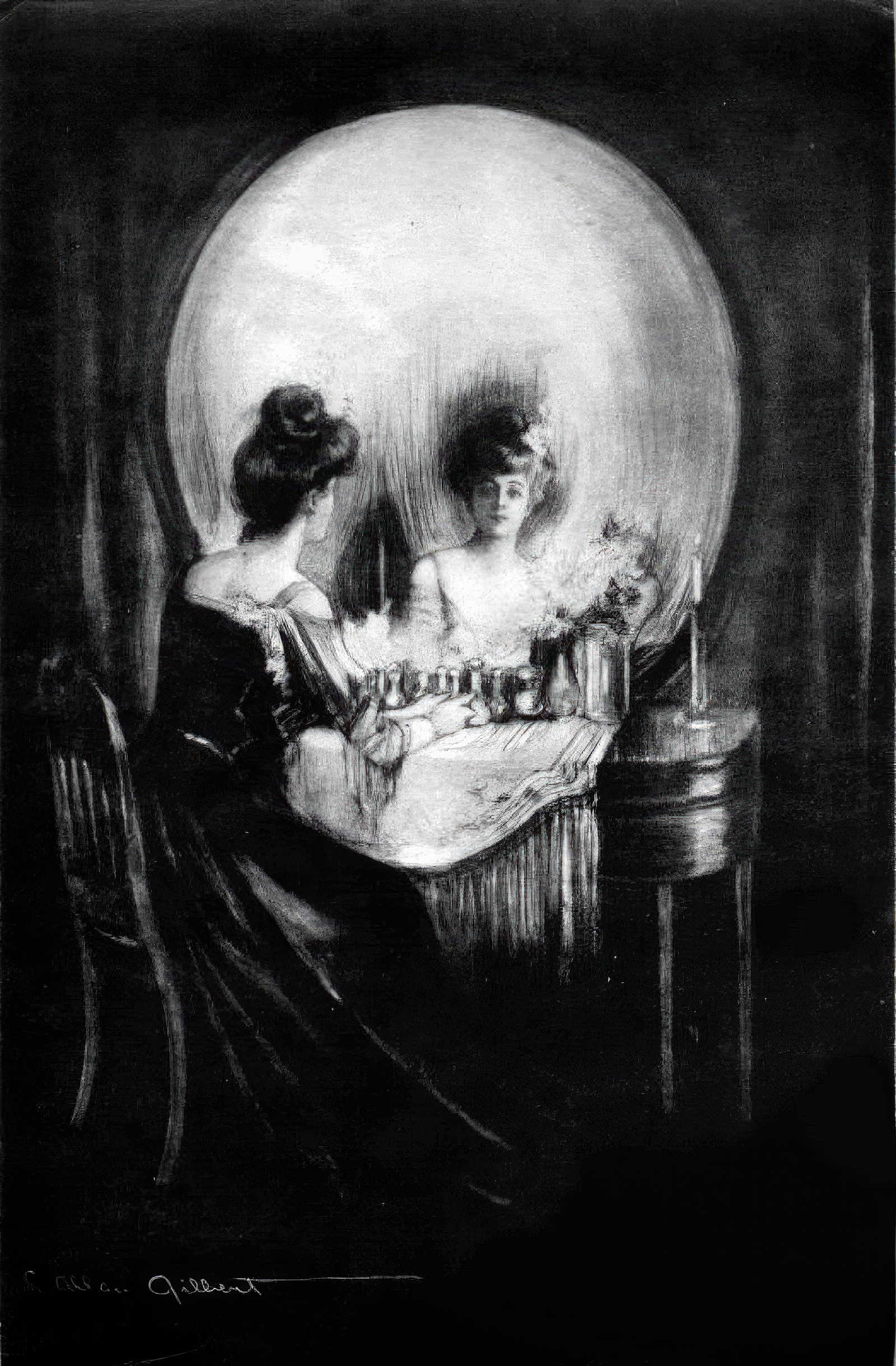
"All Is Vanity" by C. Allan Gilbert. Life, death, and meaning of existence are intertwined

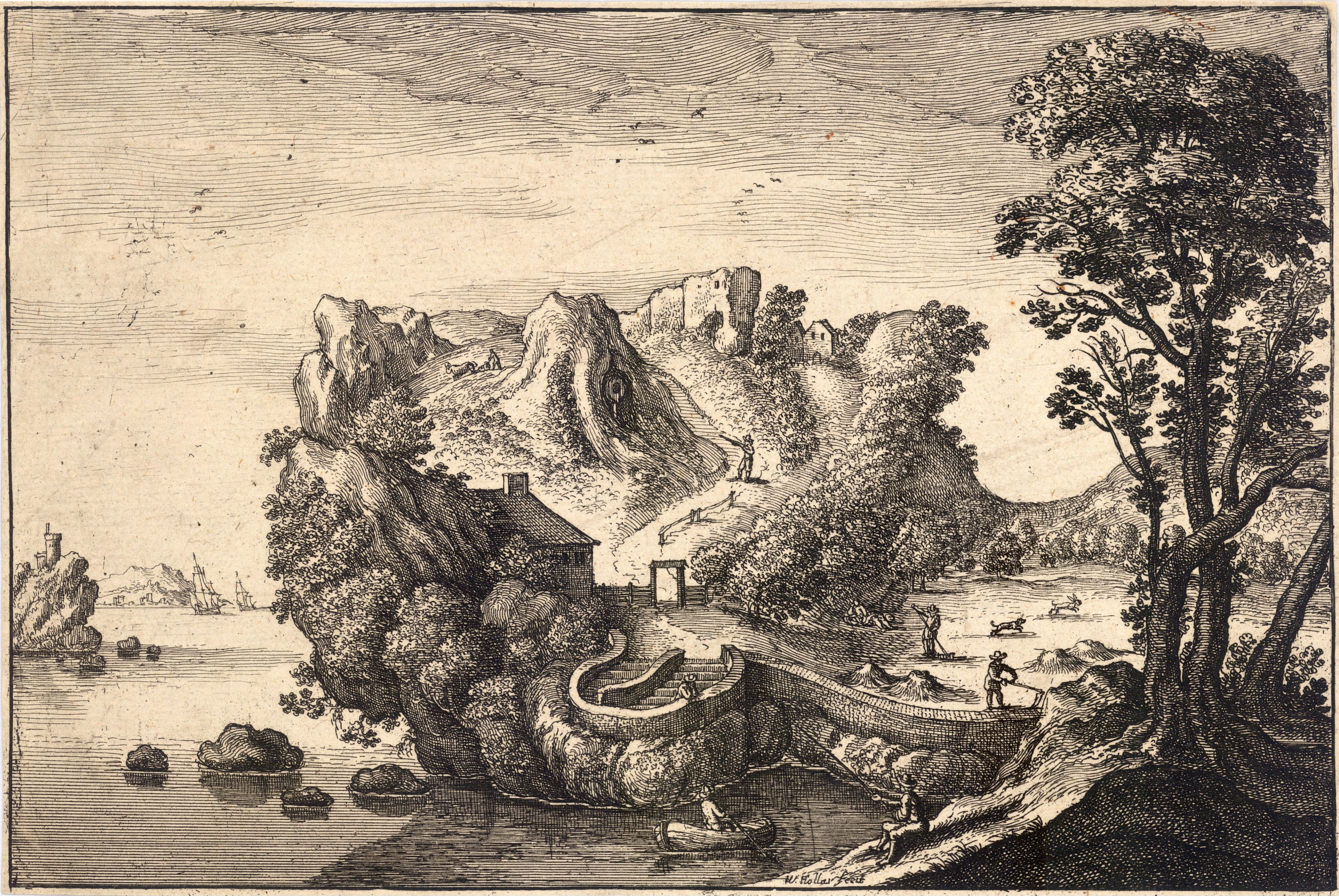
Wenzel Hollar (1607-1677): Landscape

== See also ==
- Anamorphosis
- Anthropomorphism
- Face perception
- Hide and Seek painting
- Rubin vase
- Utisz

== Literature ==
The pioneering study on the matter is an academic dissertation, unpublished to this day: Anita Joplin, The Anthropomorphic Landscape: A Study in 16th Century Imagery (unpublished thesis, Reed College), 1974.

=== On anthropomorphic landscapes ===
- Fernand Hallyn, "Le paysage anthropomorphe", Yves Giraud (ed.), Le Paysage à la Renaissance, Fribourg: Editions universitaires de Fribourg, 1988, pp. 43 ss.
- Michel Weemans & Jean-Hubert Martin (eds.), Le paysage anthropomorphe à la Renaissance (international conference proceedings, 2009), Paris: Réunion des musées nationaux, (awatiting publication).
- Michel Weemans, "Herri met de Bles’s sleeping peddler: an exegetical and anthropomorphic landscape", The Art Bulletin, Vol. 88, Iss. 3, pp. 459–481.
- Andreas Hauser, « Andrea Mantegnas ‘Wolkenreiter’: Manifestationen von kunstloser Natur oder Ursprung von vexierbildhafter Kunst ? », Gerhart von Graevenitz, Stefan Rieger, Felix Thürlemann (eds.), Die Unvermeidlichkeit der Bilder, Tübingen, 2001, pp. 147-172.
- Omar Calabrese (2006): Artists' Self-Portraits, ISBN 978-0-7892-0894-1 (The book has a chapter on artists who hide self-portraits in their pictures: e.g. Leonardo da Vinci, Michelangelo, Rembrandt, van Gogh, Munch, Dalí, Albrecht Dürer, Velàzquez, Elisabeth Vigée-Lebrun, Ingres, Degas, Toulouse-Lautrec, Gainsborough, Matisse, James Ensor, Egon Schiele, Frida Kahlo, Man Ray, Henry Moore, Robert Rauschenberg, Norman Rockwell, and Roy Lichtenstein.)

=== On crypto-images more broadly ===
- Walter Melion, Bret Rothstein, Michel Weemans (eds.), The Anthropomorphic Lens: Anthropomorphism, Microcosmism and Analogy in Early Modern Thought and Visual Arts, Leiden: Brill, 2015.
- Jean-Hubert Martin (ed.), Une image peut en cacher une autre - Arcimboldo, Dalí, Raetz (exhibition catalogue), Paris: Galeries nationales du Grand Palais, 2009. ISBN 978-2-7118-5586-5
- Jean-Hubert Martin, Stephan Andreae (eds.), Das endlose Rätsel. Dalí und die Magier der Mehrdeutigkeit (exhibition catalogue, Düsseldorf, Museum Kunst Palast), Ostfildern-Ruit, 2003.
- Dario Gamboni, Potential images: ambiguity and indeterminacy in modern art, London: Reaktion, 2002.
- Jean-Claude Lebensztejn, L'art de la tache: Introduction à la Nouvelle methode d'Alexander Cozens, Paris: Éditions du Limon, 1990.
- Jean-Didier Urbain, "La crypto-image ou le palimpseste iconique", Eidos, 5, 1991, p. 1-16, et

=== On chance images ===
- Horst W. Janson, "The ‘Image made by Chance’ in Renaissance Thought", Millard Meiss (ed.), De Artibus opuscula XL. Essays in Honor of Erwin Panofsky, New York, 1961, I, pp. 254– 266, II, pp. 87–88.
- Horst Woldemar: "Chance Images", in: Dictionary of the History of Ideas. Studies of Selected Pivotal Ideas, ed. Philip P. Wiener, vol. 1, New York 1973, pp. 340-353.
