= Last Letters from Hav =

1985 novel by Jan Morris

Last Letters From Hav
- Author: Jan Morris
- Language: English
- Genre: Science fiction
- Publisher: Random House
- Publication date: 1985
- Publication place: United Kingdom
- Media type: Print (Paperback & Hardback)
- Pages: 203 (paperback and hardcover edition)
- ISBN: 978-0-394-53262-2 (hardcover edition)
- OCLC: 11518595
- Followed by: Hav of the Myrmidons

Last Letters from Hav is a Booker Prize-shortlisted 1985 novel by Welsh writer Jan Morris. Last Letters from Hav was republished in 2006 together with Hav of the Myrmidons and an introduction by Ursula K. Le Guin in a collected volume entitled Hav.

== Plot summary ==
Last Letters from Hav is a narrative account of the author's six-month visit to the fictional country of Hav. The novel is written in the form of travel literature. It begins with the author being sent to the city on an assignment from the New Gotham Magazine. Hav itself is imagined to be a cosmopolitan small independent peninsula located somewhere in the eastern Mediterranean.

The novel is episodic, with no overarching plot. But contains several episodes describing the author's subjective experience in Hav. A string of evocative episodes include visiting a languid casino, meeting a courteous man claiming to be the true Caliph, watching a city-wide roof race, and a visit to the mysterious British agency.

The novel concludes with an invited visit to a strange ritual conclave where the author observes several cowled men, whom she thinks she might recognise as her acquaintances in Hav. She then recounts the rise of strange and ill-defined tensions in the country, and decides to leave amidst growing unrest. On the last line of the novel the author writes that she could, from the train station, see warships approaching on the horizon.

== Genre ==
Last Letters from Hav and its sequel Hav of the Myrmidons are works of imaginative fiction. The similarity in style to travel literature and the evocative nature of the fiction make genre classification difficult. However Ursula K. Le Guin notes in her introduction to the collected volume Hav that the work is clearly a work of science fiction as it uses imaginative fiction to address issues raised by the social sciences.

== Reception ==
Upon publication the work received a generally positive reception with reviewers noting the genre confusion with travel literature and Jan Morris's history as a travel writer herself. Following the publication there were reports of travel agents being contacted for information on how to travel to Hav. Morris claimed someone had contacted the Royal Geographical Society asking for information on how to reach Hav.

Upon publication of Last Letters from Hav in the compilation volume Hav, the reviews of the work along with its companion Hav of the Myrmidons were overwhelmingly positive. The New York Review of Books described the book as "... dazzlingly sui-generis, part erudite travel memoir, part speculative fiction, part cautionary political tale. It transports the reader to an extraordinary place that never was, but could well be."

== Awards and nominations ==
Last Letters from Hav was shortlisted for the Booker Prize for Fiction in 1985.
