= Conundrum (Morris memoir) =

1974 memoir by Jan Morris

Conundrum (1974) is a memoir by Welsh author Jan Morris (1926-2020). The book covers her childhood, career, and later gender transition. It was published by Faber & Faber.

== Plot summary ==
Conundrum is an memoir by Jan Morris that covers her life and later gender transition. It begins with the opening line “I was three or perhaps four years old when I realized that I had been born into the wrong body, and should really be a girl.” Morris details her education at Christ Church Cathedral, Oxford and Lancing College, where she went on to have several homosexual relationships. She covered her experiences in the 9th Queen's Royal Lancers. After she left the military, she discovered Lili Elbe's book, Man Into Woman: An Authentic Record of a Change of Sex.

After discovering that she was transgender, Morris visited a variety of Harley Street doctors, seeking gender-affirming health care. Some doctors suggested she may be a crossdresser or gay, both assertions which Morris strongly disagreed with. Morris later met Dr. Harry Benjamin in New York, who explained that Gender-affirming hormone therapy could help Morris, but advised Morris to continue trying to live as a man due to the social stigma. Morris obtained estrogen from a doctor in London, but remembering Benjamin's warnings, decided to flush it down the toilet.

Morris discusses her struggles with relationships, before detailing how she met Elizabeth, whom she went on to marry and have 5 children with. She was open with Elizabeth about her longing to be a woman, which grew every year. Afraid that hormones might affect her fertility, Morris vowed to wait until Elizabeth was fulfilled as a mother. Meanwhile, Morris worked for the The Guardian, and then The Times, where she was assigned to accompany the 1953 British Mount Everest expedition.

In 1964, Morris began taking estrogen prescribed by Dr Benjamin. Over the next two years her body became more feminine. In order to undergo gender-affirming surgery, she was required to live as a woman, and began living as Jan in Oxford. In 1972, she spoke to a surgeon at Charing Cross Hospital, who refused to operate until Morris divorced Elizabeth. Refusing to divorce her, Morris instead visited an unnamed doctor in Casablanca, Morocco, to undergo a vaginoplasty in July 1972. She spent two weeks in Casablanca recovering from surgery with other transgender patients. On Morris' return to the UK she underwent two further surgeries in England to complete her transition.

== Reception ==
The Sunday Times published extracts of the book in the weeks leading up to Conundrum's publication. Conundrum was a worldwide bestseller upon its release, with Morris participating in a televised interview with Robert Robinson on The Book Programme.

Reviews were mixed, with Nora Ephron calling Conundrum "mawkish and embarrassing", and Rebecca West calling Morris "a man’s idea of a woman." In 2002, The Observer claimed that the book was "denounced as morally repugnant" upon its publication but proclaimed it was one of her finest books.

Transgender readers praised the book. Debbie Hayton called it revelatory, due to its being published at a time when very few transgender stories were being told. Stephanie Burt called the book validating and noted it was an early example of the wrong-body narrative.

In 2019, Conundrum featured on The New York Times' "50 Best Memoirs of the Past 50 Years" list.
