= Jan Morris =

Welsh historian and travel writer (1926–2020)

Jan Morris CBE FRSL
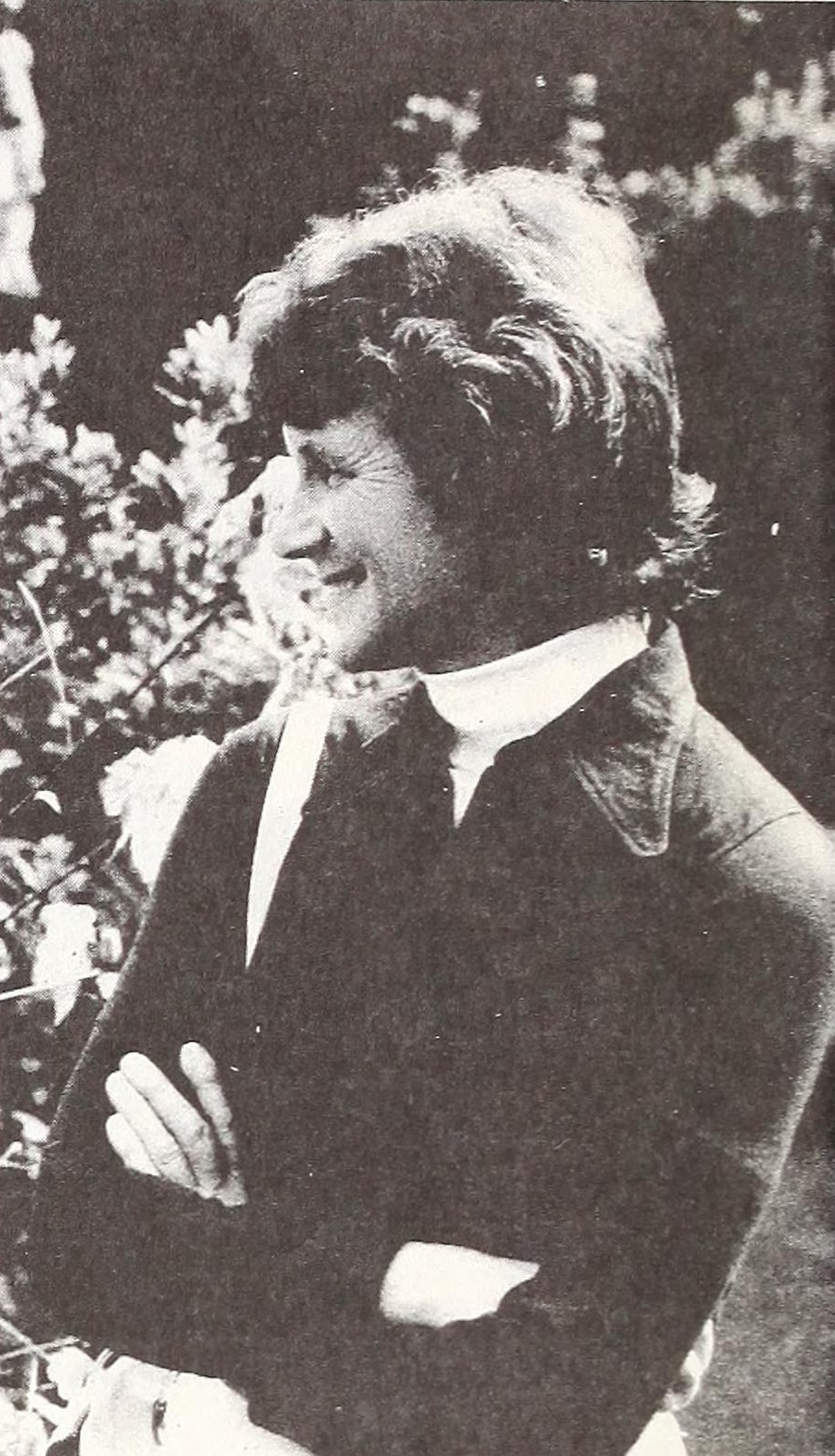
- Morris, c. 1975
- Born: James Humphry Morris; 2 October 1926; Clevedon, Somerset, England
- Died: 20 November 2020 (aged 94); Pwllheli, Wales
- Education: Christ Church, Oxford
- Occupation: Writer
- Spouse: Elizabeth Tuckniss (m. 1949)
- Children: 5
- Writing career
- Genres: Non-fiction, travel writing

Catharine Jan Morris CBE FRSL (born James Humphry Morris; 2 October 1926 – 20 November 2020) was a Welsh historian, author and travel writer. She was known particularly for the Pax Britannica trilogy (1968–1978), a history of the British Empire, and for portraits of cities, including Oxford, Venice, Trieste, Hong Kong and New York City. She published under her birth name until 1972, when she had gender reassignment surgery, transitioning from male to female.

Morris was a member of the 1953 British Mount Everest expedition, which made the first ever confirmed ascent of the mountain. She was the only journalist to accompany the expedition, climbing with the team to a camp at 22,000 feet, and using a prearranged code to send news of the successful ascent, which was announced in The Times on the day of Queen Elizabeth II's coronation, 2 June 1953.

== Background and education ==
Morris was born in Clevedon, Somerset, on 2 October 1926. She was the youngest of three children of Walter Henry Morris (died 1938), an engineer from Monmouth, Wales, who never fully recovered after being gassed in the First World War. Her mother, née Enid Payne, was an English church organist who trained as a concert pianist at the Leipzig Conservatory. Enid was a well-known recitalist in the early days of broadcasting in south Wales and the west of England. Morris's elder brothers Gareth (1920–2007) and Christopher (1922–2014) both achieved distinction, as a flautist and as an organist and music publisher for the Oxford University Press, respectively.

Morris was a chorister in the choir of Christ Church Cathedral, Oxford, while boarding at Christ Church Cathedral School, then went on to study at Lancing College, returning to Christ Church, Oxford, as an undergraduate, and taking a second-class honours BA in 1951, which was promoted to the customary Oxford MA in 1961. While at Lancing, aged 16, Morris made a start in journalism, reporting for Western Daily Press, and while an Oxford student wrote for Cherwell, the university's student newspaper. Despite being born and largely raised in England, Morris always identified as Welsh.

== Career ==
Initially, Morris hoped to join the Royal Navy, only to be prevented due to colour blindness. Instead, she joined a Cavalry regiment during the closing stages of the Second World War, serving in the 9th Queen's Royal Lancers, and being posted to the Free Territory of Trieste in 1945, during the joint British–American occupation. She eventually went on to serve as regimental intelligence officer.

Morris wrote for The Times and in 1953 was the only journalist accompanying the 1953 British Mount Everest expedition, which included Edmund Hillary and Tenzing Norgay, who were the first to scale Mount Everest. Morris reported the success of Hillary and Tenzing in a coded message to the newspaper, "Snow conditions bad stop advanced base abandoned yesterday stop awaiting improvement", and by coincidence the scoop was published in The Times on the morning of the coronation of Elizabeth II. The message was initially interpreted to mean that Tom Bourdillon and Tenzing had reached the summit, but the first name was corrected before the story was broken. Claims that the news was held back ignore the communication problems of the time; it was quite an achievement to get the news of the 29 May ascent to London by Coronation Day on 2 June, as it had to be sent to Namche Bazaar by runner.

Reporting from Cyprus on the Suez Crisis for the Manchester Guardian in 1956, Morris produced the first "irrefutable proof" of collusion between France and Israel in the invasion of Egyptian territory, interviewing French Air Force pilots who confirmed that they had been in action in support of Israeli forces. She also reported on the 1961 trial of Adolf Eichmann in Jerusalem. Later, Morris opposed the Falklands War.

== Personal life ==
In 1949, Morris married Elizabeth, daughter of Ceylon tea planter Austen Cecil Tuckniss; they had five children together, including the poet and musician Twm Morys; one died in infancy. They lived in the village of Llanystumdwy, in North Wales, for over 50 years - first, in a large Georgian house, Plas Trefan, and latterly in a converted stable block, Trefan Morys, on the grounds - until Morris's death in November 2020.

Morris began transitioning to live as a woman in 1964, one of the first high-profile people to do so. In 1972, Morris travelled to Morocco to undergo gender-affirming surgery, performed by surgeon Georges Burou, because doctors in Britain refused to allow the procedure unless Morris and Tuckniss divorced, something Morris was not prepared to do. They did divorce later, but remained together, and on 14 May 2008 were legally reunited when they formally entered into a civil partnership. She detailed her transition in Conundrum (1974), her first book under her new name, and one of the first autobiographies to discuss a personal gender reassignment. (Note: The opening lines of Conundrum: "I was three or perhaps four years old when I realized that I had been born into the wrong body, and should really be a girl. I remember the moment well, and it is the earliest memory of my life.")

Morris died on 20 November 2020 at Ysbyty Bryn Beryl (Bryn Beryl Hospital) in Pwllheli in North Wales, at the age of 94, survived by Elizabeth and their four children.

Her wife Elizabeth died at age 99 on 17 June 2024.

== Awards ==
Morris received honorary doctorates from the University of Wales and the University of Glamorgan, was an honorary fellow of Christ Church, Oxford, and was a fellow of the Royal Society of Literature. She was elected to the Gorsedd Cymru in 1992, and received the Glyndŵr Award for Outstanding Contribution to the Arts in Wales in 1996.

"Out of polite respect" she accepted her appointment as Commander of the Order of the British Empire (CBE) in the 1999 Birthday Honours for services to literature, but Morris was a Welsh nationalist republican at heart. In 2005, she was awarded the Golden PEN Award by English PEN for "a Lifetime's Distinguished Service to Literature". In January 2008, The Times named her the 15th-greatest British writer since the War. She has featured in the Pinc List of leading Welsh LGBT figures in 2017. She won the 2018 Edward Stanford Outstanding Contribution to Travel Writing Award.

== Works ==
Morris's 1974 best-selling memoir Conundrum documented her transition and was compared to that of transgender pioneer Christine Jorgensen (A Personal Autobiography). Later memoirs included Pleasures of a Tangled Life (1989) and Herstory (1999). She also wrote many essays on travel and her life, and published a collection of her diary entries as In My Mind's Eye in 2019.

Morris wrote many books on travel, notably about Venice and Trieste. Her Pax Britannica trilogy, on the history of the British Empire, received praise. In an interview with the BBC in 2016, she told Michael Palin that she did not like to be described as a travel writer, for her books were not about movement and journeys; they were about places and people. Morris's 1985 novel Last Letters from Hav, an "imagined travelogue and political thriller" was shortlisted for that year's Booker Prize.

In 1995, Morris completed a biography of First Sea Lord John Fisher, 1st Baron Fisher, entitled Fisher's Face. She began researching the life of the Admiral in the 1950s, describing the several-decades-long project as a "jeu d’amour" (love game).
