= Benno Geiger =

Austrian art historian

Benno Geiger (pseudonym: Egon E. Nerbig, born 21 February 1882 in Rodaun near Vienna; died 26 July 1965 in Venice) was an Austrian art historian, art dealer, writer and translator, and member of the Nazi Party.

== Early life ==
Benno Geiger was the son of the painter Pauline Geiger and grandson of the doctor Georg Julius von Schultz. He spent the first years of his life with his mother and her sister Ella Adaïewsky in Venice. From 1884 to 1889 he lived with relatives in the Livonian village of Dorpat. He attended school in Venice and then a commercial college. From 1901 he studied art history, music and German at the University of Leipzig and the University of Berlin. In 1910 he received his doctorate in philosophy at the University of Berlin with a thesis on the painter Maffeo Verona. From 1910 to 1914 he worked as an assistant at the Kaiser Friedrich Museum in Berlin.

Geiger later stayed mainly in Venice, working as freelance writer and art dealer in Italian art. He had contacts with Rainer Maria Rilke, Hugo von Hofmannsthal and Stefan Zweig. He was expelled from the Italian Ministry of the Interior in 1931 after which he then stayed in Oppenau / Black Forest, Switzerland and France.

== Nazi-era 1933-1945 ==
Geiger was a member of Hitler's Nazi Party (NSDAP). In 1935 Geiger returned to Venice. In November 1938 he was involved in the Aryanization of three watercolors by Rudolf von Alt and four watercolors by Jakob Alt from the property of the Viennese lawyer Norbert Klinger. Since father and son Alt were among Hitler's favorite artists, Geiger also took artworks from Rudolf von Alts' daughter. In 1942 and 1943 he accompanied Franz Kieslinger and Kajetan Mühlmann, director of the Nazi art looting organisation known as the Dienststelle Mühlmann, on their "procurement" campaigns in Italy. Their relations are under study by art historians.

After the end of the Second World War Geiger lived again in Venice. Geiger, a Nazi, was investigated by the Art Looting Investigation Unit and placed on the Red Flag List of Names for his involvement in dealing in looted art.

The Gurlitt stash of artworks found in the home of the son of Hitler's art dealer Hildebrand Gurlitt included three artworks that had previously belonged to Benno Geiger.

== Postwar activities ==
In addition to essays on art history, Benno Geiger mainly wrote poems that were strongly influenced by his impressions in his adopted country of Italy and for which he often used classical forms. He also translated Dante and Petrarca into German. In 1959, he received the Johann Heinrich Voss Prize for Translation from the German Academy for Language and Poetry in Darmstadt for his translation work.

== Honors ==
Geiger's daughter, Elsa Geiger Ariè, set up the “Benno Geiger” scholarship for studies on literary archives. "The Giorgio Cini Foundation offers one 3-month residential scholarship to enable studies focused on the Benno Geiger Archive, which is preserved and developed on the Island of San Giorgio, as well as on other literary archives held by the Foundation".

== Writings ==
- Ein Sommeridyll, Berlin-Charlottenburg 1904
- Lieblose Gesänge, Berlin 1907
- Maffeo Verona (1574-1618) und seine Werke für die Markuskirche zu Venedig, Dissertation Berlin 1910
- Gesammelte Gedichte, Leipzig 1914
- Das Fenster in der Mitternacht, Leipzig 1919
- Sämtliche Gedichte, Wien 1925
- Die Ferienreise, Florenz 1929
- Der fünfzigste Geburtstag, Bern 1932
- Werke, Zürich [u. a.]
  - 1. Idyllen oder Die Gedichte in Terzinen, 1939
- Also sprach Benno Geiger, Venedig 1947
- Handzeichnungen alter Meister, Zürich [u. a.] 1948
- Sämtliche Gedichte, Florenz
  - 1. Idyllen, Lieder, Gesänge, 1958
  - 2. Kantaten, Mythen, Oden, 1958
  - 3. Legenden, Hymnen, Zeit- und Streitgedichte, 1958
- Memorie di un Veneziano. Florenz 1958; Treviso 2009
- Die skurrilen Gemälde des Giuseppe Arcimboldi (1527-1593), Wiesbaden 1960
- Bestiarium hominis sapientis, das ist eine kurze Kultur- und Kunstgeschichte der Gegenwart. Aus dem Nachlaß des Dichters Benno Geiger hrsg. von Egon E. Nerbig. Halbinsel-Verlag, Lugdunum 1965

Editing and Publishing

- Novalis: Noten am Rande der Kunst in Novalis' Schriften, Leipzig 1901
- Alessandro Magnasco: Alessandro Magnasco, Berlin 1914

Translations

- Dante Alighieri: Die göttliche Komödie, Darmstadt [u. a.]
  - 1. Die Hölle, 1960
  - 2. Das Fegefeuer, 1960
  - 3. Das Paradies, 1961
- Giovanni Pascoli: Die ausgewählten Gedichte, Leipzig 1913
- Francesco Petrarca: Die Triumphe, Wien 1935
- Francesco Petrarca: Der Canzoniere, Zürich [u. a.] 1937
- Francesco Petrarca: Das lyrische Werk, Darmstadt [u. a.] 1958

== Literature ==
- Leo Planiscig, Hermann Voss: Handzeichnungen alter Meister aus der Sammlung Dr. Benno Geiger, mit einem Vorwort von Hugo von Hofmannsthal. Amalthea, Zürich / Leipzig / Wien 1920.
- Gabriella Rovagnati: Zwischen Rodaun und Venedig. Die doppelte Seele Benno Geigers. In: Jeanne Benay (Hrsg.): Österreichische Satire (1933–2000). Exil, Remigration, Assimilation. Lang, Bern 2003, ISBN 3-03910-090-4, S. 129–144.
- Francesco Zambon, Elsa Geiger Ariè (Hrsg.): Benno Geiger e la cultura italiana. Leo Olschki Editore, Florenz 2007, ISBN 978-88-222-5586-0.
- Marco Meli, Elsa Geiger Arié (Hrsg.): Benno Geiger e la cultura europea (Collana Linea veneta. Band 21). Leo Olschki Editore, Florenz 2010, ISBN 978-88-222-6033-8.
- Meike Hopp: Kunsthandel im Nationalsozialismus: Adolf Weinmüller in München und Wien. Böhlau, Köln/Weimar/Wien 2012, ISBN 3-412-20807-8.
