= Johanna Margarethe Stern =

German Jewish art collector and Holocaust victim (1874–1944)

Johanna Margarethe Stern-Lippmann (6 January 1874 in Berlin – 22 May 1944 in Auschwitz) was a German Jewish art collector and victim of the Holocaust.

== Life ==
From 1918 Margarethe Stern (née Lippmann) lived with her husband the businessman and art collector Siegbert Samuel Stern, founder of Grauman & Stern, in Neubabelsberg, Potsdam. The couple had four children between 1899 and 1909. The couple lived on the Griebnitzsee in the prestigious Villa Stern, in Kaiserstraße 3 (today Karl-Marx-Straße).

=== Nazi persecution and murder ===
When the Nazis came to power in 1933, the couple was persecuted because of their Jewish origins. Siegbert Stern died in Berlin on 7 August 1935. In the spring of 1937, Margarethe Stern fled, first to Badenweiler, then in the summer of 1938 via Switzerland to Amsterdam, where her brother-in-law Albert Stern was already based.

Hitler's race laws targeted Jews, throwing them out of work, banning them from owning businesses and imposing special confiscatory fees and taxes that obliged them to sell assets to survive. Margarethe Stern was forced to sell the Villa Stern in November 1940, although its unclear whether she received any of the proceeds.

In May 1940, the National Socialists occupied the Netherlands. Margarethe Stern tried to obtain an exit visa for herself and some family members by handing over a painting by the artist Henri Fantin-Latour to the Nazi looting organisation, called the Dienststelle Mühlmann. The exit visas were still not issued.

Stern-Lippmann went into hiding, but was arrested in April 1943 and deported to Auschwitz where she was murdered on 22 May 1944. Her daughter Louise Henriette and her husband died with her. Margarethe Stern-Lippmann's other children survived the war.

=== Restitution claims for artworks ===
The painting by Henri Fantin-Latour was returned to the heirs of Margarethe Stern in 1949.

After the fall of the Berlin Wall in 1989, the Villa Stern was restored with the aid of the Jewish Claims Conference.

In 2006 negotiations were held about the return of one of the 144 paintings owned by the Stern family, which had ended up in a museum in Karlsruhe, Germany, after being looted in 1942. The Circumcision by Jan Baegert, also called the Master of Cappenberg, was returned following a decision by the Dutch Restitutions Committee.

In 2014 a search report was published by the German Lost Art Foundation regarding a painting by Max Liebermann, Reiter am Strande, owned by the Stern family.

In 2018, the Dutch Restitutions Committee reviewed a claim involving Wassily Kandinsky's painting Blick auf Murnau mit Kirche, which was part of the collection of the Van Abbemuseum in Eindhoven. The family complained to the Dutch culture minister about the 'careless' mistakes and a lack of empathy. In 2022, responding to international criticism, the Dutch Restitutons Committee reversed its earlier decision and recommended that the Kandinsky be restituted to Stern's heirs.

Searches for more than one hundred artworks continue today.

== See also ==
- The Holocaust
- Nazi plunder
- The Holocaust in the Netherlands
- List of claims for restitution for Nazi-looted art
