= Franz Kieslinger =

Austrian art historian

Franz Kieslinger (16 November 1891 in Vienna – 18 January 1955) was an Austrian art historian and art dealer, who was a Nazi and involved in art theft during the Nazi era.

== Life ==
Kieslinger was born on 16 November 1891 in Vienna, the son of the Ministerialrat Ing. Franz Kieslinger. He studied art history at the University of Vienna from 1911 to 1914 under Josef Strzygowski and Max Dvořák. From 1913 to 1915, he was an associate member of the Institute for Austrian Historical Research. He was then a soldier in World War I and was severely wounded as a first lieutenant in the Piave battles. He was awarded a doctorate in the history of stained glass in 1919 and as an art expert for the Vienna Dorotheum. Inventoried, among other things, the art collection of Fritz Grünbaum. He published his dissertation as a book and wrote catalog texts for exhibitions and for auction

== Nazi-era (1933 to 1945) ==
After the annexation of Austria by Hitler's Third Reich on 12 March 1938, Jews were removed from the art trade and their businesses transferred to non-Jews. Kieslinger joined the Nazi party on 1 May 1938 (membership number 7.683.103).

In September 1938, Kieslinger became the managing director of the Aryanized art dealership S. Kende. The previous Jewish owners, Herbert Alexander Kende (1908-1977) and Melanie Kende (born 1872), the youngest child and the widow, respectively, of Samuel Kende, were replaced, as dictated by Nazi policy, by a non-Jewish owner, Munich art dealer Adolf Weinmüller, for whom Kieslinger then worked. After the Nazis deported the Jewish collector Fritz Grünbaum to Dachau in May 1938, Kieslinger inventoried Grünbaum's art collection in July 1938, including 81 works by Egon Schiele, many of which would be the subject of restitution claims after the war.

In the spring of 1940, Kieslinger followed Nazi SS Colonel Kajetan Mühlmann, for whom he had already worked in Vienna and who had in the meantime organized the art theft in occupied Poland, to the occupied Netherlands. He worked for Mühlmann's Nazi looting organisation, "Dienststelle Mühlmann," and was appointed by the Reich Commissar for the Netherlands, Arthur Seyß-Inquart, as the "collective administrator" for the art objects confiscated from "enemy property" which generally meant from Jews. Kieslinger inventoried the Fritz Mannheimer art collection which the Dienststelle Mühlmann sold to the highest Nazi officials, the German auction houses Lange and Weinmüller and the Viennese auction house, the Dorotheum. The Mannheimer collection would also be the object of research and restitution claims after the war.

== Postwar ==
The Office of Strategic Services Art Looting Investigation Unit placed Kieslinger on their Red Flag List of Names, describing him as a "With Plietzsch, chief professional member of the Dienststelle Muehlmann; chiefly active in Holland, also occasionally in France and Italy. Catalogued the Mannheimer Collection. Believed to have been interrogated by the Dutch services."

Kieslinger's fate after the defeat of the Nazis is unclear. Little is known about his denazification. He continued to work as a court-certified art expert and art dealer, advising, among others, art collector Rudolf Leopold.

== Restitution cases ==
Several artworks that passed through Kieslinger have been the objects of claims for restitution from Jewish families.

Research into his involvement in looting Jewish collection during the Nazi era is ongoing.

His younger brother, Alois, was a geologist. Alois compiled his brother's list of publications.

== Writings (selection) ==
- Glasmalerei in Österreich, ein Abriß ihrer Geschichte, Wien: Hölzel, 1922
- Die mittelalterliche Plastik in Österreich. Ein Umriß ihrer Geschichte, Wien: Österr. Bundesverlag f. Unterr., Wiss. u. Kunst, 1926
- Gotische Glasmalerei in Österreich bis 1450, Wien: Amalthea-Verlag, 1928
- Der plastische Schmuck des Westportales bei den Minoriten in Wien, Wien: Selbstverl., 1928
- Mittelalterliche Skulpturen einer Wiener Sammlung, Wien: Gerlach & Wiedling, 1937
- Freiwillige Versteigerung einer vornehmen Wohnungsrichtung (Möbel, Gemälde, Porzellan, Silber, Teppiche usw.) am 7. u. 8. Nov. 1940 ... im Haus Rennweg Nr 3 ... Katalog Nr 12 / [F. Kieslinger], Wien: Wiener Kunstversteigerungshaus A. Weinmüller 1940 dnb
- Unser Dom. Bemerkungen über sein mittelalterl. Werden u. seine Schöpfer. Zum österr. Katholikentag 1952, Wien: Österreichische Staatsdruckerei, 1952
- Unbekanntes am bekanntesten Orte: Deutung des einzig erhaltenen Lunetten-Mosaiks an der Front des Markusdomes über der Porta Alipio, Wien: Gerold & Co., 1954

== Literature ==
- Alois Kieslinger: Veröffentlichungen von Franz Kieslinger (1891–1955). Wien I, Schönlaterngasse 5: Dr. A. Kieslinger, 1955
- Alexandra Caruso: Raub in geordneten Verhältnissen, in: Gabriele Anderl / Alexandra Caruso (Hrsg.), NS-Kunstraub in Österreich und die Folgen, StudienVerlag, Innsbruck – Wien – Bozen 2005, S. 90 ff.
- Meike Hopp: Kunsthandel im Nationalsozialismus: Adolf Weinmüller in München und Wien. Böhlau, Köln/Weimar/Wien 2012, also Dissertation at the Ludwig-Maximilians-Universität München 2011, ISBN 978-3-412-20807-3, S. 241–250; S. 272–293

== Links ==
- Literature by and about Franz Kieslinger in the German National Library catalogue
- Gabriele Anderl: „… ein schwerreicher Kunsthändler aus München“: Die „Arisierung“ des Kunstantiquariats und Auktionshauses S. Kende in Wien durch Adolph Weinmüller, aus: David. Jüdische Kulturzeitschrift, Juni 2006
- The Kieslinger Inventory
