= Michael Berolzheimer =

German businessman (1866–1942)

Michael Berolzheimer (born January 22, 1866, in Fürth; died June 5, 1942, in Mount Vernon, New York) was a German entrepreneur, lawyer and art collector.

== Life ==
Michael Berolzheimer was a son of the Fürth pencil manufacturer Heinrich Berolzheimer. After studying law, he worked as a lawyer for clients such as the Pinakothek in Munich and the German Orient Society. In 1902, he married Melitta Schweisheimer (* 1867), née Dispecker, and in 1904 moved with her and their two children to Untergrainau near Garmisch-Partenkirchen.

An art collector, Berolzheimer became an expert in graphic art. In 1895, he bought the Boguslaw Jolles collection at auction from Hugo Helbing. He joined the Munich Museum Society, founded in 1905, and was elected its treasurer. As a member of the acquisition committee of the Alte Pinakothek and the Staatliche Graphische Sammlung, he helped shape the development of their collections. He raised funds for the acquisitions of these museums and himself established a foundation for the benefit of the Bayerische Staatsgemäldesammlungen.

Berolzheimer collected prints and eventually owned about 600 pieces of graphic art as well as about 800 hand drawings by Dutch, Italian Baroque painters and from the German Romantic period, including an oil sketch of the Poor Poet by Carl Spitzweg.

== Nazi persecution ==
After the Nazis came to power in Germany in 1933, Berolzheimer was persecuted as a Jew. In 1938, he fled to the USA via Switzerland in 1938. He was obliged to abandon the collection of hand drawings, which had been declared a national cultural asset by Ernst Wengenmayr, an associate of the Munich art dealer Adolf Weinmüller, who specialized in Aryanization. Berolzheimer's stepson Robert Schweisheimer was forced to contract with Weinmüller who auctioned paintings and sculptures in 1938; the auction of the graphic art followed in March 1939. Berolzheimer received nothing from the proceeds of the auctions. After the Nazi attacks on Jews on Kristallnacht in November 1938, a special Jewish property levy of 80,000 RM was imposed on the Berolzheimer family. Berolzheimer's real estate in Grainau was also aryanized, that is, transferred to a non-Jewish owner.

== Claims for restitution ==
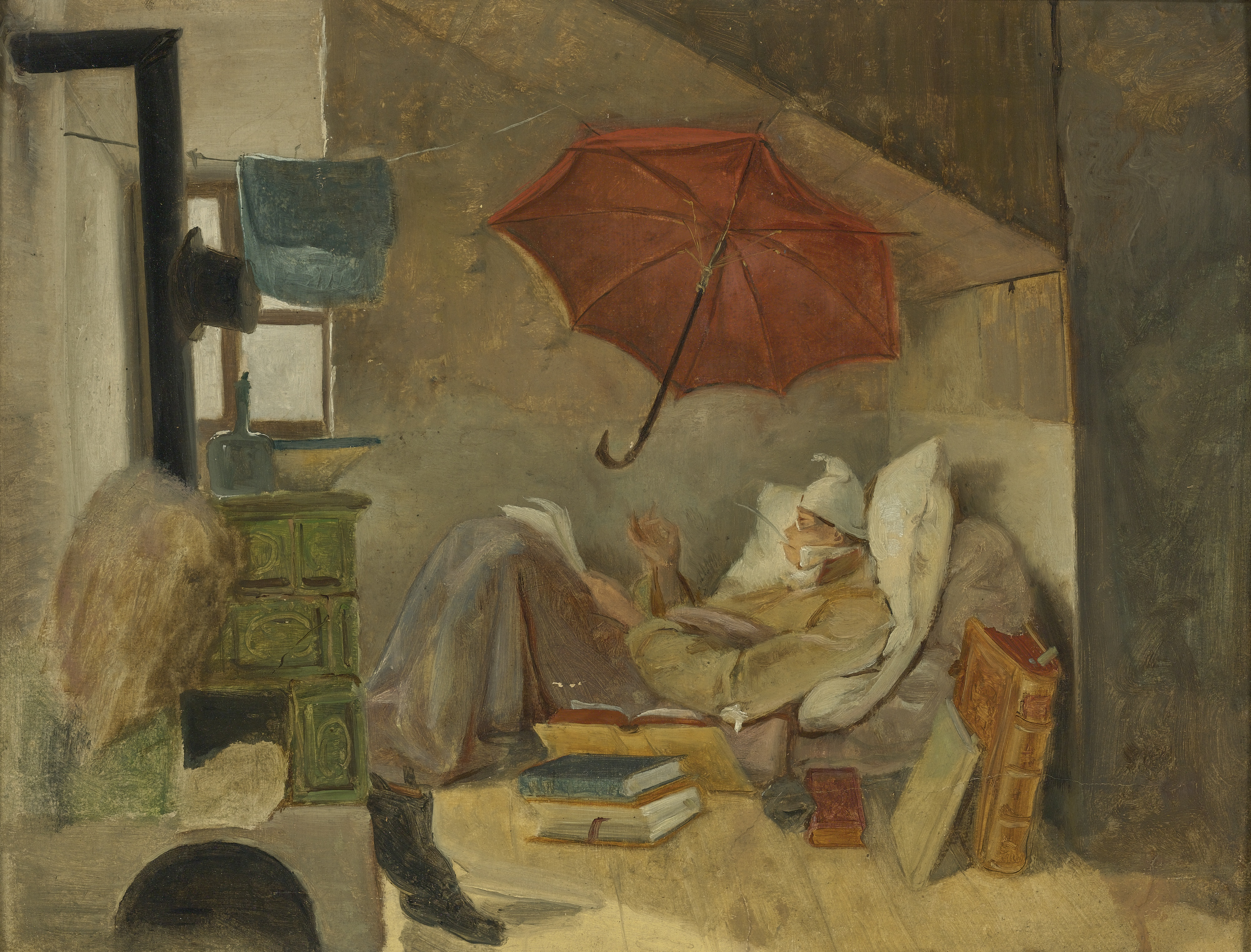
The poor poet (sketch)

After the end of the war, Berolzheimer's heirs sought the return of the looted art objects, which began in 1950 with the transfer of a dozen prints, including sheets by Bonaventura Genelli, from the Städtische Galerie im Lenbachhaus, followed by returns from the Germanisches Nationalmuseum in Nuremberg and the Kurpfälzisches Museum in Heidelberg, but the initiatives petered out with the refusal of the Albertina in Vienna.

After the Washington Declaration on Looted Art in 1998, the family renewed its efforts. After the legal succession among the heirs was finally clarified in 2009, the Albertina returned 29 drawings in 2010 that it had purchased at auction in 1939. The Kupferstichkabinett Berlin returned 28 drawings.

In 2013, a 1834 pen-and-ink portrait of a geographer by Reinier Craeyvanger was restituted by a Dutch antiquarian bookseller who had purchased it at a Sotheby's auction in 2005. The Kunsthalle Bremen in Germany returned a drawing it acquired in 1941 attributed to the 17th century Italian artist Giacomo Cavedone.

In 2016 the Metropolitan Museum of Art reached a settlement with the Berolzheimer heirs for anamorphic drawing of a stag which had been gifted to the museum by Janos Scholz.

== Writings ==
- Oscar und Cäcilie Graf, Maler-Radierer : Katalog ihres radierten, lithographierten und monotypierten Werkes. München: Helbing, 1903

== Literature ==
- Michael G. Berolzheimer (Hrsg.): Michael Berolzheimer: 1866 - 1942; his life and legacy. M. G. Berolzheimer, Stockton, Calif. 2014, ISBN 978-3-00-047128-5
- Ira Mazzoni: Vertrieben. Stück für Stück wird die Sammlung des Mäzens wieder rekonstruiert. Rezension. In: Süddeutsche Zeitung, 14. Februar 2015, S. 23.
- Galerie Arnoldi-Livie: 29 drawings from the Michael Berolzheimer Collection restituted by the Albertina. Galerie Arnoldi-Livie, Wien 2010.
- Galerie Arnoldi-Livie: Michael Berolzheimer Collection II: 24 drawings restituted by the Kupferstichkabinett Berlin. München 2012.

== Links ==
- Literature by and about Michael Berolzheimer in the German National Library catalogue
- Berolzheimer, Dr. Michael, im Verzeichnis Jüdische Sammler und Kunsthändler (Opfer nationalsozialistischer Verfolgung und Enteignung), bei Lost Art
