= János Scholz =

American cellist and art collector

- Born: December 20, 1903; Sopron, Hungary
- Died: June 3, 1993 (aged 89); New York City, U.S.
- Education: Franz Liszt Academy of Music
- Occupations: Cellist, art collector
- Spouses: Anne Bigelow Rosen; Helen Marshall Schelling
- Children: 3 sons

János Scholz (December 20, 1903 – June 3, 1993) was a Hungarian-born American cellist and art collector.

== Early life ==
Scholz was born in 1903 in Sopron, Hungary. He graduated from the Franz Liszt Academy of Music in Budapest.

== Career ==
Scholz began playing the cello with the Budapest Symphony Orchestra. He joined the Roth Quartet in 1932. By 1933, he was a cellist in New York City. He became "one of the great cellists of the twentieth century." He also taught at Columbia University and New York University.

Scholz began his Italian Art collection in 1935, which grew to 1500 drawings. Representing drawings of both major and minor artists of Italy they are noted for the quality of individual works and the comprehensive nature. In 1973, he donated the works, including "drawings by Pisanello, Veronese, Titian, Guercino, and Piranesi", to Morgan Library & Museum.

Scholz conducted seminars for New York University Institute of Fine Arts, Columbia University and the New School for Social Research, providing rare first-hand contact with works through his collection. Many exhibitions were organized in the U.S., Canada and Italy.

== Personal life and death ==
Scholz was married twice. His first wife was Anne Bigelow Rosen. His second wife, Helen Marshall Schelling, was the widow of conductor Ernest Schelling. They resided on the Upper East Side in Manhattan, New York City. Scholz had two sons with Anne Bigelow Rosen and one with Helen Marshall Schelling.

Scholz died on June 3, 1993, in New York City, at age 89.

== Art collecting and Philanthropy ==
Scholz assembled a large collection of Italian drawings, acquiring, in 1939, theatre-related drawings from Michael Mayr, and, in 1944, 1000 Italian drawings, including 49 Bibienas. In 1973 Scholz offered to bequeath his collection to the Pierpont Morgan Library in New York.

Scholz also donated more than 5,000 photographs to the Snite Museum of Art at the University of Notre Dame as well as works to the Metropolitan Museum of Art.

In 2016, the Metropolitan Museum of Art reached a settlement with the family of Michael Berolzheimer, a Jewish art collector who had been persecuted by the Nazis, for a drawing of a stag that Scholz had gifted to the museum.

== Selected works ==
- Scholz, Janos (Spring 1960). "Connoisseurship and the Training of the Eye". College Art Journal. 19 (3): 226–230. doi:10.2307/773956. JSTOR 773956. S2CID 110729074.
- Italian Master Drawings, 1350–1800, From The Janos Scholz Collection, Selected And Described by Janos Scholz
