= Harald Kreutzberg =

Austrian dancer and choreographer (1902–1968)

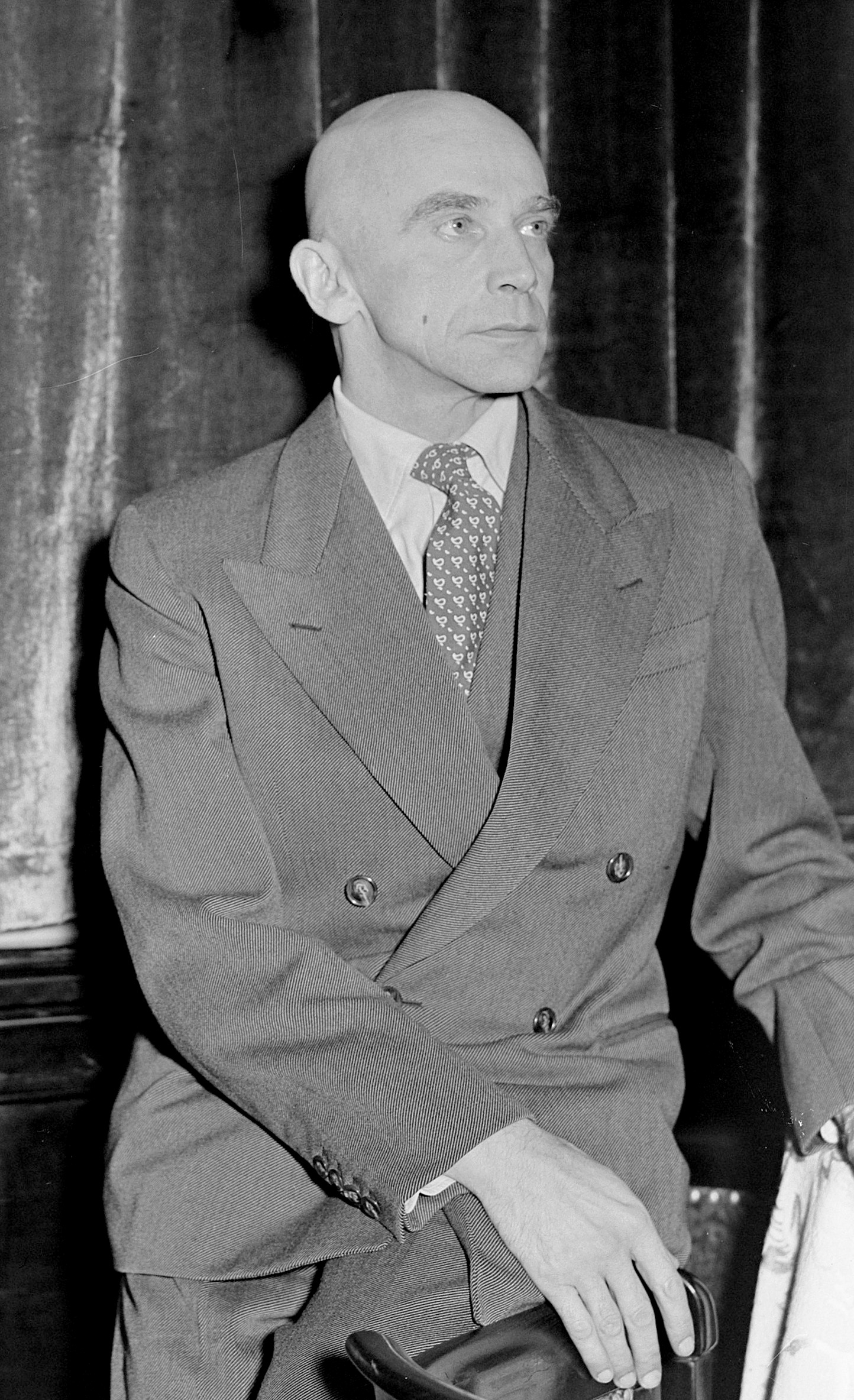
- Kreutzberg in 1950
- Born: December 11, 1902; Liberec, Kingdom of Bohemia, Austria-Hungary
- Died: April 25, 1968 (aged 65); Bern, Switzerland
- Education: Tanzschule Mary Wigman; Dresden Ballet School
- Occupations: Dancer, choreographer
- Years active: 1923–1959
- Partner: Friedrich Wilckens

Harald Kreutzberg (December 11, 1902 – April 25, 1968) was a Austrian dancer and choreographer associated with the Ausdruckstanz movement, a form in which the individual, artistic expression of feelings or emotions is essential. Though largely forgotten by the 21st century, he was the most famous German male dancer of the 20th century.

== Education and early career ==
Kreutzberg was born in Reichenberg, Austria-Hungary (now Liberec in the northernmost part of Bohemia, Czech Republic). He and his family subsequently lived in Breslau, Leipzig and Dresden, Germany. His father and grandfather worked as circus performers and wild animal act entertainers. His mother encouraged his penchant for play-acting and theatricality. At age 6, he entertained at Dresden's operetta house.

He attended the Academy of Applied Art in Dresden; he was reportedly an excellent draftsman. From an early age, Kreutzberg was also interested in costuming and style. During the years of hyperinflation in the Weimer Republic, he assisted with family finances by designing women's clothing for a local department store. In 1920, he performed a "hashish dance" at a student carnival. The piece was so well received, he decided to enroll in dance classes.

Kreutzberg trained at the Dresden Ballet School and studied with the founders of Ausdruckstanz, Mary Wigman and Rudolf von Laban. The Ausdruckstanz phenomenon of the early to mid-20th century flourished in German-speaking Europe. It grew out of the Lebensreform (life reform) movement which promoted physical culture, among other healthy practices, as a means of rejecting the industrialization, materialism and urbanization of modern life.

In 1923, he accepted the invitation of Max Terpis, a former Wigman student, to dance in Hannover where Terpis directed the Municipal Opera Ballet. Dancing with a large ensemble made Kreutzberg somewhat uncomfortable. Sensing this and recognizing his gift for acting, the opera director cast him in small, yet unforgettable, character roles. When Terpis accepted the position of ballet director for the Berlin State Opera, he took Kreutzberg with him.

In 1926, Kreutzberg appeared as Fear in the ballet Die Nächtlichen. The role was meant to depict a sinister, dissonant evocation of demonic forces. Terpis' next production was Don Morte, a version of Edgar Allen Poe's story The Masque of the Red Death. For this piece, Kreutzberg danced the role of an eccentric jester, wearing a gold costume and mask with bald head. The opera costume shop had trouble making a bald wig, so Kreutzberg shaved off all of his blond hair. His appearance made such a strong impression on audiences, he maintained the signature look for the rest of his life. Don Morte also initiated the lifelong collaboration between Kreutzberg and Friedrich Wilckens, Kreutzberg's composer, piano accompanist and life partner.

In 1927, theater director Max Reinhardt cast Kreutzberg in Salzburg productions of Turnadot and Jedermann and, later, as Puck for a New York production of A Midsummer Night's Dream (1929).

== Partnership with Yvonne Georgi ==
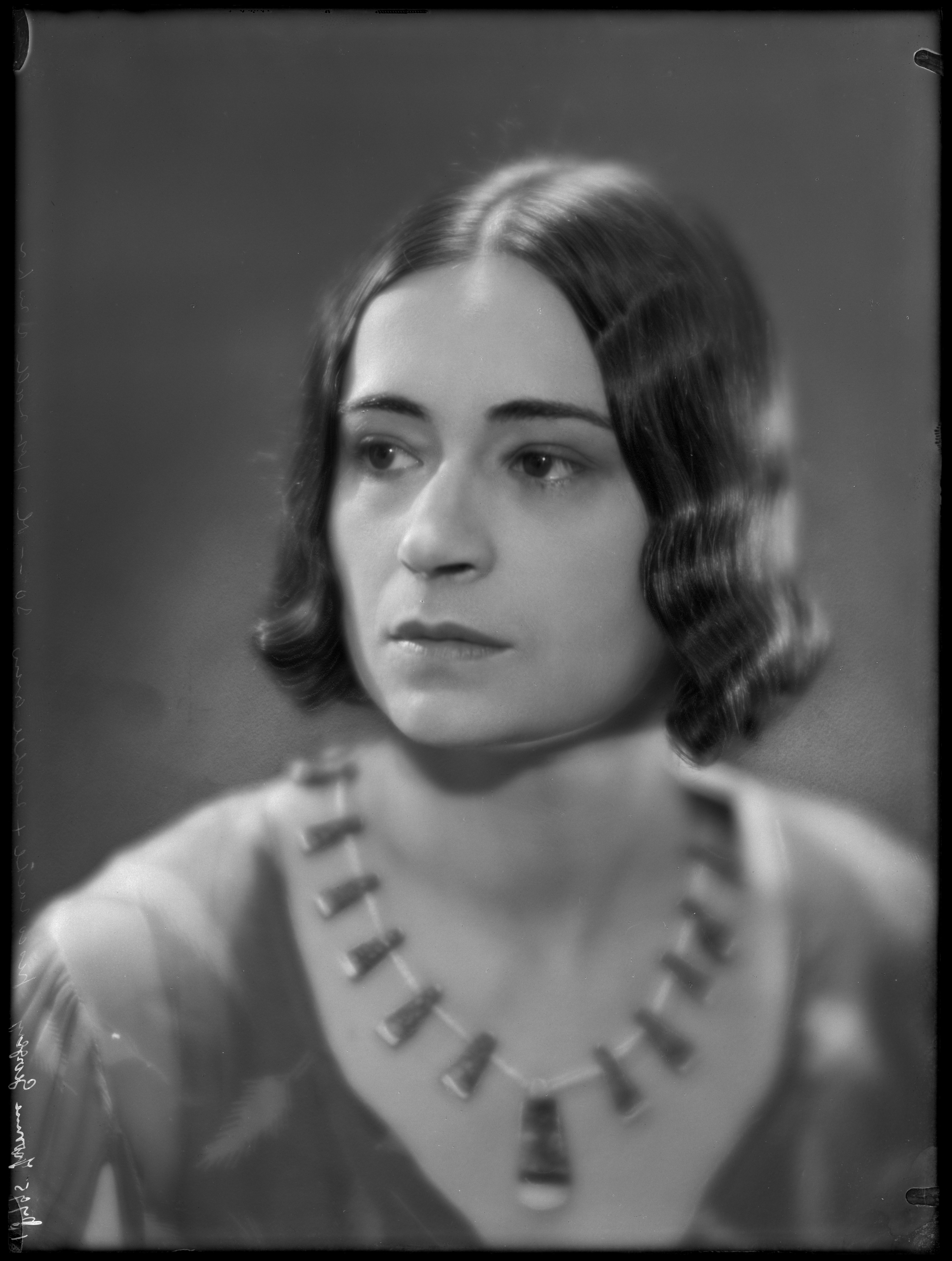
Yvonne Georgi, 1938

When he returned to Hannover in 1928, Kreutzberg collaborated with Wilckens and Yvonne Georgi, a former student of von Laban, on a grotesque pantomime, Robes, Pierre and Co., which presented a man falling murderously in love with a shop window mannequin. It featured dance sequences accompanied by the sound of typewriters, gunshots and Kreutzberg himself singing a falsetto parody of a coloratura aria.

Between 1929 and 1931, Kreutzberg and Georgi made four comprehensive tours of both Europe and the U.S., where they appeared on both coasts and throughout the Midwest, possibly as the most profitable modern dance act in U.S. history. Their enormously popular performances introduced Ausdruckstanz to a widespread audience that delighted in their artistry. Eyewitnesses to the productions were overwhelmed by Kreutzberg's charisma, he "added a theatricality that we did not have at this time," said one. Another recalled "his dramatic quality and terrific intensity…on stage he appeared seven foot tall, and he had a demanding spaciousness utilizing the whole stage."

Georgi and Kreutzberg's programs consisted of solos by both performers interspersed with duets. The dances focused on an austere, streamlined modern aesthetic. Both were muscular, athletic dancers who enjoyed showing off their physical prowess and dexterity; both were prone to melancholy choreographic moods: Georgi to dionysian impulses and Kreutzberg to the grotesque, demonic and macabre. The dances highlighted mirror or echo effects, such as complementary patterns or reciprocities of movement. They never presented man and woman in conflict or created tension through competing configurations of bodily rhythm. The pieces tended toward the elegiac and ceremonial; they seemed to express a virtuosic, synchronized cheerfulness rather than a stirring or triumphant happiness. In Empire of Ecstasy, author Karl Toepfer posits that they exhibited "reluctance to build dramatic tension between each other in relation to a source of conflict—the music, the musician, or the man... and precisely because they pursued such divergent ambitions that they could not long remain a dance couple." In 1931, they toured for the last time.

Their best-known pieces included Fahnentanz, a quintessential mirror dance. The duo was costumed in vaguely Roman garb: centurion-like helmets, tunic/skirts and large capes, which they waved as flags in rapid, swirling motions. Hymnis, with music by Lully, was a somber, ceremonial piece. Pavane, set to music by Ravel, was danced with even greater gravity. Georgi and Kreutzberg wore glowing white costumes as they moved slowly and mournfully through the dark space. Another slow piece, Persiches Lied (music by Satie), was performed in striking Oriental costumes. The dancers met in the space and coiled about each other with matching movements, finally sinking to the floor embracing and covered with a veil.

Kreutzberg and Georgi's 1931 Berlin performance, to Gustav Holst's The Planets, was one of the largest pair concerts ever staged. The piece employed a monumental abstract set consisting of a row of dark, cave-like entrances from which emerged spiraling ramps and towering, slanting walls. Though often separated in space, the couple remained united through complementary movement. In the comedic Potpourri, they wore polka dot costumes and clowned around on stage with pianist, Wilckens, interrupting his efforts to start the music by hovering over him and striking their own dissonant chords. They snatched up sticks and cavorted with them like children, until Wilckens, exasperated, crept away with the music, compelling the dancers to follow him offstage.

In the U.S., critics praised Georgi, but gushed over Kreutzberg, "It is more inspiring to see him merely walk upon the stage with his singularly lithe and detached movement than to witness a whole evening's performance by the average male dancer. Mr. Kreutzberg combines a grave and incisive intelligence with a powerful gift of projection, a clear vision with a lively imagination, and all of these with a splendid physique and a technical facility which is actually lustrous."

Portraits of Kreutzberg and Georgi, together and alone, were printed on cigarette cards distributed as part of Cigarettenfabrik Orami's "Famous Dancers (Series E)" cards. Anna Pavlova, Josephine Baker, Mary Wigman, Rudolf von Laban, Anton Dolin and Ted Shawn were also in this collection.

== Partnership with Ruth Page ==
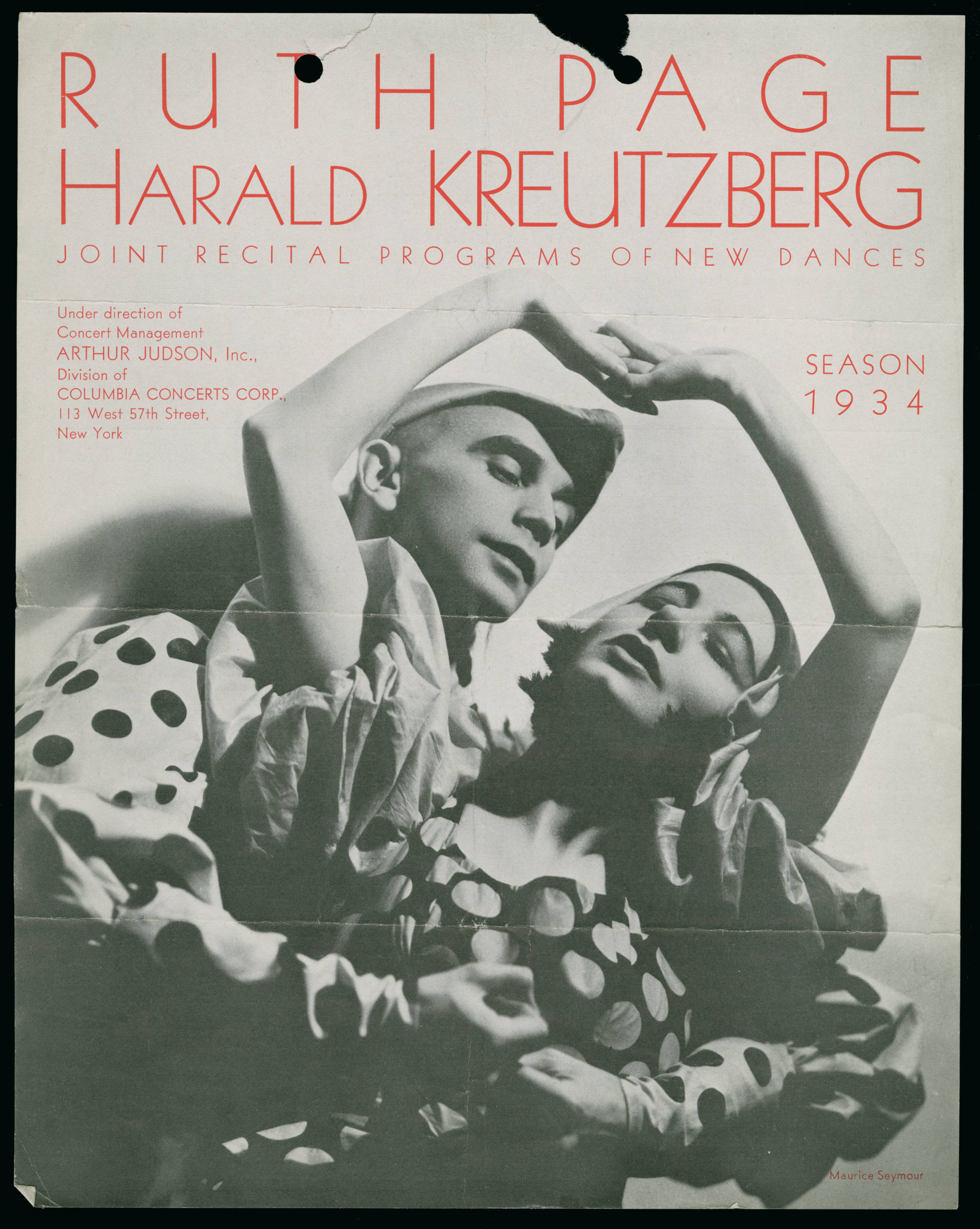
Ruth Page and Harald Kreutzberg, Country Dance, 1934

After touring with Georgi, Kreutzberg was involved in a number of brief dance partnerships: Elisabeth Grube, Tilly Losch and Ilse Meudtner. In 1930, he and Wilckens met Ruth Page, an American ballerina, aboard the Aquitania. The three hit it off immediately, forming a friendship and "artistic ménage a trois" that would last for decades.

In 1933, Page and Kreutzberg launched a "new and rather surprising partnership." Though the pairing of an American ballet dancer with an exponent of German modern dance seemed an unlikely collaboration, but the arrangement provided both artists with a number of advantages. Page, who lived in Chicago outside the dance mecca of New York, acquired a modernist, cosmopolitan aura as well as the musical support of Wilckens. Kreutzberg gained access to new performance venues and an escape from rising fascism and homophobic militancy at home. Both dancers capitalized on their contrasting, yet complimentary, personas.

They performed their first joint concert on February 25, 1933, at the Studebaker Theater in Chicago. Each danced two or three solos, then performed a duet together, a format similar to the one Kreutzberg and Georgi had used. He retained his usual repertoire of solos and refashioned his dances with Georgi to fit Page. Their U.S. tour in 1933 was so successful, they repeated it the following year, then continued on to Japan and China in 1934.

Among their most popular offerings were Country Dance, a folk ballet of sorts, with peasant-style polka dot costumes featuring bonnets and puffed sleeves; Promenade, set to music by Poulenc, a gender fluid number in which elegant, tapering hands and a demure attitude were prevalent; and Bolero, a dance of "fiery, forbidden desire" that played to sold-out houses, won long ovations from the audience and was lauded in the press. Bacchanale, music by Gian Francesco Malipiero, highlighted the experimental, advant garde facet of their collaboration. The austere, Futurist-inspired work was characterized by repeated falls, off-kilter weight distribution and unusual supports. The couple sometimes danced back to back with arms interlaced. Page wore a black dress, Kreutzberg a black shirt and pants. Both wore black elastic bands around their arms and white elastic bands crisscrossing their faces and looping around their necks and heads.

The pair's partnership ultimately dissolved. Kreutzberg may have felt he could best showcase his talents in one-man shows. Page had been appointed ballet director for the Chicago Grand Opera Company for the 1934–35 season. In addition, her partnership with Chicago-based ballet dancer Bentley Stone had become more satisfying. After 1936, as increasing numbers of American artists broke ties with those working in Nazi Germany, it became untenable for Page to continue touring with the German artist. In 1939, the German government revoked Kreutzberg's travel privileges; all scheduled appearances were canceled. Nonetheless, Kreutzberg and Page remained friends, corresponding frequently from 1939 through the postwar years.

Page remembered her years with Kreutzberg as the happiest time in her life. "Dancing with Kreutzberg was like dancing with a disembodied spirit – the spirit of dance itself." Along with Anna Pavlova, she regarded, Kreutzberg as one of the "greatest influences" on her career. Page wrote Kreutzberg's eulogy, published in Dance Magazine in 1968.

== The Dancing Ambassador of National Socialist Germany ==
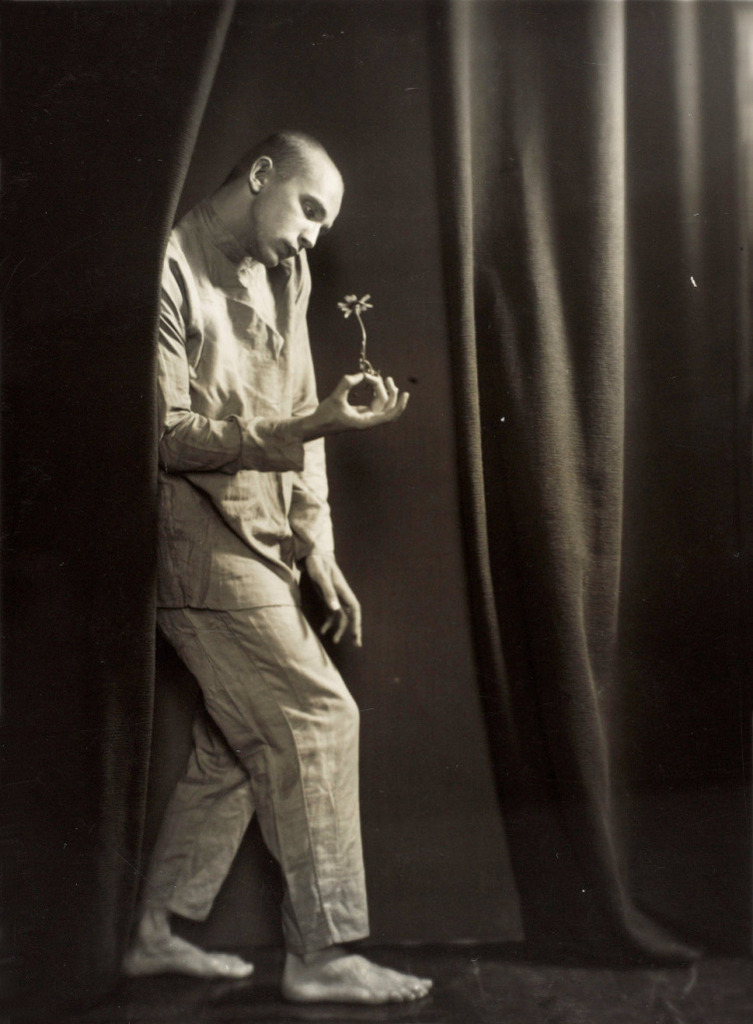
Harald Kreutzberg, The Dance of the Fools, 1927

The rise of National Socialism had a profound effect on Ausdruckstanz. Many dancers remained in Germany and collaborated with the Nazis; others went into exile due to their leftist politics and/or Jewish heritage. Kreutzberg was one of a handful of dancers who maintained a good relationship with the Ministry of Propaganda. He understood what role to play so he could continue dancing. In the 1920s and 1930s, Kreutzberg's productions took on a heightened sense of nationalism. This aspect of his work proved to his advantage since it mirrored the regime's core ideology.

Kreutzberg reached the peak of his career during World War II. In September 1937, he was the featured dancer at German Art Week during the Paris International Exhibition. In 1939, he appeared at the Day of German Art in Munich. His performance schedule followed the advance of Nazi conquests and alliances. In May 1940, The Netherlands fell to the Reich; in July of that year, he gave recitals at the Kurhaus Kurzaal Theater in The Hague. In her book Hitler's Dancers, author Marion Kant refers to Kreutzberg as "the dancing ambassador of National Socialist Germany."

In 1941, the performance pattern of the previous year was repeated. In the summer, Kreutzberg performed at the Kurhaus; in autumn, a tour was organized on his behalf. The 1943 shows were held under the auspices of the German Theater in The Netherlands. From 1942 to 1944 opera, dance and music concerts were organized in different Dutch cities, intended for members of the Wehrmacht. Members of the general public were welcome to attend and critics to write reviews in the press.

News of Kreutzberg's recitals were deployed in different media for propaganda purposes. In The Netherlands, for example, Polygoon Journaal, a weekly newscast shown in Dutch cinemas, included a four-minute clip of Kreutzberg walking on Scheveningen beach and dancing with two local girls (November 22, 1940). Signal, a Wehrmacht-funded Dutch newspaper, published a full-color photo of Kreutzberg as Till Eulenspiegel in the same year.

While many gay male dancers continued careers under the National Socialist government, Kreutzberg was the most notable as his long-term partnership with Wilckens was an open secret. While other gay men were imprisoned and forced to wear pink triangles, Kreutzberg was encouraged to tour throughout Germany and abroad.

=== The Berlin Olympics of 1936 ===
The Reich's Tanzfestspiele (dance festivals) were a prelude to the Olympic Games of 1936. Seeking to establish guidelines for "acceptable dance" and "advance a homogeneous, unified political and aesthetic ideology," Propaganda Minister Josef Goebbels hosted the first Deutsche Tanzfestspiele in 1934. It became an annual event through the Berlin Olympics.

For Nazi Germany, the games were a perfect opportunity to showcase official ideology and demonstrate national strength. The inclusion of dance, as well as other new events, was solicited by the organizers as a means to include areas in which Germany was strong. None of the proposed inclusions were approved, however, the International Olympic Committee in Germany sent invitations to the world's most notable dancers to take part in an international dance competition. Recently appointed German Master of the Studio for Dance, von Laban organized and coordinated the event. Kreutzberg and Wigman were charged with assisting him. All three were to choreograph pieces that conformed to and celebrated Nazi ideology.

After seeing the dress rehearsal of Laban's work, Vom Tauwind und der neuen Freunde (Spring Wind and New Joy), Goebbels rejected it on the grounds it was "a poorly choreographed piece, one that was intellectual, and had nothing whatever to do with Germans." Kreutzberg's dance, set to music by Werner Egk, apparently set the proper tone. The performance took place in the stadium's center under a "temple of light," an effect produced by massed searchlights under Albert Speer's direction. The theme (an allusion to the Spartans' sacrifice at Thermopylae), "The country's greatest gift – to die willingly for it when necessary," was suggested by the Games' organizer Carl Diem.

Kreutzberg's portion of the extravaganza, called Waffentanz (Weapons Dance) or, alternatively, Swerttanz (Sword Dance), was more a theatrical representation than a dance. It began with 60 young men, representing two opposing, sword-wielding phalanxes, storming the stadium like a "wild horde" (New Prussian Newspaper, 1936) and shouting hostile cries. A mock battle ensued, resulting in the fall of one phalanx and a triumphant celebration by the other. The fallen troops remained in the field while the winners departed celebrating their victory. Kreutzberg's solo followed, ending with the dancer's heroic death by sword. Wigman's Totenklage (Death Lament) concluded the Germans' performance. Olympic medals were awarded to both Kreutzberg's and Wigman's troupes.

None of this spectacle appears in Leni Riefenstahl's documentary masterpiece Olympia, because she and her cameramen did not think they had enough light to shoot the scene.

=== Paracelsus ===
In 1943, when Germany seemed certain to lose the war, Kreutzberg appeared as Der Gaulker (The Juggler) Fliegenbein in G. W. Pabst's propaganda film Paracelsus. In the story, Paracelsus (as a stand-in for Hitler) keeps the plague out of Basel by barring entry to the city. During an attempt by a greedy merchant to smuggle in goods, Fliegenbein, attached to the caravan, slips inside the city walls. Already infected, he escapes to a nearby tavern.

In a brief (approximately 65 second), brilliantly choreographed, hypnotic Totentanz, Kreutzberg performs a sequence that "ranks with the best ballet ever put on celluloid." His movements are defined by ambiguity and disorder. He advances, then retreats, slowly hopping, at first, then stiffly marching, eyes glazed, slapping thighs, hips and shoulders. He leads, but does not acknowledge, the mesmerized tavern patrons who follow his display of confused distress and an energy that swings between manic and sickly. The scene evokes historical 16th century "dance epidemics" in which the participants are swept up in a frenzied, mimetic fever.

=== Military service ===
In 1944, Kreutzberg was drafted into the German Army, but Americans soon captured him on the Italian front. He spent two and half months in a prisoner of war camp. In a letter to a friend, he wrote he had a "good time," there, performing scenes from A Midsummer Night's Dream and playing Mephisto in selections from Faust. When he was released, he returned to Germany and resumed his international career.

== Solo career and other postwar projects ==
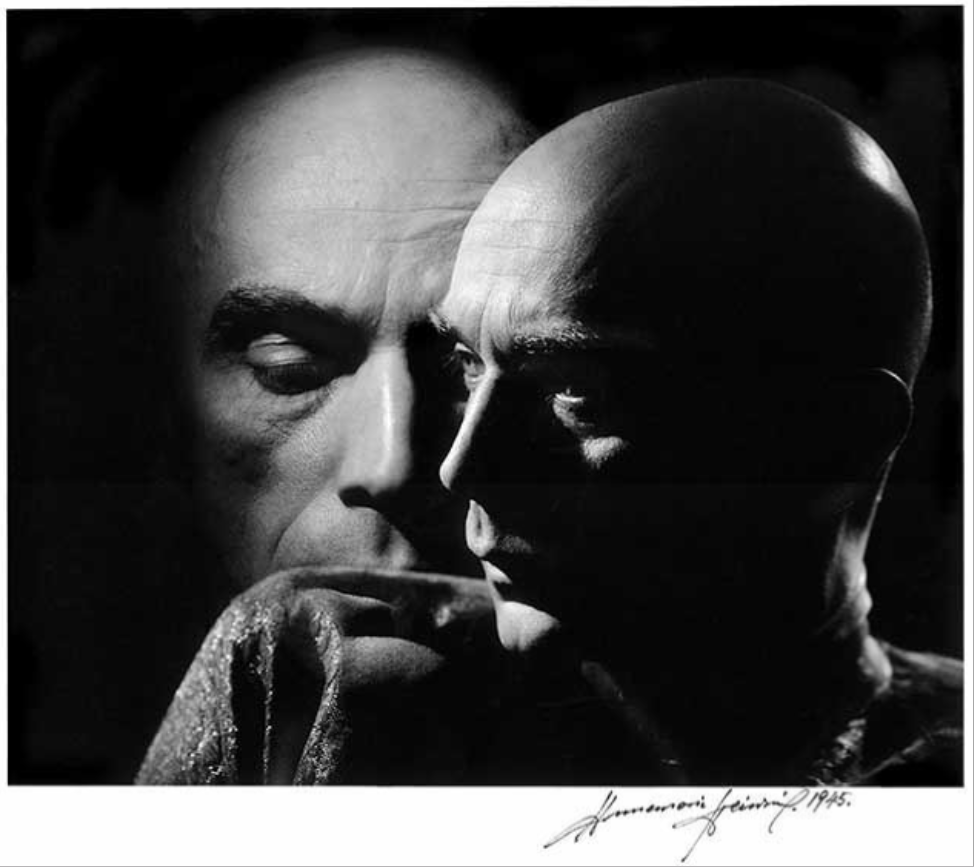
Harald Kreutzberg, 1945

From 1936 forward, Kreutzberg performed primarily as a soloist. Touted by some as the "new Nijinsky", Kreutzberg's style was influenced, in part by ballet, but was dominated by a modern aesthetic characterized by sharp, angular and twisting motions. The solos primarily fell into two categories: charming and humorous character dances that frequently used pantomimic gestures and grotesque masks, and transcendental dances that conveyed emotional states. The works ranged from the tragic allegory of The Angel Lucifer to the comic grotesquerie of The Wedding Bouquet. Even in his most serious performances, Kreutzberg cultivated the image of a jester, a medieval fool or demonic acrobat.

His distinctive choreography combined free dance movements with elements of theater such as mime and pictorial costuming. Similarly to Martha Graham, he created most of his costumes. There are numerous photographs of the inventive garments: the rope noose wrapped around his calf for Hangman's Dance on the Grave of His Victim, the futuristic cage-like headgear worn in the King's Dance, and the string line drawing on his jacket in Three Hungarian Dances.

Kreutzberg performed solos in the U.S. in the early 30s, and again in 1937, 1947, 1948 and 1953. The New York Times dance critic John Martin, who was a fan and follower of Kreutzberg's since his first U.S. appearances, was instrumental in rehabilitating his image after World War II, exonerating him as "a victim of circumstance." In an article for Time, Martin wrote, somewhat disingenuously, of the dancer's wartime record, "[Kreutzberg] danced a few recitals in his native Austria, but mainly he says, tried to keep out of sight: 'I just appeared, then disappeared.'

Postwar, Kreutzberg maintained his status as the doyen of German modern dance. He was the first German artist to go on foreign tours, performing in the U.S., South America and Israel in 1948. Choreographer George Balanchine and writer Lincoln Kirstein invited him to share a program with the New York City Ballet in the late 1940s. He toured through Switzerland, France, Scandinavia. Austria, Hungary and The Netherlands every other year (1950, 1952 and 1954). His last performance in The Netherlands was in 1958. In 1965, at Page's invitation, his last U.S. appearance was with Lyric Opera of Chicago in a production of Carl Orff's Carmina Burana. He danced the role of Death.

He was cast in character roles in the Italian-West German film Labyrinth (1959) as Sir Agamemnon, and in the West German TV movies Annoncentheater – Ein Abendprogramm des deutschen Fernsehens im Jahre (1962) as Artist and Das Kabinett des Professor Enslen (1964) as Professor Enslen.

Kreutzberg made a rare U.S. TV appearance in the 1960s, when he was featured in the dual roles of Drosselmeyer and the Snow King, in a heavily abridged West German-American production of The Nutcracker. It aired on CBS in 1965 and was repeated several times afterward, but was superseded in 1977 by the full-length Baryshnikov version.

In 1955, he established a dance school in Bern, Switzerland. After retiring from the stage in 1959, he choreographed for others and continued to teach until his death on April 25, 1968.

=== Repertory ===
Some of Kreutzberg's best-known solos are listed below, notes on music, costumes and critical reception are included where known.

- Master of Ceremonies, choreographed for a production of Gozzi's Turandot, set to music by Cyril Scott. The costume designed by Kreutzberg consisted of a dark Oriental gown, long scarf and large tassel earrings. His makeup included a large round dot applied to his bald forehead. "He did a thousand things with his hands and the straight blue-lined silver scarf across his shoulders. He made his master of ceremonies everything from a silly slave to ceremony to a tragic power."
- Jester's Dance from Don Morte "an excellent composition in the narrative-dramatic vein, the story of a jester frantically and futilely attempting to escape the mask which he is doomed to wear. The gesture with which he forces his head into the mask is replete with a significance which can be communicated only in terms of movement. It cannot be recorded in words.
- Dance through the Streets, set to music by Isaac Albéniz, is a "graceful bit of mannered art, [that] represents him [as] best in his field. There is fantasy in this. It is pleasant to watch and extremely clever."
- Angel of the Annunciation, a dance that embodies "beauty of design, fascinating flow and sweep of movement combined with an impressive austerity of mood to make a work of art that was satisfying in all respects.
- Three Mad Figures, Kreutzberg impersonates inmates of an insane asylum, conjuring up the Expressionistic aura of the German horror film The Cabinet of Dr. Caligari. American audiences found this piece especially disturbing. From the Oakland Tribune, "studies in insanity with the artificial assistance of flashing lights and screams offstage." Critics in the Midwest did not like it any better, "terrible," proclaimed the Lansing State Journal critic. "The first, an idiot with a flower, the picture painted while minor scales wandered as aimlessly about as the dancer, made one feel as if one were becoming simple oneself and awfulness is piled upon that imbecility until one feels like screaming."
- Hangman's Dance on the Grave of his Victim was described by The Brooklyn Daily Eagle critic as a "sadistic grotesquerie," while the reviewer for The Arizona Daily Star wrote "he stamps and beats with his hands and seems even with the weight of his body to trample down the victim that he has hanged becomes (sic) a study in rage and hate." Photos depicting this dance show Kreutzberg in a costume that features a rope noose wrapped around his lower leg.
- Orpheus Lament for Euridice, music by Wilckens, "one of the finest bits of solo work comes in the latter part...after he (Orpheus) has dismissed the maidens who seek to comfort him. He stands the picture of tragedy and dejection as the maidens drift from the stage...As the last trailing drapery floats from vision, the figure of Kreutzberg becomes galvanized into life and seizing the robe of his dead wife...gives vent to his grief in a series of dance figures which are a veritable delirium of desolation and longing and at the close of which he falls exhausted." This review is from a tour Kreutzberg traveled with a troupe of four female dancers.
- Vagabond's Song was a work of "lighthearted gaiety" set to music by Bedřich Smetana. According to the Times Colonist reviewer, "Vagabond's Song [was] full of joie-de-vivre, and ranging in mood from the wistful to a gay, youthful abandon expressed in great leaps and somersaults."
- Till Eulenspiegel, music by Wilckens, "was clever and amusing, but showed only the softer side of that inimitable German rogue." From program notes on a Canadian tour, "A cape gives him the opportunity of many configurations. Sometimes he becomes a gnome, sometimes a lame old woman, then again a cavalier, and then a bashful girl."
- King's Dance, set to music by Max Reger, "golden swinging spirals surround the powerful movements of a tyrannical figure whose expression is that of sovereign splendor and despotic imperiousness." For this work Kreutzberg wore a red tunic with a wide round gold collar, gold cropped flare-legged trousers, a gold cape attached at the wrists and an elaborate headdress of gold orbits. This dance was often the opening number for North American concerts, "as if to distance the performer from the madman and violent events in Germany."
- Songs of Death was possibly a sketch for the later work The Eternal Circle. The dance consisted of three sections: "Amaroso, where death comes kindly; Majestoso, where death stalks triumphantly; and Furioso, the terrible death of a cripple." Another critic interpreted the piece slightly differently, "death's simulation to sleep was first portrayed, then with the shedding of the funereal black garb to reveal a scarlet tunic, he dramatized death in its more violent form, concluding with a majestic gesture and a haunting, sardonic laugh."
- The Eternal Circle: A Legend of Death, music by Wilckens. In this ballet, "for it can be called by no other name," the sinister, commanding figure of Death makes a visit to earth, leaving behind his black robe as a symbol of his kingdom among the living. "All who fall within that fatal circle die as they have lived,... the drunkard, the vain man, the criminal, the king, the wanton and the invalid," each character "impersonated by Kreutzberg, who makes use of astonishingly impressive masks." "Each figure stands out like those in the medieval woodcuts of the dance of death." After the war, Kreutzberg made a film of The Eternal Circle. It was seldom shown as it was thought to be cursed. After its German premiere, the projectionist died. On its second showing, the theater caught fire.

== Influence and legacy ==
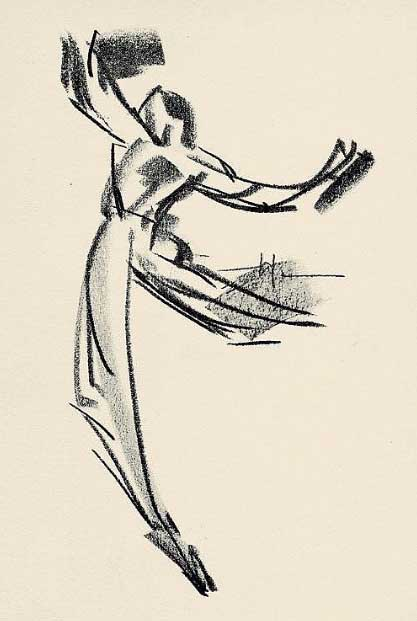
Der Tänzer Harald Kreutzberg, charcoal drawing, Helene von Taussig, 1933

Early in his career, Kreutzberg aligned himself to an expressionistic approach to dance. He remained faithful to that aesthetic until the end of his life. That devotion, however, always accommodated his acute awareness of what pleased audiences. In that regard, he was an important influence in moving modern dance to a global, popular level.

Without doubt, Kreutzberg was a study in contradictions: an artistic revolutionary, while at the same time an ally of the National Socialist regime. Defenders characterize him as apolitical, committed only to his art, though he continued his career uninterrupted under the Nazis and allowed himself to be used as a poster boy for their cultural propaganda. He was one of the most esteemed and highly paid artists in Nazi Germany despite being homosexual and despite the fact he unabashedly presented gender bending modern work. Kreutzberg incorporated feminine movements and costuming in his performances and challenged the stereotypical male roles of princes and mythical gods.

When asked by a reporter to disclose his theory of dance, Kreutzberg responded: "You must understand that we know technique, in fact are grounded in it, but as soon as we have achieved a certain amount of body control and physical gymnastics of movement, we project our minds into the dance and make our bodies express what we feel. Thus, the technique is submerged and made an unconscious undercurrent. Color, costume, music – all are consciously used only so far as they portray the emotion of the dance." To another interviewer, he described his role as that of "storyteller and painter."

As his contribution to Ausdruckstanz swept Europe, his work was impacting U.S. dancers as well. Erick Hawkins and José Limón considered him a major force in the development of the male modern dancer at a time when women "pioneers" were more abundant. He was critical link in the aesthetic lineage that gave rise to American choreographer/composer Alwin Nikolais and choreographer/dance educator Hanya Holm.

In 1933, Helene von Taussig published a book of twenty-four charcoal drawings of Kreutzberg dancing. The minimalist motion studies portray bodily movement rather than physical features as the most important attribute of the dancer's persona. Taussig attempts to capture, in a few broad strokes, an image of muscularity, emotional turbulence and rapturous action: leaping, running and twisting with arms spread, thrusting or propelling.

He was the subject of three documentaries made for German television: the short Große Tänzer (1955), a full-length documentary Harald Kreutzberg – Errinerungen eines Tänzers (1961) and a two-part series Harald Kreutzberg: Part 1, Bilder und Tänze and Part 2, Die Kreis (also 1961).

Kreutzberg's original dances are almost never performed, however at the 2012 American Dance Guild Festival, John Pennington offered a reconstruction of the 1927 solo Dances Before God.

DanceLab Berlin premiered an homage, H.K. – Quintett, in 2015. The choreographers looked at three core questions from Kreutzberg's biography: "How does identity develop between individuality and uniformity? What do the terms 'masculine' and 'feminine' mean, in light of the gender debate? And what is the role of the male dancer today?" Rather than reconstruct Kreutzberg's original pieces, the choreographers worked with five dancers to isolate gestures from Kreutzberg's movement vocabulary and combine them with contemporary movement.
