= Graumann & Stern =

German textile company

Graumann & Stern was a textile company from Berlin-Mitte, founded in 1888 and liquidated in 1938 as a result of Nazi persecution.

== History ==
Graumann & Stern was founded in 1888 by Julius Graumann and the brothers Siegbert Samuel Stern and Albert Abraham Stern to manufacture and sell ladies' coats and dresses. The business was located in Mohrenstraße in Berlin-Mitte, the center of the textile industry at that time. One of the buildings used was the "Haus Stern"" at the address Mohrenstraße 36, which was owned by the Stern brothers.

After World War I, Graumann & Stern expanded in Europe and the USA through international subsidiaries and vertical integration from yarn to coat, increasing sales to 20 million Reichsmarks in 1920. The next generation, Heinz Graumann and In 1931 Wilhelm Ze'ev Stern, Albert Stern's son, took over the management, becoming sole owner in 1932. In 1931, the firm's partner Walther Rabow died of heart failure after anti-Semitic attacks.

== Nazi persecution ==
When the Nazis came to power in Germany on January 30, 1933, Graumann & Stern was persecuted as a Jewish owned business. The Nazi call to boycott Jewish companies on April 1, 1933 hurt the business. Trade within Germany became more difficult or even impossible. Albert Stern fled to the Netherlands. A company closure planned as a result was withdrawn under threat of violence by non-Jewish employees and after violence by the SA. Wilhelm Ze'ev Stern's family fled to Palestine as early as 1933, Wilhelm himself fled there in 1935. In 1936 Wilhelm Ze'ev Stern renounced the company and left it to co-partners.

With the Decree on the Use of Jewish Property ("Verordnung über den Einsatz des jüdischen Vermögens") of December 3, 1938, Jewish-owned commercial enterprises and real estate had to be sold. The liquidation of Graumann & Stern took place in 1938. Albert Stern died in a Nazi camp in January 1945 in Laufen (Salzach).

== See also ==
- Johanna Margarethe Stern
- The Holocaust
- Aryanization
