= Helene von Taussig =

Austrian artist

- Born: 10 May 1879; Vienna, Austria
- Died: 21 April 1942 (aged 62); Izbica Ghetto, Poland
- Known for: Painting

Helene von Taussig (1879-1942) was an Austrian painter.

== Biography ==
von Taussig was born on 10 May 1879 in Vienna, Austria. Born into a prominent Jewish family, she was the fifth of 12 children. In 1910 she traveled with fellow artist Emma Schlangenhausen to Oschwand, Switzerland where they studied painting with Cuno Amiet. From 1911 through 1914 von Taussig studied at the Académie Ranson in Paris. During World War I she served in the Red Cross on the Isonzo front. After the war she settled in the Anif area of Salzburg with Emma Schlangenhausen and Hilde Exner.

In 1923 von Taussig converted to Catholicism. In 1934 she moved into a studio designed by Otto Prossinger.

Because of her Jewish ancestry von Taussig was deported to the Izbica Ghetto in Poland in 1942 where she died in on 21 April 1942.

== Legacy ==
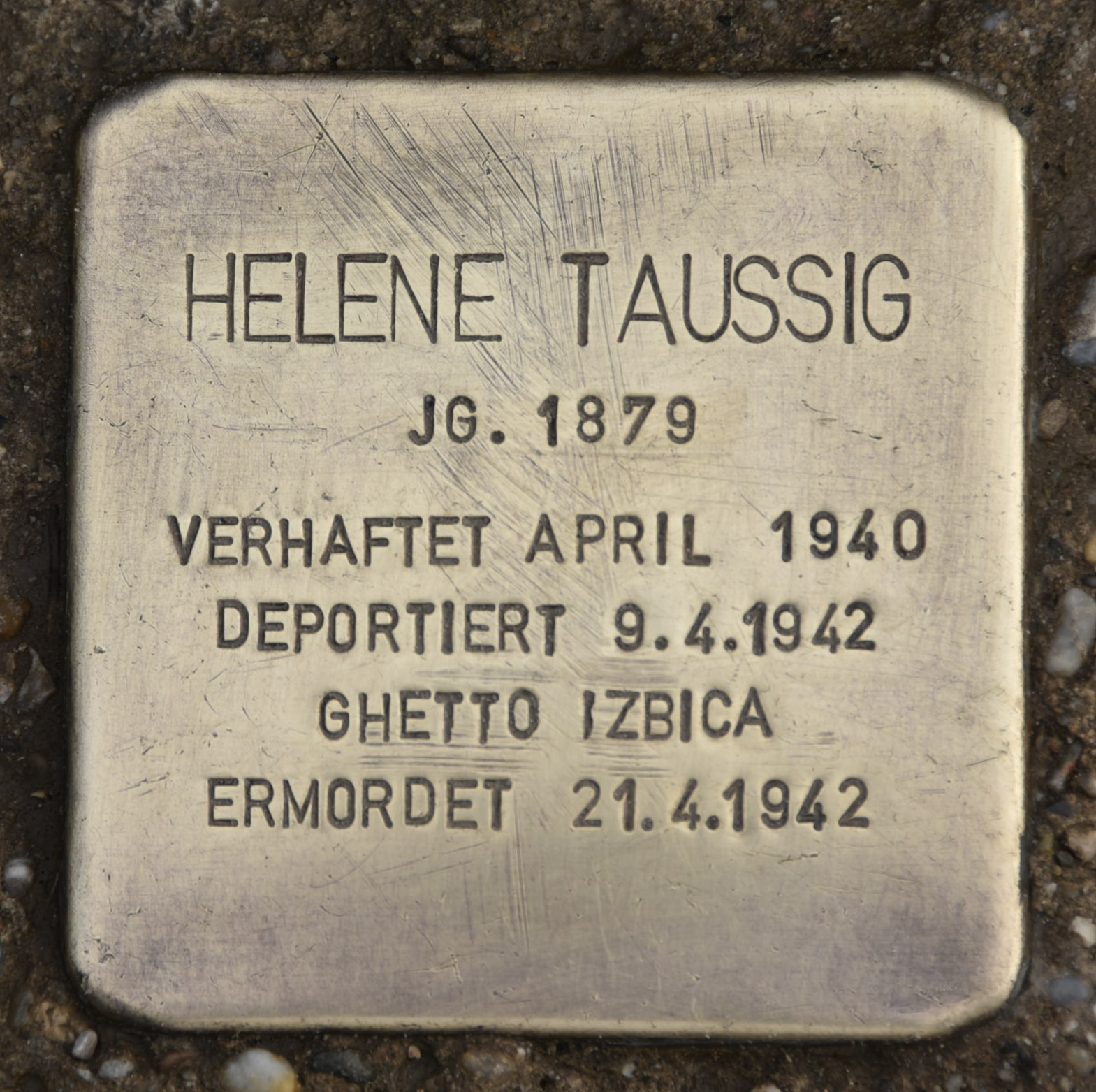
Stolperstein for Helene Taussig

In 2012 many of her paintings were returned to her heirs by the Salzburg Museum as part of the Federal Act on the Restitution of Artworks from Austrian Federal Museums and Collections. The heirs subsequently sold eleven of the nineteen paintings back to the Salzburg Museum.

von Taussig is memorialized by a stolperstein in Kirchenplatz, Anif, which was installed in 2014.

Her work was included in the 2019 exhibition City Of Women: Female artists in Vienna from 1900 to 1938 at the Österreichische Galerie Belvedere.

== Gallery ==
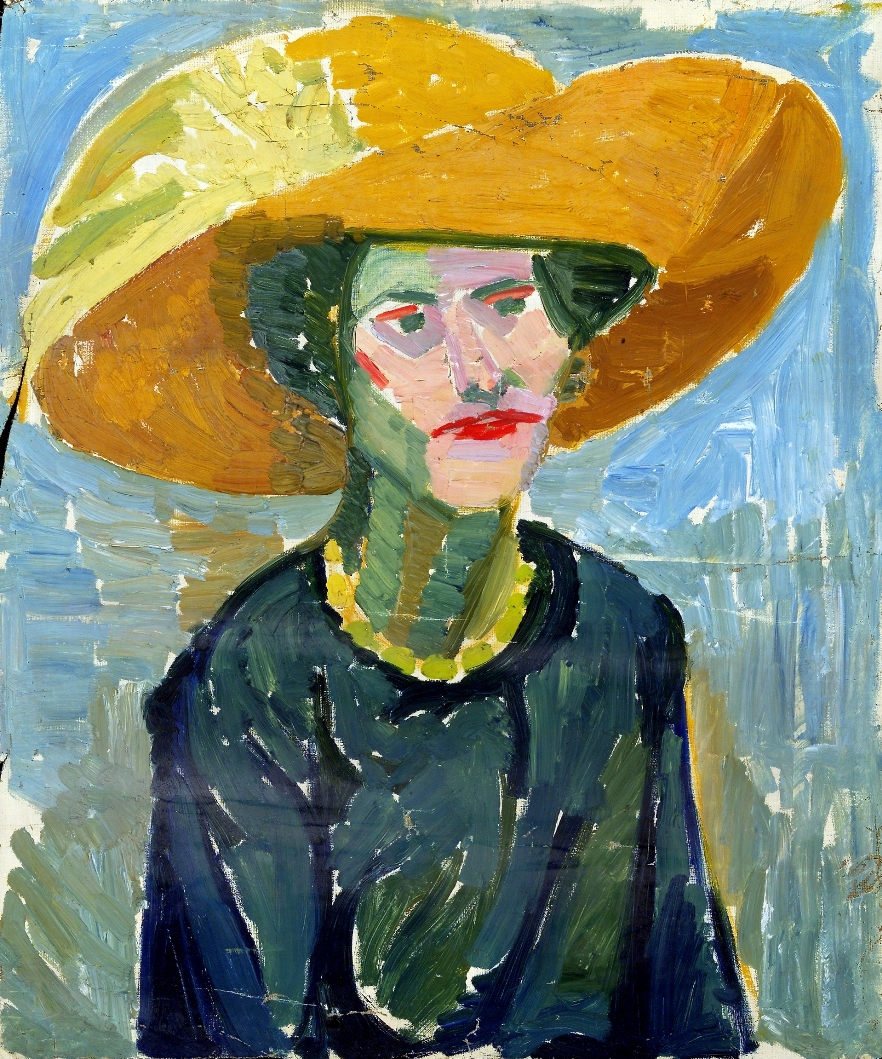
Dame mit gelbem Hut, 1920

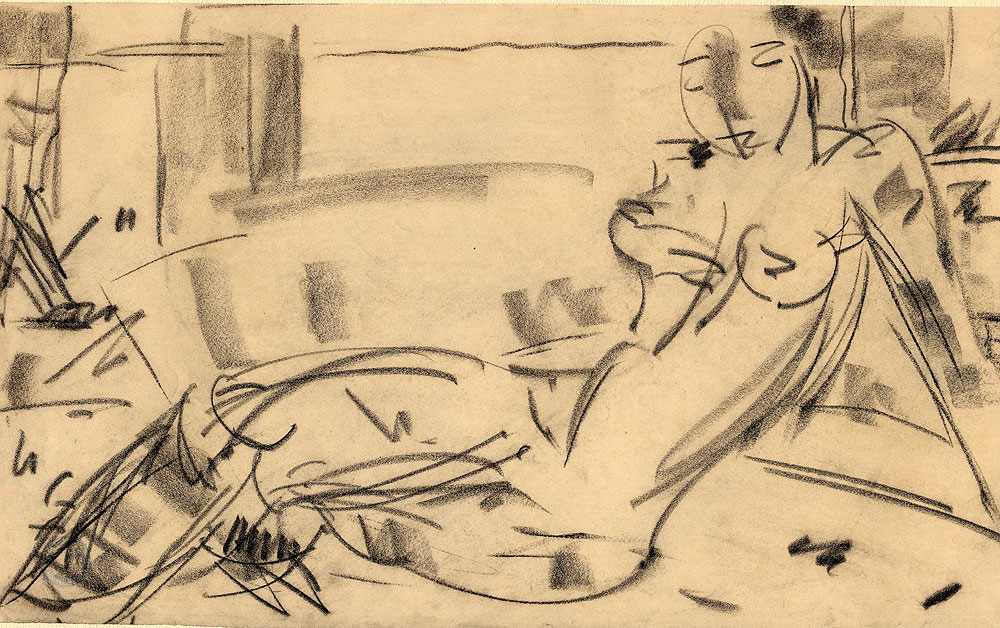
Aktstudie, 1932

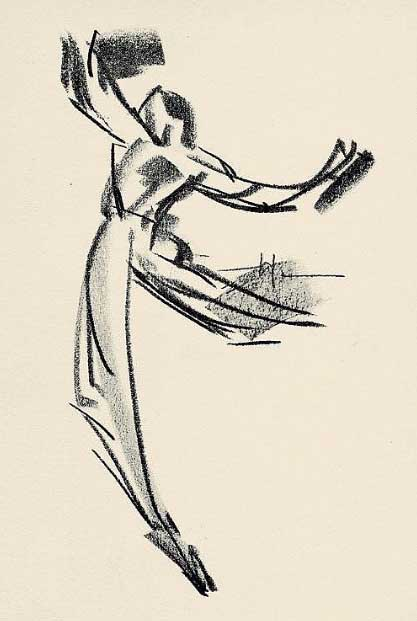
Der Tänzer Harald Kreutzberg, 1933
