= Hugo Helbing =

German art dealer (1863–1938)

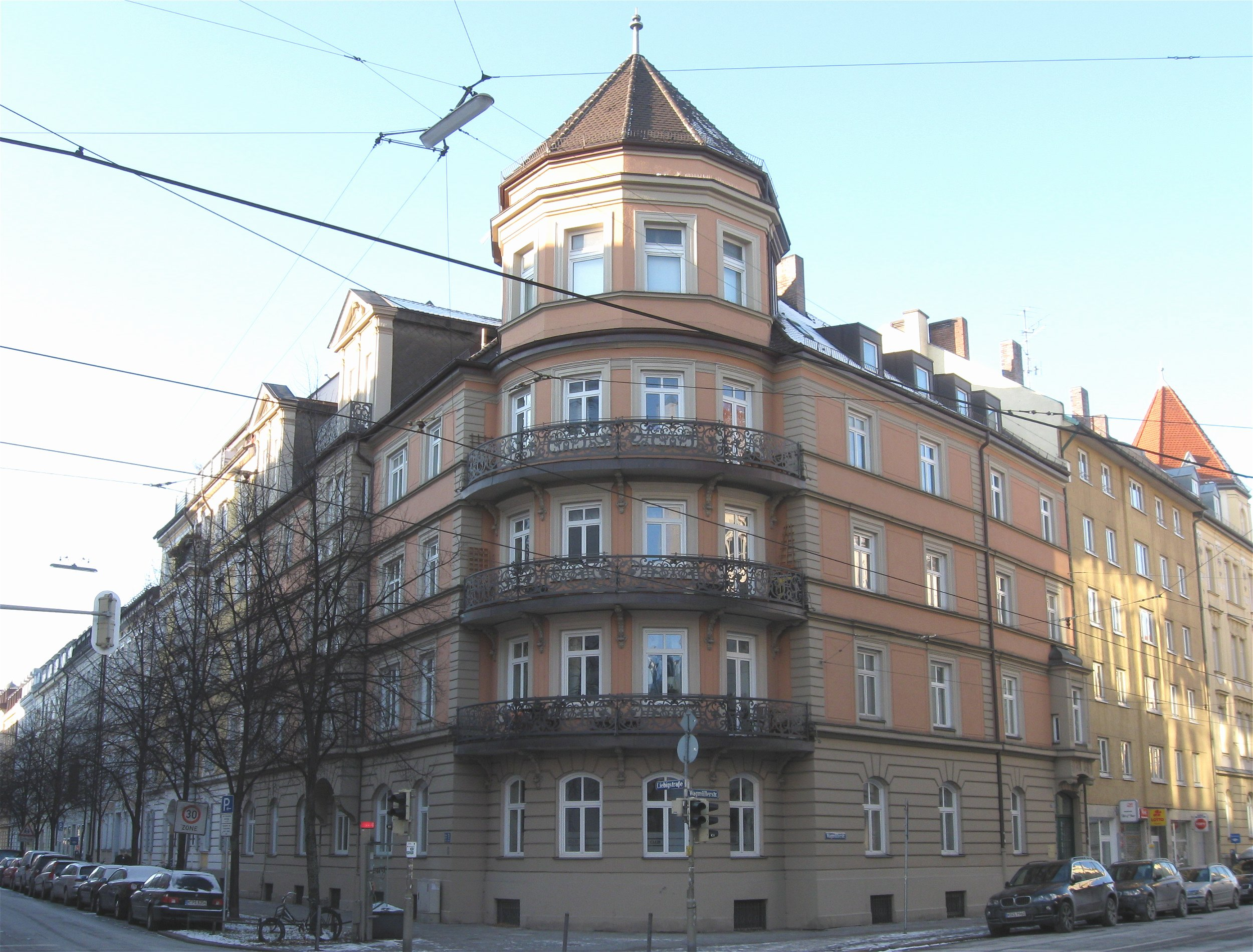
The premises of the Helbing auction house were located in the building at Liebigstr. 21/corner of Wagmüllerstr. 15 in Munich.

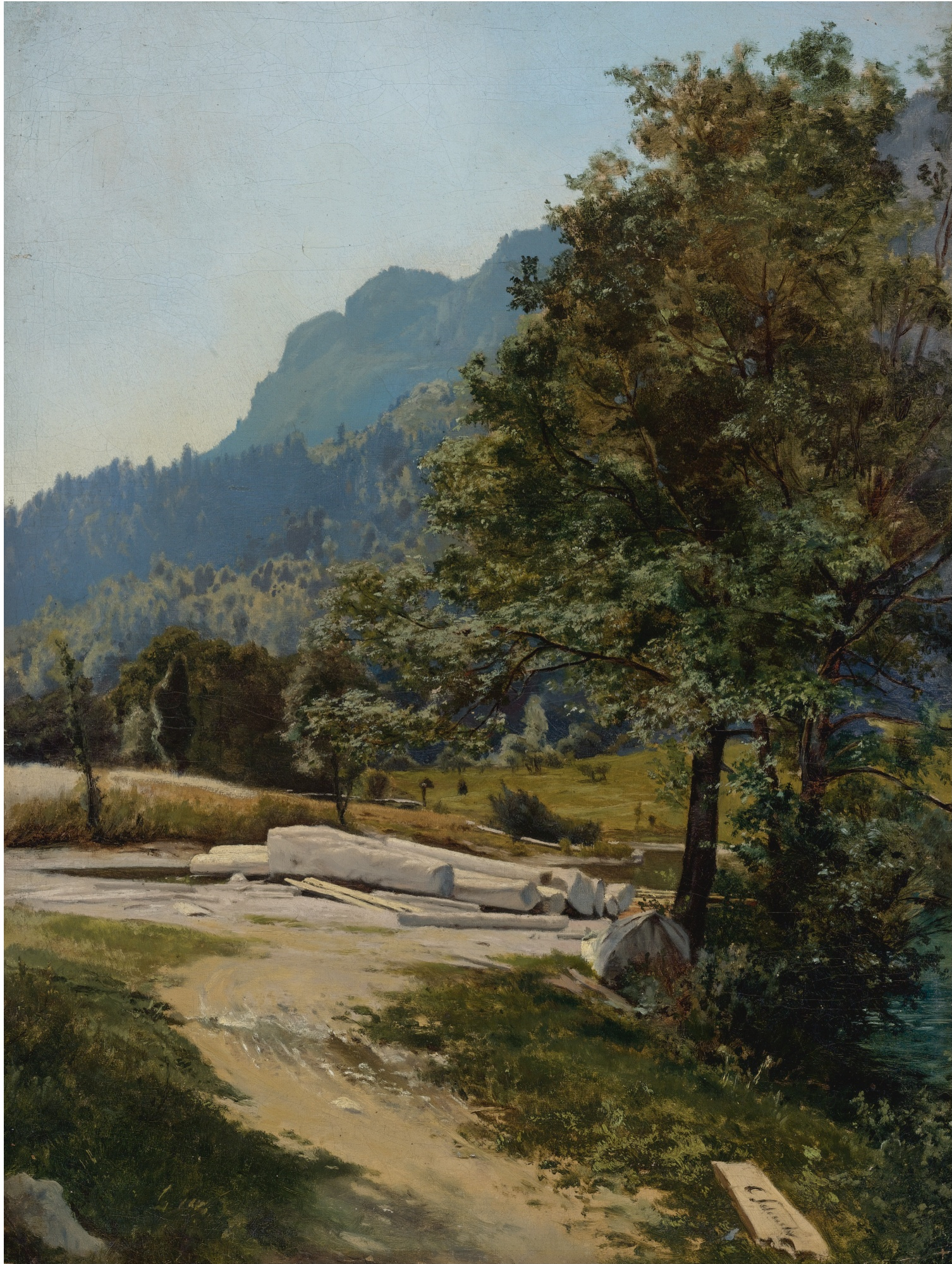
One of the paintings sold by the auction house Hugo Helbing: Carl Schuch's Wald mit gefällten Bäumen from 1868.

Hugo Helbing (23 April 1863 – 30 November 1938) was a German art dealer and auctioneer.

== The Helbing art shop ==
Born in Munich, Helbing was a son of Sigmund Helbing, who ran an antique dealer in Munich from the middle of the 19th century. His sons also became active in this field: Helbing had a respected coin shop in Munich, his brother Ludwig opened an antique shop in Nuremberg, and Hugo Helbing founded the Kunsthandlung Hugo Helbing in 1885.

From 1906, Helbing ran the company together with other co-owners, including his son Fritz from his first marriage. The internationally renowned house had branches in Berlin and Frankfurt, and Helbing was appointed to the rank of Kommerzienrat. Helbing's auctions, which lasted several days and were held in collaboration with Paul Cassirer from 1916 until the 1920s, were considered social events and were "a piece of cultural history of our century". Between 1930 and 1935, the Helbing auction house published 123 auction catalogues, making it one of the largest auction houses of the time. The antiquarian Max Ziegert portrayed Helbing in his memoirs:

The man is a figure in Munich's art life and knows it. When I had business dealings with him, I always felt defenceless. He was so above me that I simply had to say yes when he wanted something. He raped you with the greatest kindness and urbanity. […]

Max Ziegert (2009). Schattenrisse deutscher Antiquare – Persönliche Erinnerungen aus den Jahren 1870 bis 1915. Elbingen: Verband Deutscher Antiquare. ISBN 978-3-9812223-3-3.

== Family ==
Helbing married Sophie, née Liebermann, in his first marriage and had two sons with her, Rudolf and Friedrich David (Fritz). Rudolf died as an infant; his son Fritz, born in Munich on 16 December 1888, was married three times but remained childless. In 1926, Helbing married his second wife Lydia Ludwina, née Vorndran, born on 10 April 1884 in Würzburg.

From 1908, Helbing acted as guardian to his nephew Fritz Nathan, son of his sister Irene, who had become an orphan at the age of 13.

== During the National Socialist era ==
In March 1933, shortly after the seizure of power by the Nazis, the auction Gemälde alter und neuer Meister was held in Düsseldorf Breidenbacher Hof which had been organised by Helbing together with the art dealer Alfred Flechtheim and the Galerie Paffrath, was broken off by the Sturmabteilung. The gallery owner was forced into this demolition because of Helbing's and Flechtheim's Jewish origins, and the works Degenerate Art were confiscated. The Bundesamt für zentrale Dienste und offene Vermögensfragen writes: "Such disturbances against art dealers were common after the National Socialists came to power. Actions like the one at the Paffrath Gallery were carried out by the Kampfbund für deutsche Kultur under the leadership of Alfred Rosenberg". Flechtheim himself was not present when the auction was cancelled; he had "literally collapsed" when he heard about it. He left Germany in October 1933 and died in London four years later.

In 1935, Helbing's membership in the Reichskammer der bildenden Künste was revoked because he was Jewish, and with it his auction licence expired. Helbing had tried to prove the great economic importance of his company by listing his sales with the Bavarian State Ministry, Department for Trade, Industry and Commerce, but the Reich Chamber refused to grant him a further auction licence "in view of auction regulations". From then on he had to have his business run by an "arian" employee; the other Jewish co-owners had to leave.

On 9 November 1938, the Helbing art shop was closed and Max Heiss, an employee of the Reich Chamber of Fine Arts, was appointed as "trustee". Helbing himself was beaten up on the same day in his residence in front of his wife during the riots of the Kristallnacht. He was taken by wheelbarrow to the Israelitisches Kranken- und Schwesternheim, but any medical help came too late. On 30 November 1938, the 75-year-old succumbed to his severe injuries at home. His son Fritz and his third wife Doris, née Goldstein, were deported in 1942 or 1943 to the extermination camp Auschwitz and murdered.

== After Helbing's Death ==
From 1936 onwards, the art market in Munich was dominated by NSDAP member Adolf Weinmüller, who as chairman of the Bundes deutscher Kunst- und Antiquitätenhändler was partly responsible for Helbing no longer being able to work in the art trade and as an auctioneer. He had previously been actively involved in the Gesetz über das Versteigerungsgewerbe (Law on the Auction Trade), which aimed to systematically eliminate Jewish art dealers and antiquarians.

In 1956, Helbing's widow Lydia stated for the Wiedergutmachung that the "trustee" Heiss had also had art objects that had been in the family's possession transferred from the private flat to the art shop. At the reading of the will, Heiss had declared that the company would be closed down within a few hours on behalf of the NSDAP if Lydia Helbing and her son Fritz accepted the inheritance. Heiss "arisierte" the Helbing company through sale to Jakob Scheidwimmer, NSDAP member since 1929, for 30,000 ℛ︁ℳ︁. In 1939 and 1940, he sold Helbing's properties in Munich.

However, Scheidwimmer was not granted an auction licence and continued to run the business as a pure art gallery. He sold art objects, also from Helbing's private property, to Martin Bormann, among others, such as the painting Straße am Golf von Neapel by Oswald Achenbach for the Residenzschloss Posen intended as "Führer Residence". In 1957, Helbing's heirs were awarded damages of DM 5,000 for the paintings taken from their private property on the basis of a settlement.

Helbing's nephew Fritz Nathan emigrated to Switzerland with his family in 1936 and build a new existence there as an art dealer and advisor to important art collectors Emil Buehrle and Oskar Reinhart .

The discovery of 187 auction catalogues from Helbing's auction house became public in 2021. The catalogues, which cover the years 1896 to 1937 and are annotated, are of importance among others for the provenance research because of the significance of the Kunsthandlung Hugo Helbing.
