= Emma Schlangenhausen =

Austrian artist

- Born: 9 March 1882; Tyrol, Austria
- Died: 11 March 1947 (aged 65); Salzburg, Austria
- Known for: painting, graphic art

Emma Schlangenhausen (1882-1947) was an Austrian painter and a graphic artist.

== Biography ==
Schlangenhausen was born on 9 March 1882 in Tyrol, Austria. She studied at the School of Graphic and Experimental Art and the University of Applied Arts in Vienna. Her teachers included Kolo Moser and Alfred Roller. She exhibited at the 1904 St. Louis World's Fair where she won a silver medal. She was a member of Wiener Frauenkunst (Viennese Women's Art) and the Association of Visual Artists of Austria and Der Wassermann.

Schlangenhausen died on 11 March 1947 in Salzburg, Austria.

Her work was included in the 2019 exhibition City Of Women: Female artists in Vienna from 1900 to 1938 at the Österreichische Galerie Belvedere.

== Gallery ==
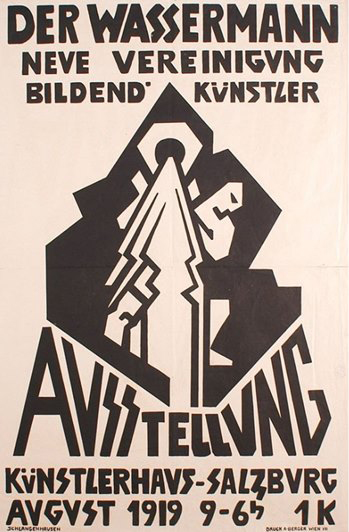
Der Wassermann, 1919

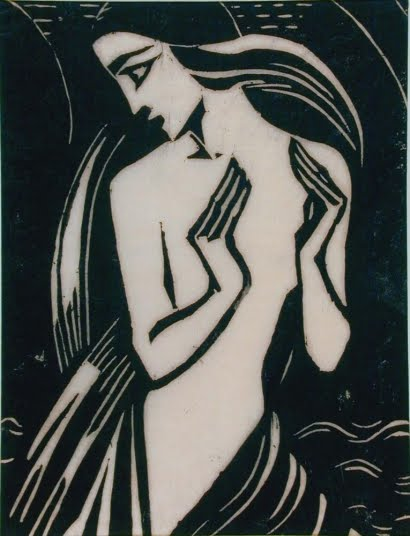
Die Frau
