= Adolf Weinmüller =

German art dealer

Adolf Weinmüller (born 5 May 1886 in Faistenhaar; died 25 March 1958) was a German art dealer and Nazi party member who trafficked in looted art and Aryanized the S. Kende auction house as well as Helbing. The catalogs of his auctions were published in 2014 for provenance research and restitution to victims.

== Early life ==
Weinmüller trained in forestry at the State Forest Service in Bad Reichenhall in 1905. During the First World War he fought for Germany on the Western Front, after which he returned to forestry. In 1921 he went into business as an art dealer on Max-Joseph-Strasse in Munich. Little is known about its business operations in the 1920s. In 1931 he joined the Nazi party. (NSDAP membership number 626.358).

== Nazi art dealer ==
After the Nazis came to power in 1933, and the persecution of Jewish dealers, Weinmüller's career took off. He had himself commissioned to enforce anti-semitic race laws in the Nazi Association of the German Art and Antiques Trade" and to eliminate other art dealer associations. Weinmüller became chairman of the "Association of German Art and Antique Dealers", under the control of the Reich Chamber of Fine Arts. In 1935 art dealers became direct members of the Reich Chamber and thus Weinmüller's association. He helped shape anti-Jewish legislation and in 1936, he took over the auction house of the Jewish art dealer Hugo Helbing in Munich, and in 1938 the company of the Jewish art dealer Kende in Vienna. In 1934, the anti-Jewish law on the auctions was drafted with Weinmüller's assistance, helping to drive Jewish competitors out of the art business.

=== Aryanizations ===
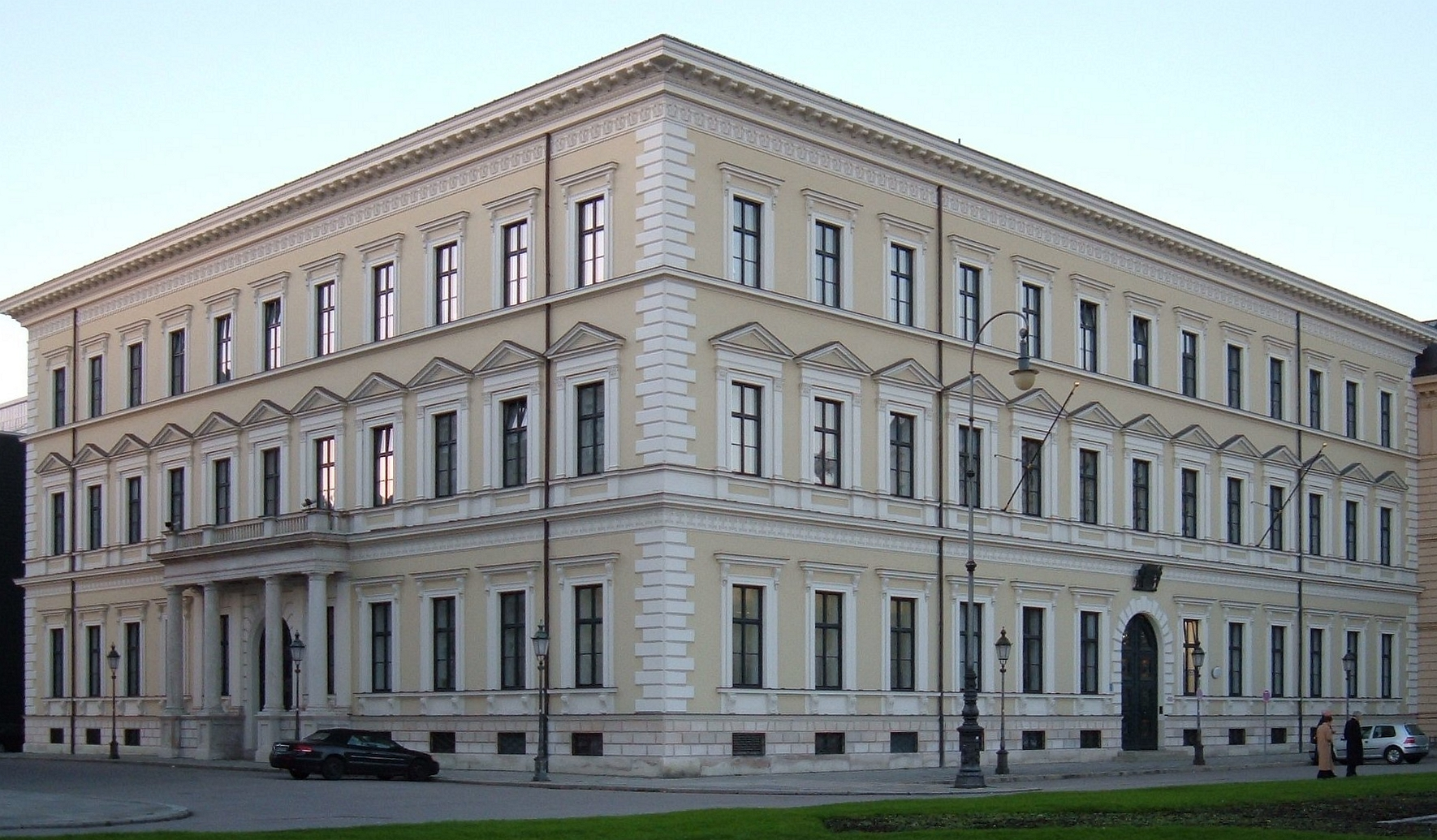
Leuchtenberg-Palais (1967 rebuilt)

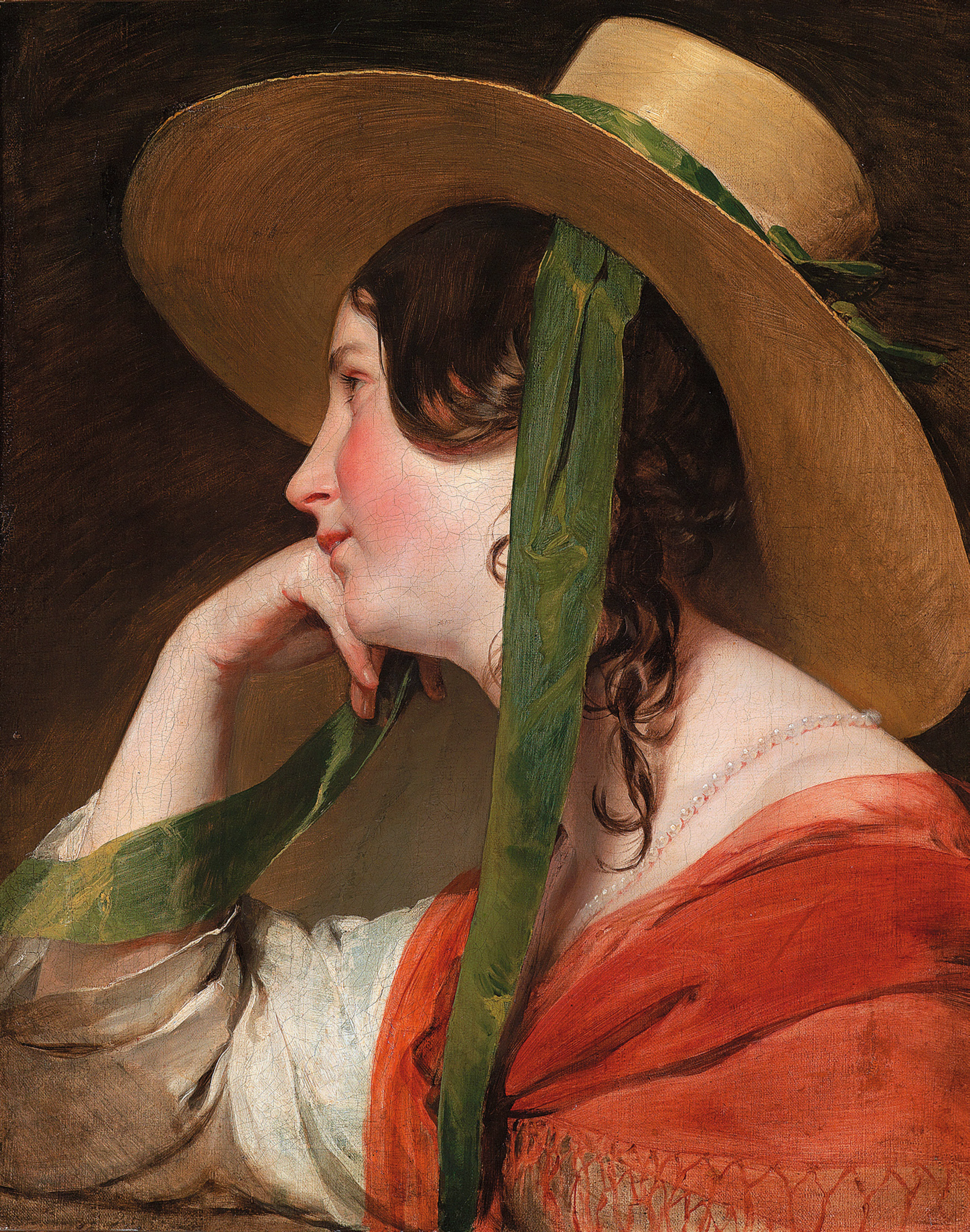
Friedrich von Amerling: Mädchen mit Strohhut (1835). from the collection of Ernst Gotthilf forced auction in 1939 at Weinmüller in Vienna

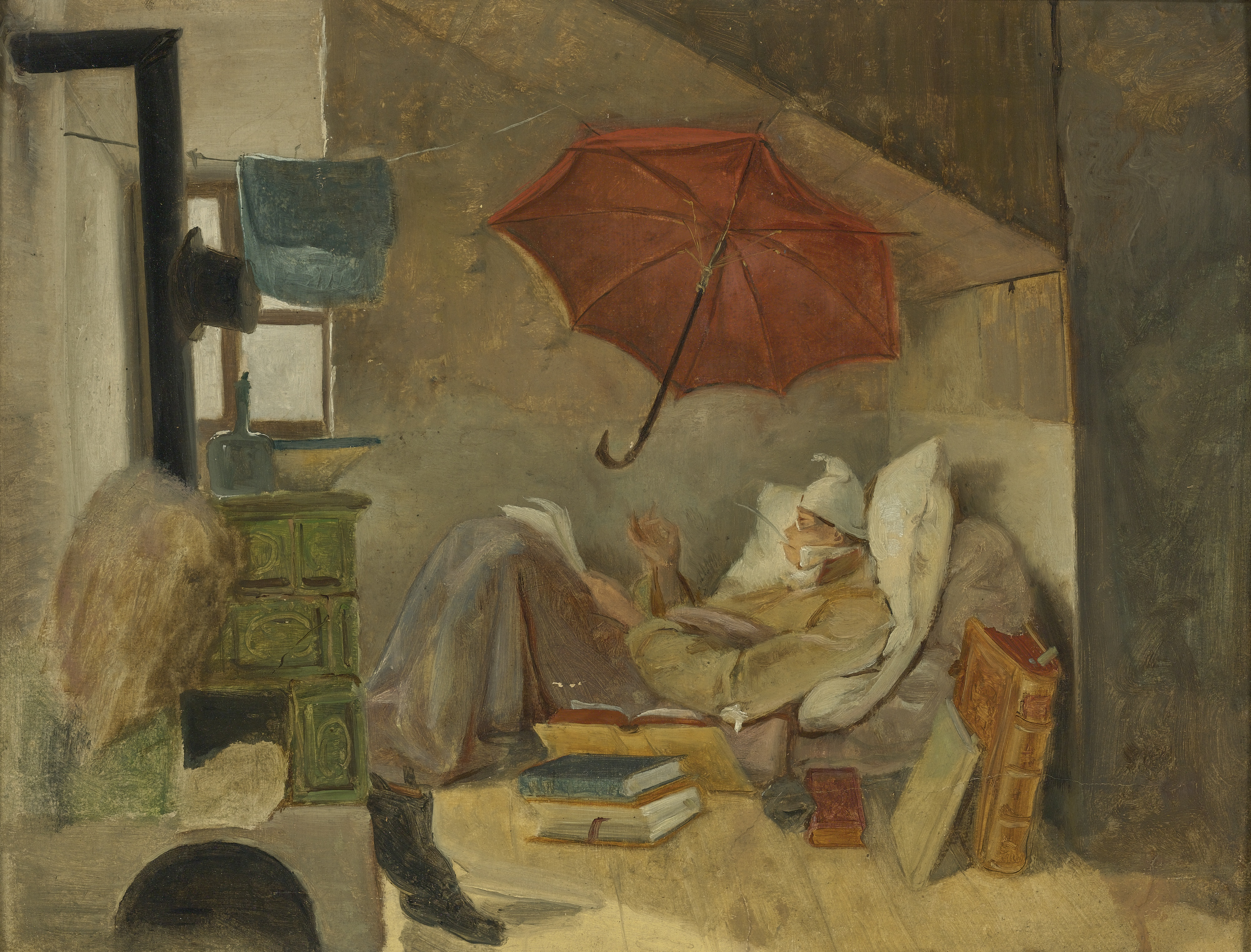
Carl Spitzweg: Der arme Poet (Entwurf). From the collection of Michael Berolzheimer sold in a forced acution in 1938 at the Weinmüller auction house Munich

In the lead-up to the Holocaust, the Nazis forced Jews out of economic life and took over their businesses in a process called Aryanization. Thanks to the Nazi anti-semitic race laws, Adolf Weinmüller was able to take control of Jewish art dealerships and auctions house like those of Hugo Helbing and Samuel Kende. By late 1938 - after Kristallnacht - "all 628 Jewish-run art and antiquity dealers had been put out of business and their inventories plundered".

Weinmüller profited enormously from his role in the Aryanization of the art sector. According to Meike Hopp, "he had a great deal of influence on the elimination of Jewish art dealers because, as a state-approved appraiser, he refused to give Jewish businesses licenses to hold auctions". As a result Weinmüller knew in advance which Jewish dealers would be forced to sell off all their collections next.

In addition to his dual business as an art dealer and auctioneer, Weinmüller also held exhibitions on his premises with painters popular in the Nazi movement, including: to Lothar Bechstein and Hans Flüggen (1875–1942). The Munich art auction house Adolf Weinmüller, now unrivaled in Munich, opened in 1936 in converted, rented rooms of the Leuchtenberg Palace with a memorial exhibition on August Seidel (1820–1904). After the annexation of Austria in 1938, Weinmüller founded a second auction house in Vienna and Aryanized the business of the Jewish art dealer family Kende.

=== Nazi-looted art ===
With Hans Posse, Ernst Heinrich Zimmermann (1886–1971) and Johannes Graf von Waldburg, Weinmüller belonged to a commission that in June 1941 inspected cultural assets at the Gestapo headquarters in Prague that had been stolen from Jews and politically unpopular Czechs by the Nazis. The less significant part of it was auctioned at the Dorotheum in Vienna and at Weinmüller in Munich.

His clientele included Martin Bormann, who was responsible for furnishing the Obersalzberg, the Brown House and the German Castle in Posen, and dealers like the gallery owner Maria Almas-Dietrich, who supplied art for Hitler's special museum planned in Linz. During the Second World War, Weinmüller had to leave the Leuchtenberg Palais, which had been destroyed in the war, in May 1943 and stored some of his goods in requisitioned rooms with the painter Adolf Schinnerer in Haimhausen. There were also works of art in the monasteries of Maria Eck Monastery, Dietramszell Monastery, Ettal Monastery, the Marquartstein rectory, Fischbachau and private apartments. He held the last auction in Vienna in December 1944.

=== Postwar ===
The OSS Art Looting Intelligence Unit investigated Weinmüller in 1946 and considered him to be a Red Flag Name for Nazi looting. Despite evidence that Weinmüller was deeply implicated in Nazi looting of the Jews, he escaped prosecution, and was classified as only a "follower" (Mitlaufer) in the Munich denazification process in June 1948. The Austrian preliminary investigation against him was discontinued in 1955.

The American Monuments Men Edgar Breitenbach and Stefan P. Munsing from the Central Collecting Point (CCP) requested further investigation of Weinmüller, but this was ignored and the Weinmüller auction house was reauthorized to function on 16 February 1949, initially in the rooms of the Hotel Bayerischer Hof. Weinmüller was able to reclaim most of the artworks that the Central Collecting Point had seized from him, which he claimed to have acquired legally. In the following years and until his death in 1958, Weinmüller held 35 auctions in his auction house in the Almeida-Palais on Brienner Straße.

In July 1958, Rudolf Neumeister took over the Weinmüller auction house, keeping the name unchanged until 1978 when he changed it to Neumeister Münchener Kunstauktionshaus. The owner of the Neumeister company since 2008, Katrin Stoll, made the still existing business documents available for provenance research and restitution efforts by Meike Hopp.

== Provenance research of Nazi-looted art ==
In 2013, all Munich auction catalogs from the years 1936 to 1945 were found in the rooms, including the auctioneer's hand copies and documents for the tax authorities, plus eleven catalogs from the Vienna branch. The catalogs contain information about consignors and, in some cases, also about buyers. Weinmüller had always maintained that these documents had been destroyed by the effects of the war which turned out to be false. The documents were digitized in 2014 and are available for provenance research and, if necessary, restitution.

=== Plundered Jewish collectors ===
So much art looted from Jews by the Nazis passed through the Adolf Weinmüller auction house that an index of consignor names was published in order to assist families searching for their lost works of art Examples of Jewish collectors whose plundered possessions passed through Weinmüller included Siegfried Laemmle whose case was featured in the 2014 documentary Under the Hammer of the Nazis. In 2007, Friedrich von Amerling's Girl with a Straw Hat, which until then was hanging in the Belvedere in Vienna. A painting by Waldmüller followed in 2012, on loan from the Oldenburg State Museum. Both pictures belonged to Ernst Gotthilf, the Jewish architect who fled Vienna from the Nazis and died in exile in 1950.

== Publications ==
- Auction catalogs from 1936 to 1958.

== Literature ==
- Meike Hopp: Kunsthandel im Nationalsozialismus: Adolf Weinmüller in München und Wien. Böhlau, Köln/Weimar/Wien 2012, also Dissertation at the Ludwig-Maximilians-Universität München, Munich 2011, ISBN 978-3-412-20807-3.
- Gabriele Anderl: Der Kunsthandel in Österreich während der NS-Zeit und seine Rolle im nationalsozialistischen Kunstraub. Studien Verlag, Innsbruck 2012, ISBN 978-3-7065-5223-3.

== See also ==
- Aryanization
- The Holocaust
- List of claims for restitution for Nazi-looted art
- Führermuseum
