= Samuel Kende =

Austrian art dealer

Samuel Kende (8 April 1858 – 13 September 1928) was an Austrian art dealer, antiquarian and auctioneer whose auction house, S. Kende, in Vienna, was "Aryanized" after the Nazi annexation of Austria.

== Life and family ==
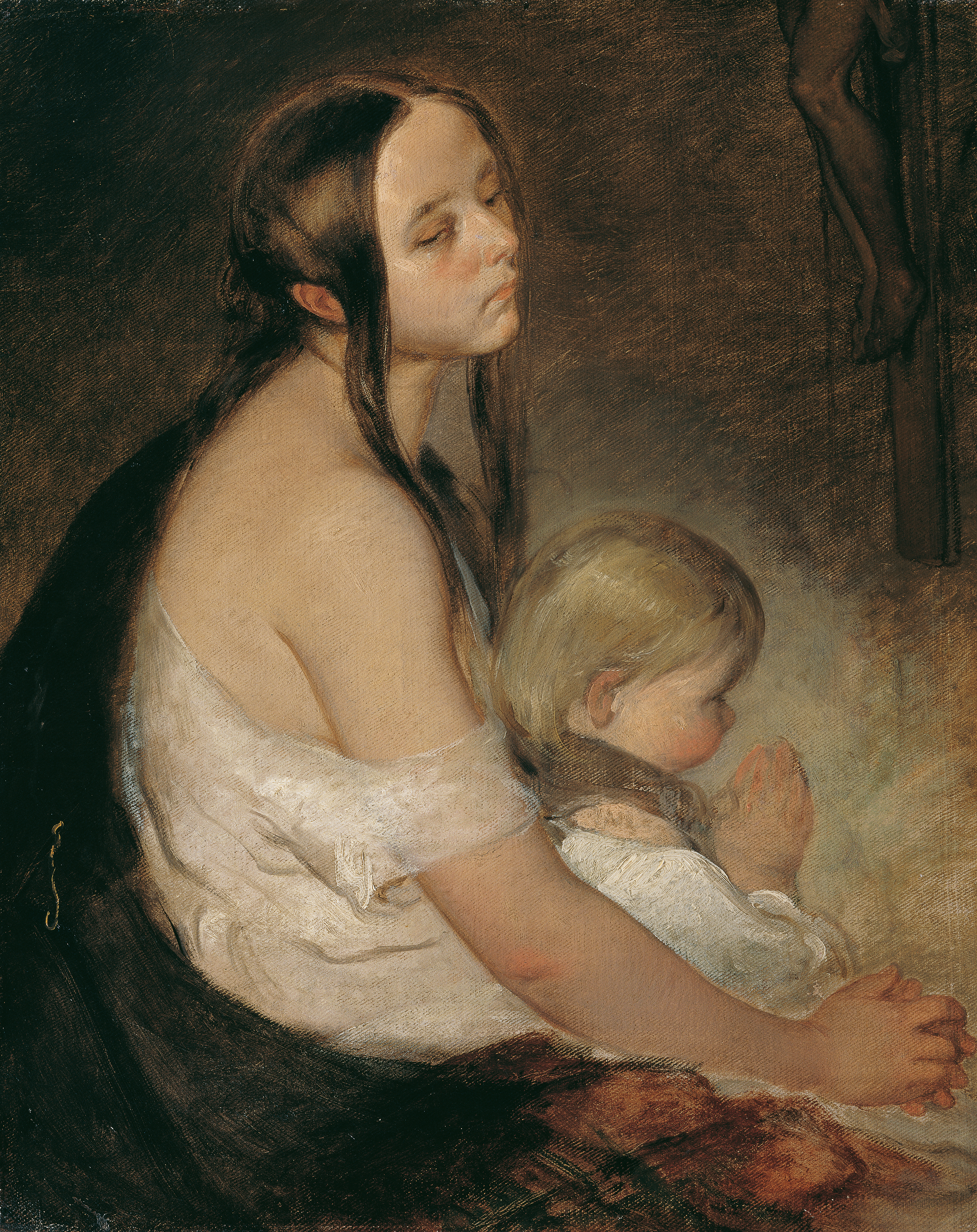
Peter Fendi's Mother with Child under the Crucifix, 1899, in the Samuel Kende collection

Samuel Kende was born in Klausenburg, Siebenbürgen, Austro-Hungarian Empire (now Cluj-Napoca, Romania) in 1858. In 1888, he founded an antiquarian bookshop with his brother, Albert, selling theological, archaeological and art literary works. From 1895 onward, auctions took place. Albert Kende started his own business as an auctioneer in the 1890s. The Art antiquarian and auction house "S. Kende" was registered in 1918 as a sole proprietorship based in Vienna I, Weihburggasse 18, in the commercial register of the Commercial Court of Vienna, later as an open trading company (OHG). The Kendes dealt with copperplate engravings, lithographs, oil paintings and watercolors. From 1920 the company's headquarters were at Rotenturmstrasse 14, where it expanded its range to include furniture, carpets, jewelry, gold and silver goods. He carried out numerous art deals, including so-called house auctions, in which entire apartment inventories were auctioned on the spot, just as they were organized by the Dorotheum, and counted well-known domestic and foreign collectors among his customers. Samuel Kende died in 1928. His widow, Melanie (née Horner; born 1872/1873 – died 1956) and their son, Herbert Alexander Kende (1908-1977), continued to run the auction house. 31 house auctions are documented for the years 1930 to 1938. In 1930, they organized a commemorative exhibition for Rudolf von Alt, for which collectors made loans available. In 1937, the company had sales of around 487,000 schillings.

Samuel Kende’s second brother was Josef Kende, a notable figure in Vienna’s publishing and antiquarian book trade. His two sisters were Helene Hlavacek and Irma Zeller von Zellhain, who worked as a music teacher.

Among the siblings, only Irma survived the Holocaust, apparently because of her marriage to the non-Jewish Guido Zeller von Zellhain, although he himself faced persecution by the National Socialists for political reasons. He was arrested on 13 February 1943, and legal proceedings against him for “preparation for high treason” and “benefiting the enemy” were temporarily suspended in 1944 because he was deemed unfit to stand trial. Guido Zeller von Zellhain died on 4 January 1945 in the General Hospital in Vienna.

=== Nazi Anschluss, Aryanisation, Flight ===
After Austria was "annexed" to the German Reich in 1938, Jews were prohibited from owning or operating businesses. Kende's auction house in Kärntnerstraße and artwork were Aryanized i.e., transferred to non-Jews. Initially placed under the temporary administration of Ferdinand Josef Nagler, the S. Kende company was then managed on a "temporary basis" by Blasius Fornach, owner of an antiques and painting shop in Vienna, and then by Arthur Raimund Morghen, according to the files, as the "political leader of the NSDAP". From mid-May 1938, a Munich art dealer, Adolf Weinmüller, sought the "Aryanization" of the S. Kende company at the Reichstatthalterei (Austrian provincial government), gaining control on 19 November 1938 "despite protests from Viennese auction houses and art dealers". Adolph Weinmüller & Co. Wiener Kunstversteigerungshaus (Adolph Weinmüller & Co. Vienna Art Auction House) took the place of S. Kende running the auction house until 1944.

Melanie Kende and her son Herbert were able to emigrate to the United States, in 1939 and 1938, respectively, both later becoming United States citizens. In May 1947, Melanie and Herbert Kende submitted an application for restitution of the company to the restitution commission of the Regional Court for Civil Law Matters in Vienna. This was granted in 1948. The auction house was renamed to “S. Kende” was renamed and lasted until the 1950s. However, neither Kende ever returned to Vienna. Mother and son founded a successful art dealership in New York ("Kende Galleries"), which they continued to run there after the war. Herbert married Helga Weiselthier, sister to Vally Wieselthier, a celebrated artist and ceramicist, former head of ceramics at the Wiener Werkstatte, in 1947 and had one son, Christopher Burgess, born in 1948.

=== Death of Albert Kende ===
Albert Kende died in the Theresienstadt concentration camp on 3 December 1942. At the request of his surviving sister, Irma Zeller von Zellhain, he was declared deceased by order of the regional court for civil law matters in Vienna on 10 November 1946. His brother, antiquarian book dealer and publisher Josef Kende (born 6 June 1868), was deported to Dachau concentration camp on 1 April 1938 and later was sent to Buchenwald.

=== The Weinmüller catalogs ===
Lostart.de published the annotated catalogues of the Nazi-era auction house Adolf Weinmüller were released online on 27 May 2014. These included 33 auctions that took place in Munich between 1936 and 1943, as well as 11 of the 18 auctions that took place in Vienna between 1938 and 1944.

== Literature ==
- Meike Hopp: Die Arisierung des Auktionshauses S. Kende in Wien 1938. In: dies: Kunsthandel im Nationalsozialismus: Adolf Weinmüller in München und Wien. Böhlau Verlag, Köln/ Weimar/ Wien 2012, ISBN 978-3-412-20807-3, S. 225–239
- Euer armer, unglücklicher, vollständig gebrochener alter Albert Kende
