= Lines in My Face =

Studio album by Chronic Future
- Released: June 22, 2004
- Recorded: 2003–2004
- Length: 50:16
- Label: Interscope
- Producer: Sean Beavan

Chronic Future chronology
Lines in My Face EP (2004)	Lines in My Face (2004)	This and of That (2006)

Singles from Lines in My Face
- 1. "Time and Time Again" Released: 2004

Professional ratings
Review scores
Source	Rating
AllMusic	3.5/5 stars
Sputnikmusic	3.5/5

Lines in My Face is the third commercially released album by American rap rock band Chronic Future. It features the hit single "Time and Time Again", and has a range of themes in the tracks involving the Golden Era of the radio, New York City, and friendships. The album put the band into the mainstream for a short period, before the band left Interscope Records in 2006 and began an independent career.

A music video for the song "Time and Time Again" was made, featuring animated characters including the band itself. The music video was mostly animated and directed by Ian Inaba of the Guerrilla News Network, who also animated the video for Mosh by Eminem. The music video tells the story of a rebellious young boy (seeming to be Mike Busse, as he performs lead vocals when the band plays in the video) who is sent off to war by his parents, but returns as a war hero. It is currently one of two music videos the band has made, the other being the video for "Insomniac" from the band's self-titled debut album.

The album featured more metal-orientated guitar styles, as well as Brandon Lee taking on the role as one of the lead vocalists.

== Reception ==
The album received average to positive ratings and the song "Time and Time Again" was praised, becoming an instant favorite. The song "Shellshocked" is also very popular among fans. The album peaked at #18 on the Billboard Heatseekers chart.

Rolling Stone (p. 188) - 3.5 stars out of 5 - "[M]ost songs navigate the well-worn territory of pop punk and rap rock without bowing to the conventions of either."

== Media appearances ==
- "Time and Time Again" was used on the soundtrack of the hit video games Burnout 3 and MVP Baseball 2004, performed at G4's Gphoria in 2004, used for the 2004 WWE Diva Search, and was used in episode 20 of the first season of One Tree Hill.
- "Wicked Games" was featured on the CSI: Miami episode Crime Wave.
- "Static on the Radio" was used on the soundtrack of the video game Gretzky NHL 2005.
- "Apology for Non-Symmetry" was used on the soundtrack of the driving simulator Gran Turismo 4.

== Track listing ==
All lyrics are written by Mike Busse; all music is composed by Chronic Future.

No.	Title	Length
1.	"Time and Time Again"	3:32
2.	"World Keeps Spinning (A Chronic Future)"	3:23
3.	"Shellshocked"	4:35
4.	"Stop Pretending"	3:39
5.	"New York, NY"	3:06
6.	"Thank You"	4:36
7.	"Memories in F-Minor"	3:33
8.	"Wicked Games"	5:11
9.	"Static on the Radio"	3:35
10.	"Eyes Wide Open"	2:54
11.	"Apology for Non-Symmetry"	3:51
12.	"Say Goodbye"	8:21

- Note: In digital music stores, "Say Goodbye" is renamed to "Say Goodbye/Final Ambience."

== Personnel ==
- Mike Busse – lead vocals, backing vocals
- Ben Collins – lead vocals, lead guitar, turntables, programming, backing vocals
- Mike Loy – rhythm guitar
- Brandon Lee – lead vocals, bass guitar, backing vocals
- Barry Collins – drums, percussion
