= The Four Elements (disambiguation) =

The Four Elements are the four classical elements, which were proposed to explain the nature and complexity of all matter in terms of simpler substances.

The Four Elements or 4 Elements may also refer to:

- The Four Elements (Arcimboldo), a series of four paintings created by Giuseppe Arcimboldo in 1566
- The Four Elements (sculpture), a mobile sculpture created by Alexander Calder in 1961
- The Four Elements of Architecture, an 1851 book by Gottfried Semper
- The four elements of hip hop, attributes used to define hip hop music
- 4 Elements (album), a 2000 album by the band Chronic Future
- 4Elements (TV Series) , a 2026 Thailand TV Series

== See also ==
- The four humors in ancient medicine
