= Kansas International Film Festival =

Film festival in Overland Park, Kansas

- Location: 3707 W 95th St, Overland Park, KS 66206
- Founded: 2001; 25 years ago
- Language: International
- Website: http://www.kansasfilm.com

The Kansas International Film Festival (KIFF) is a non-profit Kansas-based organization that promotes independent and vintage cinema through film expos. The festival is held every fall.

In 2001, KIFF received a 501(c)(3) designation under the corporation name of Photoplay, Inc. Photoplay's board of directors consists of filmmakers, film distributors, educators, theatre owners, and film historians. The Fine Arts Theatre Group provides the venues for KIFF viewing.

KIFF serves the movie idealist by focusing on documentary, narrative, and animated independent films. The festival closes with the presentation of the following awards: Jury Award for Best Narrative, the Jury Award for Best Documentary, the Audience Award for Best Narrative, the Audience Award for Best Documentary, and the Independent Vision Award. The winners are selected by panels of local filmmakers, film educators, and critics. KIFF attracts local, regional, and national works, along with visiting actors, actresses, and filmmakers. The festival also educates the public about cultural and economic issues affecting independent and vintage cinema.

In 2010, MovieMaker magazine named KIFF as "one of the top 25 film festivals worth their entry fee."

== Past winners ==
=== 2019 ===
- Jury Award Best Narrative-Postal, Tyler Falbo
- Jury Award Best Documentary-Right To Harm, Annie Speicher, Matt Wechsler
- Audience Award Best Narrative-Silo
- Audience Award Best Animation-Two Balloons, Mark C. Smith

=== 2013 ===
- Jury Award Best Narrative - K Effect: Stalin's Editor, Valenti Figueres
- Jury Award Best Documentary - Small Thing, Jessica Vale
- Audience Award Best Narrative - Construction, Malcolm Goodwin
- Audience Award Best Documentary - Blood Brother, Steve Hooker

=== 2012 ===
- Jury Award Best Narrative - The Ghastly Love of Johnny X, Paul Bunnell
- Jury Award Best Documentary - Dave, Eric Geadelmann

=== 2011 ===
- Audience Award Best Narrative - eMANcipation, Philipp Müller-Dorn
- Audience Award Best Documentary - Lesson Plan, David H. Jeffery, Philip Neel

=== 2010 ===
- Jury Award Best Narrative - Soul at Peace, Vladimír Balko
- Jury Award Best Documentary - Holy Wars, Stephen Marshall

=== 2009 ===
- Jury Award Best Narrative - 16 to Life, Becky Smith
- Jury Award Best Documentary - Vincent: A Life in Color, Jennifer Burns

=== 2008 ===
- Jury Award Best Narrative - N/A
- Jury Award Best Documentary - The Flyboys, Rocco DeVilliers

=== 2007 ===
- Jury Award Best Narrative - Midnight Clear, Dallas Jenkins
- Jury Award Best Documentary - The Edge of Eden: Living with Grizzlies, Jeff Turner, Sue Turner

=== 2006 ===
- Jury Award Best Narrative - Mojave Phone Booth, John Putch
- Jury Award Best Documentary - Hand of God, Joe Cultrera
