= American Blackout =

2006 film by Ian Inaba

- Directed by: Ian Inaba
- Produced by: Jean-Philippe Boucicaut; Anastasia King; Stephen Marshall
- Starring: Cynthia McKinney
- Edited by: Jean-Philippe Boucicaut; Liz Canning; Ian Inaba
- Music by: Michael Bearden
- Distributed by: Guerrilla News Network
- Release date: September 22, 2006
- Running time: 92 minutes
- Country: United States
- Language: English

American Blackout (2006) is a documentary film directed by Ian Inaba. It premiered at the 2006 Sundance Film Festival. The film chronicles the 2002 defeat, and 2004 reelection, of Congresswoman Cynthia McKinney to the U.S. House of Representatives; it also discusses issues surrounding alleged voter disenfranchisement and the use of voting machines in both the 2000 and 2004 presidential elections.

== Background ==
The film focuses heavily on McKinney, and claims that her 2002 loss in a Democratic primary to Denise Majette (who, like McKinney, is African-American) was part of an effort to disenfranchise minority voters. McKinney claims that Republican voters in her district tipped the primary election to Majette. This itself is legal, as Georgia law opens primaries to all voters irrespective of party. After losing, McKinney filed a lawsuit claiming that open primaries are a violation of the 14th Amendment, but a court dismissed the case.

The film also includes civil rights leader and U.S. Representative John Lewis with a powerful recounting of the march from Selma to Montgomery Alabama across the Edmund Pettus Bridge. Also future Presidential Candidate Bernie Sanders appears in this documentary speaking about the desire of big money to keep voter turnout low. The documentary won the Special Jury Prize (Documentary Jury) at the 2006 Sundance Film Festival.

== Reception ==
Upon its release, the film received generally favorable reviews from contemporary cinema critics, with a score of 77% on review aggregate site Rotten Tomatoes, based on 13 reviews. The New York Times designated the documentary as a "NYT Critics' Pick", with critic Jeannette Catsoulis writing that although it is "occasionally inflammatory", the film is not "a conspiracy rant", but rather "a methodical compilation of questions and irregularities that deserves a wider audience".

=== Awards ===
The film was awarded a Special Jury Prize at the 2006 Sundance Film Festival.

== See also ==
- Civil rights
- Voting rights
- Guerrilla News Network
- Hacking Democracy
