= Video the Vote =

Video the Vote is a nonpartisan grassroots organization launched in 2006 to document problems at the U.S. polls on election day. Video the Vote ensures timely, complete, and accurate reporting of voter suppression and election irregularities by organizing citizen journalists to document elections in their communities.

== Background ==
Video the Vote was created by Ian Inaba of the Guerrilla News Network, John Wellington Ennis of Shoot First, Inc., and James Rucker of ColorOfChange.org. The three originally sought to provide a platform to help independent filmmakers coordinate their efforts on election day—documenting election problems and pushing those stories into the mainstream media. The idea morphed into a populist program where ordinary people could participate. They'd simply agree to be on-call to document any Election Day problems that arise in their area; the only requirements being having a digital video recorder, a cell phone, and broadband Internet access, and agreeing to respect governing election law. In 2006, Video the Vote was active in the following states: Arizona, California, Colorado, Connecticut, District of Columbia, Florida, Maryland, Missouri, New Jersey, New York, Ohio, Pennsylvania, Tennessee, Texas, and Virginia.

== Organizations involved ==
- presente.org
- ColorOfChange
- Ustream
- Mother Jones
- Vote Riders
- 18MillionRising.org
- Election Protection
- MoveOn.org
- RockTheVote
- National Organization for Women
- Brennan Center For Justice
- Leadership Conference on Civil and Human Rights
- Lawyers Committee on Civil Rights Under Law
