= Arthur Milton Robins =

American painter and sculptor

Arthur Milton Robins (born October 23, 1953) is an American painter and sculptor. He is known for his series of Pool Room paintings as well as his involvement in Bery v. City of New York, a federal lawsuit settled by the Supreme Court of the United States in 1997.

== Career ==
Robins is known for his Pool Room paintings, which he says were inspired by his uncle’s pool room in Brooklyn, New York. He is also known for his vast array and depiction of cityscapes, inspired by New York City living. Art critic Donald Kuspit called his series of Tunnel Paintings, “A new breakthrough in Expressionist Painting History.’’

In 1980, Robins performed a one-man show in the lobby of a U.S. federal courthouse, which was so controversial it made news across the country. The Metropolitan Museum of Art and the Museum of the City of New York both own works by Robins.

=== Bery v. City of New York, Lederman v. City of New York ===
In 1993, Robins was a co-founder of A.R.T.I.S.T (Artists Response To Illegal State Tactics) and a main litigant of a First Amendment lawsuit that was settled by the Supreme Court of the United States in 1997. This settlement opened the way for thousands of artists in New York City to show and sell their work on the street of New York City without a permit or license.

=== 2005 controversy ===
In 2005, Robins was accused of illegally placing art on the walls of the Metropolitan Museum of Art. The works supposedly threatened the President George W. Bush and included a written letter and white powder. Arthur was detained at the Museum. Later that night, five detectives entered Arthur’s apartment and interrogated him at length. Arthur recorded this event and the story ended up on the front page of The New York Times. Robins was never charged. He later played himself in the docudrama This Revolution on events related to this issue.
