= This Revolution =

2005 film directed by Stephen Marshall

- Directed by: Stephen Marshall
- Written by: Stephen Marshall
- Produced by: Guerrilla News Network
- Starring: Rosario Dawson; Nathan Crooker; Amy Redford; Brett DelBuono; Brendan Sexton III; Immortal Technique
- Distributed by: Universal Studios
- Release date: January 2005 (Sundance Film Festival)
- Running time: 95 minutes
- Country: United States
- Language: English

This Revolution is a 2005 political film directed by Stephen Marshall and starring Rosario Dawson.

== Plot ==
Jake Cassevetes (Nathan Crooker) is a world-renowned cameraman who has just arrived back from being embedded during the U.S. invasion of Iraq. Jake does not buy into the theory of a corporate-controlled press. Though, after having much of his best footage in Iraq censored by the network, Jake is growing disillusioned with his corporate masters. During this, Jake befriends a boy (Brett DelBuono) and in time meets his mother, Tina Santiago (Rosario Dawson), a pretty young widow whose husband died while serving in Iraq, with whom he forms a close bond.

Jake gets an assignment to shoot on the streets of the Republican National Convention protests. There he meets Seven, one of the young leaders of a masked anarchist Black Bloc. Jake quickly wins the trust of the group and is allowed to shadow them as they move through the demonstration. Later that night, after shooting Seven with her mask down describing the Bloc's militant objectives, the videotape is returned to the network with the rest of his footage by Jake's girlfriend and co-worker Chloe (Amy Redford), without Jake's permission. When he goes to retrieve the tape, he is told the network made a deal with the Department of Homeland Security to review all footage to look for potential terror suspects. It is in fact being used to compile a database of activists. Realizing the danger he has brought to Seven and the Black Bloc, Jake decides to use his skills and access at the network to jam the government-controlled corporate media and broadcast the truth of the protests and the message of a new generation of activists.

== Reception ==
On the review aggregator website Rotten Tomatoes, 18% of 11 critics' reviews are positive. Metacritic, which uses a weighted average, assigned the film a score of 36 out of 100, based on 8 critics, indicating "generally unfavorable" reviews.
