= John Wellington Ennis =

American filmmaker and activist (born 1973)

- Born: February 21, 1973 (age 53); Los Angeles, California, U.S.
- Other name: John Ennis
- Occupations: Filmmaker, activist, blogger
- Known for: Documentary films, Blogging

John Wellington Ennis (born February 21, 1973, in Los Angeles, California) is an American filmmaker, activist, and blogger. In 2004, he directed a film starring Amy Poehler and the Upright Citizens Brigade titled Wild Girls Gone. He is the co-founder of Video the Vote, a non-partisan group interested in documenting problems at U.S. polls. Ennis and Video the Vote co-created Free for All, a 2008 documentary about fraud in U.S. elections. He is also the founder of Shoot First, Inc., a film production company. His latest film is Pay 2 Play: Democracy's High Stakes, a feature-length documentary about the corrupting influence of money in our political system, featuring Robert Reich, Lawrence Lessig, John Nichols, Marianne Williamson and more...

Ennis has produced and developed reality television for FremantleMedia, RDF Media, and Nash Entertainment, and his work has been seen on NBC, Fox, CBS, ABC, TLC, BBC, and The Oprah Winfrey Show. Ennis’s New York City Toolz of the New School was a cult hit in the late 1990s. Ennis has produced many musical documentary, with many of today’s artists, such as Weezer, Linkin Park, Fall Out Boy, Fergie, John Mayer, Jane’s Addiction, Ne-Yo, Sarah McLachlan, Jack Johnson, Red Hot Chili Peppers, Audioslave and others.

== Filmography ==
Year	Film	Credited as				
Year	Film	Director	Producer	Editor	Cinematographer	Notes
1999	X-in Concert		Yes		Yes	Television
2000	The Cindy Margolis Show		Yes			Television
2002	Meet My Folks		Yes			Television
2002	Moist Book	Yes	Yes	Yes	Yes	
2002	Get Lucky Lampshades	Yes	Yes	Yes	Yes	
2003	Faking It	Yes	Yes			Television
2003	The Masked Champion IV	Yes	Yes	Yes		
2003	The Test	Yes				
2003	The Eligible Gentleman	Yes	Yes	Yes		
2004	The Complex: Malibu		Yes			Television
2004	The Sensual Lover of Bindalele	Yes				
2005	Next Big Thing: The 2 Skinnee J's Farewell Show	Yes		Yes	Yes	
multiple	The Oprah Winfrey Show		Yes			Television
2006	Money Talks: Profits Before Patient Safety	Yes		Yes	Yes	
2006	Madison Rose		Yes	Yes	Yes	Television
2007	Wild Girls Gone	Yes	Yes	Yes		
2008	The Writers Room	Yes				
2008	Free For All	Yes	Yes	Yes		
2014	Pay 2 Play: Democracy's High Stakes	Yes	Yes	Yes		
