= The Four Seasons (Arcimboldo) =

Painting series by Giuseppe Arcimboldo

The Seasons or The Four Seasons is a set of four paintings produced in 1563, 1572 and 1573 by the Italian artist Giuseppe Arcimboldo. He offered the set to Maximilian II, Holy Roman Emperor in 1569, accompanying The Four Elements. Each shows a profile portrait made up of fruit, vegetables and plants relating to the relevant season. The set was accompanied by a poem by Giovanni Battista Fonteo (1546–1580) explaining their allegorical meaning.

Only Winter and Summer survive from the original work – these are now in the Kunsthistorisches Museum in Vienna. The Louvre has a full set of the copies made by the painter for Maximilian to send to Augustus of Saxony – these have a floral frame not used in the original version. Spring also survives from a set copied for Philip II of Spain – it is now in the Real Academia de San Fernando in Madrid.

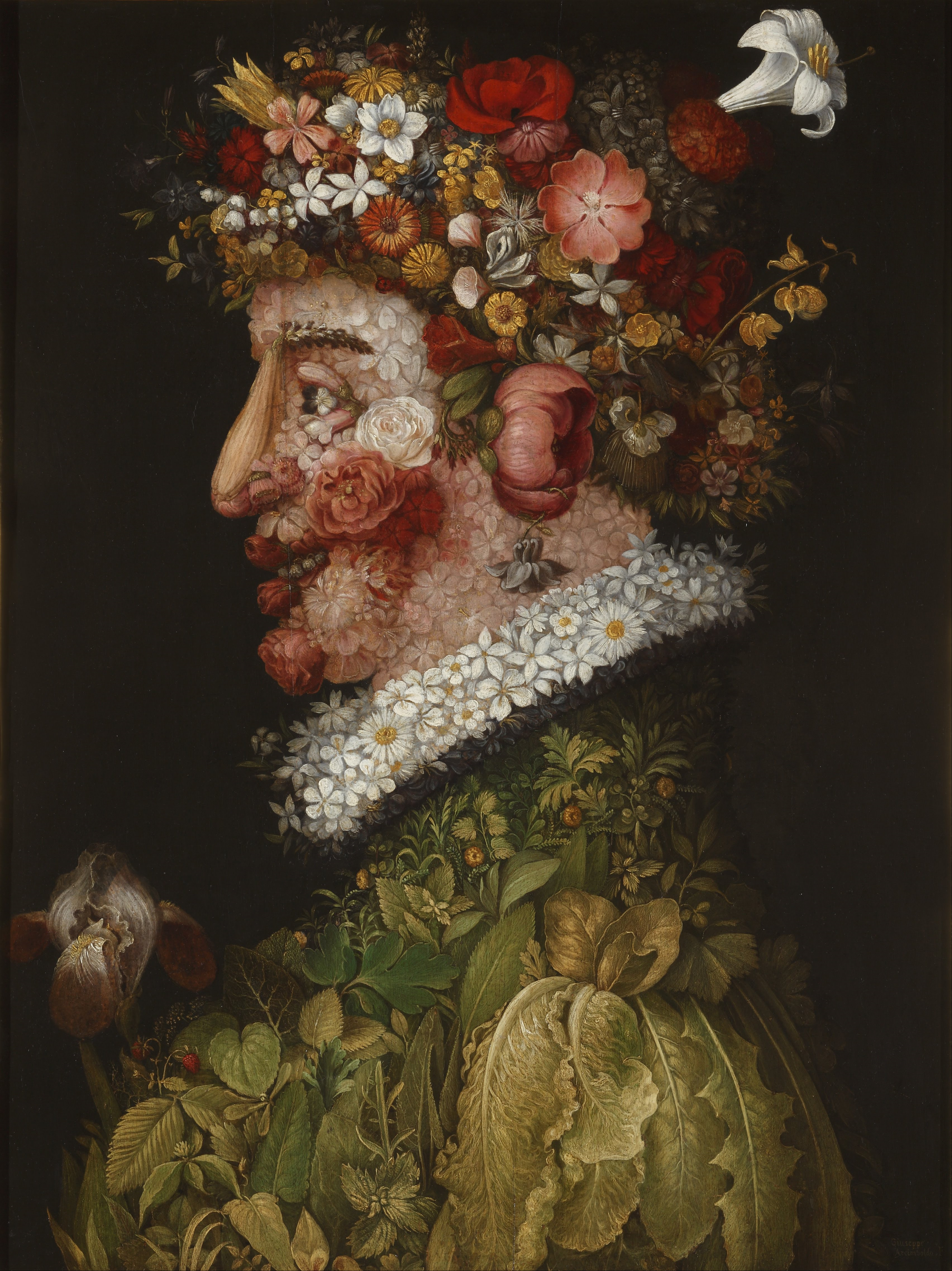
Spring, 1563 Real Academia de Bellas Artes de San Fernando, Madrid

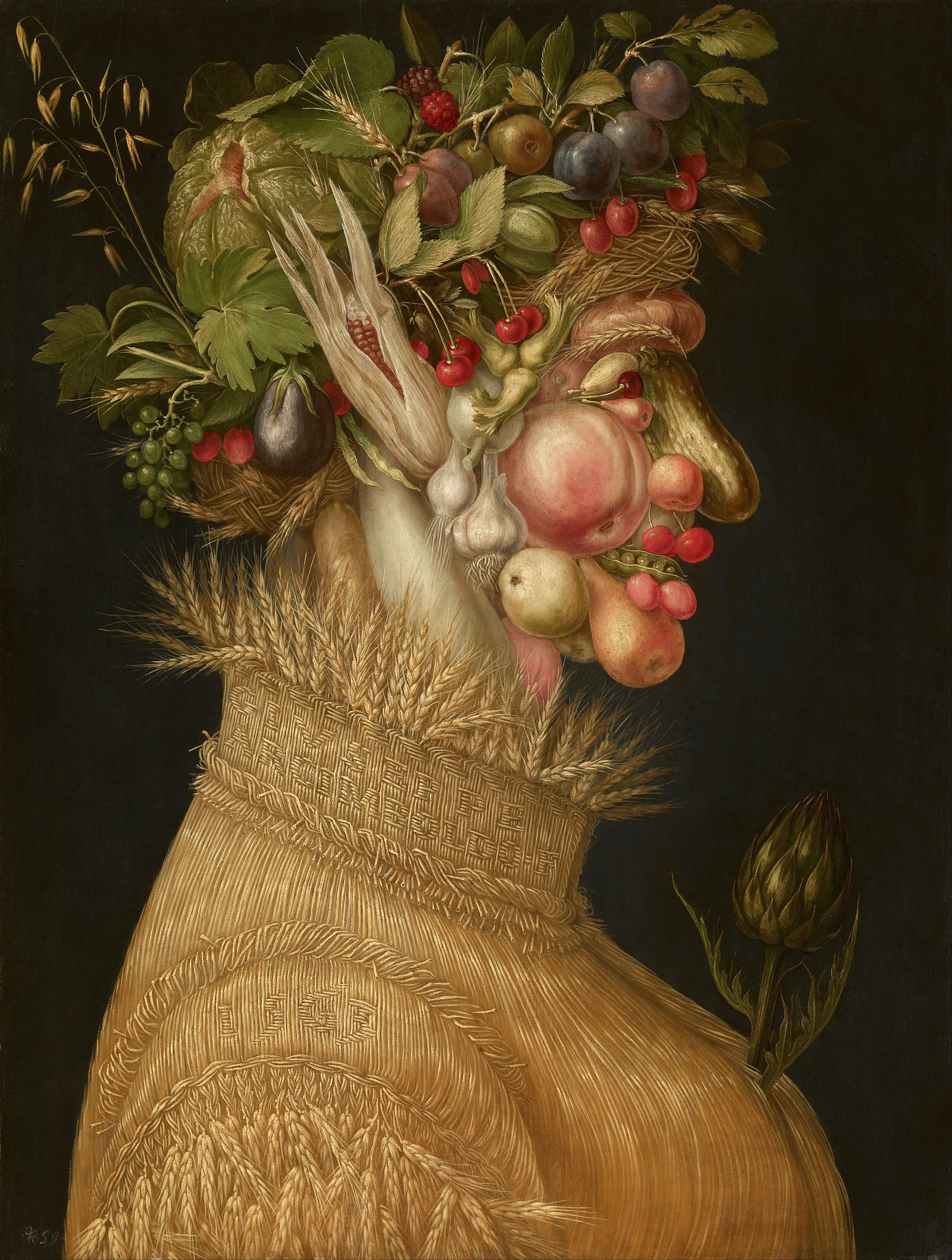
Summer, 1563, Kunsthistorisches Museum, Vienna

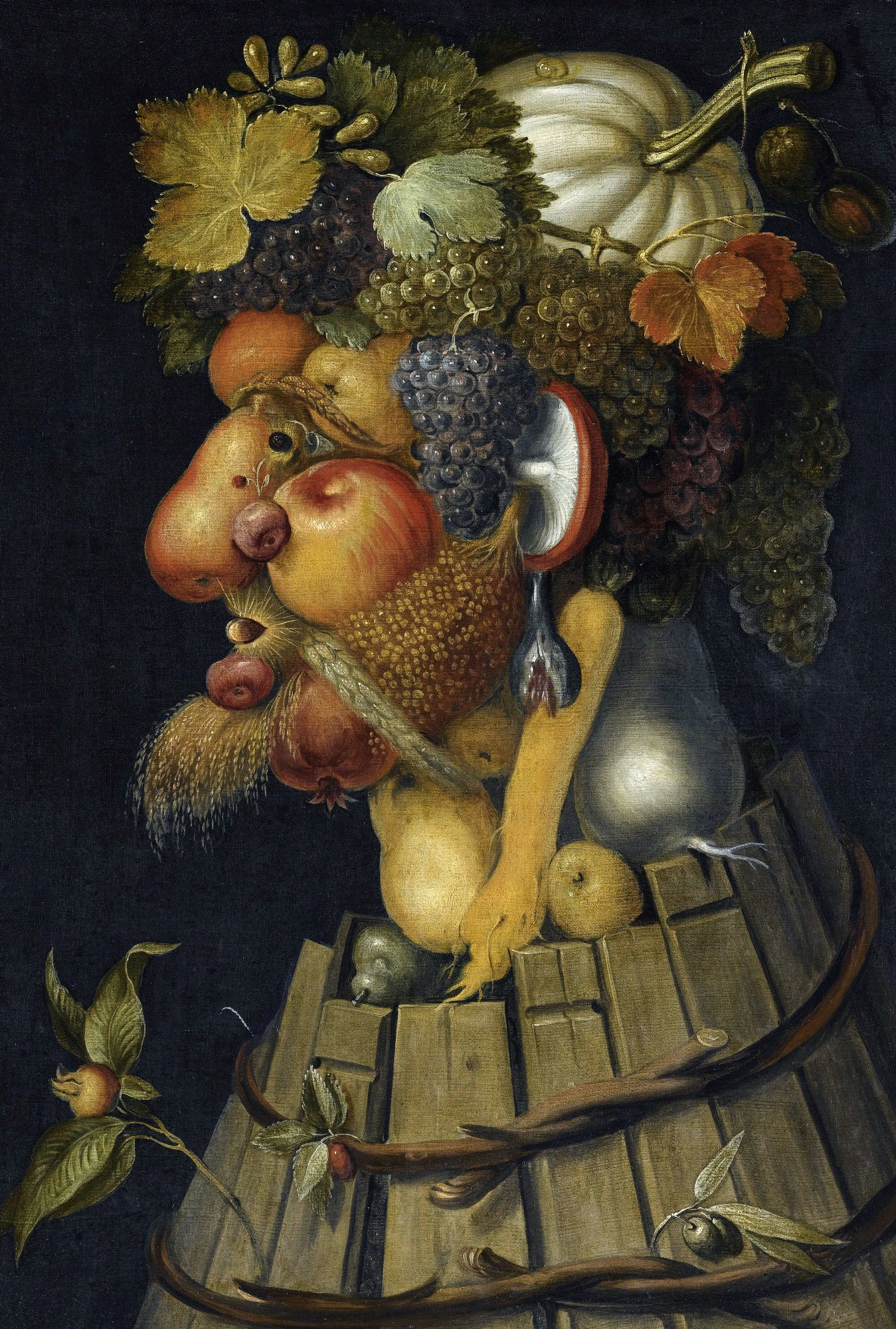
Autumn, 1573, Louvre, Paris

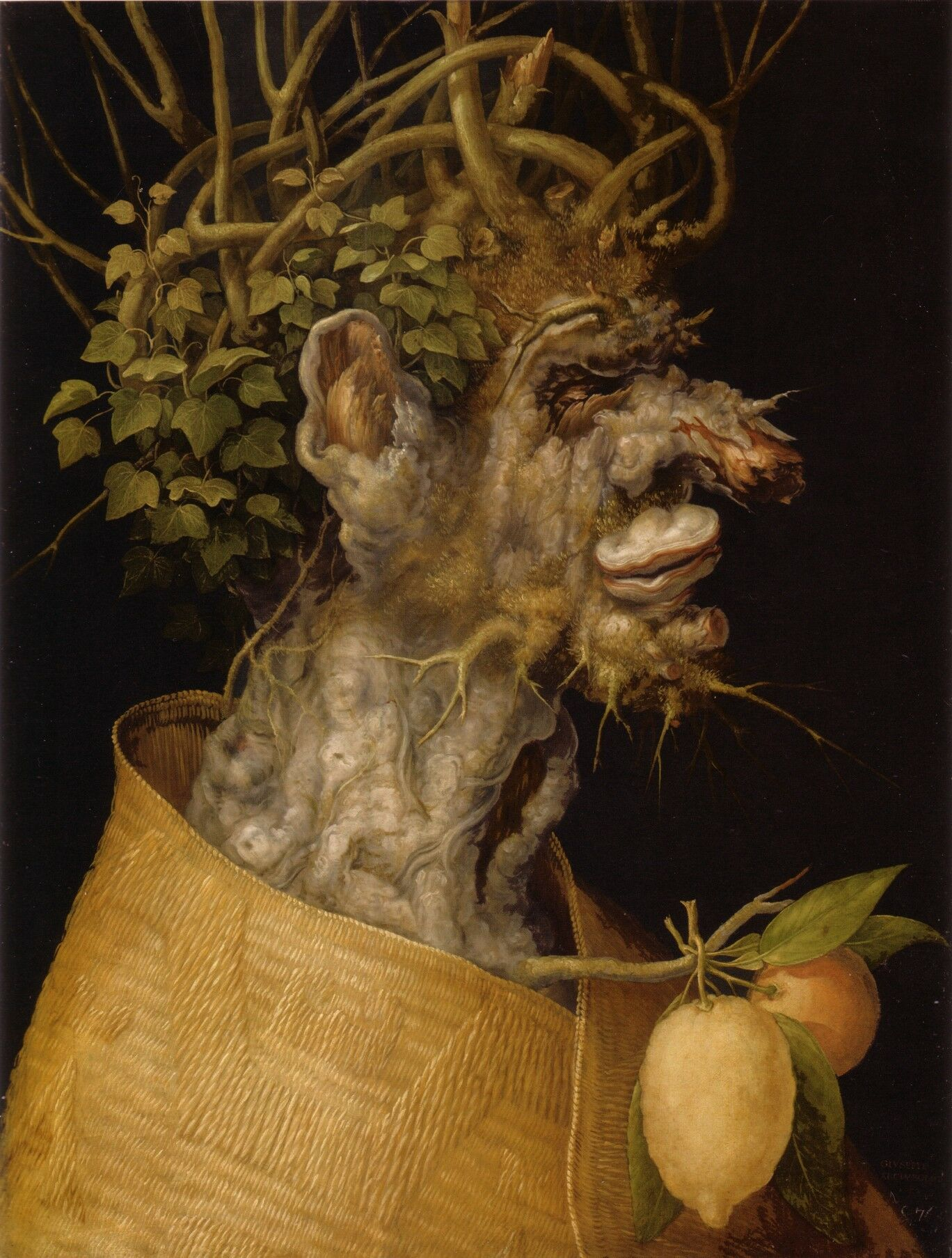
Winter, 1563, Kunsthistorisches Museum, Vienna

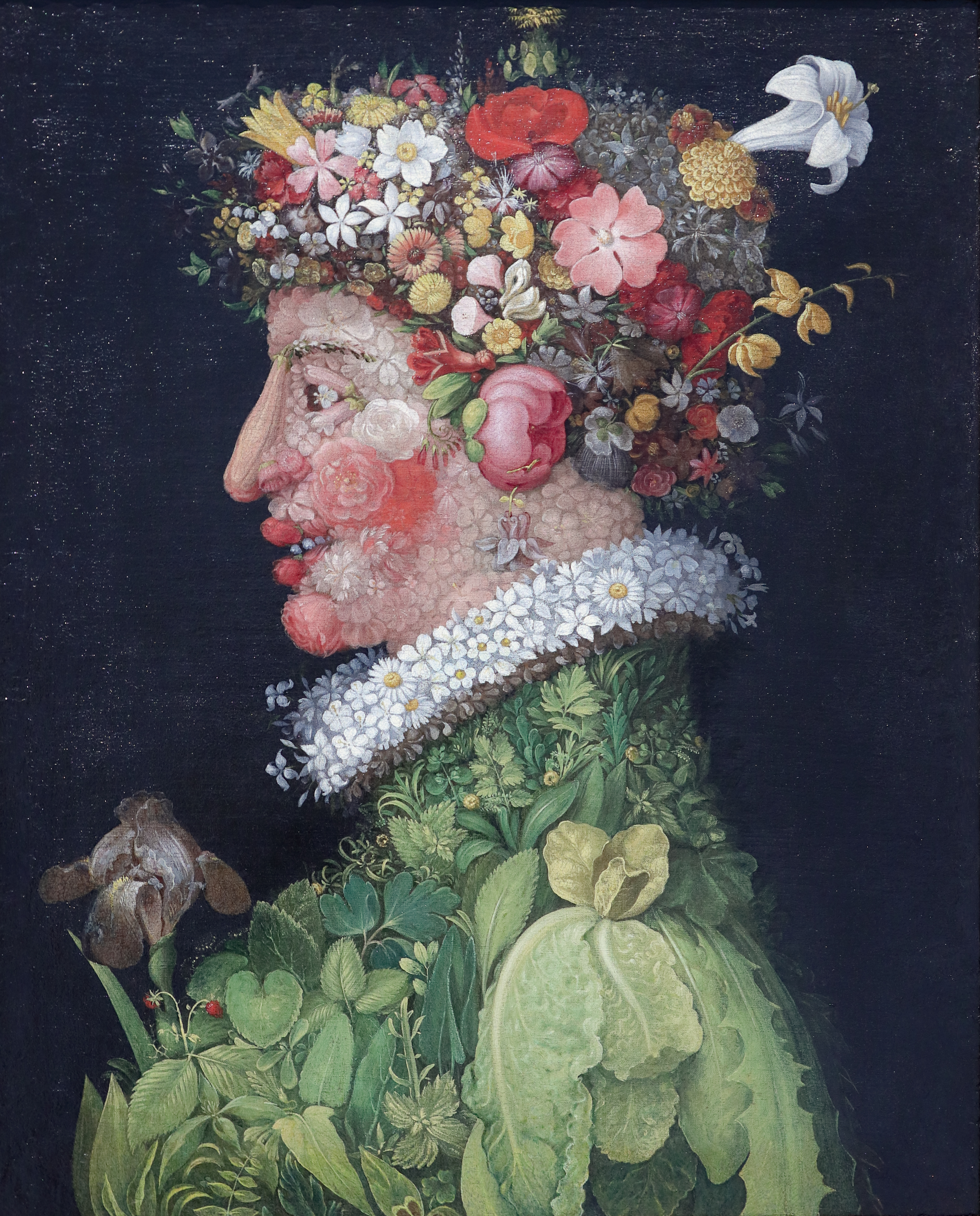
Spring - Louvre Lens

Spring is represented by the image of a woman made up of a wide variety of flowers, with her head facing left. The whole figure is composed of flowers, the skin of the face and lips are rose petals and buds, the hair is a colorful and lush bouquet, the eyes are belladonna berries. A daisy necklace adorns the neck, while the body is covered in a vast jungle of leaves of different shapes.

Summer is also depicted by a woman who, unlike Spring, is facing right and is made up, not of flowers, but of fruits and vegetables. Cherries adorn the border of her hair and also make up her upper lip; her cheek is made of a peach, her nose of a cucumber, her ear of an eggplant and her eyebrow of an ear of wheat. Her dress is made of straw, with, on the Louvre copy, the inscription GIUSEPPE ARCIMBOLDO F (F standing for FECIT) on the collar and the year 1563 on the shoulder. An artichoke decorates her chest.

Autumn is represented by a surly man with rough features looking to the left. The neck, made up of two pears and some vegetables, emerges from a partially destroyed vat, whose wooden slats are bound together with willow branches. His face is made of apples and pears, especially the cheek and nose, his chin is a pomegranate, while the ear is a mushroom, with a fig-shaped earring. The lips and mouth are made of chestnuts. His hair is made up of bunches of grapes and his bonnet of a pumpkin.

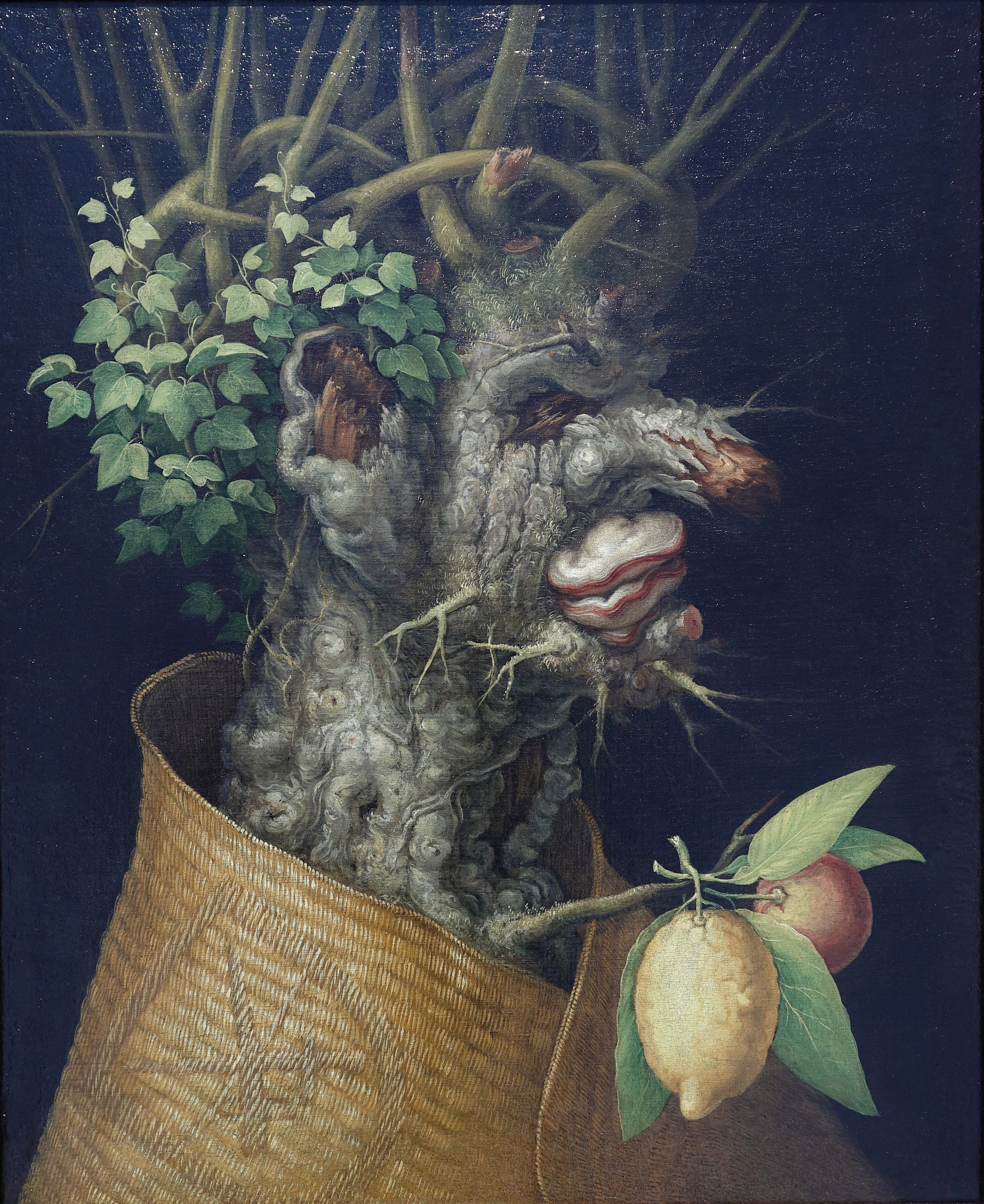
Winter, Louvre

Winter is represented as an old man, whose skin is a gnarled trunk, with the abrasions and swellings of the wood representing the skin wrinkles of old age. The beard, thin and poorly groomed, is composed of small branches and roots; the mouth of two mushrooms. The eye is a black cleft in the log and the ear what remains of a broken branch; his hair is a tangle of branches, accompanied on the back by a series of small leaves. His bare figure is animated only by the colors of lemon and orange, hanging on a branch from the man's chest, citrus being the only winter fruit in Italy.

The man's dress is a simple straw mat: in the original version of the painting the old man wore a cape on which was inscribed an M and a crown, in this case certainly a memory of Maximilian II. Winter, the first season of the year in the Roman Calendar and therefore the most important of the four, was associated with the emperor even more directly among contemporaries.

This series is analogous to another of Arcimboldo's sets called The Four Elements. Both series have the same number of pieces, and logically correspond to each other; Air to Spring, Fire to Summer, Earth to Autumn and Water to Winter. This pairing creates linked themes of chaos brought into harmony and the glorification of the Habsburg dynasty.

In the early 20th century, Arcimboldo's work was relegated to the category of "macabre mockery" of Leonardo da Vinci's cartoonish designs, which perhaps Arcimboldo saw in Milan. The painter was probably not inspired by the composition of their heads, but the links between the two artists are unclear.

== Sources ==
- https://www.sanford-artedventures.com/study/2007_10_Arcimboldo.pdf
- Article partly based on the equivalent article in Spanish Wikipedia, Las cuatro estaciones (Arcimboldo)
