= Chronic Future (album) =

Studio album by Chronic Future
- Released: September 9, 1996
- Length: 39:31
- Labels: Retrograde (original); Beyond (reissue)
- Producer: Jay Lean

Chronic Future chronology
Chronic Future (1996)	4 Elements (2000)

Singles from Chronic Future
- 1. "Insomniac" Released: 1997

Professional ratings
Review scores
Source	Rating
Allmusic	2.5/5 stars

Chronic Future is the self-titled debut album by American rap rock band Chronic Future, first released in 1996. Upon its re-release as Chronic by Tommy Boy Records in 1997, the band became more widely known for hits including "Scottsdale" and "Insomniac". The album was notable for the young age of the band members, who were in their early teens.

== Background ==
The original debut album was released on September 9, 1996. As of March 6, 1997, the four band members had an average age of only 14.5. It was released on Retrograde, an indie label local to Phoenix, Arizona. The album became an instant success in the Southwest region, selling 2,000 records in Arizona alone within a 6-week period. It also received airplay on 157 college radio stations and on KEDJ-FM in Phoenix.

The album was re-released by Beyond Music on August 12, 1997, as simply Chronic with an alternate track listing, also featuring one extra track titled "Buster Brown". The re-released version was released by Tommy Boy Records.

A video was recorded for the track "Insomniac", featuring the band playing at the Icehouse, a warehouse in downtown Phoenix which was lit up with "enough electricity to light up Vegas". To date, it is one of only two Chronic Future music videos, the other being the video for "Time and Time Again" from the album Lines in My Face.

== Track listing ==
All lyrics written by Mike Busse.

Chronic Future track listing

No.	Title	Music	Length
1.	"Star Spangled Lie"	Ben Collins	3:29
2.	"Surreal"	Ben Collins	3:20
3.	"Power"	Ben Collins, Brandon Lee	3:33
4.	"Scottsdale"	Ben Collins	2:46
5.	"Miles to Go Before We Sleep"	Ben Collins	4:16
6.	"Dare"	Ben Collins	2:42
7.	"Insomniac"	Ben Collins, Brandon Lee	2:57
8.	"Girlie Song"	Chronic Future	3:08
9.	"Obstruction"	Ben Collins, Barry Collins	2:32
10.	"McGoo"	Mike Busse, Barry Collins, Ben Collins	2:48
11.	"Drunk Babysitter"	Mike Busse, Barry Collins, Ben Collins	2:42
12.	"Ode to the Pigs"	Ben Collins	3:17
13.	"Newt"	Barry Collins, Ben Collins	1:41

Chronic reissue track listing

No.	Title	Music	Length
1.	"Insomniac"	Ben Collins, Brandon Lee	2:57
2.	"Surreal"	Ben Collins	3:20
3.	"Power"	Ben Collins, Brandon Lee	3:33
4.	"Scottsdale"	Ben Collins	2:46
5.	"Miles to Go Before We Sleep"	Ben Collins	4:16
6.	"Buster Brown"	Ben Collins	3:04
7.	"Dare"	Ben Collins	2:42
8.	"Star Spangled Lie"	Ben Collins	3:29
9.	"Girlie Song"	Chronic Future	3:08
10.	"Obstruction"	Ben Collins, Barry Collins	2:32
11.	"McGoo"	Mike Busse, Barry Collins, Ben Collins	2:48
12.	"Drunk Babysitter"	Mike Busse, Barry Collins, Ben Collins	2:42
13.	"Ode to the Pigs"	Ben Collins	3:17
14.	"Newt"	Barry Collins, Ben Collins	1:41

== Reception ==
The Tucson Citizen described the Chronic Future album as having "hints of Rage Against the Machine, The Smashing Pumpkins, and 311.

== Personnel ==
=== Members ===
- Mike Busse – lead vocals, backing vocals
- Ben Collins – lead vocals, guitar, backing vocals
- Brandon Lee – bass guitar, backing vocals
- Barry Collins – drums, percussion

=== Other Personnel ===
- John Villagomez – art direction, design, imaging
- Mike Woods – assistant engineer
- Jay Lean – producer, engineer, mixing
- Pat Amore – engineer
