= This and of That =

Studio album by Chronic Future
- Released: 2006
- Recorded: 2005–2006
- Length: 39:48
- Label: Self-released
- Producer: Ben Collins

Chronic Future chronology
Lines in My Face (2004)	This and of That (2006)	Modern Art EP (2008)

This and of That is the fourth album by American rap rock band Chronic Future. It was released in 2006, and consisted of new songs, as well as several re-recorded versions of songs that had originally been recorded and released by the band on their website. The album was limited to 1,000 copies. The album was self-released, and produced by Ben Collins. The album featured Ryan Breen as a collaborating artist. Sputnikmusic rated the album 4/5.

== Track listing ==
All lyrics are written by Mike Busse; all music is composed by Chronic Future, except where noted.

No.	Title	Music	Length
1.	"All Things Considered"		3:43
2.	"Temper Anthem"		3:48
3.	"Shellshocked (remix)"	Ryan Breen	6:23
4.	"Home Game"		3:06
5.	"If You Ever Run"		3:47
6.	"Flight of the Birds"		4:15
7.	"Jupiter (Future Lords)"		1:46
8.	"Insects"		3:42
9.	"The Summer of 1980"		3:18
10.	"Antarctica"		5:56

== Personnel ==
=== Members ===
- Mike Busse - lead vocals, backing vocals
- Ben Collins - lead vocals on tracks 3, 5 and 10, guitar, backing vocals
- Brandon Lee - lead vocals, bass guitar, backing vocals
- Barry Collins - drums, percussion

=== Other Personnel ===
- Ryan Breen - programming
