= Emancipation (2011 film) =

2011 film by Philipp Müller-Dorn

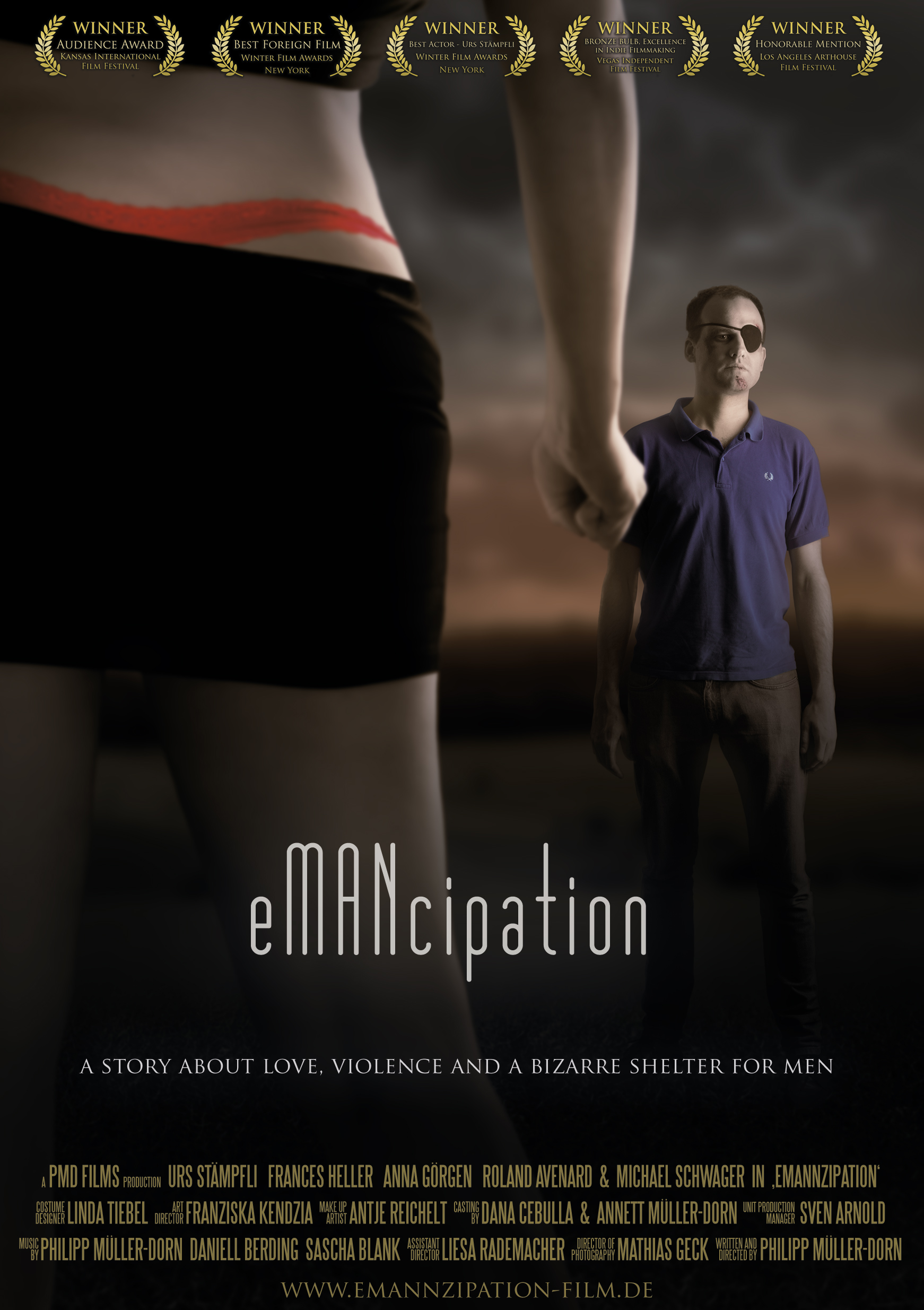
- Film poster
- German: Emannzipation
- Directed by: Philipp Müller-Dorn
- Written by: Philipp Müller-Dorn
- Produced by: PMD Films
- Starring: Urs Stämpfli, Frances Heller, Michael Schwager, Roland Avenard
- Cinematography: Mathias Geck
- Edited by: Malte Muller
- Music by: Sascha Blank, Philipp Müller-Dorn, Daniell Berdding
- Release date: October 13, 2011 (Kansas International Film Festival)
- Running time: 116 minutes
- Country: Germany
- Language: German

Emancipation or eMANcipation (German: Emannzipation; styled as eMANNzipation) is a 2011 independent drama feature film directed by Philipp Müller-Dorn. The movie had its world premiere on October 25, 2011 at the Kansas International Film Festival where it won the Audience Award for Best Narrative Film.

Müller-Dorn initially came up with the idea for the film in 2006 after reading a newspaper article about a shelter for abused men in Hamburg. Since it turned out to be difficult to find abused men who were willing to talk about their experiences, the research phase took a lot longer than Müller-Dorn expected and the screenplay of eMANcipation was finished in early 2010. Principal shooting took place in Berlin and Guxhagen in Northern Hessia in July and August 2010.

From 2012 to 2020 eMANcipation was released on DVD and Blu-ray in the USA distributed by Olive Films. Since fall 2021 it is available on Amazon Video, Apple TV, Google Play, Microsoft Store in 56 countries around the world.

== Cast ==
- Urs Stämpfli as Dominik
- Frances Heller as Angela
- Michael Schwager as Holger
- Roland Avernard as Gregor
- Anna Görgen as Belinda
- Peer Alexander Hauck as Lukas
- Jan Marc Kochmann as Andreas
- Ulrich Meyer als Diplom-Psychologe Bohr
- Hans Ulrich Laux as Horst
- Yannik Burwiek as Dylan

== Synopsis ==
Dominik Liebmann is a man at the end of his rope. He has seemingly lost all he had: his job, his house, his wife, his son, his fortune and even his dignity. Without a penny in his pocket he enters Berlin's only shelter for battered men. He meets Holger, the head of the 'Männerhaus' and its members. After a psychiatric evaluation by the youth welfare office, he is ordered to engage in the group therapy session of the men's shelter so he can get custody for Dylan, his son. After an initial reluctance Dominik participates and talks about his past:

While on a holiday in Northern-Hessia Dominik meets Angela: a 19-year old blonde, pretty face and a direct but charming demeanour. The sympathy grows into passion and they become a couple. When visiting Berlin later Angela announces to Dominik that she is pregnant, so he proposes. But the marital heaven turns rapidly to marital hell. Angela becomes loud, abusive, addicted to alcohol and starts to blow Dominik’s money while he is busy providing for his family. He tries to talk to Angela about her behaviour but to no avail. He just tries to avoid her progressively violent moods and her extreme rage. Angela’s violent behavior escalates. Angela leaves Dominik and takes their son Dylan with him.

In these sessions Dominik describes the marital abuse he suffered, but he still justifies and defends Angela's cruel behavior. At Holger's insistence Doninik decides to sign up for karate class. There he meets Belinda a divorced lawyer with two daughters. They start to date, but Domink has difficulties opening himself up, is avoiding uncomfortable truths of the past and keeps on justifying his wife’s abusive behaviours.

Dominik finally manages to break out of his own vicious circle of denial: realizing Angela’s behavior was indeed abusive, but more importantly that he allowed himself to be victimized and that he added to the violent dynamics with passivity and his lack of taking responsibility.

With Belinda's help Dominik gets the custody of his son, gets his old job back and moves out of the men’s shelter to start a new life with his son, Belinda and her kids.

== Reception ==
Critical reception for Emancipation has been mostly positive. Robert Butler of butlercinamescene.com considers it one of the best films of the KIFF. Erin Tuttle compares the visual style of the film to Jean-Pierre Jeunet. Amos Lassen praises the performances as "wonderful" and calls it "a film that really opens our eyes".

== Awards ==
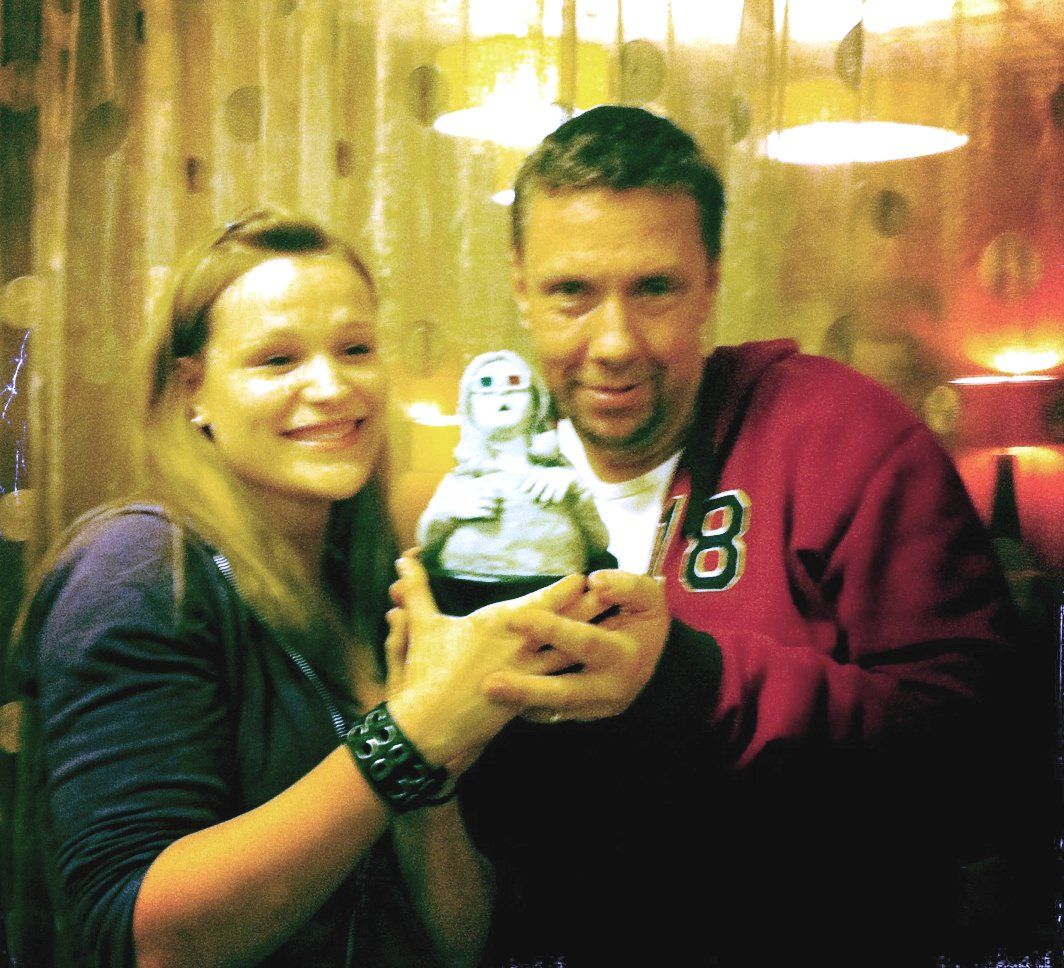
Actress Frances Heller and director Philipp Müller-Dorn receive the KIFF statue for the Audience Award at the 2011 Kansas International Film Festival

- WINNER Audience Award, Kansas International Film Festival
- WINNER Best Dramatic Film, IFS Film Festival Hollywood
- WINNER Excellence Award, Rincon International Film Festival Puerto Rico
- WINNER Best Foreign Film, New York Winter Film Awards
- WINNER Best Actor Urs Stämpfli, New York Winter Film Awards
- WINNER Best Foreign Film, International Festival of World Cinema, Kent, England
- WINNER Award of Merit, Lucerne International Film Festival, Switzerland
- WINNER Bronze Bulb, Excellence in Indie Filmmaking, Vegas Independent Film Festival
- WINNER Director’s Choice Award, Litchfiels Hills Film Festival, Kent, Connecticut
- WINNER Indie Auteur Medallion for Excellence, Bare Bones Film Festival, Oklahoma
- NOMINATED Best Director: Philipp Müller-Dorn, International Festival of World Cinema, Kent, England
- NOMINATED Best Cinematography: Mathias Geck, International Festival of World Cinema, Kent, England
- HONORABLE MENTION 60° N International Film Festival, Norway
- HONORABLE MENTION Los Angeles Arthouse Film Festival, USA
- OFFICIAL SELECTION Oaxaca Film Festival, Mexico
- OFFICIAL SELECTION Palm Beach International Film Festival, USA
- OFFICIAL SELECTION Victoria TX Film Festival, USA
- OFFICIAL SELECTION Boston International Film Festival, USA
