= Ian Inaba =

American journalist

Ian Inaba (born 1971) is an American film and music video director, producer, and journalist for the Guerrilla News Network.

== Music videos ==
Inaba directed the music videos for "Mosh" by Eminem and "Time and Time Again" by Chronic Future. He also directed the original music video for the Nine Inch Nails song "The Hand that Feeds." It was never released, however, because the band found the subject matter, which depicted Religious Right extremism, including threats to abortion clinic patients and abuses by religious authorities, too controversial for their tastes. The job then went to Rob Sheridan.

== Books and documentaries ==
Inaba contributed to GNN's book about black box voting, True Lies. He has recently completed a feature-length documentary film about voting irregularities in the 2000 and 2004 U.S. elections entitled American Blackout. The film, released August 2006, received a Special Jury Prize at the 2006 Sundance Film Festival. He was also one of the creators of Video the Vote in 2006.
