= Jessica Vale =

American documentary director, producer, editor and musician

Jessica Vale is an American documentary director, producer, editor and musician.

== Formative years ==
Vale was born circa 1979 in the community of Abington, which is located in Abington Township, Montgomery County, Pennsylvania. She graduated from Temple University in Philadelphia, Pennsylvania in 2000 with a degree in media and film.

== Career ==
Vale's filmography includes the multi-award-winning documentary Small Small Thing (2013), TV series Surviving Death (Netflix) and Wrong Man (Starz), and the film The Sounding (2017) among other projects. As a musician, she has released two studio albums which included two billboard charting dance singles.

During the early years of the twenty-first century, she was a resident of New York City, where she worked in video production.

== Filmography ==
=== Director ===
- 2013: Small Small Thing
- 2013: Al Jazeera Witness: Small Small Thing (TV)

=== Producer ===
- 2013: Small Small Thing
- 2013: Al Jazeera Witness: Small Small Thing

== Awards ==
- 2014 Grand Jury Prize, Rated SR Film Festival
- 2014 Women Film Critics Circle Award
- 2014 Vanya Exerjian Award
- 2014 Special Jury Prize, Pan African Film Festival
- 2013 Best International Documentary, Bronze Lens Film Festival
- 2013 Best Documentary, Kansas International Film Festival
- 2013 Best Documentary, Montreal International Black Film Festival
- 2013 Best Documentary, Baghdad International Film Festival
- 2013 Best Documentary, First Glance Film Festival
- 2013 Special Mention, Dallas International Film Festival

== Band members ==
- Jessica Vale - Vocals
- Ivan Evangelista - Guitar
- Matthew St. Joseph - Bass
- Randy Schrager - Drums

== Discography ==
Brand New Disease (October 16, 2007)

1. Black and Blue
2. Lonely Life
3. Exit 12
4. Brand New Disease
5. No Soul
6. Verses from the Rooftop
7. Night in Sarajevo
8. Time Stand Still
9. You Don't Wanna Know
10. Mirror Check
11. Together Alone

The Sex Album (2005)

1. Intro
2. Welcome
3. Boy in Black
4. The One Over There is All Mine
5. Look Pretty
6. Sweet 16
7. Breather
8. Sarajevo
9. Disco Libido (Radio Mix)
10. Microphone
11. Exit
12. Boy in Black (Saphin Remix)
13. Disco Boy (Infinite Volume Remix)
14. Disco Libido (Clean Radio Mix)
15. Boy in Black (Clean)

Disco Libido Remixed EP (2006)

1. Disco Libido (Dave Audé Future Disco Mix)
2. Disco Libido (Josh Harris Remix)
3. Disco Boy (Infinite Volume IDM Mix)
4. Disco Libido (Dirty Evangelist Mix)
5. Disco Libido (JL Cohen Dungeon Mix)
6. Disco Libido (Dave Audé Future Disco Edit)
7. Disco Libido (Dave Audé Future Disco Dub)

Brand New Disease Remixed (2007)

1. Brand New Disease (Jody Den Broeder Club Mix)
2. Brand New Disease (Jody Den Broeder Club Edit).aif
3. Brand New Disease (Jody Den Broeder Club Instrumental)
4. Brand New Disease (McGowan & Moss EMpulsive Mix)
5. Brand New Disease (McGowan & Moss EMpulsive Edit)
6. Brand New Disease (McGowan EMpulsive Tribal Dub)
7. Brand New Disease (McGowan & Moss Padapella)
8. Brand New Disease
