= 4 Elements (album) =

Studio album by Chronic Future
- Released: August 22, 2000
- Recorded: 1999–2000
- Genres: Rap metal; rap rock
- Length: 49:34
- Label: Beyond

Chronic Future chronology
Chronic Future (1996)	4 Elements (2000)	Lines in My Face EP (2004)

4 Elements is the second album by American rap rock band Chronic Future on the Beyond Music label. It was released on August 22, 2000.

== Reception ==
A review in Billboard magazine praised the track "The Majik" from 4 Elements, saying it "is deeper than most other screamin' rap ditties".

Critic Kerry Lengel of The Arizona Republic gave the album 3 1/2 stars. The review suggested that the album "should prove competitive in the national rap-rock race, with polished production and a number of excellent tracks tailor-made for radio". However, Lengel wrote that artistically, the album "reveals that the young players still have some musical maturation to do", lamenting the lack of originality and commenting that the 14 tracks should have been pared down to 10.

The Montreal Gazette was more negative, calling the album a "Lightweight, pop-flavoured teenage metal-rap ripoff".

Professional ratings
Review scores
Source	Rating
Allmusic	1.5/5 stars

== Track listing ==
All lyrics are written by Mike Busse; all music is composed by Chronic Future.

No.	Title	Length
1.	"Jump to Jive"	2:19
2.	"? Up"	2:52
3.	"The Majik"	2:58
4.	"4 Elements"	3:26
5.	"Come Correct"	3:50
6.	"Run for Shelter"	4:06
7.	"Feel it Everyday"	3:41
8.	"Live Again"	4:20
9.	"Impossible to Win"	3:43
10.	"Ways to Sell You Out"	4:06
11.	"The Great Wall"	3:20
12.	"Soul Anthem"	2:41
13.	"Time and Space"	3:47
14.	"WhatchyagonnadoMike?"	3:14

== Personnel ==
=== Members ===
- Mike Busse – lead vocals, backing vocals
- Ben Collins – lead vocals, guitar, backing vocals
- Brandon Lee – bass guitar, backing vocals
- Barry Collins – drums, percussion
