= Holy Wars (film) =

- Film poster
- Directed by: Stephen Marshall
- Produced by: Patrick Milling-Smith Brian Carmody; Lisa Kawamoto Hsu Allison Kunzman
- Starring: Khalid Kelly; Aaron D. Taylor, Sheikh Omar Bakri Muhammad Fostok
- Release date: February 5, 2010 (True/False Film Festival)
- Country: United States
- Language: English

Holy Wars is a 2010 documentary written and directed by Stephen Marshall. In 2009, Marshall was inspired to make the film due to the prevalence of religious fundamentalism during this time period.

== Synopsis ==
Holy Wars is mostly filmed from the perspective of two missionaries, Khalid Kelly and Aaron Taylor. The film takes a look at the religious fundamentalism in Pakistan, Lebanon, United Kingdom, and the United States as well as the decades long conflict between Islam and Christianity. The film features several interviews, including one with author Sam Harris.

== Screenings ==
In 2010 Holy Wars was screened at the 14th Annual IDA Docuweeks Showcase, the Kansas International Film Festival, and at the ArcLight Hollywood Theatre in Los Angeles, Ca.

== Reception and awards ==
Bloomberg and IndieWire both positively reviewed the film, with IndieWire stating that "Holy Wars provides nuanced characters that provoke discussion and self-reflection." The film has also received a positive review from Variety, writing that the film was "a poignant, disturbing reminder of how lonely, and dangerous, the righter-than-thou road can be". Christianity Today called the film "riveting", saying that "what's also fascinating is the journey behind those journeys". The Orlando Sentinel's Roger Moore gave the film 2 1/2 stars, stating "Marshall tries to balance his film with two equally unbending and potentially violent fanatics. He doesn't."

=== Awards ===
Award	Category	Recipient	Result
Kansas International Film Festival 2010	Best Documentary		Won
