= Chronic Future =

American rock band

- Left to right: Brandon Lee, Ben Collins, Mike Busse, Barry Collins

Background information
- Also known as: CF
- Origin: Scottsdale, Arizona, U.S.
- Genres: Rap rock, alternative rock
- Years active: 1995–2009, 2015
- Labels: Retrograde; Beyond; Interscope; Modern Art
- Members: Mike Busse; Ben Collins; Barry Collins; Brandon Lee
- Past members: Ryan Breen; Mike Loy

Chronic Future was an American rock band from Scottsdale, Arizona. The band was formed in 1995, when their average age was 14. They achieved a short period of mainstream success with the 2004 album Lines in My Face, as well as the album's hit single, "Time and Time Again". The band consisted of vocalist Mike Busse, guitarist Ben Collins, bassist Brandon Lee and drummer Barry Collins, who are all founding members.

After finding mainstream success, the band then went on to operate under their own independent label, Modern Art Records, and released the Modern Art EP online under this new label. The band worked very independently after their departure from Interscope Records, rarely playing live and releasing albums independently as well as releasing online demos and purchasable songs. The band's early/mainstream style was a mixture of hip hop and punk rock, but the band progressed into a unique fusion style of hip hop, electronica, and alternative. The band's vocal style incorporated three vocalists: Mike Busse, Ben Collins and Brandon Lee.

== History ==
=== Formation and early history: 1995–2000 ===
Chronic Future began their musical career in the summer of 1995, and a year or so later, they released their first self-titled album when the band members were at an average age of 14. The album gained popular local airplay, but achieved no commercial success. Their followup, 4 Elements, was released in 2000, and was even less successful, with only a few songs being praised. 4 Elements was released on Beyond Records, and the band toured with such bands as Face to Face.

=== Mainstream success: 2000–2004 ===
From 2000 to 2004, the band signed their first major label deal with Interscope Records, and their third full-length was soon to follow in mid-2004. The band released a promotional EP called the Lines in My Face EP, featuring four songs from the album, as well as two rare songs. Soon after, the band released the album Lines in My Face, which reached No. 18 on the Billboard Heatseekers chart. The album's single "Time and Time Again" saw airplay on MTV and MTV2 and reached No. 40 on the Billboard Modern Rock charts, as well as being featured in the video games Burnout 3: Takedown and MVP Baseball 2004.

Earlier during that year, the band recruited Ryan Breen from Back Ted N-Ted, to play second guitar on the road. He joined as a full-time member, but then quit to begin on a solo music project of his own, which later became Back Ted N-Ted. He was replaced by Mike Loy, who after the release and recording of Lines in My Face, left to embark on his own musical ventures.

Notably, Lines in My Face featured more metal-orientated guitar styles, as well as Brandon Lee taking on a role as another lead vocalist.

=== Independent work: 2006–2009 ===
Chronic Future left Interscope Records for an unknown reason in 2006. Several CF members also collaborate with Back Ted N-Ted, although it now appears that Brandon Lee is pulling double duty as a live member of Ryan Breen's solo project Back Ted N-Ted. At around this time, Mike Busse started a solo, hip-hop oriented side project with Charlie Brand of Miniature Tigers called The Future Lords. On October 1, 2006, Ben Collins officially launched Modern Art Records in partnership with Epic Records, but they have now denounced their partnership with Epic Records. Collins signed Back Ted N-Ted, as well as the Miniature Tigers, Brothers Backward, Foxglove Hunt, Gospel Claws and The Future Lords.

The band released a limited edition album, This and of That, in late 2006 for online purchase through their now inactive official website. The band had made a sudden change from their rap rock style to an electronica/alternative/hip-hop crossover style by changing their guitar sounds from the traditional rock sound to an electronic sound. Chronic Future had actually previously experimented with this style and uploaded demos of some of the songs from This and of That to their official website, as well as other unreleased demos. The album was limited to merely 1000 copies. The album featured Ryan Breen, the band's former rhythm guitarist, doing programming.

The band recruited Lawrence Hearn AKA "Daggrr" (live guitarist for Back Ted N-Ted & principle songwriter for The Broadcast Royalties) in 2007 to play rhythm guitar for several shows, though he left shortly in 2008 to support both Miniature Tigers and Back Ted N-Ted's live shows. Chronic Future performed at the West Coast show of The Bamboozle in Irvine, California on April 6, 2008.

Just before the release of the Modern Art EP, the following statement on their Myspace page appeared on October 29, 2008:

We stand by our new material. We are really excited about this EP and nothing is going to change how we feel when we listen back to what we just finished recording. This music is exciting to us! We have never wished to repeat ourselves...we all made a pact a long time ago that we'd rather break up the band then make music that don't inspire our brains. We've never tried to be anything we are not...If you can't accept our new direction, we understand. We still love you all. Feel free to comment away, we welcome your thoughts.

— Chronic Future

On November 11, 2008, an EP entitled Modern Art EP was released on iTunes. The album further demonstrated their crossover style, but with far more melodic music than demonstrated on This and of That. The digital EP featured re-recordings of demos previously uploaded to Chronic Future's website and Myspace page. The song "Rocket Science" was converted into techno/alternative/hip-hop from its original punk/rap style. By popular demand from the band's fans, a limited edition demo compilation, Demoitis, was released in April 2009.

=== Hiatus: 2009–2014 ===
Chronic Future stopped updating their official Myspace page and no information on the band is available on their previous record label's official website. No band activity on their profile has taken place since the July 21, 2009, post about Chronic Future merchandise on their official Myspace page. However, a personal email from guitarist Ben Collins explained that the band members have all moved to New York City and that the Chronic Future project "isn't over yet". According to Ben Collins' personal Facebook page, he had left the band as of January 2010, but reunited several years later with Chronic Future in 2015.

In 2012, backing vocalist and bassist Brandon Lee joined Miniature Tigers for their third record, Mia Pharaoh, as well as recording with them for their fourth album, Cruel Runnings, in 2014. In between the release of the two Miniature Tigers albums, Lee began a new project called The Mathematics, releasing an EP titled Summertime in Babylon on July 8, 2013.

=== Reunion: 2015 ===
On March 12, 2015, Ben Collins tweeted that Chronic Future currently has "no plans to tour, but are having fun together (as we always have) and playing NYC this summer." The show was held at the Bowery Ballroom on July 18, 2015, with Charlie Brand of Miniature Tigers as the opening act.

About a week after the Chronic Future reunion show in New York City, Ben Collins stated on Twitter that he would like to perform another show with Chronic Future in their home city, Phoenix, Arizona, stating it to be a "good idea". The band played their final show in Phoenix, Arizona at the Rebel Lounge on December 26, 2015.

== Members ==
=== Final lineup ===
- Mike Busse – lead vocals, backing vocals (1995–2009, 2015)
- Brandon Lee – lead vocals (2004–2009, 2015), bass guitar, backing vocals (1995–2009, 2015)
- Barry Collins – drums, percussion (1995–2009, 2015)
- Ben Collins – lead vocals (1995–2006, 2015), guitar, backing vocals (1995–2009, 2015)

=== Former members ===
- Ryan Breen – rhythm guitar (2004)
- Mike Loy – rhythm guitar (2004)

=== Touring members ===
- Lawrence "DAGGRR" Hearn – rhythm guitar (2007–2008)

== Discography ==
=== Studio albums ===
- Chronic Future (1996)
- 4 Elements (2000)
- Lines in My Face (2004)
- This and of That (2006)

=== EPs ===
- Lines in My Face EP (2004)
- Modern Art EP (2008)

=== Compilations ===
- Demoitis (2009)

== Media use ==
- Their song "Time and Time Again" was one of the official theme songs for the 2004 WWE Diva Search and was featured on an episode of One Tree Hill, an episode of The Days, and two video games released by Electronic Arts: Burnout 3: Takedown and MVP Baseball 2004 on various platforms.
- The song "Apology for Non-Symmetry", was featured on the Gran Turismo 4 soundtrack.
- The song "Static on the Radio" was also part of the Gretzky Hockey game for the PS2 soundtrack.
- The song "Wicked Games" was featured on the CSI: Miami episode "Crime Wave", during shots of various law enforcement agencies' boats racing to intercept a suspect on the ocean. The song was also featured in Cereal Killerz (a paintball movie) for the professional paintball player Oliver Lang.
