= The Four Elements (Arcimboldo) =

Painting series by Giuseppe Arcimboldo

The Four Elements is a series of four oil paintings by the Italian artist Giuseppe Arcimboldo which were created in 1566, during the Renaissance, for Maximilian II, Holy Roman Emperor. The paintings depict human faces in profile made up from different animals or objects. Air is represented by birds, Fire by burning wood and cannons, Earth by land animals and Water by marine creatures. The series attempts to express the creation of harmony from chaos by the careful arrangement of the wild animals to form portraits whilst also praising Maximilian by suggesting that he is a ruler who controls even the four primal elements.

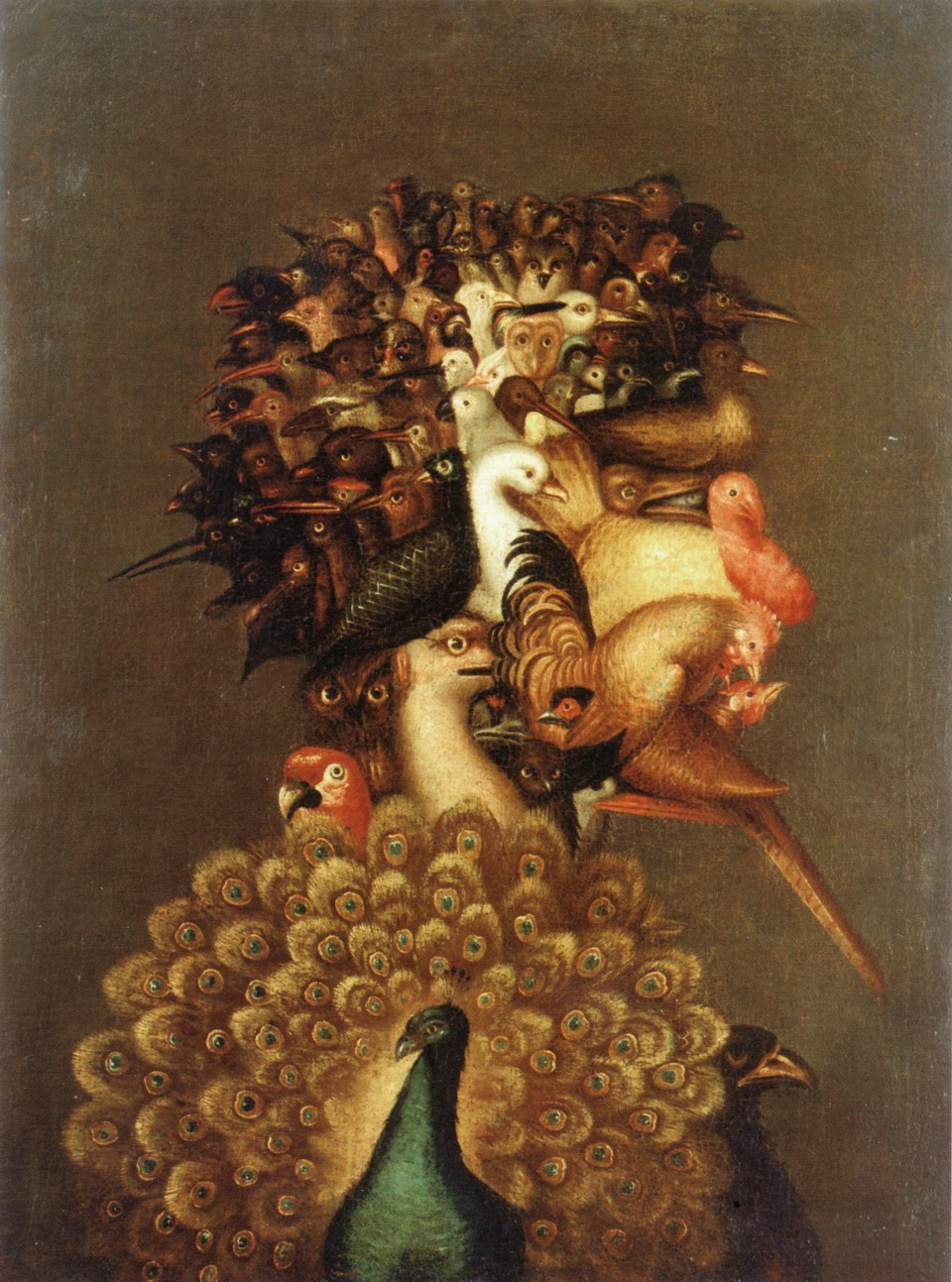
Air, ca. 1566, (copy), private collection

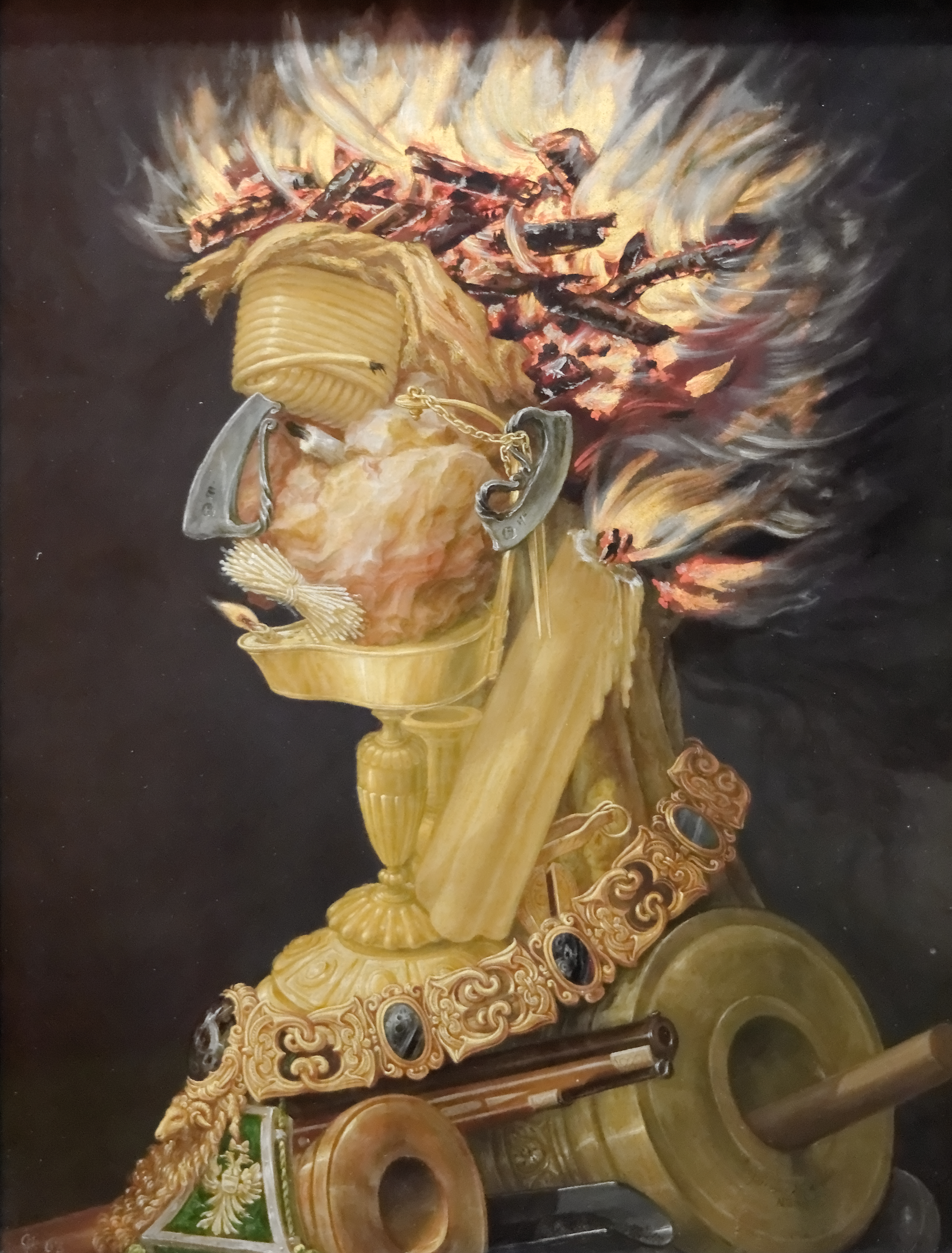
Fire, Oil on Wood, 1566, Kunsthistorisches Museum Vienna

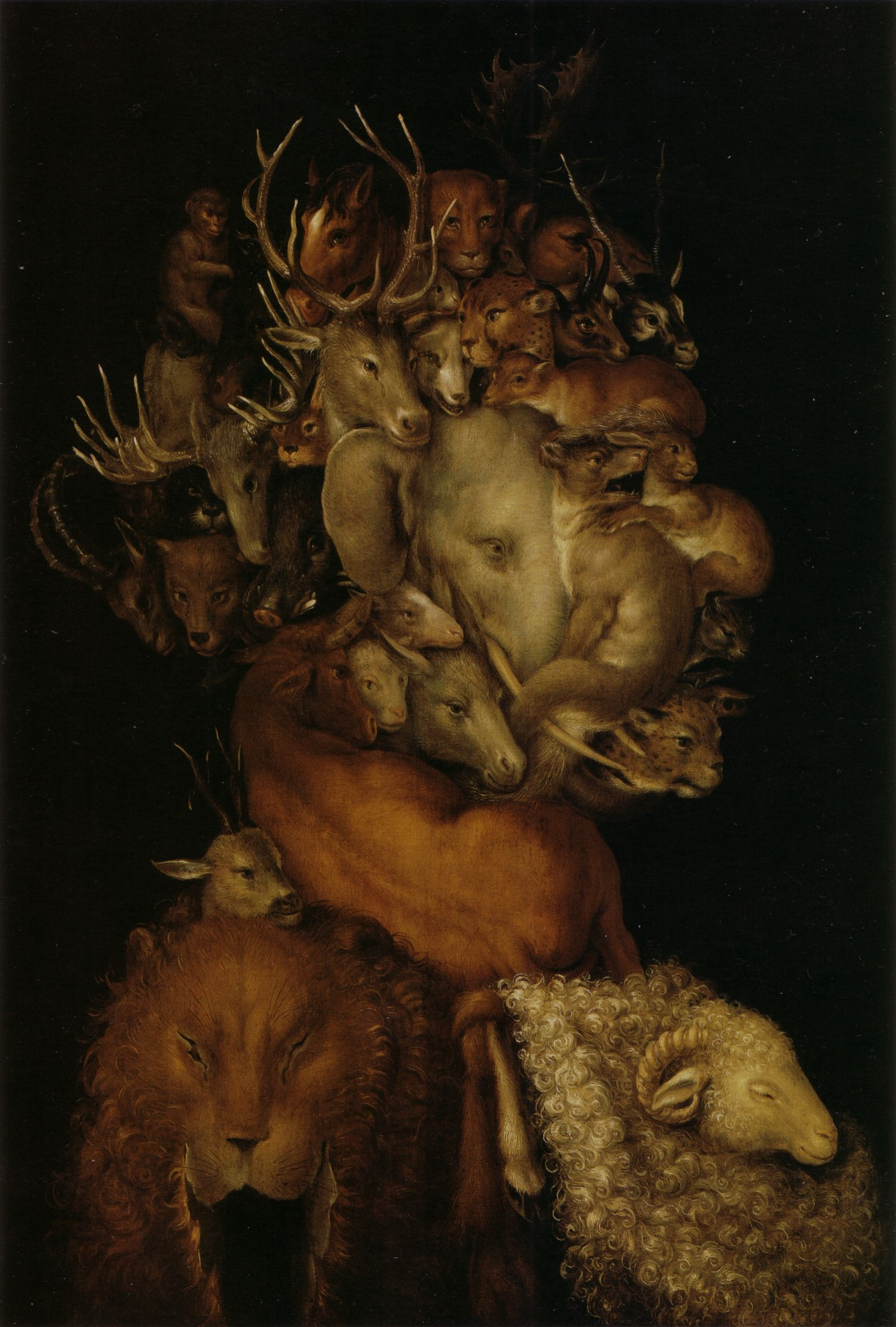
Earth, possibly 1566, private collection, Austria

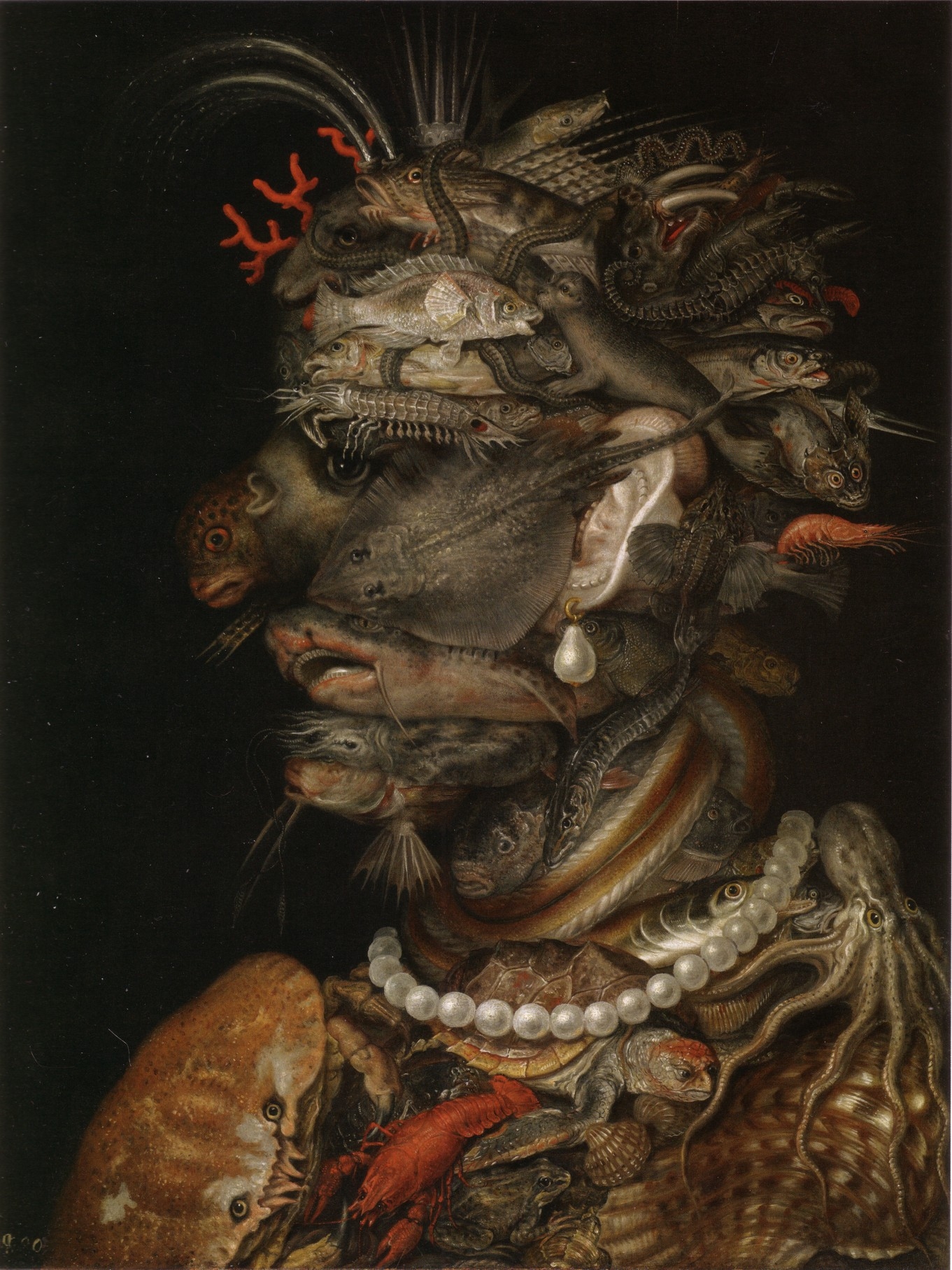
Water, 1566, Kunsthistorisches Museum Vienna

== Historical background ==
After training in Milan, Arcimboldo became the court painter for the Habsburgs, to Ferdinand I at the court in Vienna and later, to Maximilian II and his son Rudolf II at the court in Prague. Giuseppe gained knowledge of exotic and local animals because at the time Prague was a cultural center and exotic creatures such as the lion and elephant were brought there from all over the world.

== Description ==
Air displays a cornucopia of small birds that combine to create a slender male face. The majority of the birds are only partially visible which allow the artist to create the face and hair. The body is formed by a peacock; the goatee is a tail of a pheasant, and a duck forms the eyelids. The eagle and peacock are references to the Habsburg dynasty. Giuseppe included this reference to please his patrons and form a permanent bond between the painting and the Habsburgs.

Unlike the others, Fire is formed from inanimate objects. Flint and steel form the nose and ear. Burning wood creates a crown of glowing hair. Arcimboldo uses guns to create the main part of the body. Fire has the most references to the Habsburg dynasty. The Order of the Golden Fleece hangs in front of the body, which is a reference to the most important knightly order of the time. The double headed eagle, a symbol of the Holy Roman Empire, sits proudly on the torso. The two large cannons refer to the strength of the Habsburg armies in their ongoing war with the Turks.

Earth is perhaps the most skilfully blended piece the land animals curving together to create a strong, thick face. Antlered creatures surround the head, forming a crown. An elephant creates the cheek and ear while a wolf eating a mouse forms the eyelid and pupil. A full cow represents the neck. Like its siblings, the lion and the fleece are references to the Habsburg dynasty.

Water features the most realistic depictions. A chaotic mess of sea creatures create a woman's face. Her breast plate is a crab, turtle and lobster along with an octopus on her shoulder. The animals that make up her head are obscure but a clear crown is formed by the spines on the back of a fish and long pieces of coral. Almost seeming out of place, a pearl necklace lies across her neck framing her face and completing the pattern of order from confusion. She also wears a pearl earring.

This series is analogous to another of Arcimboldo's sets called The Four Seasons. Both series have the same number of pieces, and logically correspond to each other; Air to Spring, Fire to Summer, Earth to Autumn and Water to Winter. This pairing creates linked themes of chaos brought into harmony and the glorification of the Habsburg dynasty.

== See also ==
- 100 Great Paintings, 1980 BBC series
