= Stephen Marshall (writer) =

Canadian writer, film director, and internet entrepreneur

Stephen Marshall is a writer, film director, and internet entrepreneur from Canada. His work has been wide-ranging, including music videos, short format work, feature-length documentary, and political criticism. He is the nephew of singer and poet Ian Stephens, who died of AIDS related causes in 1996.

== Channel Zero ==
In 1995, Marshall founded Channel Zero, the world's first global VHS newsmagazine. The program was critically acclaimed and distributed through Tower Records, HMV and Virgin Megastores. After founding the program, Marshall consulted CNN Chairman Tom Johnson on the creation of a youth-based global news network.

== Guerrilla News Network ==
In 2000, Marshall co-founded the Guerrilla News Network, Inc. (GNN), a news web site and production company that seeks to "expose people to important global issues through cross-platform guerrilla programming." GNN produces original articles and republishes commentary and news from a number of sources. GNN also hosts blogs and discussion forums for registered users and produces feature documentaries, books and music videos.

== Film and video ==
Marshall has produced directed a wide array of content for television, film, and the internet. In conjunction with GNN, Marshall directed more than 15 NewsVideos, including the Sundance Award-winning, Crack the CIA. He also directed controversial music videos for Ad-Rock (of the Beastie Boys), Eminem and 50 Cent.

Marshall's feature documentary, BattleGround: 21 Days on the Empire's Edge, won the Silver Hugo for Best Documentary at the 2004 Chicago International Film Festival and was acquired by the Showtime Network and HomeVision for television and home video respectively. This Revolution, his first narrative feature starring Rosario Dawson, premiered at Sundance 2005, was acquired by Screen Media/Universal and the Sundance Channel for home video and broadcast, respectively.

His final documentary feature with revolutiontheory, Holy Wars was edited by Dan Swietlik (An Inconvenient Truth, Sicko), produced with Smuggler and completed in 2010. The critically acclaimed film was selected for competition at some of the world's most prestigious festivals, including AFI/Discovery Silverdocs and IDFA. Variety's Justin Chang wrote, "Marshall's cool, agnostic approach effectively modulates the intense battle of wills that develops between the uniquely compelling subjects." Moviefone chose it as "one of the best documentaries of 2010." The film was produced in association with Smuggler. It made Oscar-qualifying runs in New York and Los Angeles but failed to make the cut.

== Books ==
Marshall's first book, True Lies, was published in October 2004 by Penguin/Plume and is a collaboration with GNN co-founders Anthony Lappe and Ian Inaba. In May 2007, Disinformation published Marshall's second non-fiction book, Wolves in Sheep's Clothing.

== Music Blog ==
In March 2011, Marshall launched his music blog, "the list". The project originated from an email list of friends who received new music each week. Once the list grew past a few hundred, Marshall decided to create a website with the help of designer Josh Sibelman.

== ORA Systems ==
In 2012, Marshall moved from content creation to tech. He developed a data visualization platform (ORA) that is productized as an interactive data management, navigation, and optimization system for B2B and B2C applications. In 2014, "ORA Systems" was selected for the first class of the new SF-based Big Data fund/accelerator, "Data Elite".

== See also ==
- Guerrilla News Network
- Ian Inaba
