= Guerrilla News Network =

American defunct news website and television production company

Guerrilla News Network, Inc.
- Company type: Privately owned
- Founded: 2000
- Founder: Josh Shore; Stephen Marshall
- Defunct: 2009
- Fate: Shut down website domain later occupied by spam
- Headquarters: New York City, U.S.
- Area served: Worldwide (via internet)
- Key people: Josh Shore (Co-founder); Stephen Marshall (Co-founder)
- Products: Original articles, investigative reports, multimedia content, feature documentaries, books, music videos
- Services: News website, television production, user-driven content platform (blogs, forums, citizen journalism)

Guerrilla News Network, Inc. (GNN) was a privately owned news website and television production company that operated from 2000 to 2009. It declared as its mission to "expose people to important global issues through cross-platform guerrilla programming." This was accomplished through the production of original articles, reporting and multimedia, as well as republishing of commentary and news articles from a number of sources including other progressive commentary sites, mainstream news agencies, and blogs. GNN also hosted blogs for registered users, a discussion forum, featured collaborative user-driven investigations and user-submitted photo- and video journalism. The company also produced feature documentaries, books and music videos.

== History ==
GNN was founded in 2000 by Josh Shore and Stephen Marshall. Their headquarters were in New York City and they had production facilities in Berkeley, California. GNN produced a series of award-winning short web films about such subjects as the CIA's involvement in the drug trade during the 1980s and genetically engineered foods. They also produced two feature documentaries, numerous music videos, and a book. GNN's website, GNN.tv, was user driven; users/contributors receive a free blog page. GNN allowed submissions of original content in the form of articles. These had to be wholly original, sourced, and accompanied by a photograph or illustration. GNN published submissions based on a voting system, where users/contributors who have had more publications on GNN have more voting weight. Submissions with enough votes were published to the front page, while everything else remained on its creator's page until getting enough points. GNN also published headlines. The site was shut down in 2009, and the domain has since been occupied by a spam website.

== See also ==
- The Real News Network
- Adbusters
- Shooting War
