= Hans Thoma =

German painter and graphic artist (1839–1924)

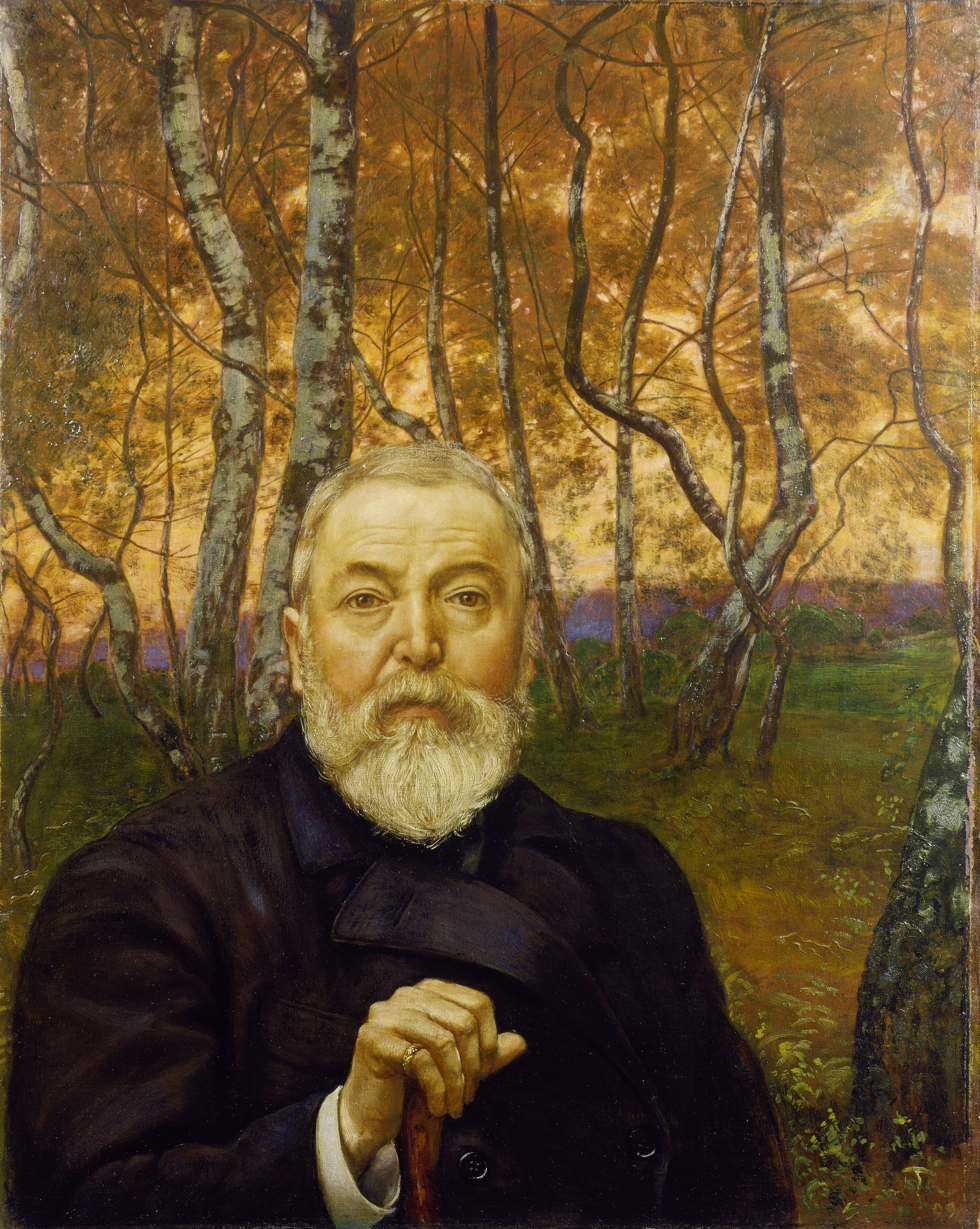
- Self portrait 1899 (Selbstbildnis vor einem Birkenwald)
- Born: 2 October 1839; Bernau im Schwarzwald, Grand Duchy of Baden
- Died: 7 November 1924 (aged 85); Karlsruhe, Weimar Republic
- Education: State Academy of Fine Arts Karlsruhe
- Occupations: Painter, printmaker, graphic artist, visual artist
- Spouse: Cella Thoma

Signature
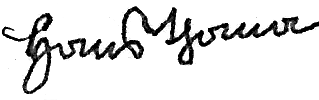

Hans Thoma (2 October 1839 – 7 November 1924) was a German painter. An alumnus and later professor of Karlsruhe Academy, he is known for his landscapes, portraits, and symbolic works rooted in German regional life and tradition. In his senior years, he served as a member of the Baden State Parliament.

After his death his work was appropriated by nationalist and Nazi ideology, and several of his artworks were looted from Jewish collectors during the Third Reich. Ongoing debates address his political views and alleged antisemitism.

== Biography ==
Hans Thoma was born on 2 October 1839 in Bernau, Grand Duchy of Baden in the Black Forest, Germany. He was the son of Franz Joseph Thoma (b. 1794, d. 1855), a miller, and Rosa Thoma (née Mayer, b. 1804, d. 1897), who came from a family of artisans. Her grandfather, native of Menzenschwand, was the great-uncle of Franz Xaver Winterhalter and Hermann Winterhalter.

=== Education ===
Thoma was trained in the basics of painting by a painter of clock faces. He took on two apprenticeships, first as a lithographer and house painter in Basel, then as a clock face painter in Furtwangen, but did not complete either of them. After pursuing self-taught studies in painting and drawing, he entered the Grand Duchy's art school Karlsruhe Academy in 1859. He studied under Johann Wilhelm Schirmer and Ludwig des Coudres, among others. Des Coudres had a major influence on his career. Thoma also studied under Hans Gude, but rebelled against Gude's realism. He completed his studies in 1866.

=== Years of wandering ===
After stints in Basel and Düsseldorf (1867–1868), Thoma traveled to Paris in 1868 with Otto Scholderer. There, he was particularly impressed by the works of Gustave Courbet and the Barbizon School. Thoma then moved to Munich, arguably the art capital of Germany at the time, where he lived from 1870 to 1876. In 1874, he traveled to Italy for the first time. At one point, he moved to Frankfurt.

In 1877, Thoma married the flower and still-life painter Cella Berteneder. He traveled to England in 1879 and was scheduled to exhibit at the Art Club Liverpool in 1884. A second trip to Italy followed in 1880. Thoma was friends with Arnold Böcklin and was closely associated with the Leibl Circle.

His reputation became firmly established following the exhibition of some thirty of his paintings at the Munich Art Society in 1890.

=== Frankfurt and Kronberg ===
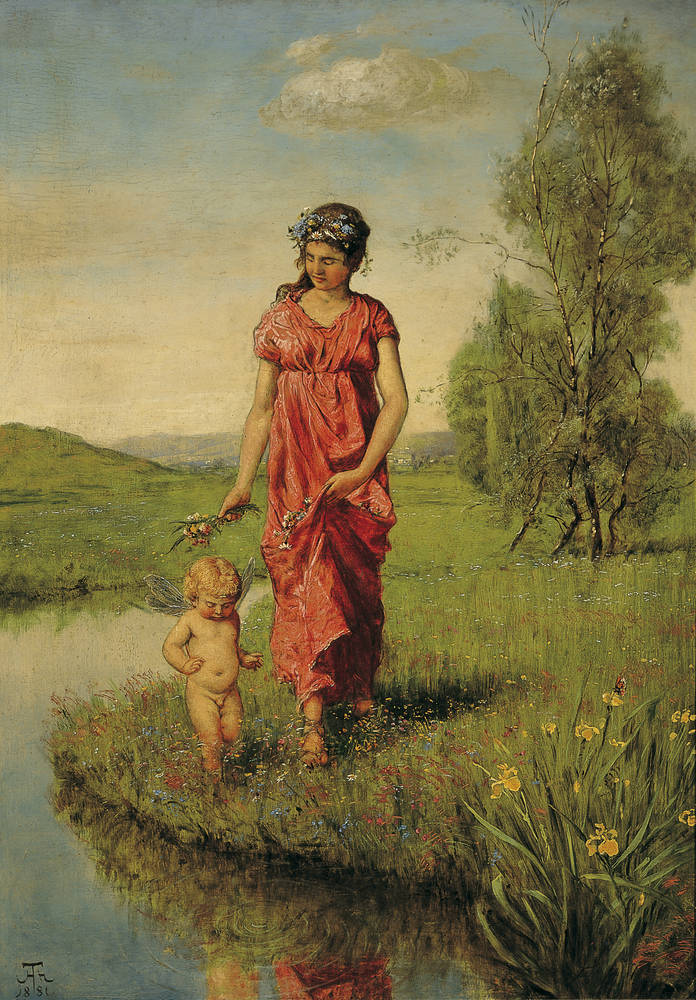
Flora mit Putto am Wasser, mythological painting, oil on canvas, 1881. Von der Heydt Museum

From 1878, Thoma lived in the West End of Frankfurt, in a house adjacent to the painter Wilhelm Steinhausen, sharing a household with his wife, his sister Agathe, and Ella, the adopted niece of his wife. At one point, he met Samuel Spier, a Marxist SDAP politician and scholar living nearby, as well as his wife, the writer and art critic Anna Spier. Both the Spiers as well as other friends of Steinhausen supported Thoma financially with commissions. Anna Spier wrote articles and a biographical book about him; Thoma created an ex libris and a portrait of her, which is now housed in the Germanisches Nationalmuseum in Nuremberg.

From 1886 to 1899, Thoma lived at 150 Wolfgangstrasse in Frankfurt, from 1896 to 1898, he resided in Oberursel at 20 Taunusstrasse (today Altkönigstr. 20). Inscriptions on both buildings attest to this. During this time, he also created a frieze with mythological scenes in the Palais Pringsheim in Munich. For a time he hosted the writer Julius Langbehn. The builder of his residence, Simon Ravenstein, commissioned several works from Thoma, the first of which being the painting of Ravenstein's house in 1882.

Thoma was closely associated with the painters of the Kronberg Artists' Colony. In 1899, he and his family moved to Kronberg, where they took up residence in a flat with a studio next to the Friedrichshof castle, a move Thoma regarded as a visible expression of his long-awaited recognition as a painter.

=== Karlsruhe ===
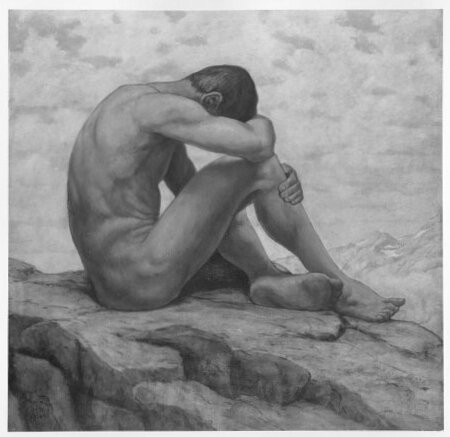
Bergeinsamkeit, 1899

In 1899, Thoma was appointed professor at the Karlsruhe Academy and director of the Karlsruhe Art Gallery, now the Staatliche Kunsthalle Karlsruhe. He held this position until 1920. During his tenure, he decorated the Thoma Chapel in the gallery, which is still open to the public today. In 1919, a new wing housing the Thoma Museum was opened to celebrate his 70th birthday.

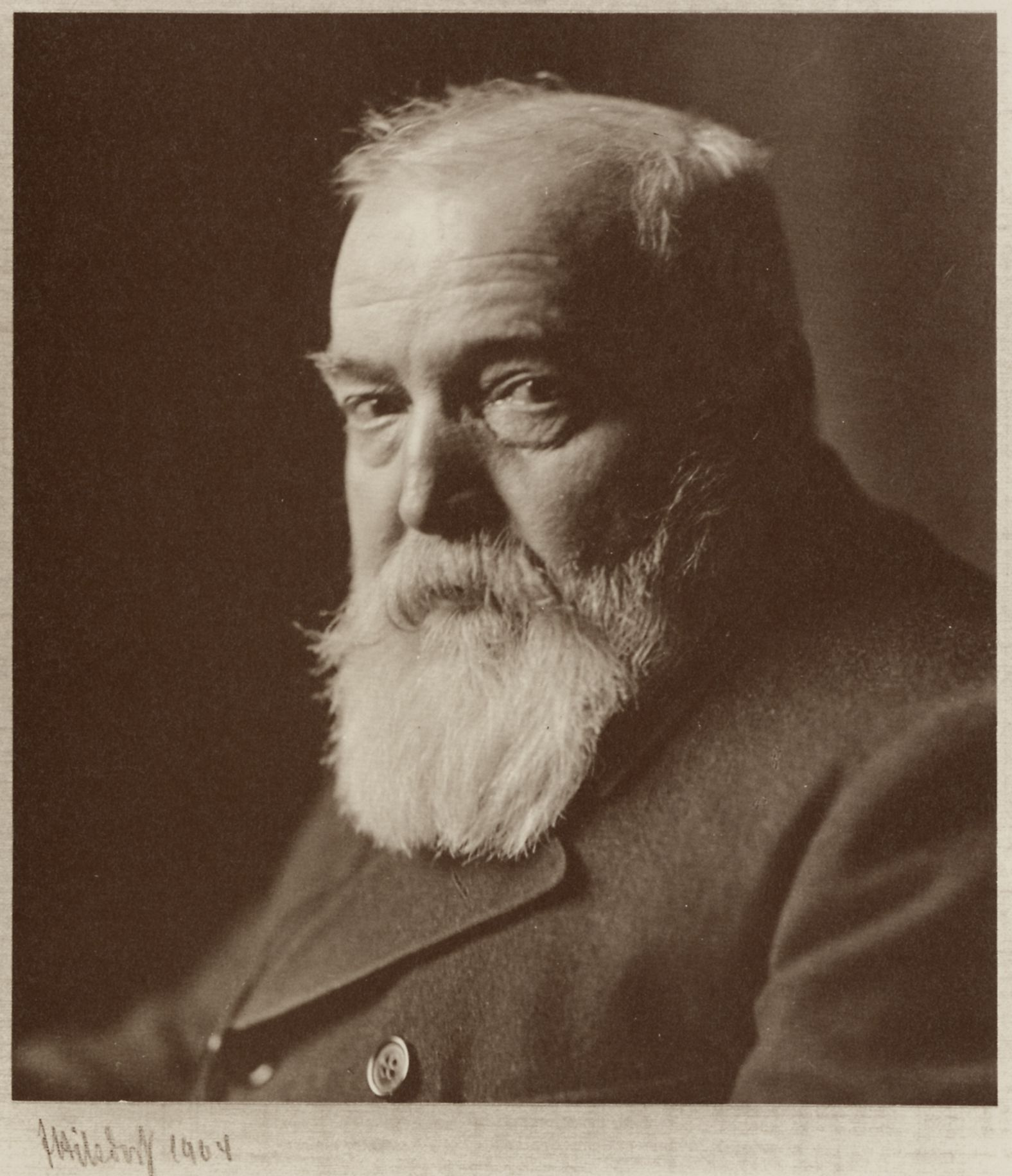
Hans Thoma (photo by Jacob Hilsdorf, 1904)

The Karlsruhe period was overshadowed by the death of his wife Cella in 1901, an event that deeply affected Thoma, leading to years of depression. In the following years, he continued to live in Karlsruhe with his sister.

By around 1910, he was regarded as one of Germany's most esteemed painters. The dictionary Meyer's Großes Konversations-Lexikon of 1909 described him as "one of the most beloved painters of the German people", a designation again invoked in 2013 by the Städel Museum in Frankfurt during the exhibition Hans Thoma: "Favorite Painter of the German People".

From 1905 to 1918, Thoma served as a member of the First Chamber of the Baden State Parliament, having been appointed by the Grand Duke. In October 1914, he was among the signatories of the Manifesto of the 93, which sought to defend German militarism at the beginning of World War I and denied the occurrence of war crimes in Belgium.

In 1919, Thoma's 80th birthday was celebrated at an event organised by Ernst Oppler and Lovis Corinth.

Hans Thoma died in Karlsruhe in 1924 at the age of 85.

== Style and legacy ==
In spite of his studies under various masters, his art has little in common with modern ideas, and is formed partly by his early impressions of the simple idyllic life of his native district, partly by his sympathy with the early German masters, particularly with Albrecht Altdorfer and Lucas Cranach the Elder. In his love of the details of nature, in his precise drawing of outline, and in his predilection for local coloring, he has distinct affinities with the Pre-Raphaelites.

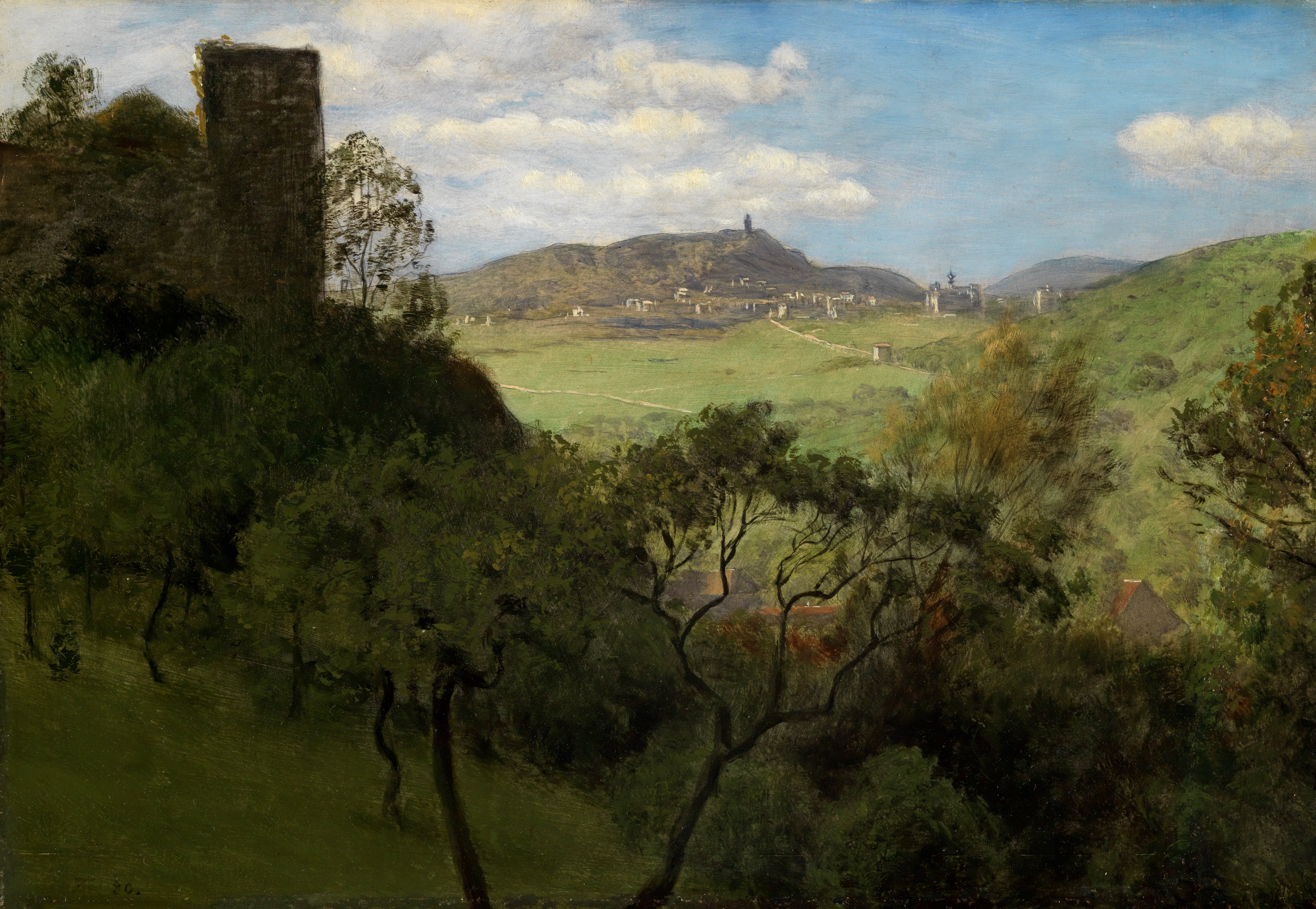
Blick auf Falkenstein im Taunus, oil on paperboard, 1880. Kunsthalle Karlsruhe

=== Artistic development ===
Thoma's early works are characterized by a lyrical pantheism. During his time in Munich, he primarily focused on painting landscapes. In Frankfurt, however, his work was centered around pieces with narrative or allegorical content. In his later years, he worked intensively on his Thoma Chapel, decorating it with scenes from the life and deeds of Jesus Christ.

Today, his best and most authentic works are considered to be his landscapes, such as those depicting the Black Forest, the Upper Rhine Plain, and the Taunus, as well as portraits of his friends, family, and himself. On the other hand, his grotesquely overdrawn, realistic, and mythological-religious depictions, which were strongly influenced by Arnold Böcklin, are less compelling to contemporary audiences.

Thoma was among the preferred selection of contemporary artists in a committee for the procurement and evaluation of Stollwerck pictures recommended to the Cologne chocolate manufacturer Ludwig Stollwerck to commission for design proposals.

=== Cultural and historical impact ===
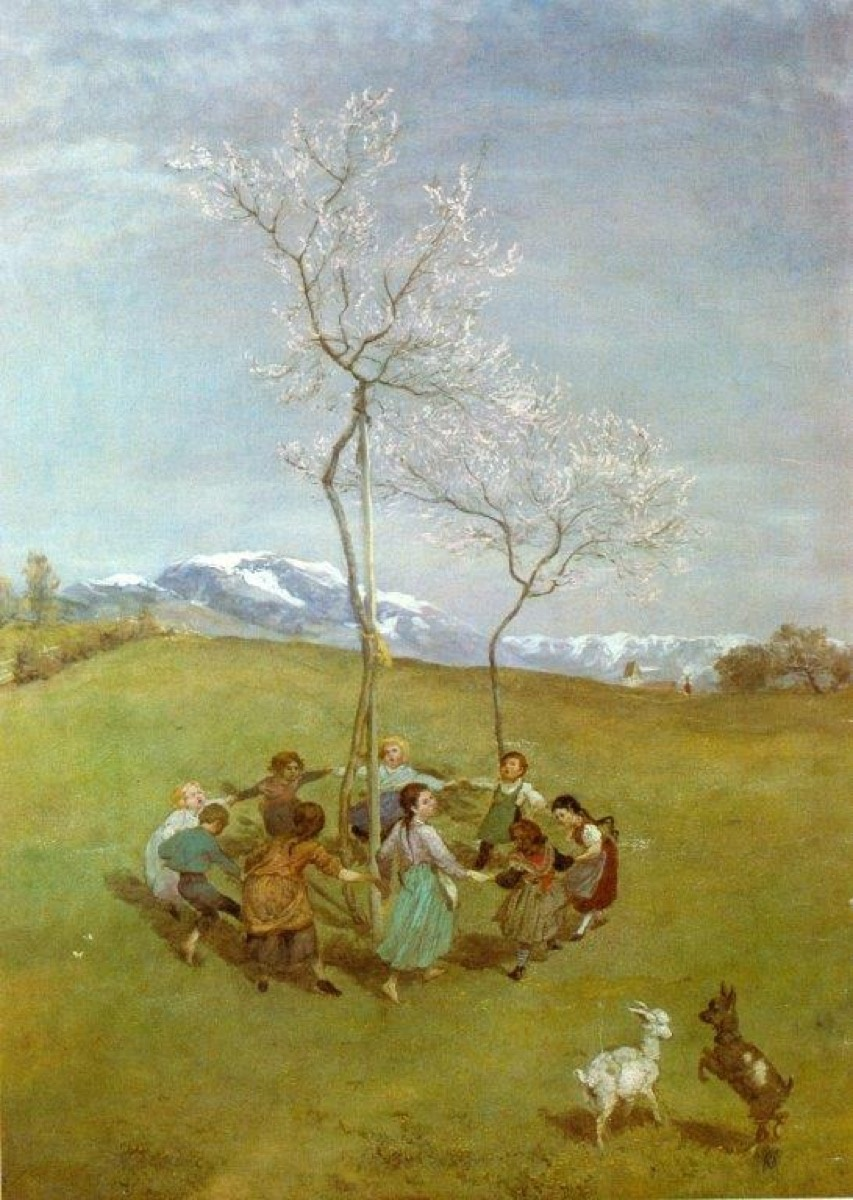
Spring in the mountains / Children dancing in a ring

The art historian Henry Thode elevated Thoma's work as a representation of national identity, which laid the groundwork for its appropriation by Nazi art ideology. Nationalist circles developed the school of Hans Thoma in Karlsruhe into a center for German-chauvinistic movements, antisemitism, anti-capitalism, and Heimatkunst ("homeland art"). Thoma's artwork was favored by the Nazis during the Third Reich 1933-1945 and he was listed among official painters. The Lost Art Database of Nazi looted art lists several paintings by Thoma. Artworks acquired for Adolf Hitler's planned Führermuseum in Linz included his Badende Jünglinge ("bathing lads"), looted from the Jewish collector Adolf Bensinger in 1939, and Blick auf Mamolsheim ("view of Mamolsheim"), looted from the Jewish collectors Martin and Florence Flersheim. Other artworks by Thoma that were acquired during the Nazi era from Jewish collectors include "Dusk at Lake Garda" looted from the Jewish collector Ottmar Strauss, "Springtime in the Mountains / Children's Dance," sold under duress in 1938 by Hedwig Ullmann, (Note: Purchased at auction by Rudolf August Oetker in 1954, included in the Dr. Oetker Collection, restituted to the Ullmann heirs in January 2017.) Sinnendes Mädchen / Frau mit Schimmel ("Pensive Girl / Women with White Horse") (Note: Lost Art-ID 302432) looted from the Jewish art collector Smoschewer in 1939 and The Rhine at Säckingen in the Black Forest formerly owned by Max Emden.

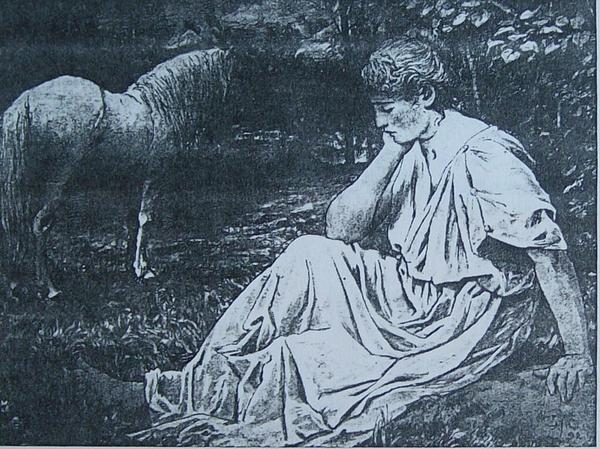
Sinnendes Mädchen / Frau mit Schimmel, drawing

A study on the history of the Hans Thoma Prize for fine arts ("Hans-Thoma-Preis für Bildende Kunst") published in 2022 showed that in his later years, Thoma moved in nationalist circles and made antisemitic statements himself. It was commissioned by a ministry of Baden-Wurttemberg, which awards the prize since 1950, to Dr. Frank Engehausen, professor at the University of Heidelberg.

In 2023, Hans Thoma Prize laureate Marcel van Eeden presented an exhibition titled 1898 which, based on various documents relating to Thoma's visit to a Rembrandt exhibition in Amsterdam, argues that Thoma was an active antisemite. This claim faced some opposition. According to the Art Gallery in Karlsruhe, the exhibition "massively violated standards of good academic practice". A public response followed. An extensive review of van Eeden's artist book 1898 by the art historian and curator Andreas Strobl concluded: "Van Eeden's reservations about Thoma are his own and reflect a critical stance toward historical contexts. However, constructing the image of a potentially wholly antisemitic artist from this impulse and presenting it as 'research results' fails to do justice to a critical engagement with Hans Thoma's oeuvre or with the antisemitism of his time. Such research, conducted in this manner, becomes a form of agitation."

In 2024, the Hans Thoma Prize was renamed. Reasons given were that Thoma "embodied a völkisch, anti-modern worldview", "took positions in favor of reactionary circles who opposed French influences in German art" and "expressed antisemitic views". This stood in contrast to the prize which "specifically honours innovative positions".

=== Influence ===
Among Thoma's students was Hermann Haas, later director of a ceramics school in Landshut.

There are artistic and biographical parallels between Thoma and the slightly younger Frankfurt-based artist Johann Georg Mohr.

Thoma's circle of friends and acquaintances included several prominent poets, writers, and magazine editors, such as Otto Julius Bierbaum. These individuals often gathered at Thoma's summer retreat in Finsterwalde at the Tegernsee. At least one drawing by Thoma exists of both Bierbaum and his wife Gemma.

== Works ==
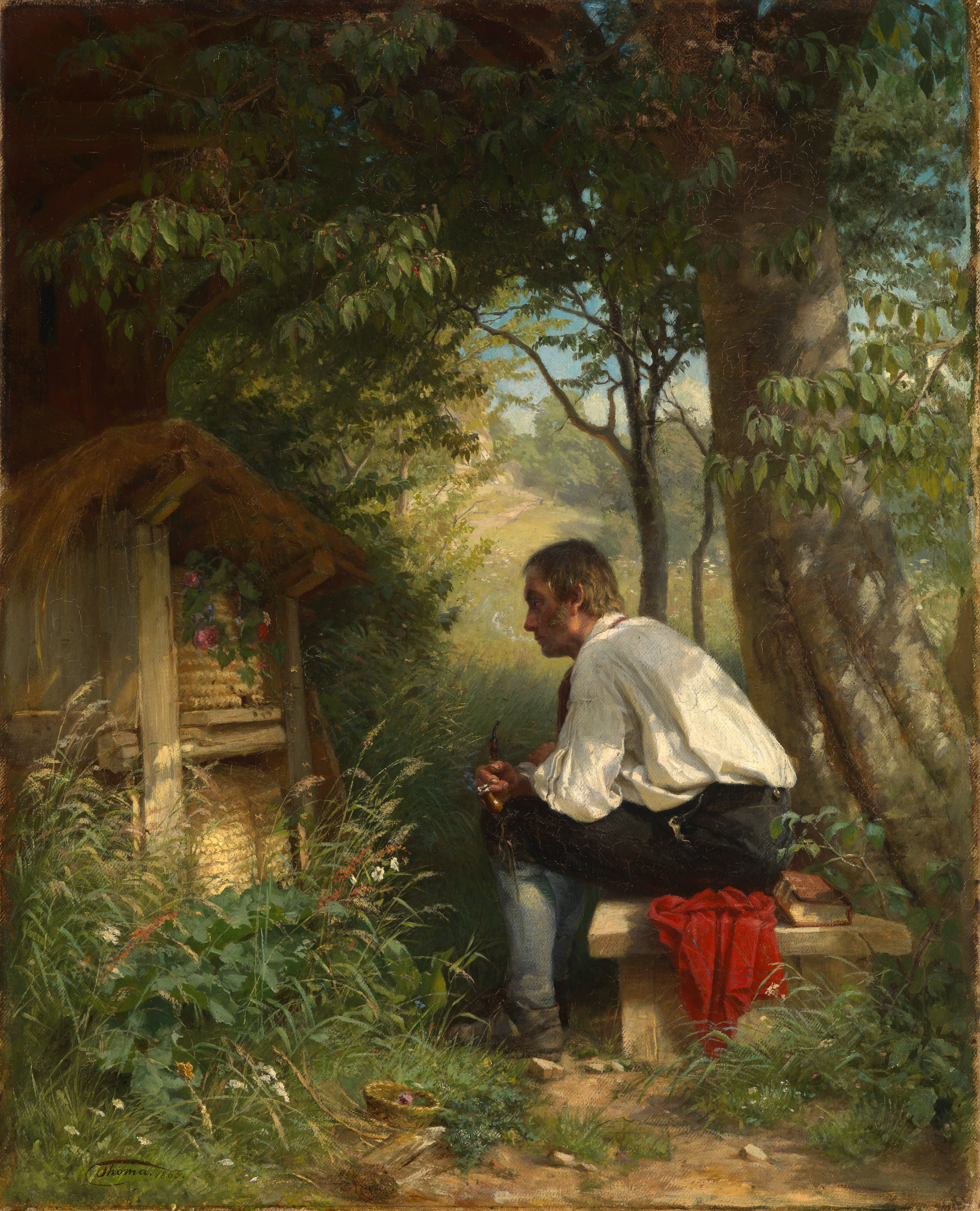
Der Bienenfreund, oil on canvas

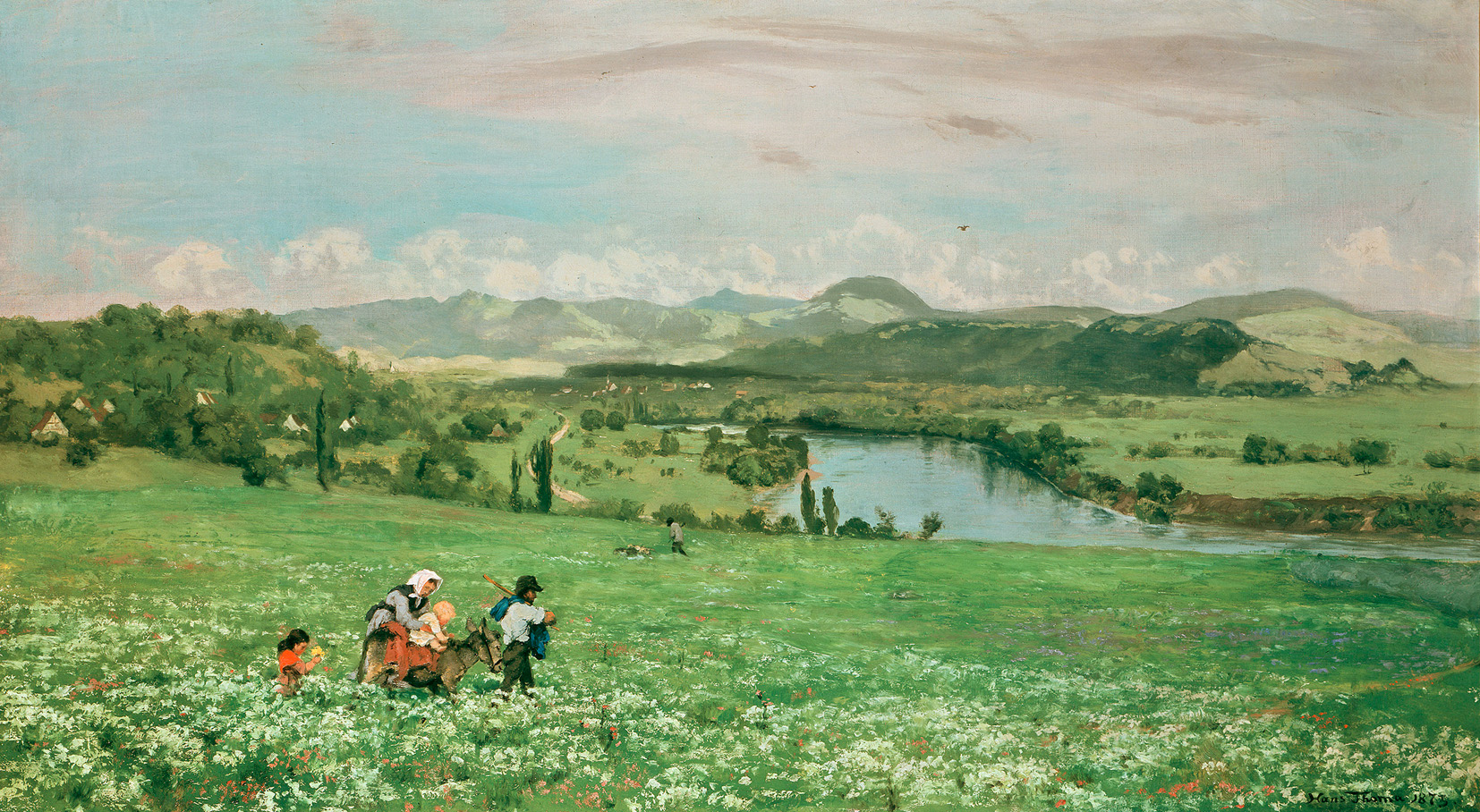
Der Rhein bei Säckingen, oil on canvas

=== Major works ===
- Der Bienenfreund, 1863, Kunsthalle Karlsruhe
- Schwarzwaldlandschaft, 1867, Kunsthalle Bremen
- Porträts der Mutter und Schwester, 1868, Museum Folkwang Essen
- Der Ziegenhirt, 1869, Landesmuseum Mainz
- Schwarzwaldlandschaft, 1872, Staatliche Museen Berlin
- Kinderreigen, 1872, Kunsthalle Karlsruhe
- Der Rhein bei Laufenburg, 1870, Alte Nationalgalerie
- Der Rhein bei Säckingen, 1873, Hans-Thoma-Museum Bernau
- Der Rhein bei Säckingen, 1873, Alte Nationalgalerie
- Gesang im Grünen, um 1875, Landesmuseum Hannover
- Religionsunterricht, 1878, pricate collection
- Zitronenverkäuferin, 1880, Sander collection
- Taunuslandschaften, 1881 and 1890, Neue Pinakothek
- Heuernte, 1883, Kurpfälzisches Museum
- Kinderreigen, 1884, private collection
- Der Kunstschriftsteller Conrad Fiedler, 1884, Alte Nationalgalerie
- Bogenschützen, 1887, Alte Nationalgalerie
- Der Angler, 1888, Städtische Kunstsammlungen Bonn
- Mondscheingeiger, 1890, private collection
- Einsamkeit, 1894, private collection
- Der Hüter des Tales, 1893, Galerie Neue Meister
- Tal bei Bernau, 1904, Hans-Thoma-Kunstmuseum Bernau
- Das wandernde Bächlein, 1906
- Series of twelve images of the months, eight of planets, and ten of Christ, 1906–1908, Kunsthalle Karlsruhe

=== Whereabouts ===
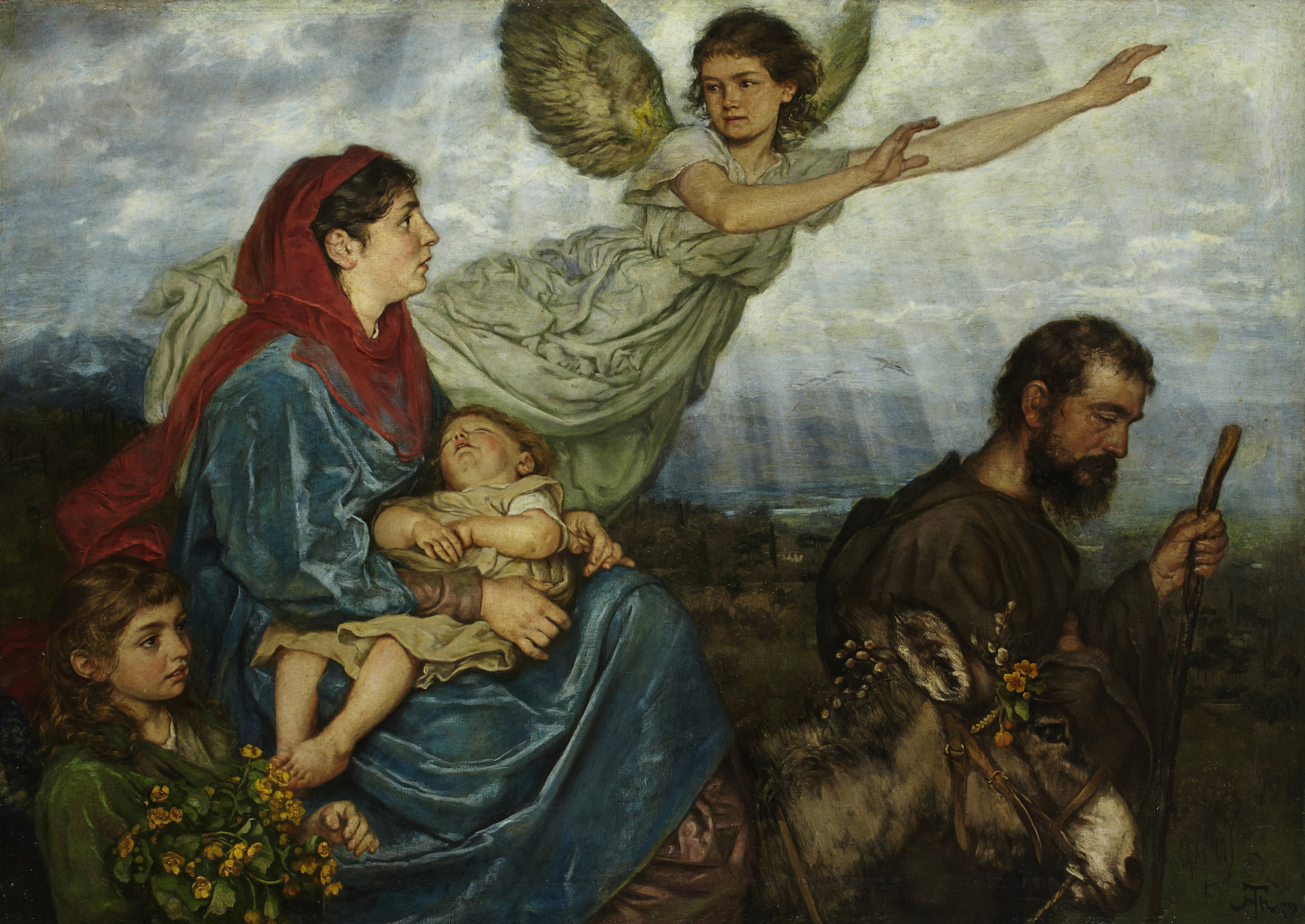
Die Flucht nach Ägypten, 1879

Important Thoma collections are owned by the Städel in Frankfurt and the Staatliche Kunsthalle in Karlsruhe. Many of his pictures have found their way into two private collections in Liverpool. A portrait of the artist and two subject pictures, The Guardian of the Valley and Spring Idyll are at the Galerie Neue Meister; Eve in Paradise and The Open Valley at the Städel. Other important pictures of his are Paradise, Christ and Nicodemus, The Flight into Egypt, Charon, Pietà, Adam and Eve, Solitude, Tritons, besides many landscapes and portraits.

He also produced numerous lithographs and pen drawings, and some decorative mural paintings, notably in a café at Frankfurt, and in the music room of the Alfred Pringsheim house in Munich.

=== Gallery ===
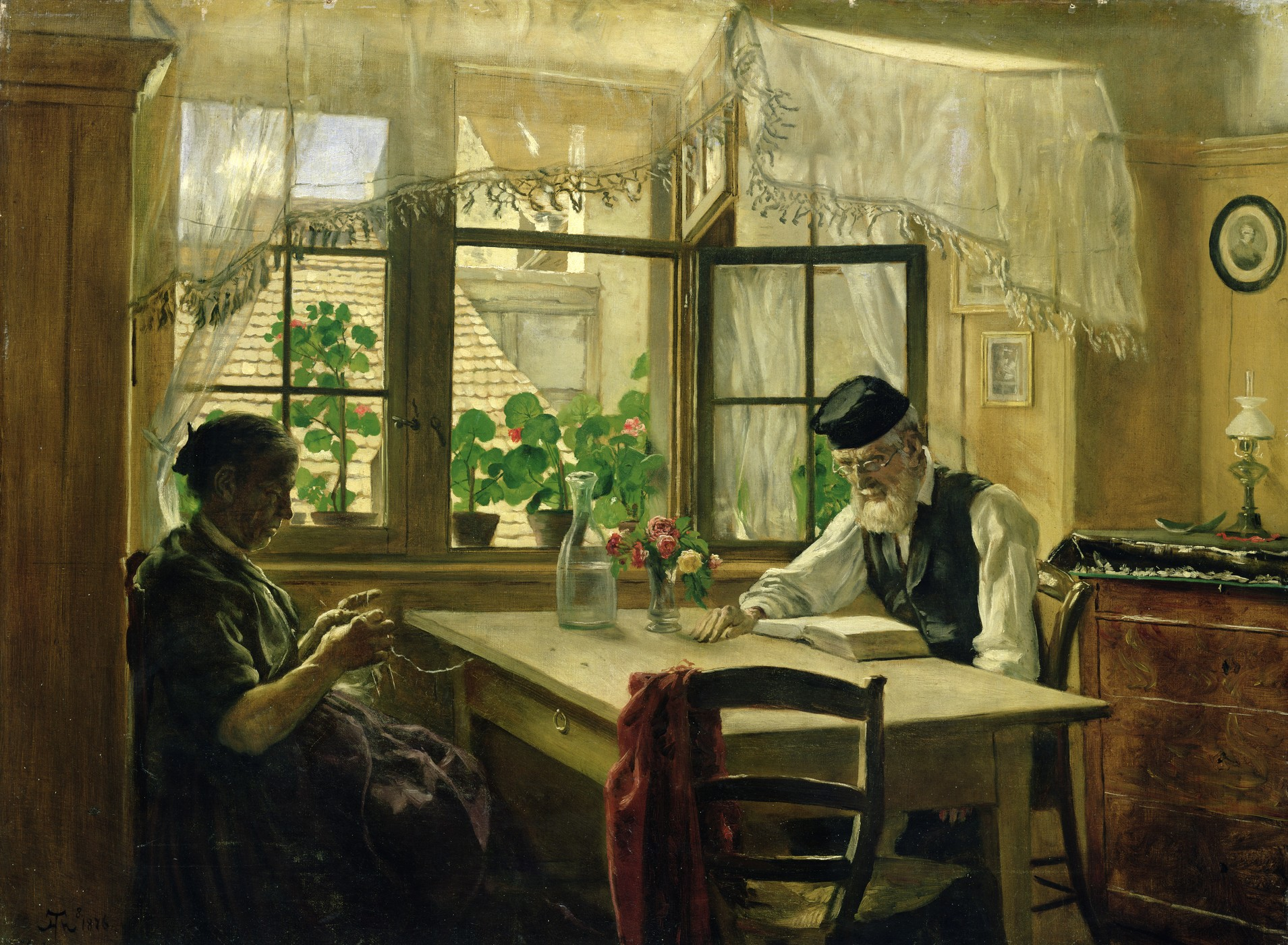
Sunday Peace

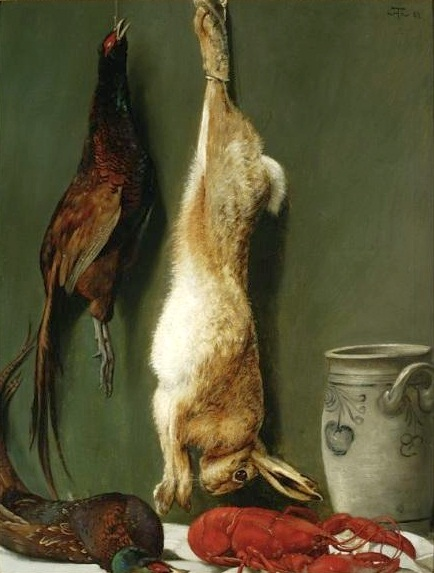
Still life with a hare, pheasants and a lobster

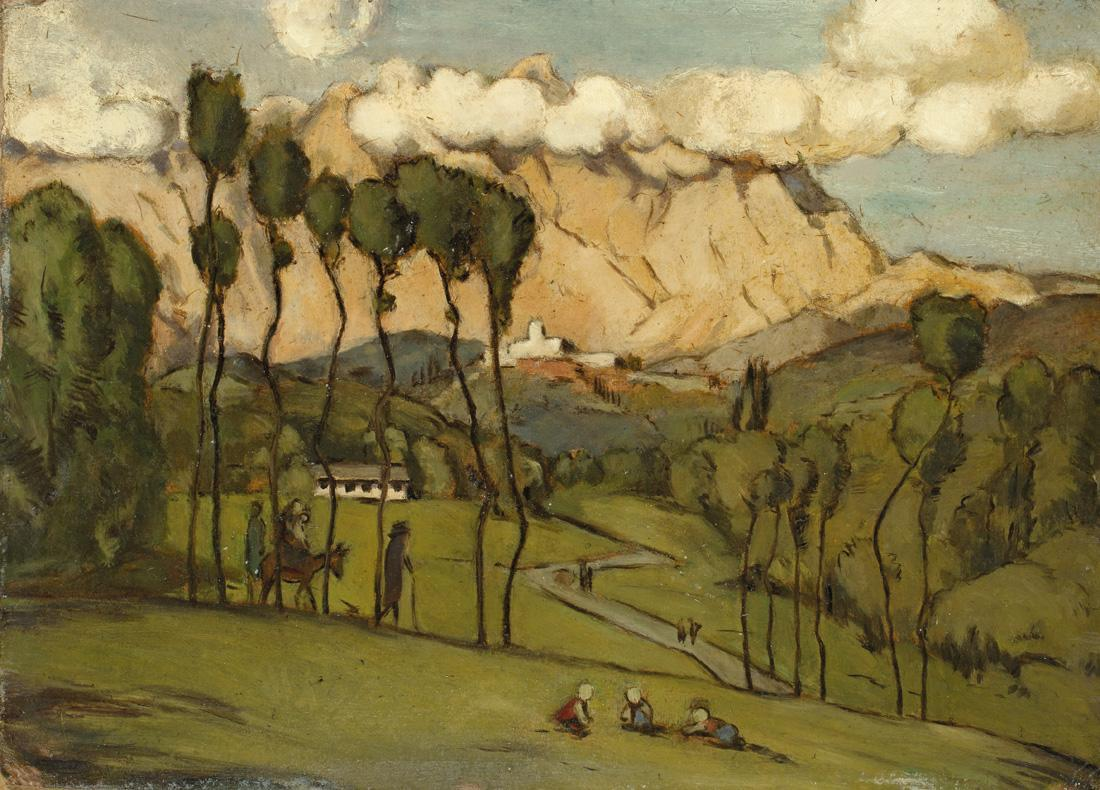
The Mountains of Carrara

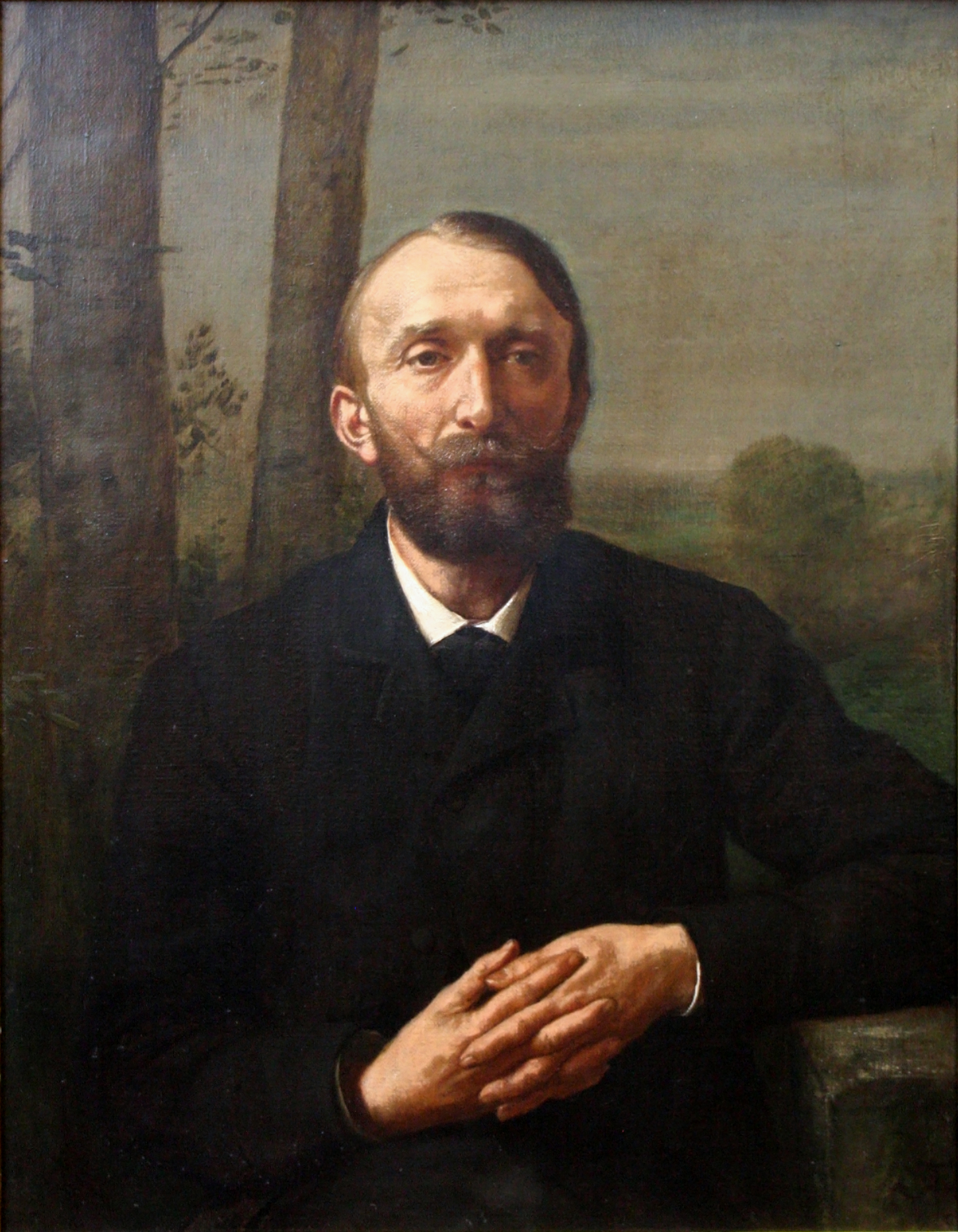
Portrait of Conrad Fiedler

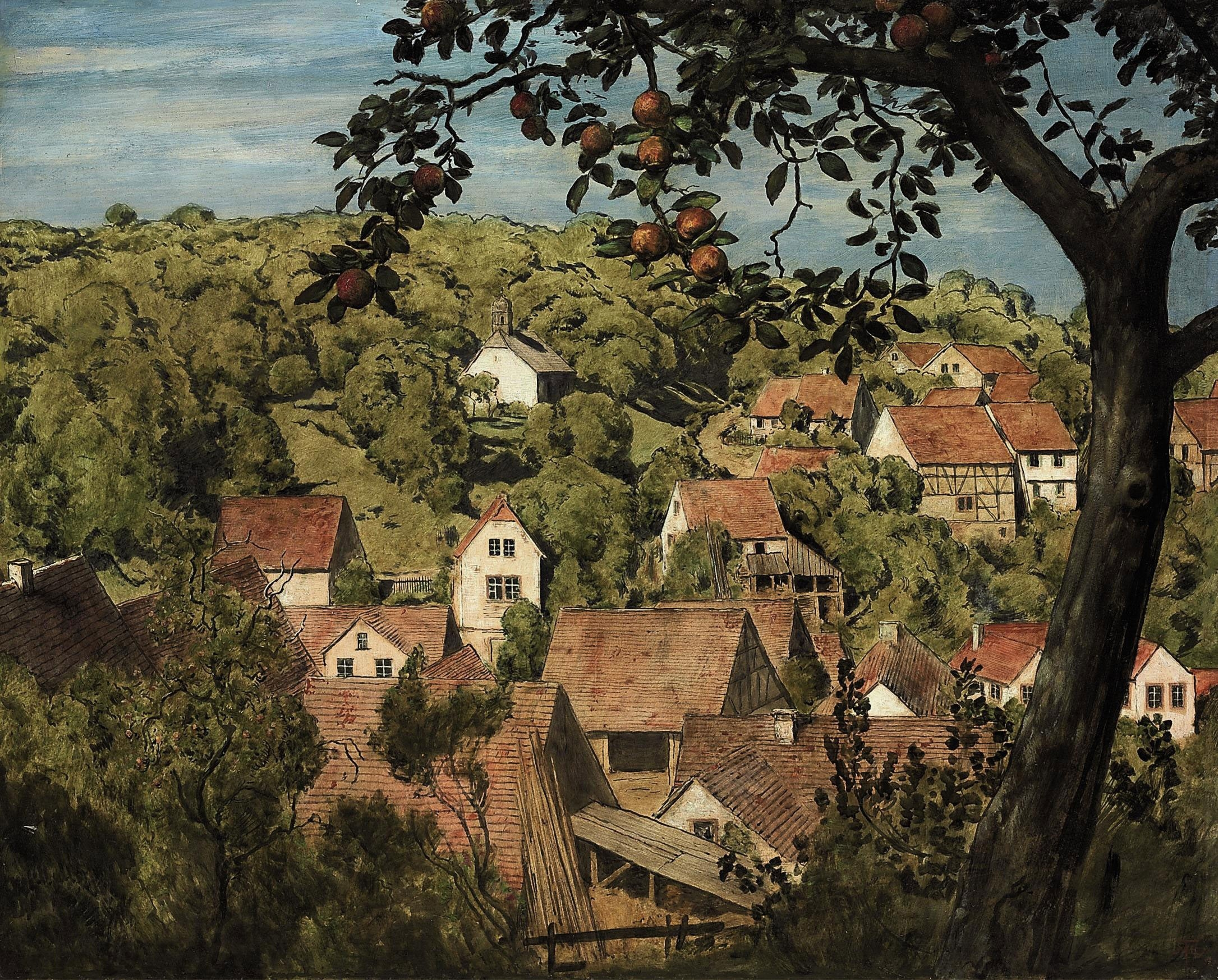
View of Mamolsheim

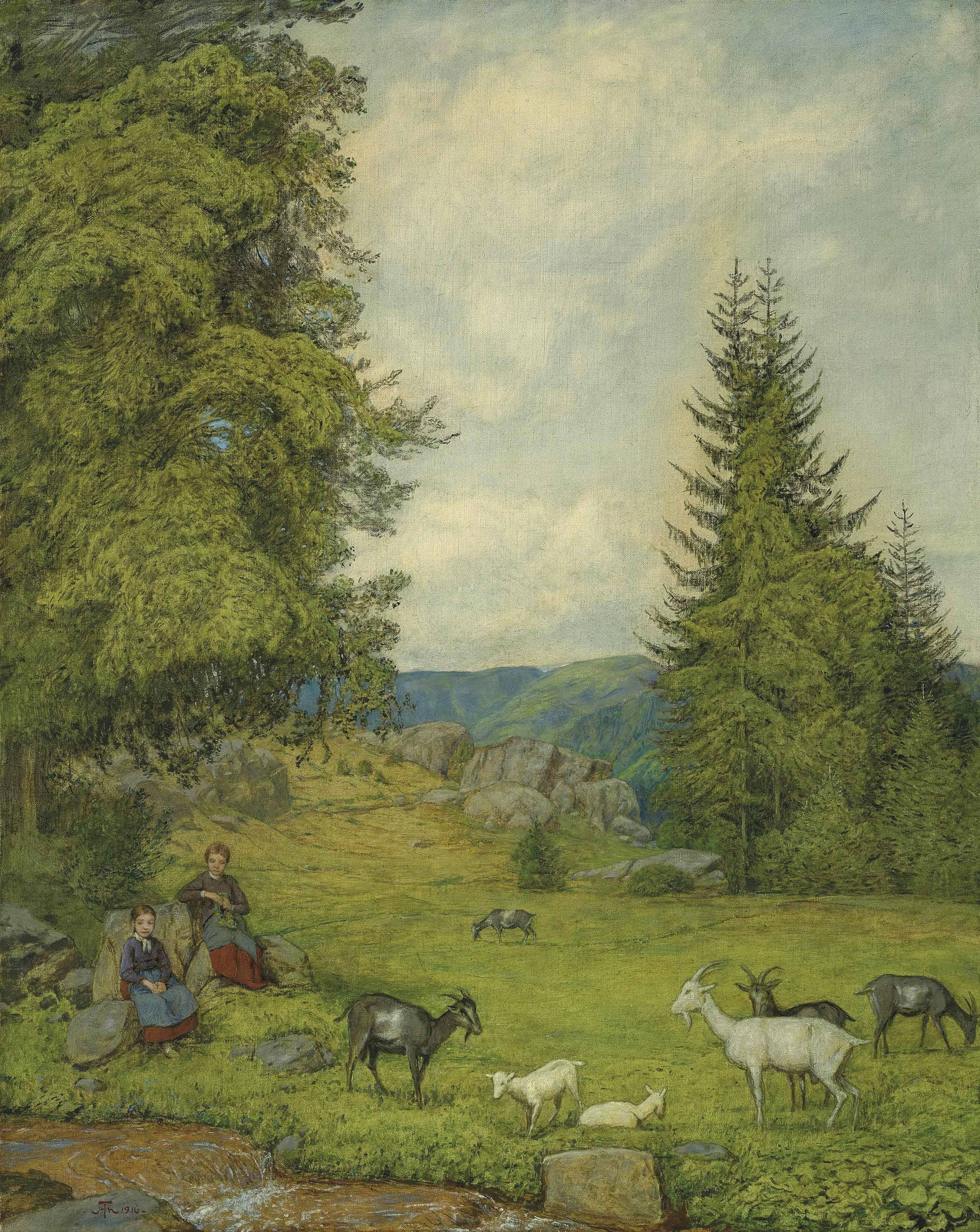
Children with a Herd of Goats

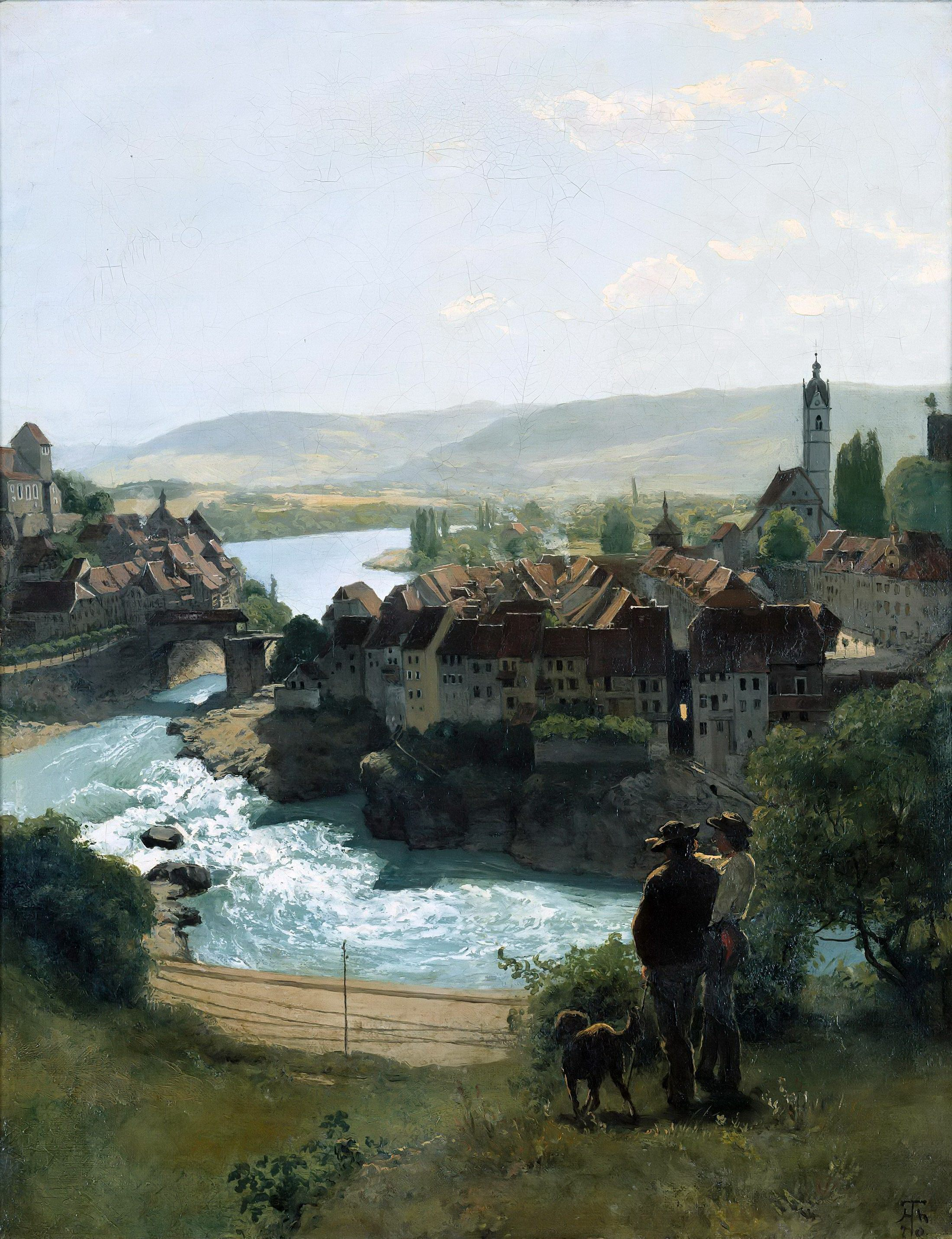
Der Rhein bei Laufenburg

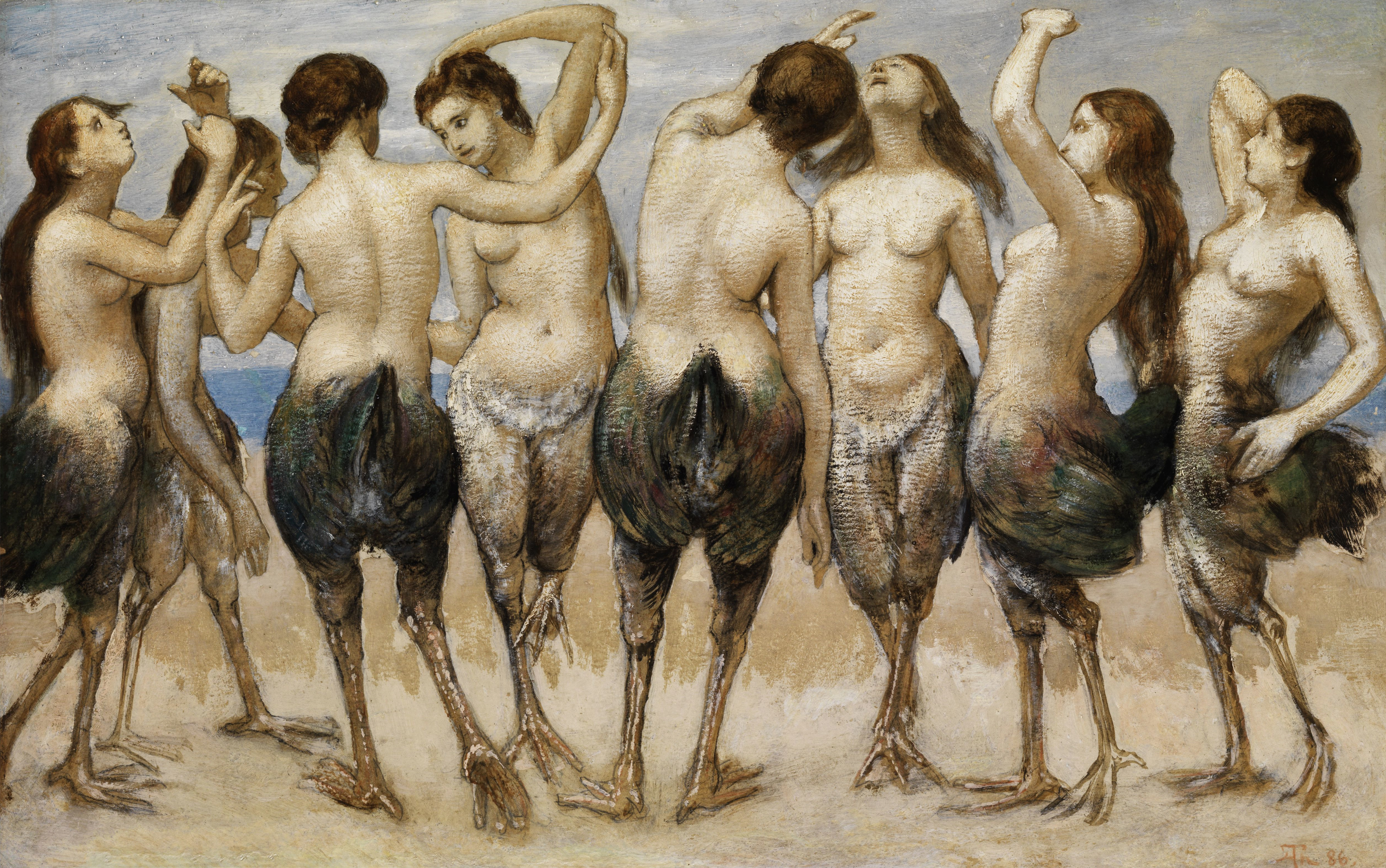
Eight Dancing Maidens in Bird Costumes

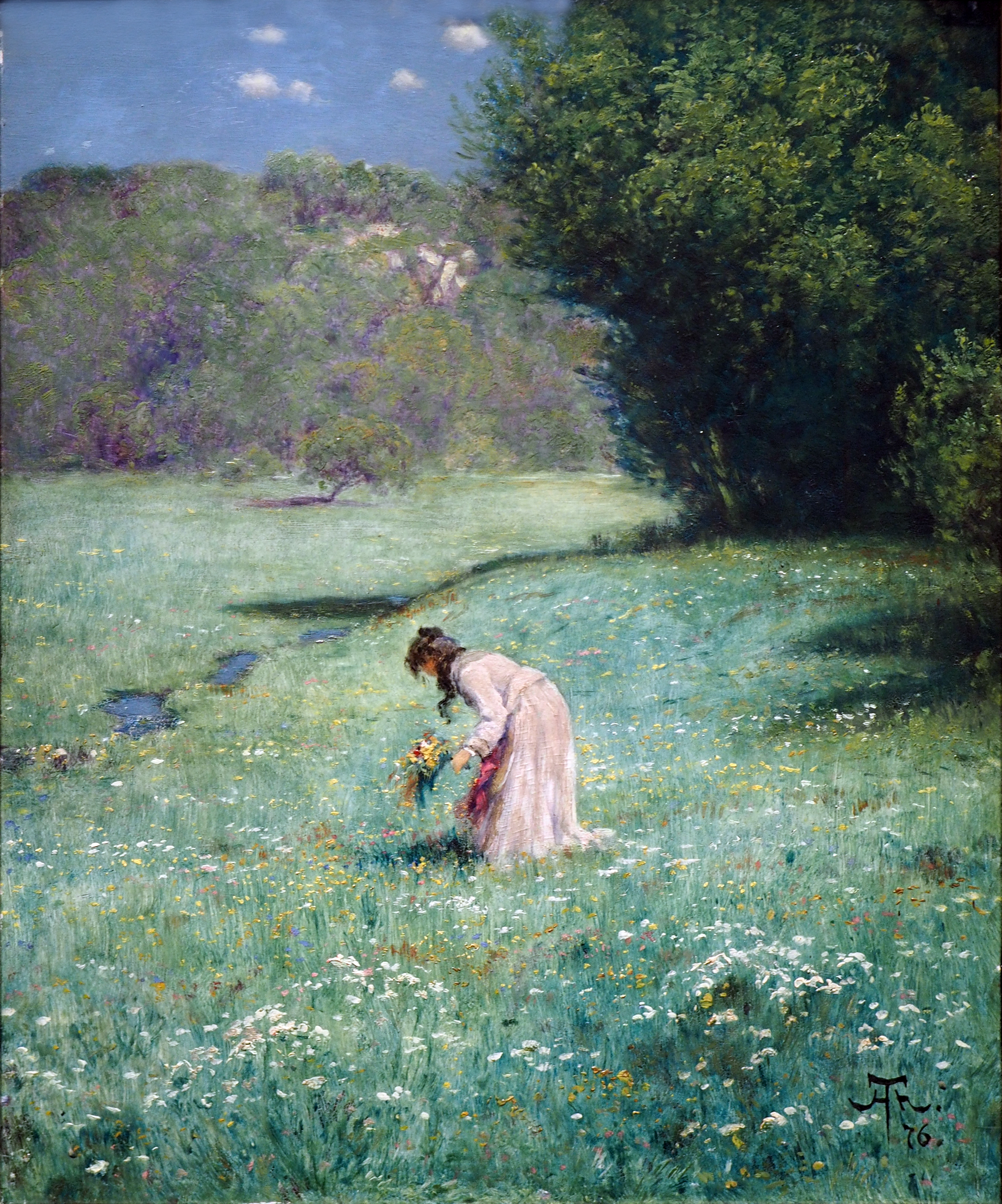
Auf einer Waldwiese (Note: Thoma's wife Cella stood as model.)

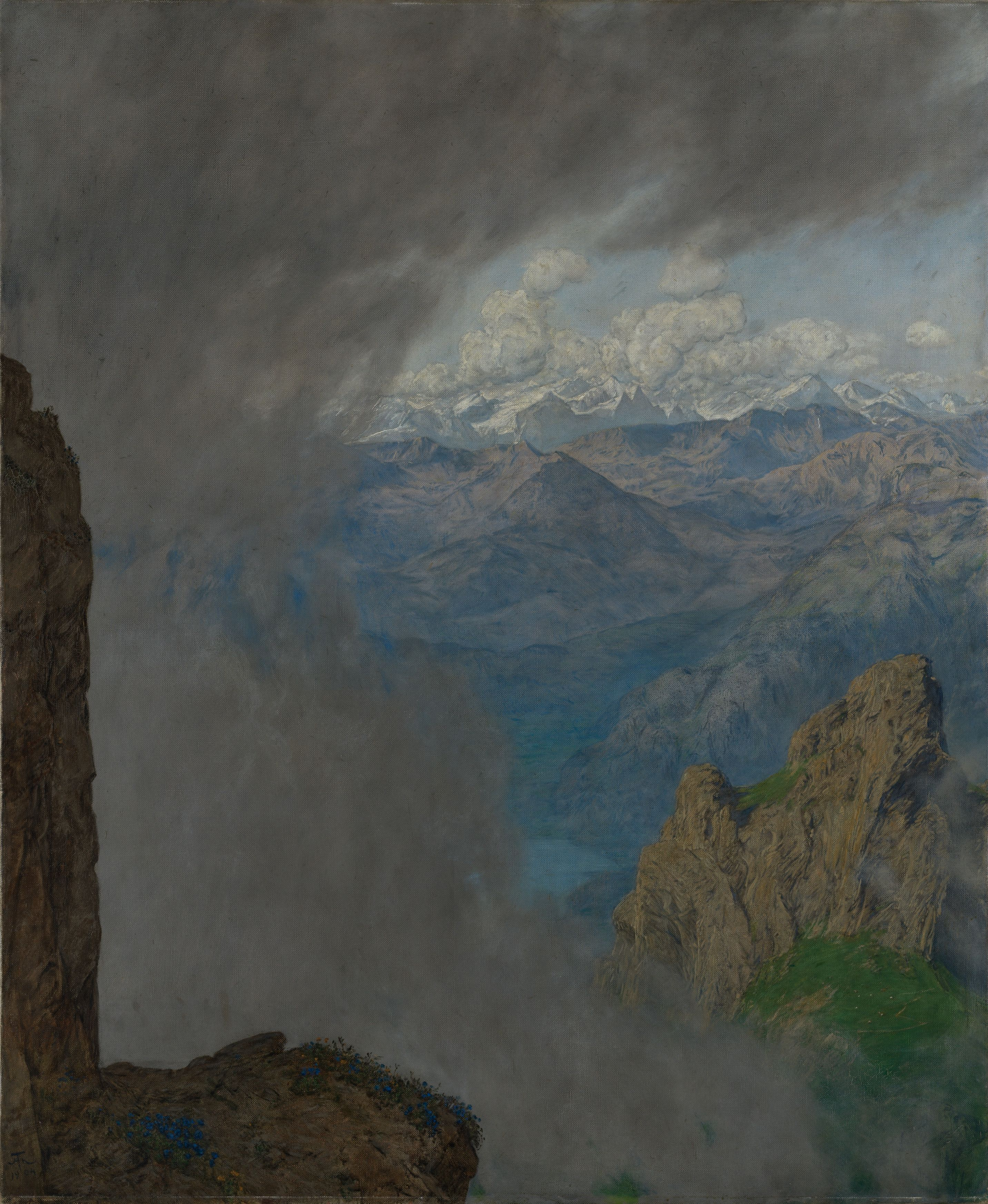
Blick vom Pilatus

== Publications ==
- The landscape painter. A coloring book for children. 1904
- Festival calendar by Hans Thoma. Published by E. A. Seemann, Leipzig. Portfolio with 31 coloured plates.
- In the autumn of life. Gesammelte Erinnerungsblätter. 1909
- In the winter of life. Memoirs. 1919
- Paths to Peace. 1919
- Yearbook of the Soul. 1922

== Exhibitions ==
=== Permanent ===
- In Bernau, the Hans-Thoma-Kunstmuseum founded by the mayor Ludwig Baur exhibits oil paintings, graphics, decorative arts and life documents.
- In Oberursel, the Hans Thoma memorial site in the Vortaunus Museum has works of Thoma on display.

=== Temporary ===
- 1920: Maler des Schwarzwaldes ("Painter of the Black Forest"). On the occasion of his 80th birthday. Colombischloessle, Freiburg.
- 1956: Deutsche Malerei seit Caspar David Friedrich – Ausgewählte Meister ("German painting since Caspar David Friedrich - Selected masters"). Volkswagen factory, Wolfsburg.
- 1974: Hans Thoma 1839 – 1924. Memorial exhibition on the occasion of the 50th anniversary of his death with graphic art from the collection of Julius Schwoerer. Cum exhibition catalogue. Augustiner Museum, Freiburg.
- 1989: Hans Thoma - Lebensbilder ("Hans Thoma - Portraits of life). Cum exhibition catalogue. Augustiner Museum, Freiburg.
- 2011: Hans Thoma im Gespräch ("In conversation with Hans Thoma"). Dreiländermuseum Lörrach.
- 2013: Hans Thoma. Lieblingsmaler des deutschen Volkes ("Hans Thoma. Favourite painter of the German people"). Cum exhibition catalogue. Städel, Frankfurt.
- 2014: Hans Thoma. Stationen eines Künstlerlebens ("Hans Thoma. Stations in an artist's life"). Hans-Thoma-Kunstmuseum, Bernau im Schwarzwald.
- 2018: Hans Thoma. Wanderer zwischen den Welten ("Hans Thoma. Wanderer between the worlds"). Cum exhibition catalogue. Museum LA8, Baden-Baden.
- 2024: Hans Thoma. Ein Maler als Museumsdirektor ("Hans Thoma. A painter as museum director"). Staatliche Kunsthalle Karlsruhe
- 2024/2025: Hans Thoma – Zwischen Poesie und Wirklichkeit ("Hans Thoma - Between poesy and reality"). Augustiner Museum, Freiburg.

== Honours ==
- A stone portrait of Thoma is one of the figures that decorate the columns of the Stephanienbrunnen in Karlsruhe as gargoyles.
- The municipal council of St. Blasien awarded him honorary citizenship on 25 September 1919, certified on 2 October 1920; in addition, an alley in the north of the city is named after him.
- Around 1870, he had created four impressive depictions of Laufenburg, the city honoured him with the naming of a school completed in 1932 as well as an alley.
- The Baden-Württemberg State Prize for Fine Arts was called Hans Thoma Prize until February 2024.
- On 1 September 1993, an asteroid was named after him: 5492 Thoma.
- Several schools, mainly in Baden-Wurttemberg, bear the painter's name, including the Hans-Thoma-Gymnasium in Lorrach.
- Many streets and squares, such as in Berlin, Bremen, Frankfurt am Main, Heidelberg, Karlsruhe, Mannheim, Potsdam and Wiesbaden, were named after him. In 2025, on the initiative of the Green parliamentary group in the local city council, a comment will be attached to the signage of the street in Karlsruhe that mentions the artist's antisemitic attitude.

== Literature ==
- Fries, F. (1898). "Hans Thoma". Deutsche Kunst und Dekoration (2): 339–355.
- Meissner, Franz Hermann (1899). Hans Thoma. Berlin; Leipzig: Schuster & Loeffler.
- Spier, A. (1900). Hans Thoma. Ein Portrait. Frankfurt a. M.: Heinrich Keller.
- Spier A. (1900). "Hans Thoma". Die Kunst unserer Zeit. 1 (11). Munich: 61–112. Archived from the original on 2008-07-25.
- von Ostini, Fritz (1900). Thoma. Bielefeld; Leipzig: Verlag von Velhagen und Klasing.
