= Cella Thoma =

German painter (1858–1901)

Bonicella (Cella) Thoma née Berteneder (14 April 1858 – 23 November 1901) was a painter and wife of the painter Hans Thoma.

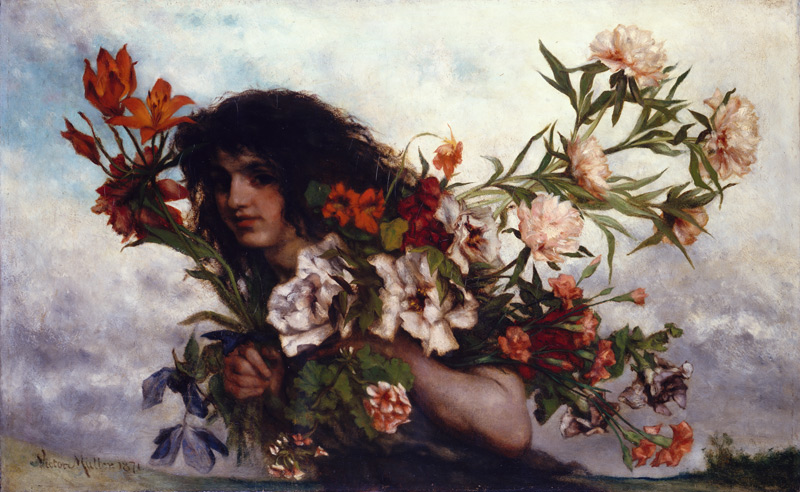
Victor Müller, Flower girl (1871), with Cella Berteneder as model

== Life ==
Cella Thoma was born in Landshut or Munich. She came from a family of farmers and craftsmen and had been a model for the painter Victor Müller in his Munich studio since 1869. There she met Hans Thoma; she soon became his model and, a year later, a painting pupil. On 19 June 1877, she married Hans in Säckingen and moved into a flat with him and his mother and sister Agathe in Frankfurt/Main. As the marriage remained childless and Thoma cared for her niece Ella, they adopted her in 1878. Together, the four of them moved to Kronberg im Taunus in 1899, where Hans became a member of the Malerkolonie there. When he received a call to Karlsruhe in 1901, the flat was given up. Thoma only lived in Karlsruhe for a short time, as she succumbed to the consequences of appendicitis while travelling in Constance in the same year.

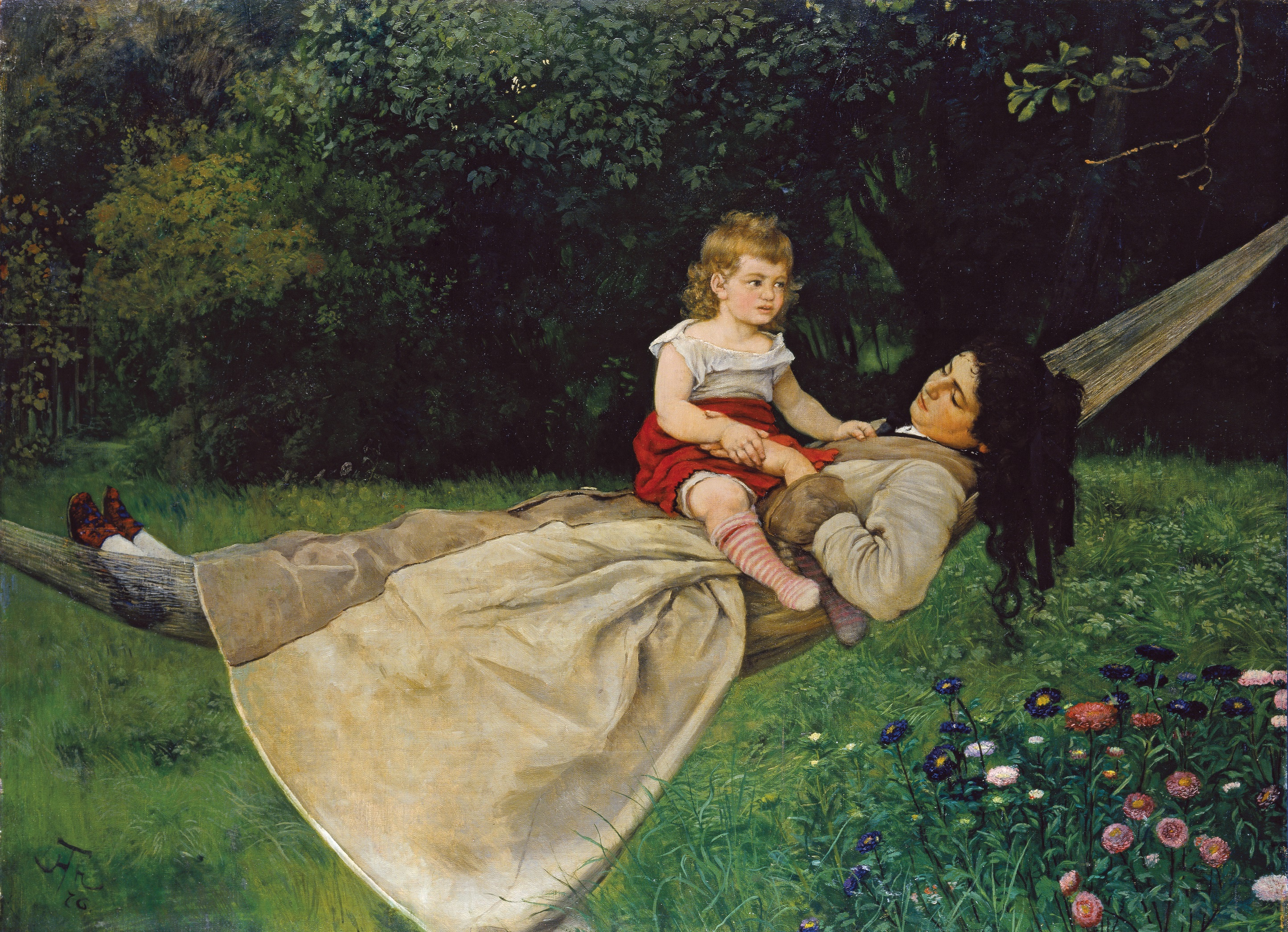
Hans Thoma, In a Hammock (1876), depicting Thoma with niece/adopted daughter Ella

Thoma continued to devote herself to art after her marriage and was known as a flower and still life painter. On 23 November 1901, she died in Constance at the age of 43.

== Works (selection) ==
- 1875: Alpine roses, oil on paper
- 1878: Still life with fruit and two glasses, oil on canvas, 30 × 37 cm
- 1880: Fruit Still Life
- Still Life with Vegetables and Fruit, oil on paper on wood, 48 × 76 cm
- Flowering Branches in a Handled Basket
- Rose Still Life
- Anemones
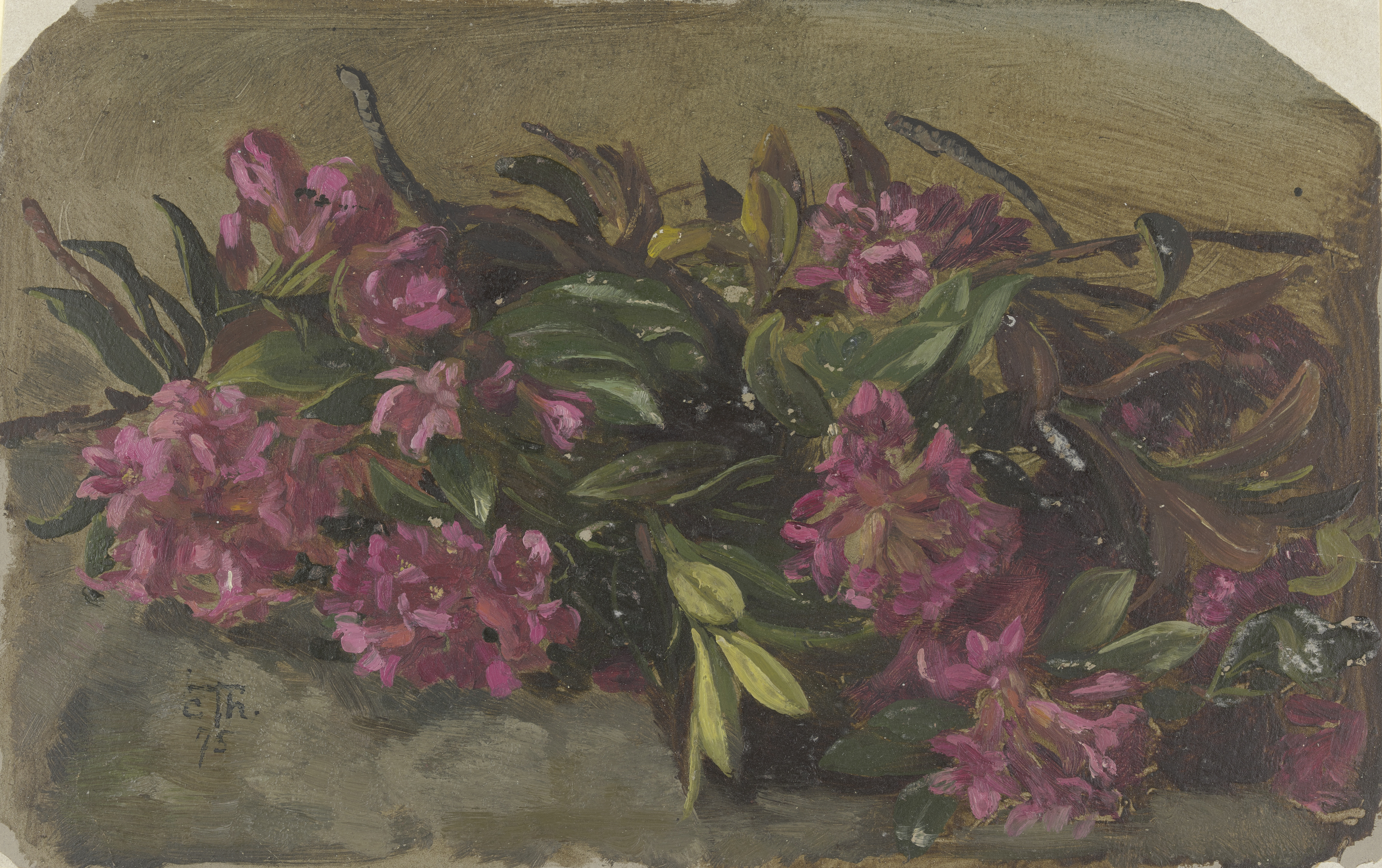
Alpenrosen, 1875

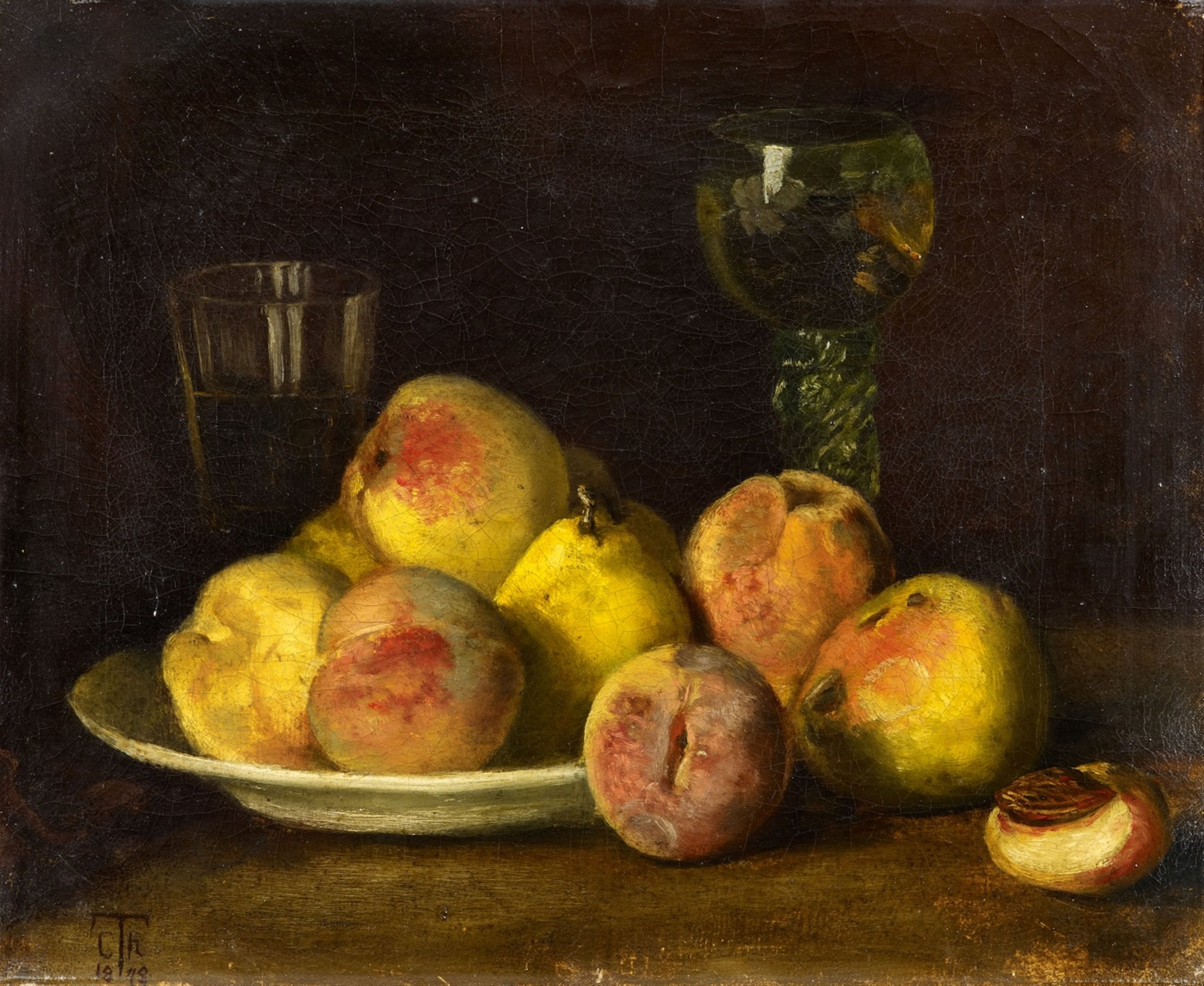
Stillleben mit Früchten und zwei Gläsern, 1878

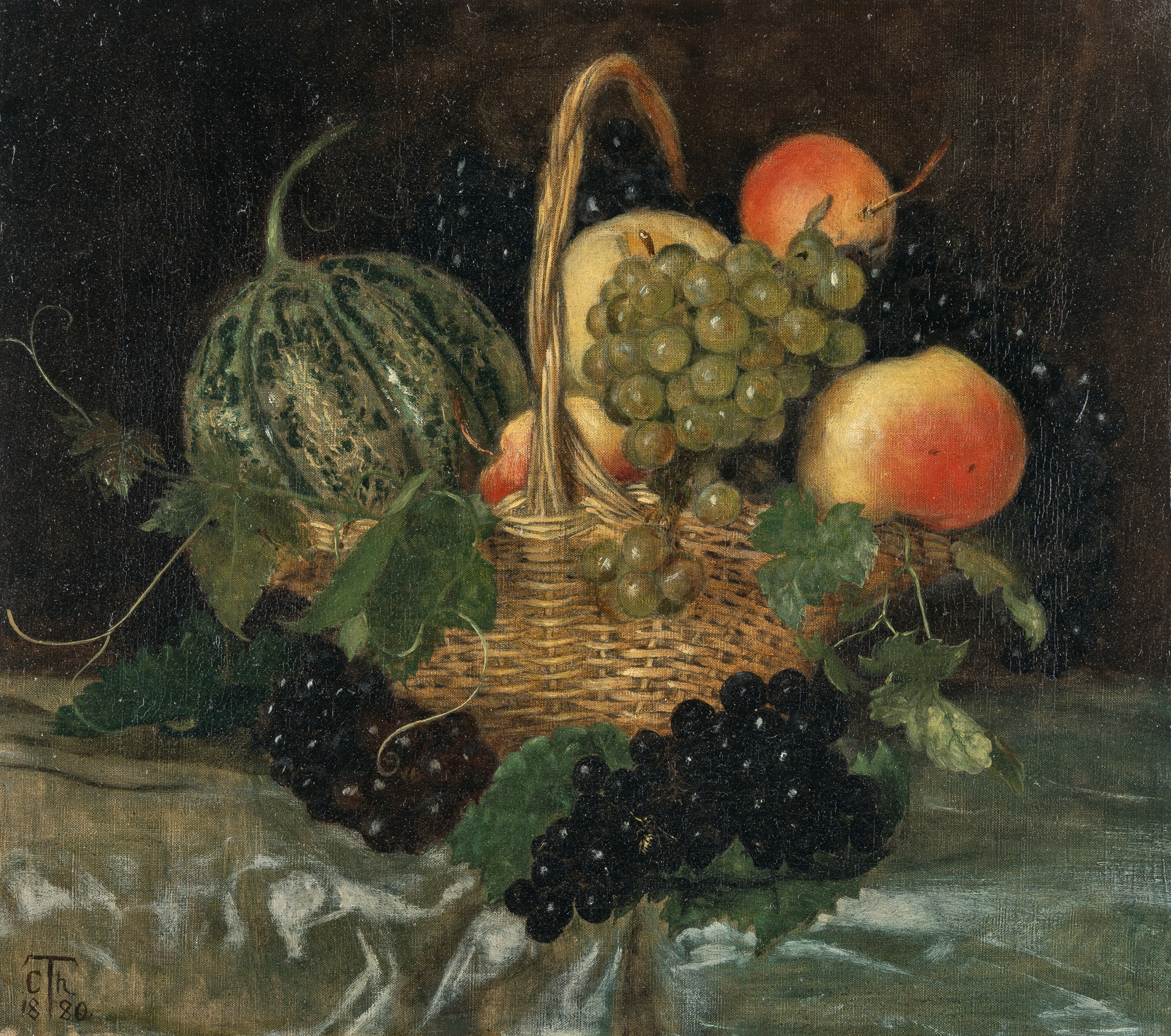
Früchtestillleben, 1880

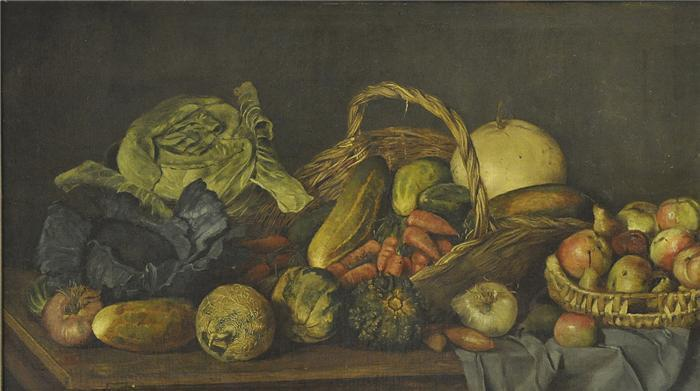
Üppiges Stillleben mit Gemüse

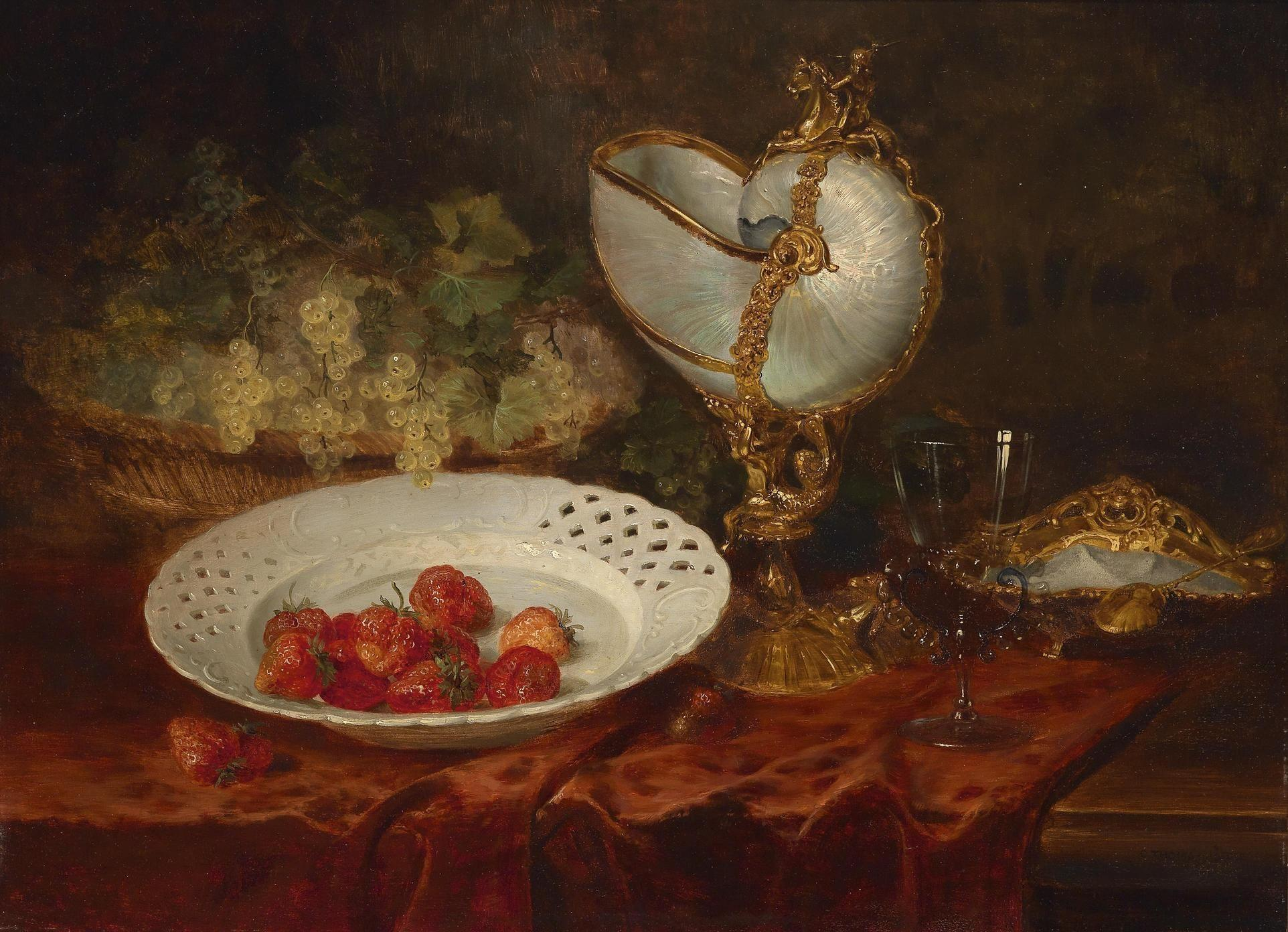
Stillleben mit Erdbeeren

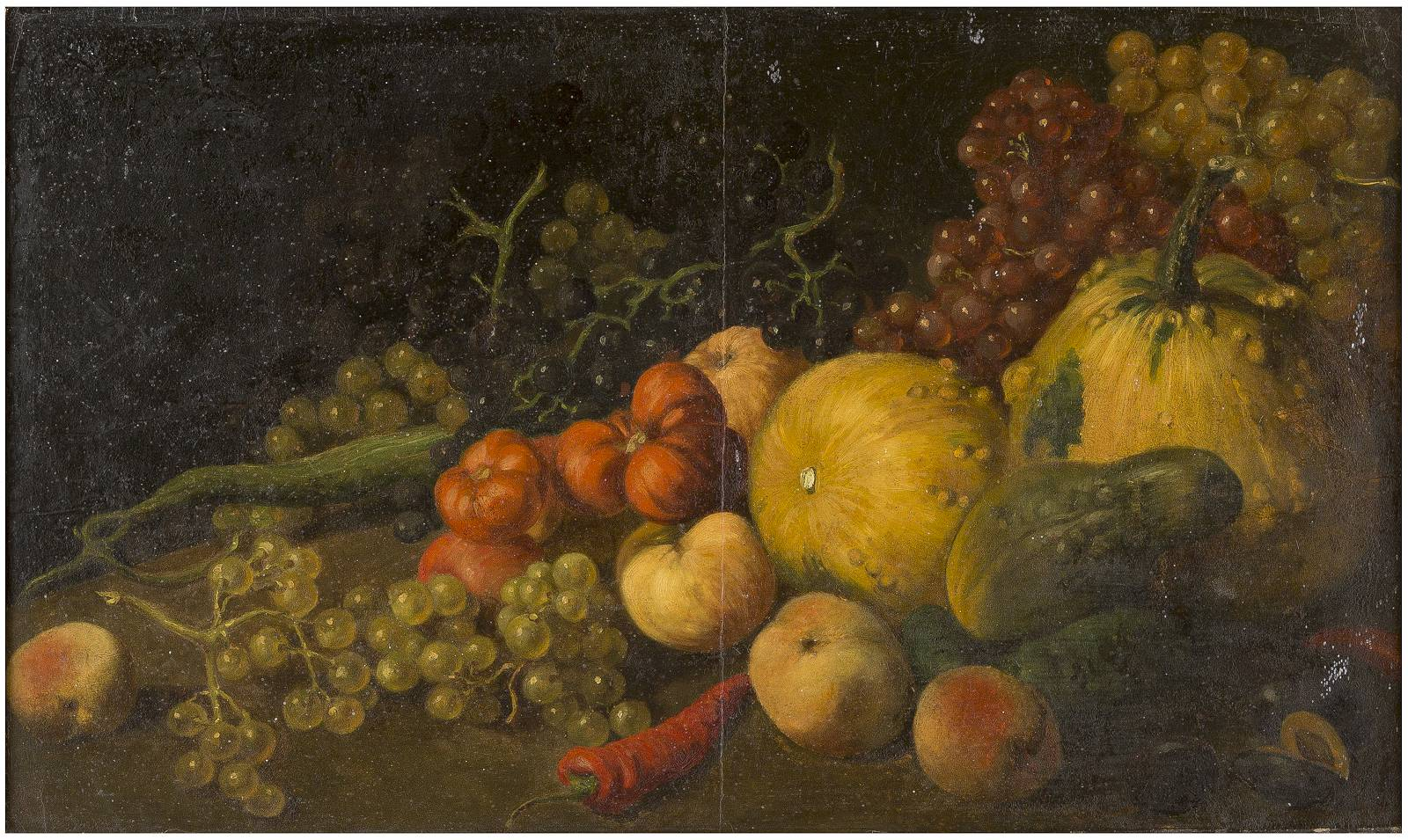
Stillleben mit Gemüse und Früchten

== Literature ==
- Thoma, Cella. In: Ulrich Thieme, Felix Becker, Fred. C. Willis, Hans VollmerHans Vollmer (Hrsg.): Allgemeines Lexikon der Bildenden Künstler von der Antike bis zur Gegenwart. Begründet von Ulrich Thieme und Felix Becker. 37 Bände. (1907–1950, Band 1 bis 15 online einsehbar). Wilhelm Engelmann, E. A. Seemann, Leipzig.
- Joseph August Beringer (1979), Badische Malerei: 1770-1920 (Zeite, im Text überarbeitete und bedeutend erweiterte Auflage), Karlsruhe: Müller, ISBN 978-3-7880-9623-6
- Christa von Helmolt: Hans Thoma. Spiegelbilder, Stuttgart 1988, ISBN 3-608-76261-2.
- August Wiederspahn, Helmut Bode (ed.): Die Kronberger Malerkolonie. A contribution to the Frankfurt art history of the 19th century. Kramer, Frankfurt am Main 1982, ISBN 3-7829-0183-5.
