= Martin Flersheim =

German businessman and art collector (1856–1935)

Martin Ludwig Flersheim (born April 18, 1856 in Frankfurt am Main; died December 7, 1935 ibid.) was a German businessman, entrepreneur, art collector, patron and patron of the Frankfurt art scene and served on the board of the Städelscher Museums-Verein for almost four decades. He donated works of art to his native city, which can still be seen in Frankfurt museums today.

== Family ==
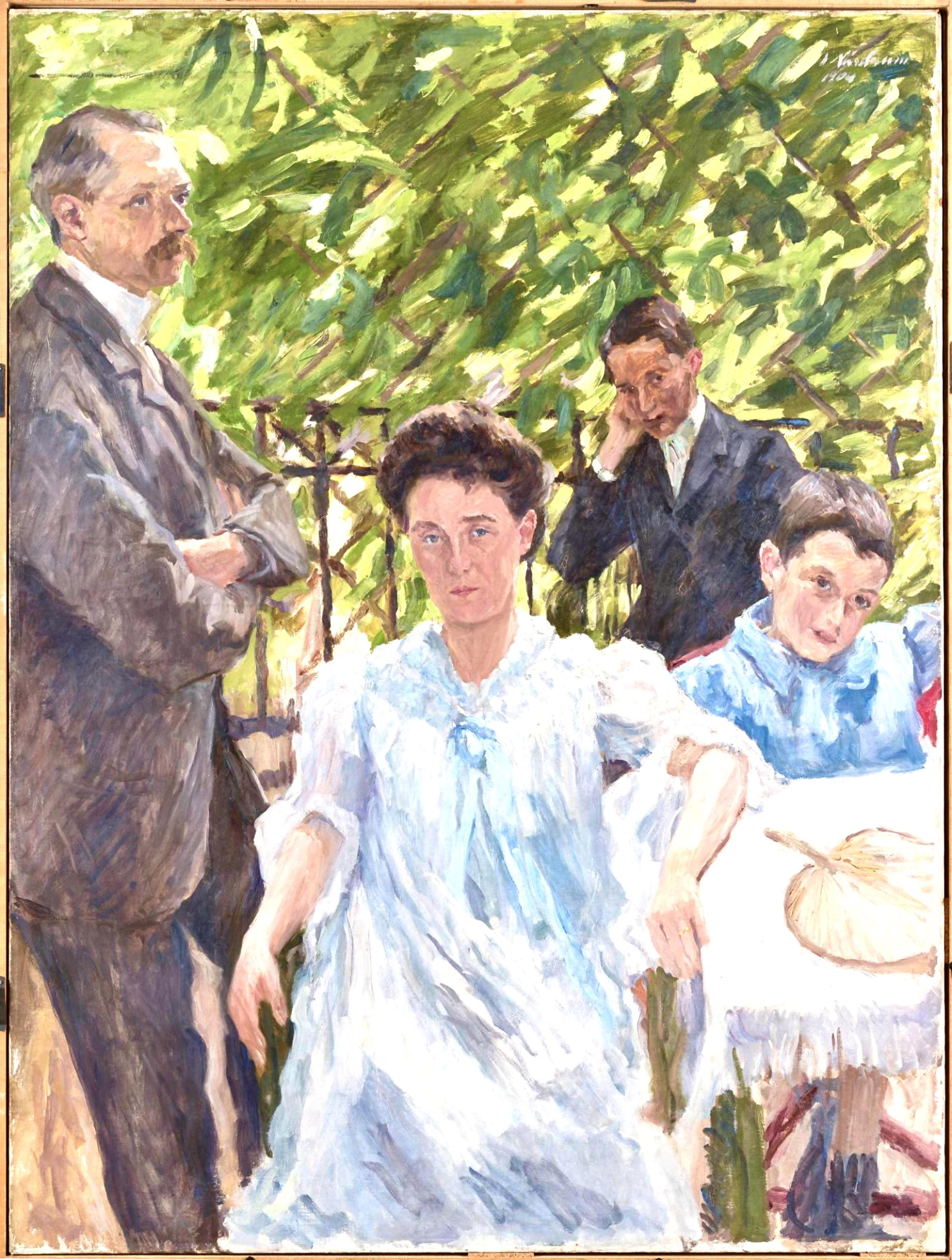
Portrait by Jakob Nussbaum: 48-year-old Martin Flersheim with his 39-year-old wife Florence, née Livingston, and his two 16- and 12-year-old sons Herbert and Friedrich (far right), summer 1904

He was the first child of Louis Flersheim , a merchant and entrepreneur who had lived at Feuerbachstraße 47 (building not preserved) in Frankfurt's Westend since 1880, and his wife Gutha "Gitta" Johanna, née Fürth. The villa of the Louis Flersheim family stood in a free location opposite the palace of the Duke of Nassau. The Flersheim family had lived in Frankfurt am Main since the 17th century, initially in the Ostend (Judengasse) and later in the Westend. Martin had three younger siblings.

The 30-year-old Martin Flersheim married the 23-year-old American Florence Mary Livingston in Frankfurt am Main on January 23, 1887. The couple lived in Frankfurt's Westend at Mendelssohnstraße 78 (building not preserved). The marriage produced two sons, Herbert “Heriberto” Ludwig Sidney (born on November 4, 1887 in Frankfurt am Main; died on October 3, 1954 in Acassuso, Partido San Isidro, near Buenos Aires, Argentina) and Friedrich “Fritz” Georg (born on August 7, 1892 in Frankfurt am Main; died as Frederick G. Flersheim in April 1977 in New York City, New York, United States).

== Works ==
Martin Ludwig Flersheim (born 1862) was a German import/export merchant and entrepreneur, co-owner of the family business Flersheim-Hess from 1887, alongside his younger brother, Ernst Carl, from 1892. The company, originally based in Frankfurt's Töngesgasse 17I (building no longer preserved) and later at Mainzer Landstraße 191 (also no longer preserved), imported a variety of materials including ivory, fishbone, overseas wood, horn, mother-of-pearl, bamboo, and tortoiseshell from Africa, Asia, and South America. These materials were used in the production of items such as billiard balls, combs, brushes, cutlery handles, buttons, corset stays, tobacco pipes, and ornately decorated walking sticks. In addition to these finished products, Flersheim-Hess also traded in fashion accessories and hardware.

Martin Flersheim joined his father's business at the age of fifteen and played a key role in its development. By the time of World War I, Flersheim-Hess had achieved an annual turnover of 6 million marks. Flersheim was also listed in the Prussian millionaire's yearbook for his wealth.

== Art collections ==
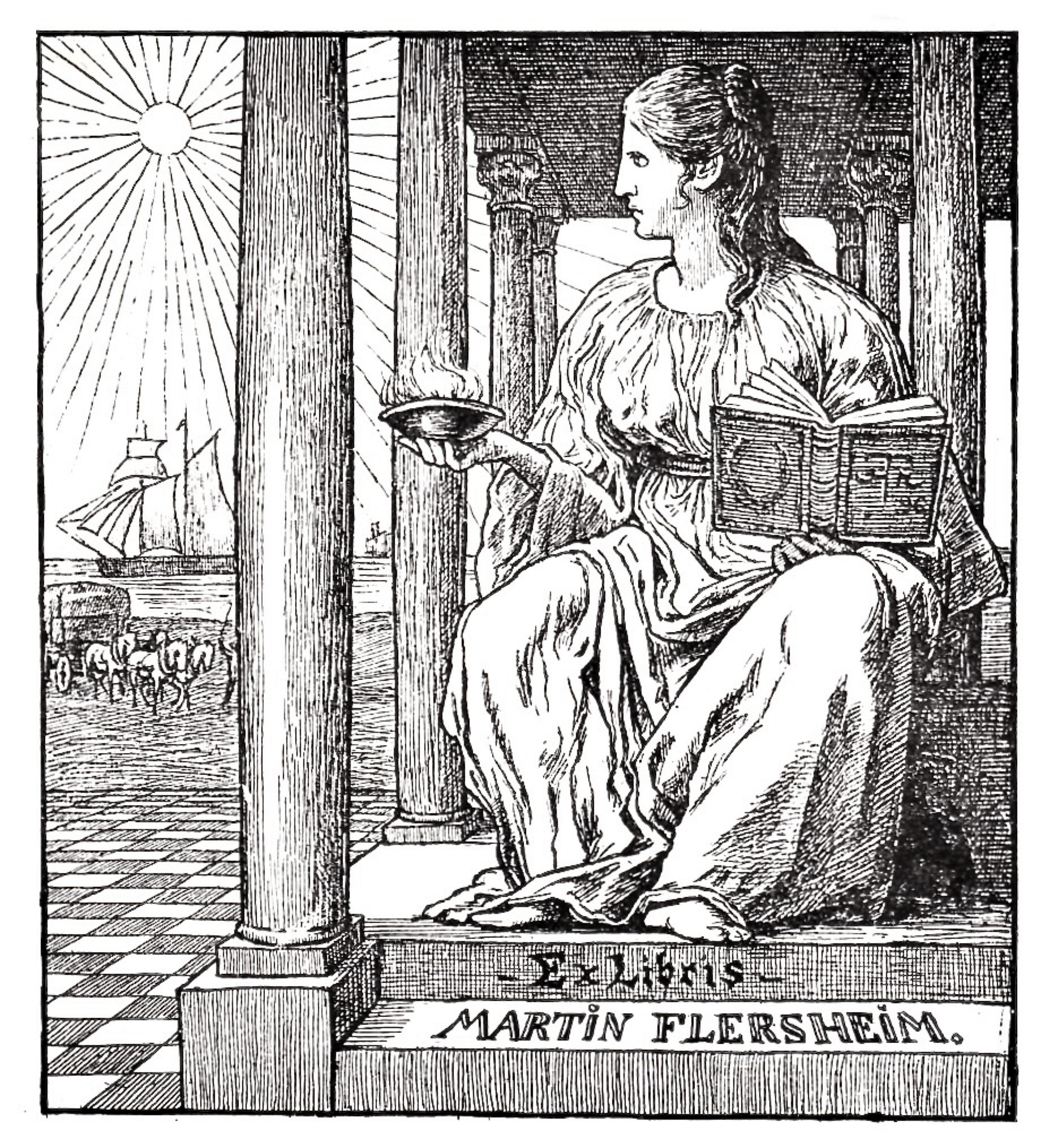
Exlibris von Hans Thoma für Martin Flersheim, 1896

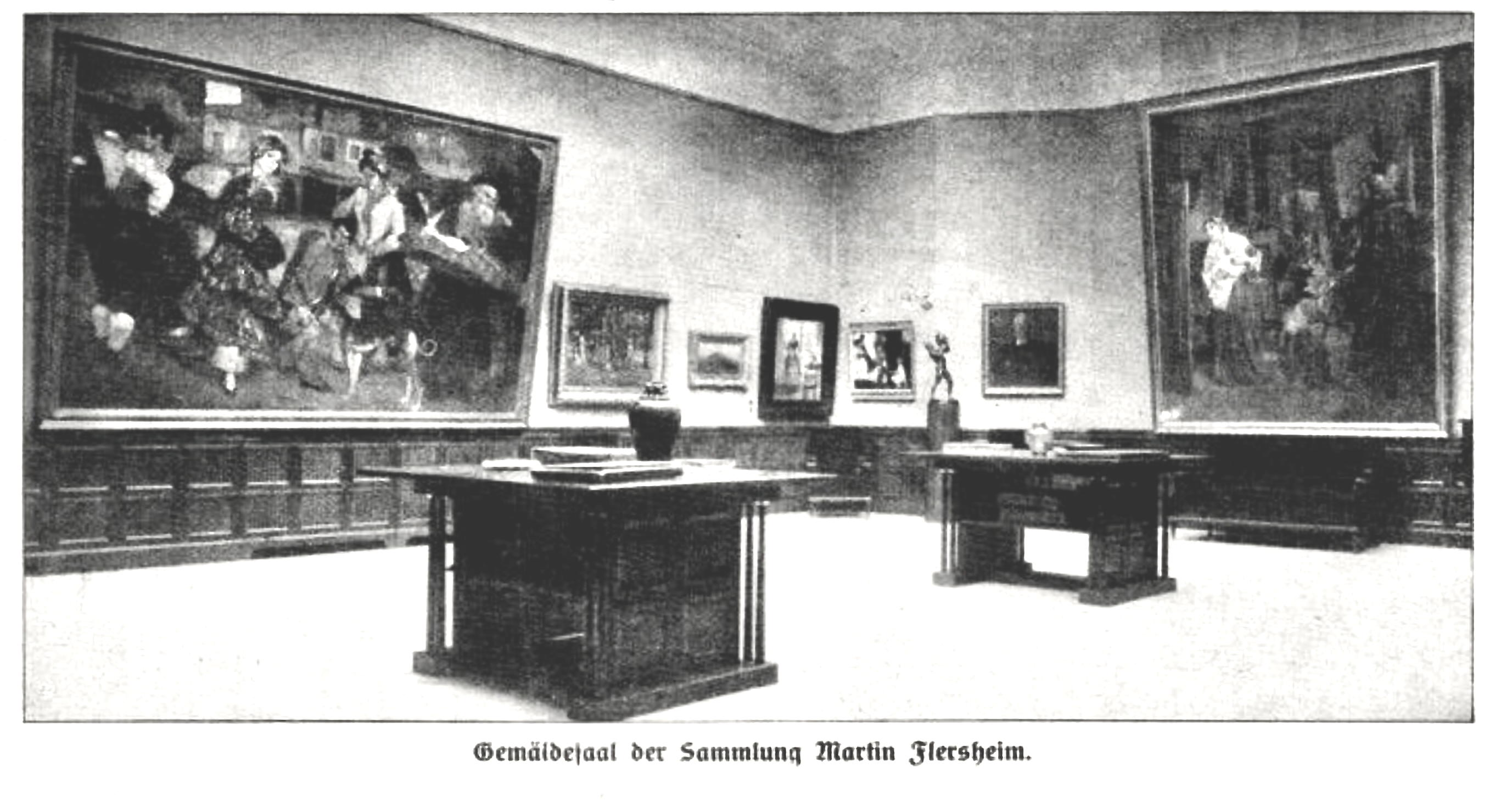
Gemäldegalerie der Villa Mendelssohnstraße 78, 1909

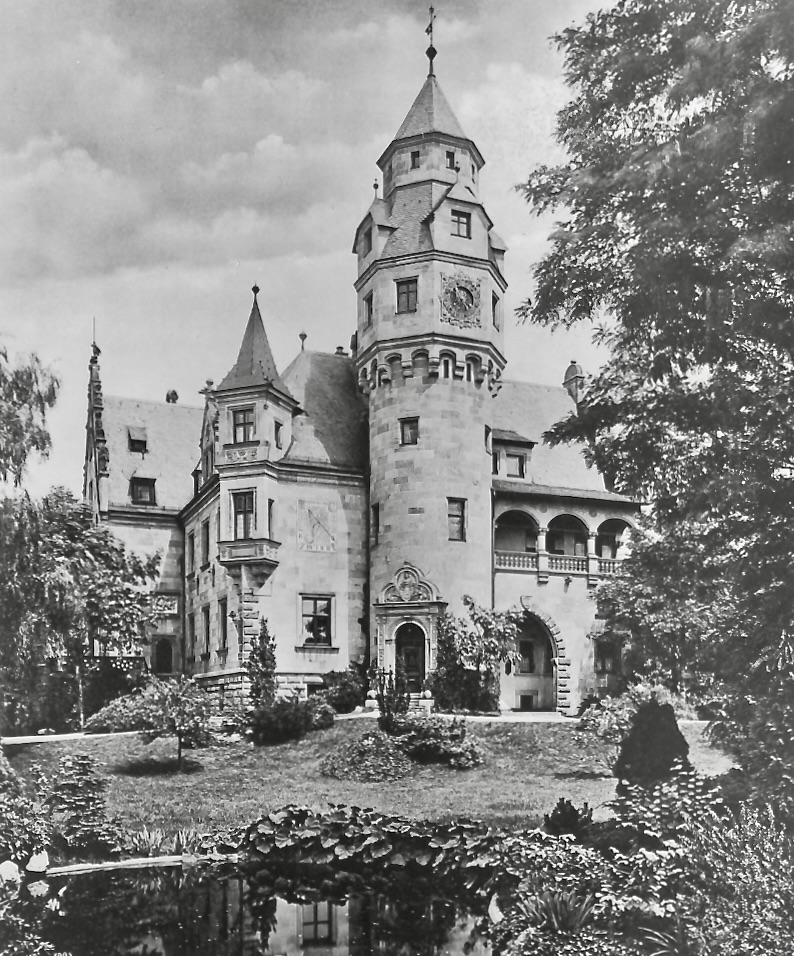
Villa Liebieg, Frankfurt am Main, 1905

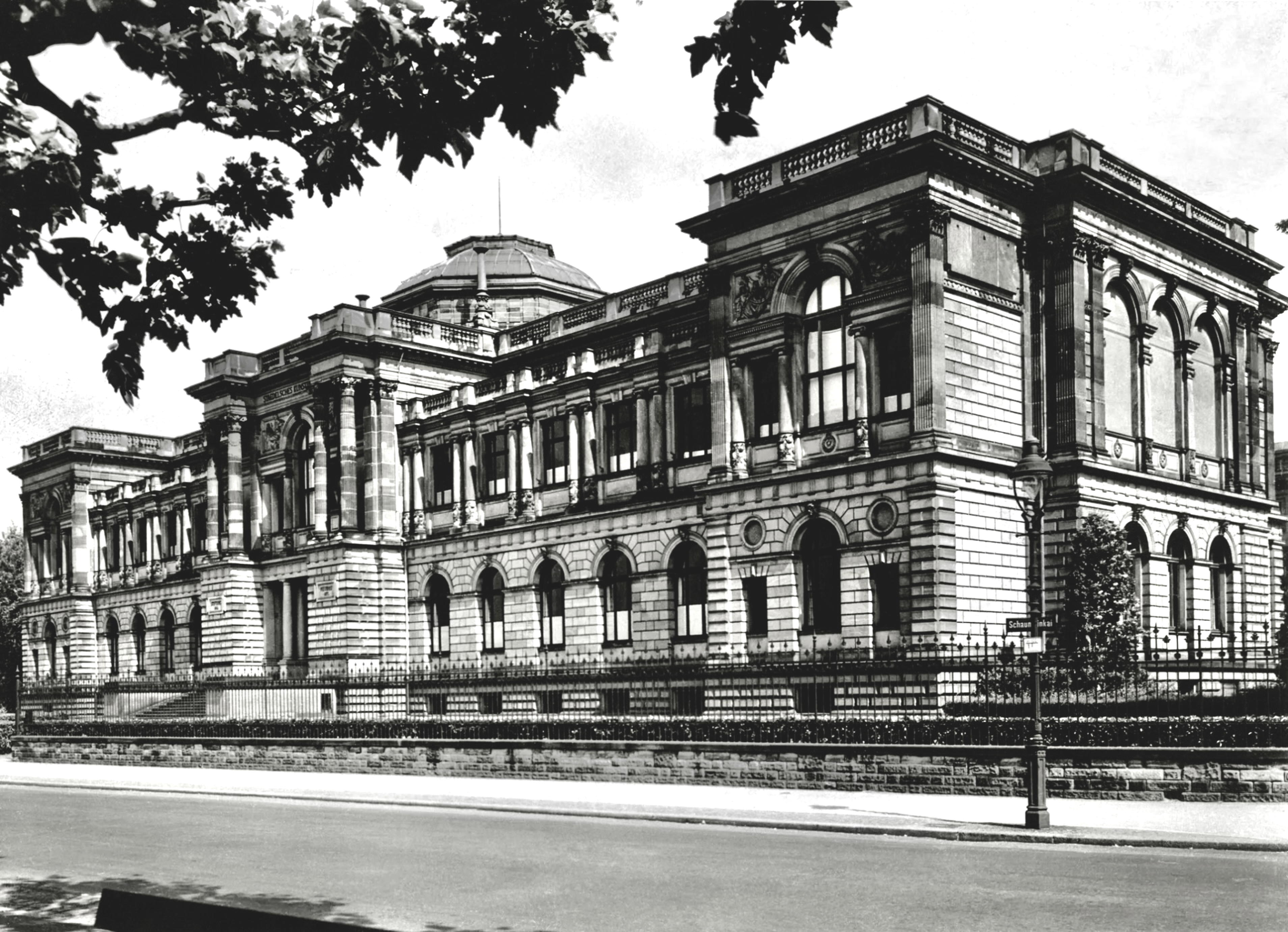
Städel-Museum, Frankfurt am Main, um 1929

According to autobiographical statements by his brother Ernst Carl, Martin Flersheim, together with his wife Florence Mary, compiled a library of several thousand volumes and a collection of works of art by contemporary painters and sculptors of the 19th and early 20th centuries, starting after their marriage, which included works by Jacob Alberts, Ferdinand Barbedienne, Peter Becker, Arnold Böcklin, Charles Camoin, Honoré Daumier, Louis Eysen, Vincent van Gogh, Auguste Herbin, Ferdinand Hodler, Leopold von Kalckreuth, Käthe Kollwitz, Franz von Lenbach, Max Liebermann, Carl Morgenstern, Johann Friedrich Morgenstern, Jakob Nussbaum, Adolf Oberländer, Otto Scholderer, Carl Spitzweg, Franz von Stuck, Hans Thoma, Wilhelm Trübner and Fritz von Uhde.

Martin Flersheim had his bookplate, which was glued into the bibliophile works in his library, designed by Hans Thoma in 1896. The couple were also friends with a number of artists, in particular Jakob Nussbaum. In their city villa at Mendelssohnstraße 78, built around 1895, where, according to house guest Harry Graf Kessler, an “extensive, rather colorful collection of pictures” of contemporary works of art was exhibited, they cultivated a high level of hospitality and organized weekly receptions, readings and recitation evenings, musical performances and vernissages, at which, among others the literary historian Ernst Beutler, the writer Kasimir Edschmid, the art collector couple Rosy Fischer (1869-1926) and Ludwig Fischer (1860-1922), the entrepreneur and art collector Harry Fuld, the doctor of law Rudolf Heilbrunn, the manufacturer and art collector Robert von Hirsch, the banker and art collector Hugo Nathan (1861-1921), the editor Benno Reifenberg, the salonière Lilly von Schnitzler, the publisher Heinrich Simon and the art historians Georg Swarzenski and Alfred Wolters were regular participants.

Ich habe Nussbaum, solange er noch in Frankfurt war, sehr viel gesehen, beispielsweise an den Sonntag-Abenden im Hause Martin Flersheim, des leidenschaftlichen Kunstfreundes, Kunstsammlers, Mäzens, in dessen schönem Haus mit dem pompösen Galerie-Anbau sich alle Frankfurter trafen, für die der Umgang mit Kunst ernsthafte Bedeutung hatte.

— Alfred Wolters, ab 1928 Direktor der Städtischen Galerie, Frankfurt am Main

Um den runden Tisch bei Martin und Florence Flersheim in der Mendelssohnstraße versammelten sich sonntags Kunstfreunde und Kenner, um bei einem Glas Wein Fragen von Kunst und Politik zu besprechen. Hier traf ich oft Marie und Georg Swarzenski, die sich in dem gastlichen Hause kennengelernt hatten, den Maler Jakob Nussbaum, den Schriftsteller Kasimir Edschmid […]

— Rudolf Heilbrunn

Martin Flersheim belonged to institutions in Frankfurt's art scene, supported various artists financially and patronized the Städel and the Liebieghaus. From the founding of the Städelscher Museums-Verein in 1899 until his death, he was a member of its board. Flersheim donated Spitzweg's work Der Einsiedler vor der Klause to the Städel in 1900 and Scholderer's work Der Geiger am Fenster in 1921.

Martin Flersheim died at the age of 79 after a long illness and was buried in the New Jewish Cemetery in the city of his birth.

After his death, his widow and two sons inherited the extensive art collection.

== Nazi persecution and Aryanization ==
When the Nazis came to power in Germany in 1933, Flersheim's family was persecuted because of their Jewish heritage. His assets, including part of the art collection had to be sold far below their value during the National Socialist era in the context of “de-Jewification” or “Aryanization”. Another part was taken to the Netherlands and stored in Amsterdam, but was confiscated there by the Nazi looting organization, the Einsatzstab Reichsleiter Rosenberg (ERR) during the German occupation.

Since 2000, some works from the holdings of German museums have been returned to their descendants as part of the restitution of looted art. The Flersheim heirs have registered 344 search requests for Nazi-looted object on the German Lost Art Foundation Database.

== Memberships (selection) ==
- Deutsche Gesellschaft zur Bekämpfung der Geschlechtskrankheiten
- Frankfurter Gesellschaft für Handel, Industrie und Wissenschaft – Casino-Gesellschaft von 1802
- Frankfurter Kunstverein
- Freies Deutsches Hochstift
- Mitteldeutscher Kunstgewerbe-Verein
- Physikalischer Verein
- Senckenbergische Naturforschende Gesellschaft
- Städelscher Museums-Verein

== Positions held ==
- Verwaltungsratsmitglied des Frankfurter Kunstvereins (bis 1934)
- Vorstandsmitglied des Städelschen Museums-Vereins (seit 1899)

== Literature ==
- Whence we came, where we went: From the Rhine to the Main to the Elbe, from the Thames to the Hudson – A Family History. W.A.E. Books. 2002. ISBN 0-9651645-6-X.
