= Hedwig Ullmann =

German Jewish art collector

Hedwig Frida Ullmann, née Nathan, (born 2 November 1872 in Frankfurt am Main, Germany; died 1945, Melbourne, Australia) was a German Jewish art collector and refugee.

== Life ==
Hedwig Ullmann (née Nathan) was the wife of Albert Ulmann (1962–1912) and the sister of Leopold Siegfried Nathan et Dr. jur. Hugo Nathan. Ullmann's eldest son moved to Milan, Italy, in 1929.

== Nazi persecution ==
When the Nazis came to power in 1933, Ullmann and her family were persecuted due to their Jewish heritage. Her youngest son and his family fled Germany in 1935 and settled in Milan. Ullmann emigrated to Milan on 25 May 1938 and to Australia after that. In 1938, Nazi anti-Jewish laws required German Jews to register assets above a certain value, causing Hedwig Ullmann and her two adult sons to lose much of their art collection.

== Claims for restitution of the Ullmann art collection ==
In 2013 a provenance research project at the Historisches Museum Frankfurt resulted in the restitution of the painting “Sommer (Frau und Junge)” (Summer (Woman and Boy)) by Hans Thoma to the Ullmann heirs.

In 2017 The German food processing company Dr. Oetker announced that it would restitute a Nazi-looted painting from its corporate art collection to Ulmann's heirs. Oekter's decision to restitute the painting without forcing the family to launch a lawsuit was praised in the press.

In 2020 Malcolm Gladwell dedicated an episode of his Revisionist History podcast to the story van Gogh's Vase with Carnations, which Ulmann owned prior to World War II. They sold the van Gogh before fleeing Germany for Australia to escape the Nazis, and the painting eventually arrived at the Detroit Institute of Arts. When the Ullmann family, which had changed its name to Ulin, located the painting, they requested it be returned, but the museum refused. Gladwell is critical of the museum's position, stating "It was impossible to be a German Jew after Kristallnacht and to imagine you were safe". However the Detroit Institute of Arts refused restitution.

Ullmann died in 1945 in Australia. Her heirs are still searching for artworks that had belonged to her before the Nazis.
