= Johann Georg Mohr =

German painter (1864–1943)

Johann Georg Mohr (1864–1943) was a German painter, associated with the Kronberger Malerkolonie.

He was born in the Free City of Frankfurt, where he studied at the Städelschule and at the Academy of Berlin. Among his classmates at the Städel Institute included Fritz Rumpf, Robert Forell, Oscar Goebel, Jacob Happ (1861-1936) and the sculptor Hugo Kauffmann. In the first decade of the 20th century Mohr founded his own art school in Frankfurt. He died at the age of 79 in his hometown.

== Style ==
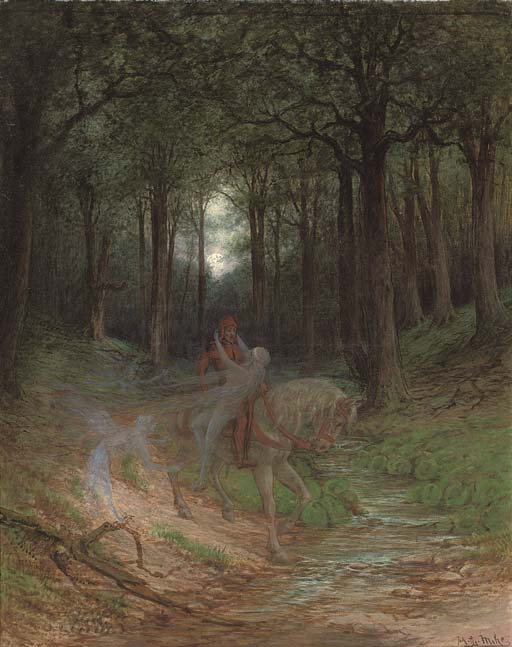
"Fairies bewitching a traveller in a moonlit forest"

In spite of his studies under various masters in Frankfurt and Berlin, his art has little in common with modern ideas, and is formed partly by his early impressions of the simple idyllic life of his native district, partly by his sympathy with the early German masters. In his love of the details of nature, in his precise (though by no means faultless) drawing of outline, and in his predilection for local coloring, he has distinct affinities with the Pre-Raphaelites.
