= Ottmar Strauss =

Ottmar Edwin Strauss (19 May 1878 in Ludwigshafen; died 25 August 1941 in Zurich) was a German-Jewish industrialist and art collector persecuted by the Nazis.

== Life ==
Strauss was born as the youngest of eight children from the first marriage of his father, Emanuel Strauss, an iron goods dealer and construction entrepreneur from Ludwigshafen, and his wife Sara, née Baum. From his father’s second marriage, he had three half-siblings. After being expelled from several schools, he finally completed his education in 1893 at a Einjähriges school in Frankfurt am Main. He then began training in his father’s trade.

Around the turn of the century, he moved to Cologne and joined the iron wholesale company Nathan Pelzer Wwe. in Rodenkirchen near Cologne, where Otto Wolff also worked. The two decided to become independent and, on June 25, 1904, founded the iron goods wholesale company Otto Wolff in Cologne—the seed of what later became the Otto Wolff Group. Strauss held a 42.5% stake in the company until his departure.

As the company grew significantly in the following years, Strauss was appointed Geheimer Regierungsrat (Privy Government Councillor) during World War I and tasked with supplying munitions to the allied Ottoman Empire. After the war, as the company expanded further in the steel industry and trade, Strauss became one of the leading industrialists of the Weimar Republic. He established the Strauss Foundation to support citizens in need after the war.

Strauss also owned several notable properties: from 1924, the Fronhof estate in Heisterbacherrott; from 1919, Haus Heisterberg on the Petersberg; and the former Villa Stollwerck in Cologne. He and his wife, Emma, had three children: daughters Lotte and Erika (who married the painter Fritz Kronenberg) and son Ulrich.

== Nazi era persecution and emigration ==
When the Nazis came to power in Germany in 1933, Strauss was persecuted due to his Jewish heritage under Nazi racial laws. Strauss was forced, under the process of “Aryanization” by which Jewish property was forcibly transferred to non-Jews, to resign from the company’s management and sell his shares to Otto Wolff at far below their real value. His art collection was auctioned by the Hugo Helbig auction house in 1934 and 1935 to pays the Reichsfluchtsteuer (exit tax) and other discriminatory taxes in order to finance his flight from Nazi Germany.

After emigrating to Switzerland on December 29, 1936, he succeeded in arranging his son Ulrich’s emigration to the United States.

== Art collection ==
In 2004, a painting by Hans Thoma, Dämmerung am Gardasee: dusk at the lago di Garda, was restituted by the Bavarian State Paintings Collection to the heirs of Ottmar Strauss.

In March 2017, the Bavarian National museum in Munich announced that it had restituted an ivory diptych with scenes from the life of Christ to the Strauss's heirs.

In May 2024, three Chinese porcelain vases from his forcibly sold art collection were restituted to Strauss’s heirs as Nazi-looted art.

As of November 2025, the German Lost Art Foundation listed 2018 search requests for artworks from the Strauss collection, of which 32 had the status "Restituted."

== Literature ==
- Dieter Mechlinski: Der Geheime Regierungsrat Ottmar Edwin Strauss – Biografie eines vergessenen Königswinterer Mitbürgers. 6. Auflage. Hrsg. Heimatverein Oberdollendorf und Römlinghoven. Königswinter 2010.
- Elfi Pracht: Ottmar Strauss: Industrieller, Staatsbeamter, Kunstsammler. In: Julius H. Schoeps, Karl E. Grözinger, Ludger Heid, Gert Mattenklott (Hrsg.): Menora. Jahrbuch für deutsch-jüdische Geschichte. 1994. München 1994, ISBN 3-492-11917-4, S. 39–70.
- Joseph Walk (Hrsg.): Kurzbiographien zur Geschichte der Juden 1918–1945. Hrsg. vom Leo Baeck Institute, Jerusalem. Saur, München 1988, ISBN 3-598-10477-4.
- Strauss, Ottmar, in: Werner Röder, Herbert A. Strauss (Hrsg.): Biographisches Handbuch der deutschsprachigen Emigration nach 1933. Band I: Politik, Wirtschaft, Öffentliches Leben. München: Saur 1980, ISBN 3-598-10087-6, S. 745.
