= Joseph August Beringer =

German art historian (1862–1937)

Joseph August Beringer (27 January 1862, in Niederrimsingen – 6 December 1937, in Mannheim) was a German art historian, who specialised in classical modernity and published widely about the art of Electoral Palatinate and Baden. He further lectured at the State Academy of Fine Arts Karlsruhe, and the University of Mannheim, and was a well-regarded member of the Nazi party.
