= Nazi looting of artworks by Vincent van Gogh =

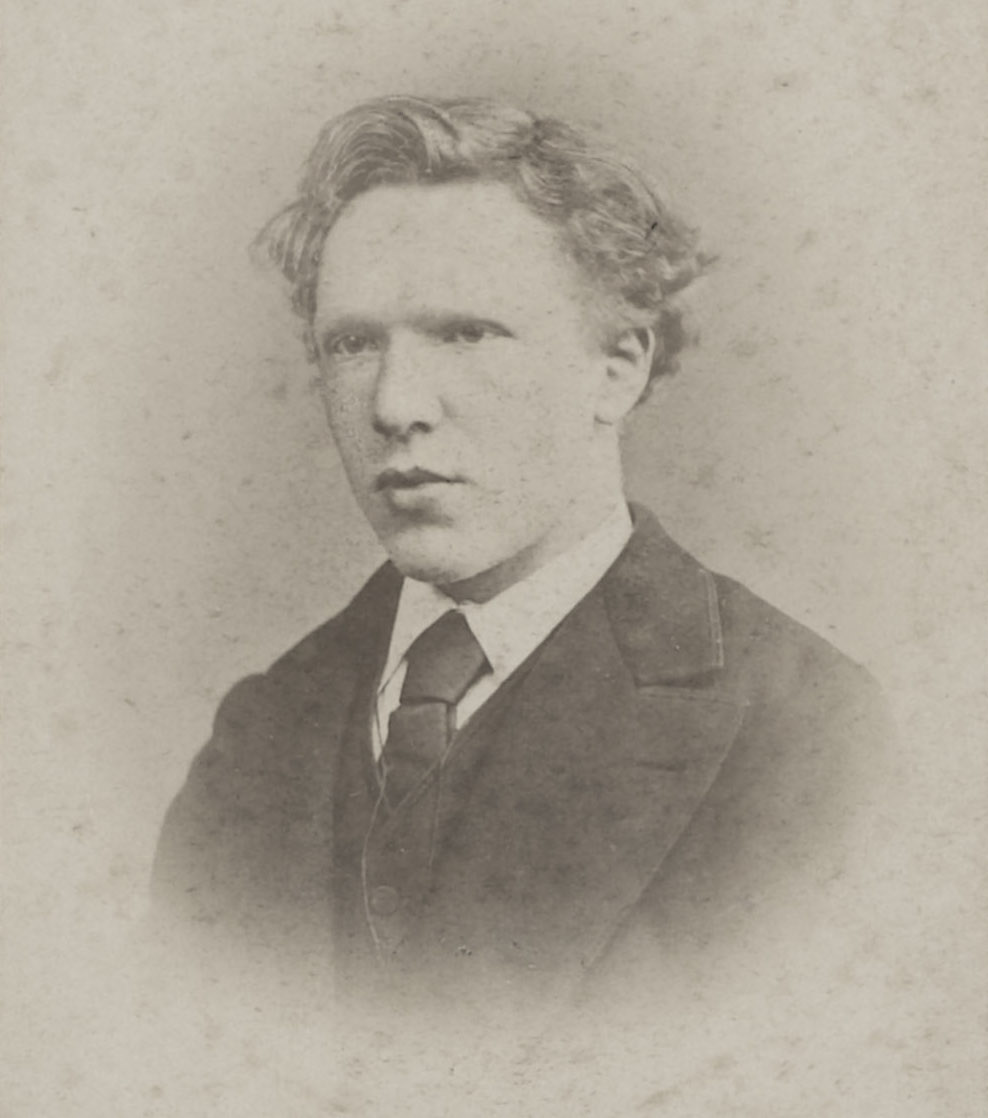
Vincent van Gogh photographed in 1873

Many priceless artworks by the Dutch Post-Impressionist artist Vincent van Gogh were looted by Nazis during 1933–1945, mostly from Jewish collectors forced into exile or murdered.

Some of these works have disappeared into private collections, others have resurfaced in museums, at auction, or have been reclaimed, often in high profile lawsuits taken by their former owners. However, the German Lost Art Foundation still lists dozens of missing van Goghs. As of 2021, the Nazi Era Provenance Internet Portal, published by the American Alliance of Museums, lists 73 van Gogh paintings acquired by American museums after 1933 with questionable provenance.

== Background ==
Vincent van Gogh (1853–1890), the famous Dutch Post-Impressionist painter, was one of many artists whose artworks were looted by Nazis, either by direct seizure or by forced or duress sales. From 1933–1945, an estimated 20% of all artwork in Europe was plundered by Nazis. All property owned by Jews, including artworks, were seized as part of the Holocaust. Van Gogh's many Jewish collectors, who had played an important role in the popularisation and dissemination of van Gogh's work, were targeted. In the Netherlands, van Gogh's birthplace and home of many of his collectors, 75% of the Jews were murdered in the Holocaust, and special Nazi looting organizations seized all their property, including art. Some artworks were sold to finance the Nazi war machine, and other entered the private collections of Nazi officials. Some of the most famous van Gogh artworks passed through Nazi hands, and many have never been found.

== Van Gogh's Jewish collectors ==
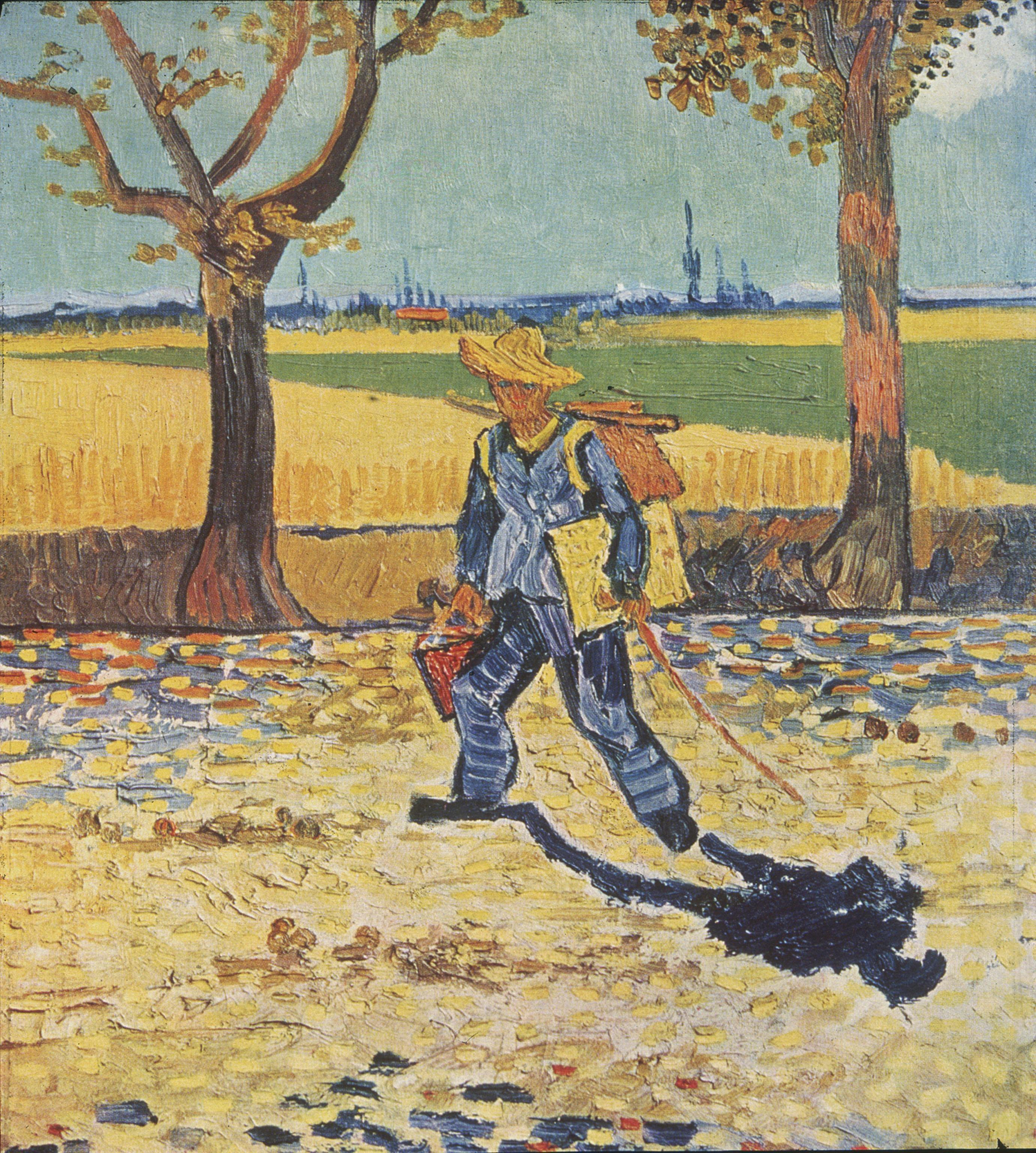
Painter on the Road to Tarascon, August 1888 (destroyed by fire in the Second World War), formerly in the Kaiser-Friedrich-Museum, Magdeburg (Germany)

There has been much scholarly speculation about van Gogh's relations with Jewish artists, including his tutor, Dr. M. B. Mendes da Costa, a Jewish teacher in Amsterdam. The complete number of van Gogh's Jewish collectors is unknown, in part because in the aftermath of the Holocaust the names of Jewish owners were often erased from the ownership history, or provenance, in order to deny or falsify the true origins of artworks and make it difficult to connect the artworks to their former Jewish owners. Databases created to attempt to track the art lost during the Nazi terror include many van Goghs. Some of them have disappeared into private hands. Others have resurfaced in museums or at auctions and have been reclaimed, often in high profile lawsuits, by their former owners.

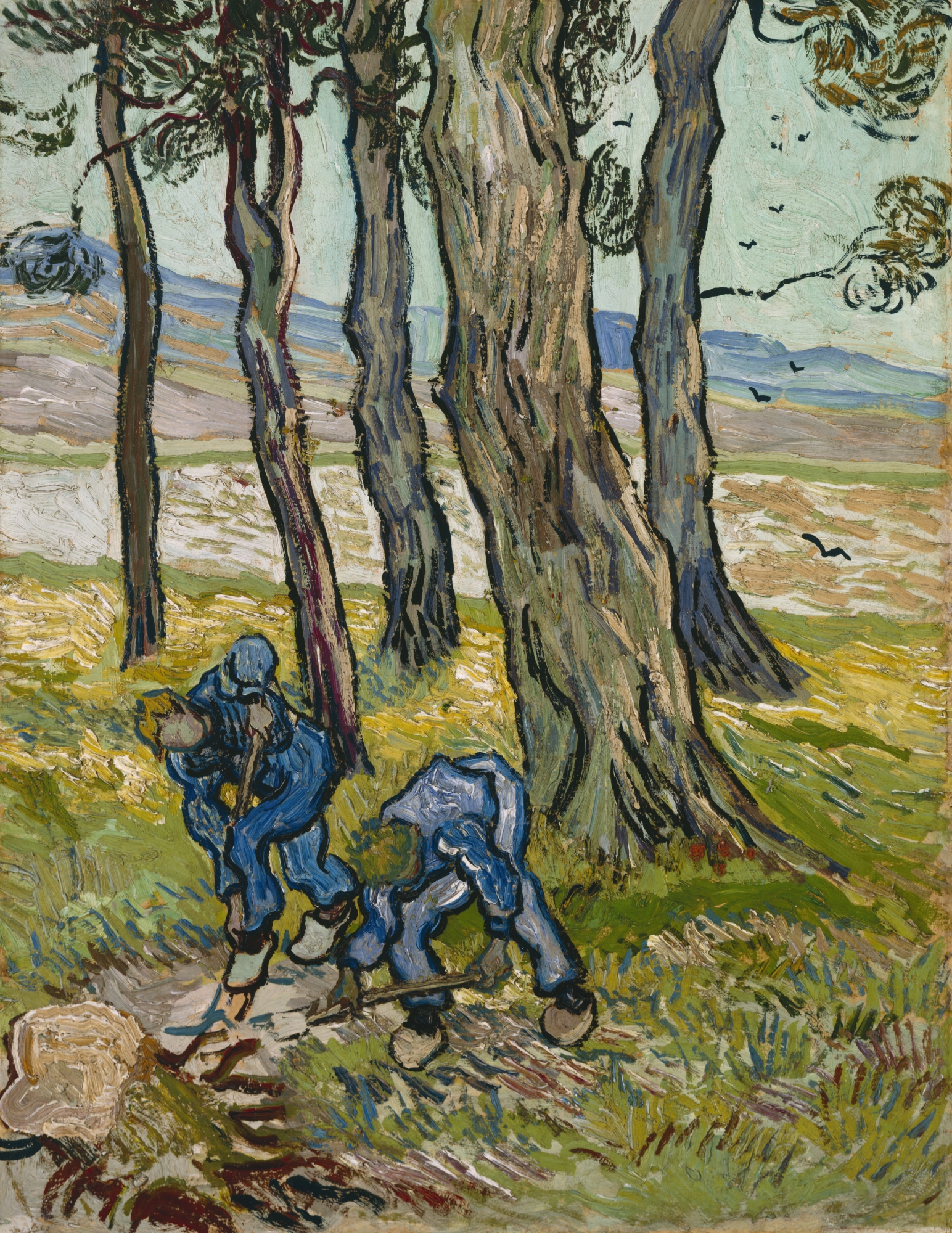
Vincent van Gogh, The Diggers, 1889

In 1999, Germany restituted a van Gogh drawing, L’Olivette, to the only surviving heir of Max Silberberg, a Jewish art collector from Breslau who died in a Nazi concentration camp. Silberberg's 143 piece collection of impressionists, considered one of the finest private collections in Europe, was sold off in "Jew auctions" before he was killed.

In 2006, the Detroit Institute of Arts was faced with a claim for a van Gogh landscape called The Diggers filed by Martha Nathan, originally of Frankfurt, Germany. The museum, which had been gifted the painting by the Detroit collector Robert H. Tannahill, fought the claim, filing a declaratory action in the U.S. District Court in Detroit, requesting to be named as the painting's owner.

In February 2012 an heir of Margarete Mauthner, a German Jew forced into exile, made a claim for Vue des Saintes-Maries-de-la-Mer against the Swiss Oskar Reinhart collection, following an earlier claim for Vue de l'asile et de la Chapelle de Saint-Rémy against the Hollywood movie star Elizabeth Taylor.

Before the Nazis' rise, the Jewish collector Mendelssohn-Bartholdy owned several magnificent van Goghs, including the iconic Sunflowers, a landscape in Provence and Madame Roulin and Her Baby, which is now in the Metropolitan Museum of Art, New York. In December 2022 the heirs of the Mendelssohn-Bartholdy filed a lawsuit against the Japanese Insurance company who owned Sunflowers stating that it had been sold under duress and demanding its restitution.

Van Gogh's Langlois Bridge at Arles (Mu. number 5805) was seized from the Rothschild collection by the Nazis, recovered by the Monuments Men and brought to the Munich Central Collecting Point.

The Artist on the Road to Tarascon (1888), formerly housed in the Kaiser-Friedrich-Museum, in Magdeburg, is believed to have been destroyed by fire during WWII. A drawing Van Gogh made of Starry Night, to show his brother what the painting looked like, emerged in 1992 in the possession of the Russian government.

The painting known as Head of a Man, whose attribution to van Gogh is controversial, belonged to Richard Semmel before Nazi persecution forced him to sell. It ended up at National Gallery of Victoria, against which Semmel's heirs filed a claim in 2013. It was restituted in 2014.

In 2020 Malcolm Gladwell dedicated an episode of his Revisionist History podcast to the story van Gogh's Vase with Carnations, which had been owned by German Jewish art dealers Albert and Hedwig Ullmann, prior to World War II. They sold the van Gogh before fleeing Germany for Australia to escape the Nazis, and the painting eventually arrived at the Detroit Institute of Arts. When the Ullmann family, which had changed its name to Ulin, located the painting, they requested it be returned, but the museum refused. Gladwell is critical of the museum's position, stating "It was impossible to be a German Jew after Kristallnacht and to imagine you were safe".

The ownership of one of van Gogh's most famous works, the iconic Portrait of Dr. Gachet, has been disputed for years, by the family of its former owner, the Dutch collector Franz Koenigs. Though not Jewish, Koenigs fell to his death from a train platform in Cologne in a suspicious event that the family believes was executed by the Nazis.

Dutch Jewish collector Jacques Goudstikker, who died on the boat on which he was fleeing Holland, left behind an inventory of 1,113 paintings, including artwork by van Gogh. He was 42 years old. After Goudstikker's death the powerful Nazi Hermann Goering would in 1940 take over Goudstikker's gallery inventory, in a transaction presented as a purchase. The name of the looted Goudstikker gallery was then used by Goering's art dealer Alois Miedl "to sell thousands of other artworks, many once belonging to Jews."

In November 2021, a Van Gogh painting that had belonged to Max Meirowsky, Meules de blé (1888), sold for $35 million at a Christies' auction after a three party restitution agreement involving the heirs of Max Meirowsky, Alexandrine de Rothschild, and representatives for Cox’s estate.

In 2026, the Blaquier-Arrieta family consigned to Sotheby's Châtaigniers en Fleurs (1890). In the week prior to the sale, the descendants of Samuel Fischer "challenged its sale, arguing that their family had been forced to part with it in Amsterdam in 1936 because of Nazi persecution." The Blaquier-Arrieta family and the Fischer heirs agreed to a confidential settlement days before the sale on 18 November 2026 where it sold for US$190.4 million (including fees) and set a record for Van Gogh.

== German collections ==
Paul Cassirer, a German Jewish art dealer, played a key role in bringing van Gogh artworks to Germany before the war. While French museums owned only three van Goghs before WWII, van Gogh was, according to Felix Krämer, co-curator of the 2019 exhibition Making Van Gogh: A German Love Story, the most popular modern artist in Germany. "By 1914 there were 150 Van Gogh paintings and drawings in Germany, two thirds of which were owned by Jewish collectors." When Hitler came to power in Germany, however, persecution of the Jews began immediately, in 1933. The Jewish art dealer Alfred Flechtheim was put out of business the same year through a process of property seizure known as "Aryanization" or "de-Jewification".

Many German-Jewish art collectors and dealers who did not flee in time were murdered in the Holocaust. Many of these German Jewish art collectors fled to Switzerland, the UK, the Netherlands, or France. When the Nazis invaded the latter two countries, the German Jewish refugees attempted to flee again, this time together with the local Dutch or French Jews. At each stage in the flight, van Goghs previously owned by the Jewish collectors changed hands, either seized by Nazi looting organizations like the E.R.R. or the Dienststelle Muhlmann, or through forced sales, "Jew auctions" or duress sales to finance the flight to safety.

== Databases of van Gogh artworks in the Nazi era ==
In Germany, the German Lost Art Foundation still lists dozens of van Goghs. The French database of objects seized by the Nazi looting organization is known at the E.R.R. references 18 artworks by van Gogh.

In the United States, the Nazi Era Provenance Internet Portal published by the American Alliance of Museums lists 73 works by van Gogh of questionable provenance that entered American museums after 1933. In the UK the Collections Trust Spoliation reports from UK museums lists two van Goghs with provenance to be verified.

== See also ==
- Aryanization
- Art theft and looting during World War II
- Hermann Göring Collection
- Kajetan Mühlmann
- Lippmann, Rosenthal & Co.
- List of works by Vincent van Gogh
- Reichsleiter Rosenberg Taskforce
