= Art theft and looting during World War II =

Nazi art theft

Art theft and looting occurred on a massive scale during World War II. It originated with the policies of the Axis powers, primarily Nazi Germany and the Empire of Japan, which systematically looted occupied territories. Near the end of the war, the Soviet Union, in turn, began looting reclaimed and occupied territories.

== History ==
Although the looting of "cultural heritage" of the German people and private collectors was not permitted in the 1945 agreement of Yalta, following the defeat of Germany by the Allied forces the following goods disappeared: three truckloads of precious art, which was listed in a confiscated list by the US forces (in the Merker mine in Thuringia), and one trainload of 20 wagons loaded with artwork and jewels from Hungary (named the "gold train"). According to a 2001 Der Spiegel article, the artwork is suspected to be in the US and has never been officially declared. The lost artworks from the "Grube Merker," about 450 pictures, are not found in any museum and are thought to have been sold privately.

An attempt by the US to confiscate more German art by requesting 202 precious pictures to be taken was prevented by Walter Farmer on 6 November 1945, an art protection officer in Wiesbaden leading the central art collection store. Although against his direct orders from the US, he assembled 24 colleagues from Germany and Austria and successfully prevented the removal of the pictures (named as operation "Westward Ho"). Before his death in 1997, Farmer was awarded Germany's highest civilian honor, the Commander's Cross of the Order of Merit, for his work in returning the 202 paintings.

In the book Art as Politics in the Third Reich, author Jonathan Petropoulos outlines how there is a need for further cooperation by smaller art galleries to recover art that they may be holding without knowing its ownership. He says that there are still many tens of thousands of pieces of art missing today, but that a more accurate number will require further research.

A large plan was drafted by the Nazis for much of the stolen art to be featured in a so-called Führermuseum, which would display much of the art plundered by the Nazis. This museum would feature works that were not considered to be degenerate art and would instead solely focus on the aesthetics that Hitler considered to be good, and was to be created in the city of Linz. However, this museum was never created, and much of the art that may have been on display there is still missing today. The Nazis were so vehemently against the loss of the art that they had plundered for this museum that there was a plan to destroy a stockpile of art saved for the Führermuseum at the Altaussee salt mines, which held over 12000 pieces of stolen art, using eight 500-kilogram bombs.

Countless pieces of art were stolen during the Holocaust and many were destroyed. The Nazis were relentless in their efforts to get rid of the Jewish people and their culture. Paintings that had been passed down from generation to generation were taken and destroyed. This was extremely emotionally hard for many Jewish families because it was not only an attack on their families and culture but also on their history. There have barely been any efforts of restitution. Many of the families who lost art are simply now left with claims. One of the primary problems encountered by individuals pursuing claims is that it is difficult to locate the necessary documentation on provenance. Organizations with information on a piece's history, museums in particular, often have a disincentive to share information that could assist in an heir's claim.

For organized looting, see:

- Art theft and looting by Nazi Germany
- Art theft and looting by Japan
- Art theft and looting by the Soviet Union

On a smaller scale, art was stolen by individuals from various countries, taking the opportunity of the chaotic war conditions. For example, see:

- Theft of medieval art from Quedlinburg

== Gallery ==
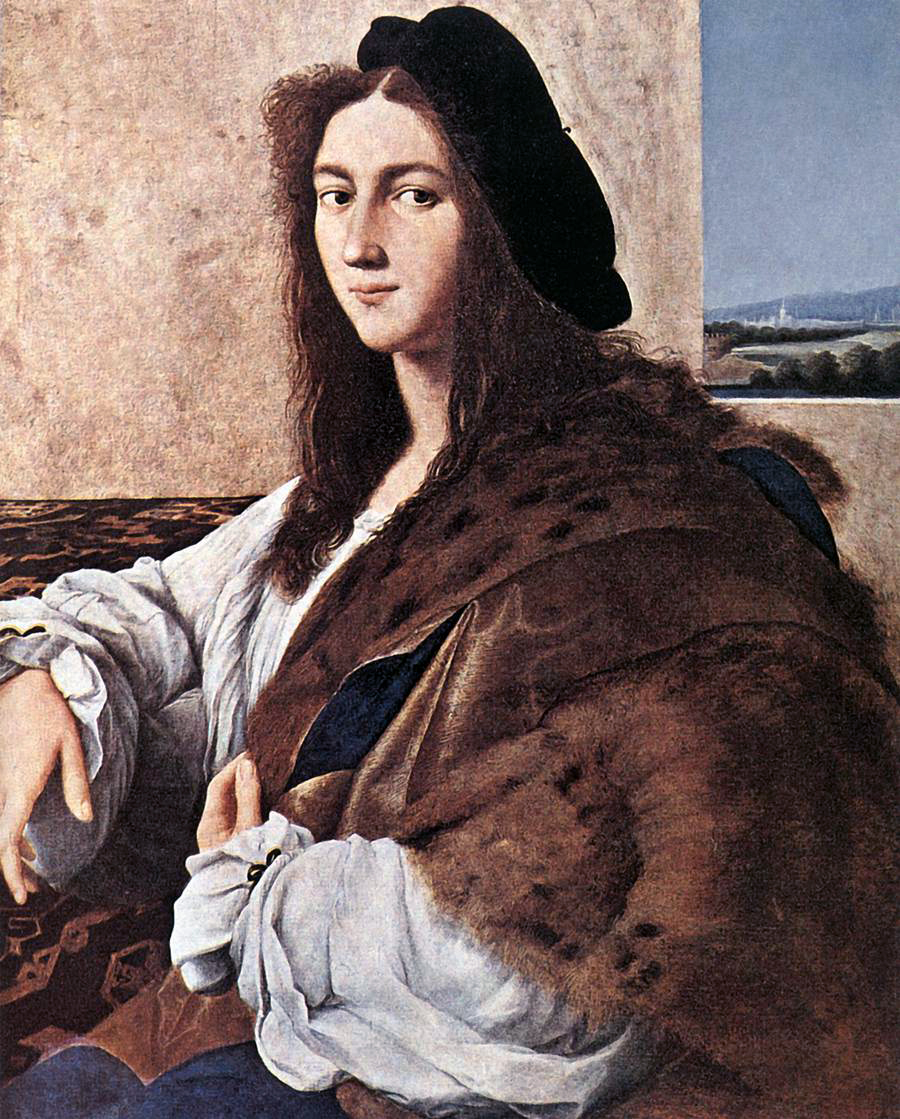
Raphael, Portrait of a Young Man, circa 1513 to 1514. Plundered by the Nazis in Poland. Falsely reported to have been found on 1 August 2012, the location is still unknown.

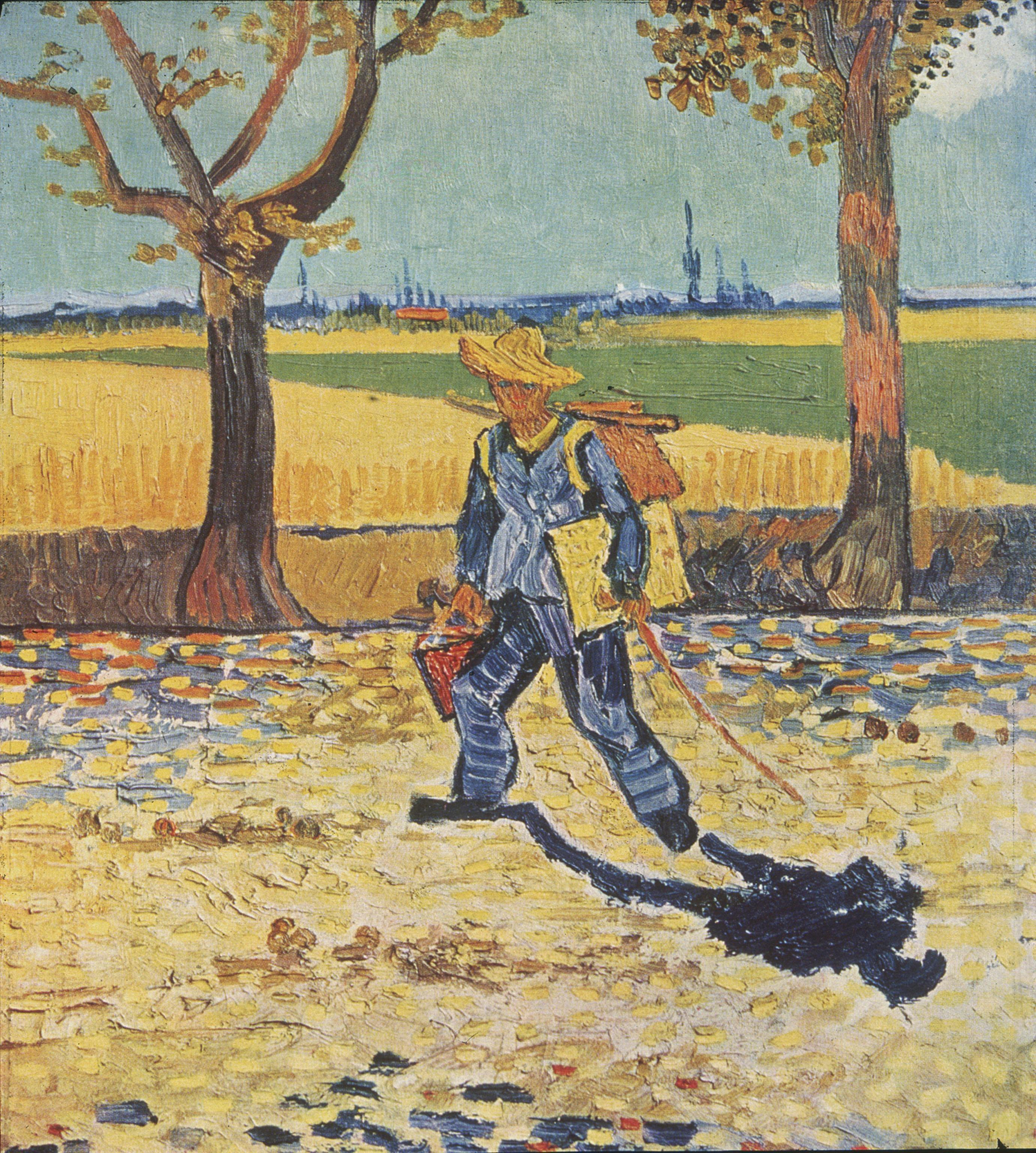
Vincent van Gogh, 1888, The Painter on the Road to Tarascon. Listed as "missing" on Monuments Men Foundation 'Most Wanted' website. Property of Kulturhistorisches Museum in Magdeburg, Germany (formerly the Kaiser-Friedrich Museum).

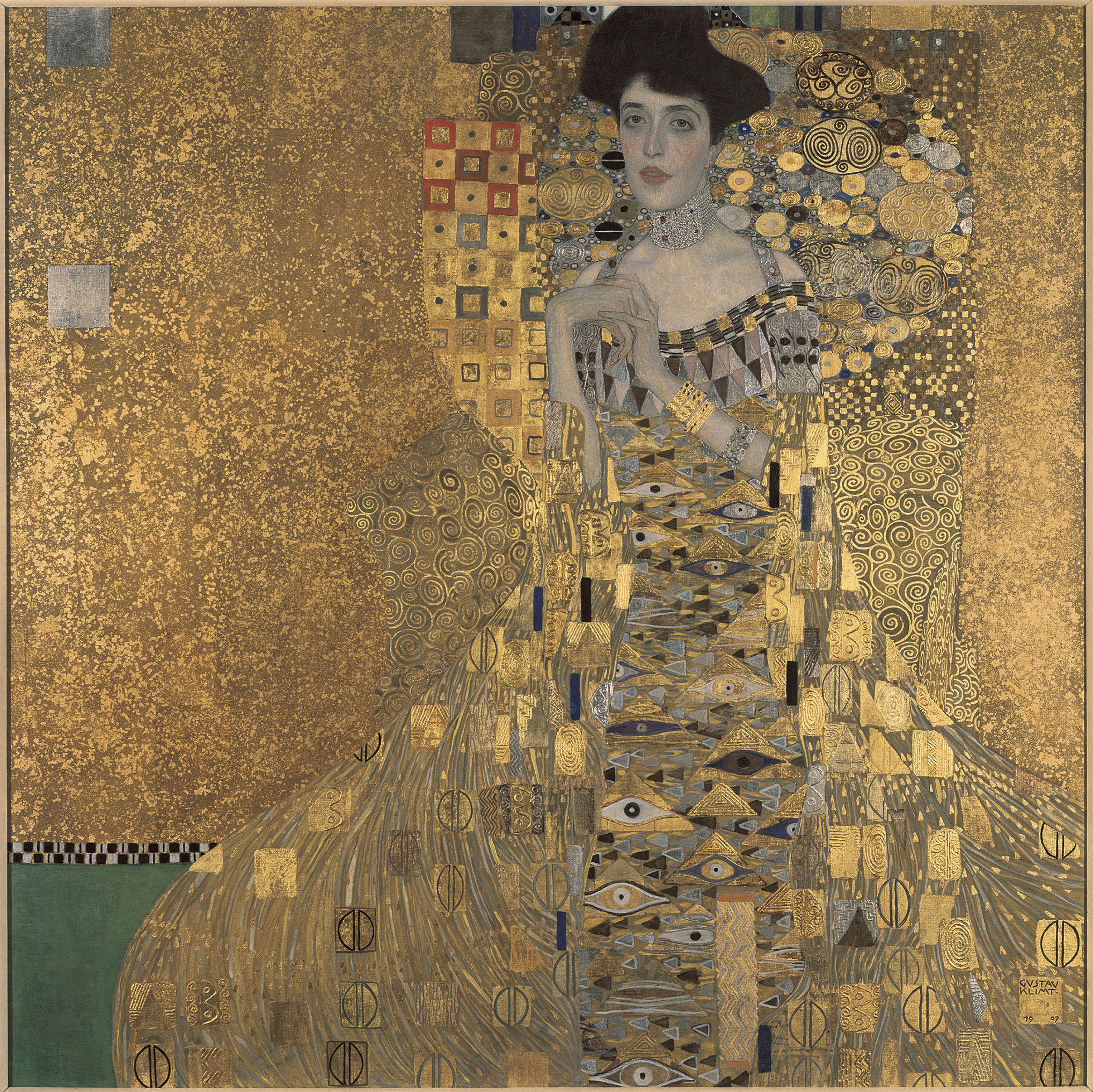
Gustav Klimt, 1907, Portrait of Adele Bloch-Bauer I. Recovered and sold for US$135 million to Ronald Lauder for his Neue Galerie New York in June 2006, which made it at that time the most expensive painting for about 4 months.

Jean Metzinger, 1913, En Canot (Im Boot), oil on canvas, 146 x 114 cm (57.5 in × 44.9 in), exhibited at Moderni Umeni, S.V.U. Mánes, Prague, 1914, acquired in 1916 by Georg Muche at the Galerie Der Sturm, confiscated by the Nazis circa 1936, displayed at the Degenerate Art show in Munich, and missing ever since.

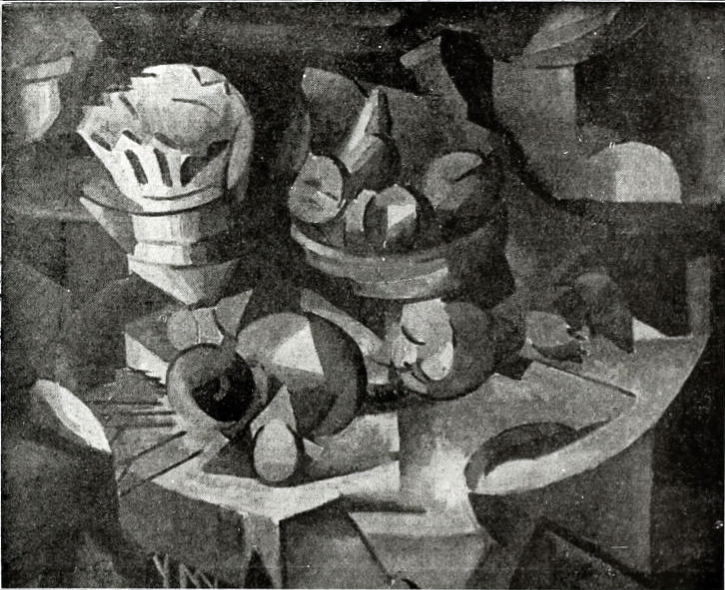
Albert Gleizes, 1911, Stilleben, Nature Morte, Der Sturm postcard, Sammlung Walden, Berlin. Collection Paul Citroen, sold 1928 to Kunstausstellung Der Sturm, requisition by the Nazis in 1937, and missing since.

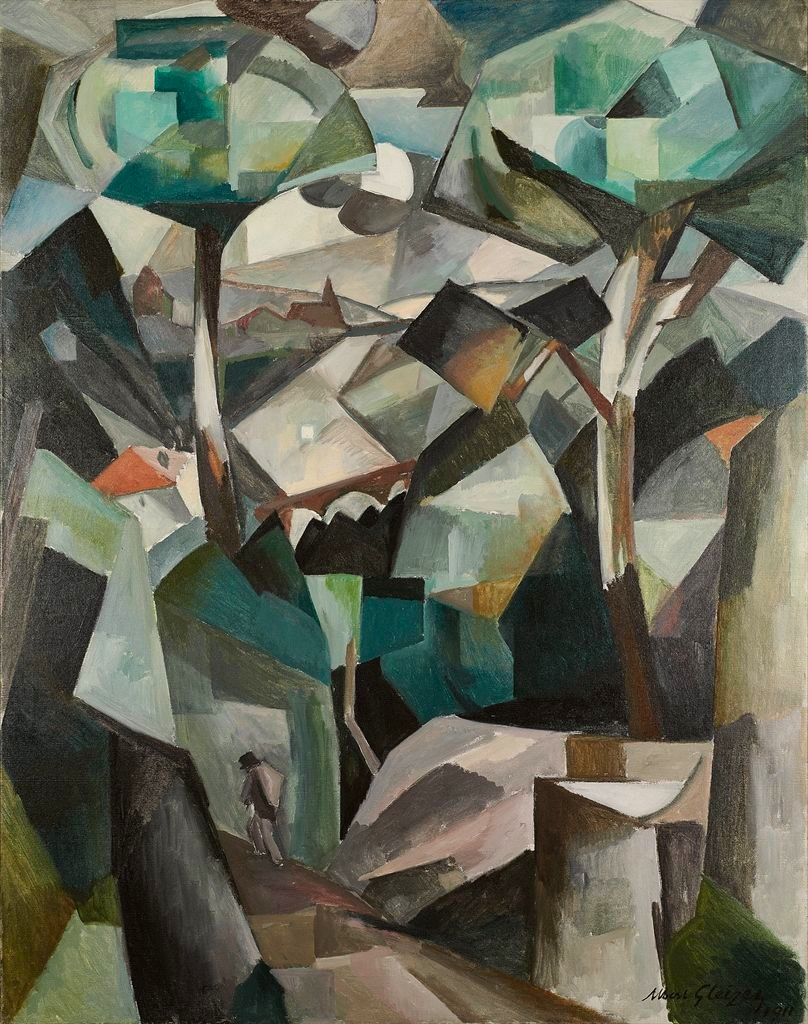
Albert Gleizes, 1911, Le Chemin, Paysage à Meudon, oil on canvas, 146.4 x 114.4 cm. Exhibited at Salon des Indépendants, 1911, Salon des Indépendants, Bruxelles, 1911, Galeries J. Dalmau, Barcelona, 1912, Galerie La Boétie, Salon de La Section d'Or, 1912, stolen by Nazi occupiers from the home of collector Alphonse Kann during World War II, returned to its rightful owners in 1997.

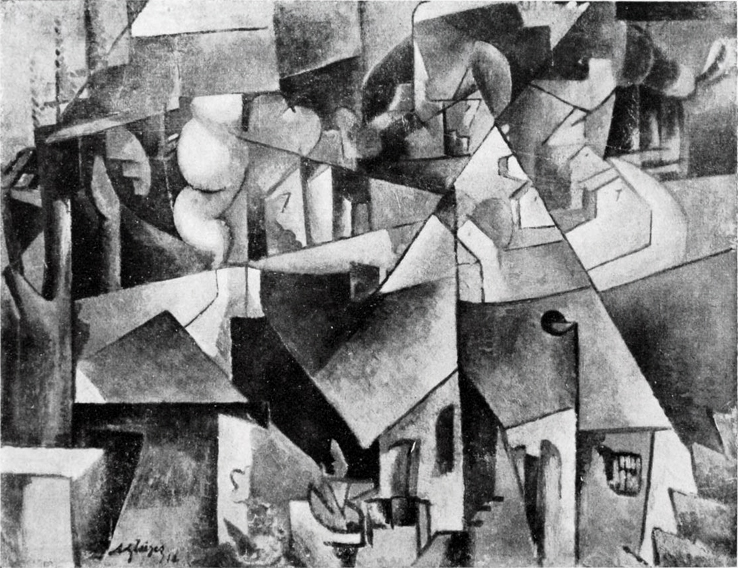
Albert Gleizes, 1912, Landschaft bei Paris, Paysage près de Paris, Paysage de Courbevoie, oil on canvas, 72.8 x 87.1 cm, missing from Hannover since 1937.

== See also ==
- Nazi looting of artworks by Vincent van Gogh
- List of libraries damaged during World War II
- List of missing treasures
- The Rape of Europa
- The Monuments Men 2014 comedy-drama on the theft and recovery of looted art
- M-Aktion
- List of claims for restitution for Nazi-looted art
- Vugesta
- Reichsleiter Rosenberg Taskforce (E.R.R.)
- Aryanization
- The Holocaust
