= Hugo Nathan =

German Jewish art collector (1861–1921)

Hugo Nathan (1861–1921) was a German Jewish banker and art collector.

== Life ==
Born in Frankfurt am Main, Hugo Nathan was a director at the Deutsche Bank in Frankfurt.

He married Martha Adrianna Nathan (born 28 November 1874 in Frankfurt am Main, died 09 Décembre 1958 in Geneva, Switzerland )

Nathan died in 1921, leaving his art collection to his widow.

== Art Collection ==
Nathan collected art. His collection included Dutch art (Josef Israels, "Alte Frau"), German art, with works by Max Liebermann ("Schreitende Bauerné, 1894/95, "Selbstbildnis" 1908, "Reiter am Meeresstrand" 1901, "Schulgang in Laren" 1899,), Wilhelm Trübner ("Kunstpause", "Brustbild einer Frau", "Blick auf Kloster Seon", "Kirchengang im Klster Seeon", "Atelierecke", "Waldinneres", "Vorgang ds Stift Neuburg", "Weg am Buchenwald", "Neustift bei Heidelberg", "Screinerwerkstatt") and Max Slevoft ("Spaziergan"), as well as Swiss art by Ferdinand Hodler (Aussicht vom Thunersee bei Niesen" 1876, "Jungfrau, Mönch und Eiger", "Mönch in Abendbeleuchtung").

In 1912 he purchased Van Gogh's The Diggers. In 1913, he lent artworks to an exhibition at the Kunstverein (July-September) entitled Frankfurter Kunstschatze.

== Family and Nazi persecution ==
When the Nazis came to power in Germany in 1933, Nathan's widow Martha was persecuted because of her Jewish heritage. In January 1937, she fled Germany and moved to Paris, France where she obtained French citizenship. She returned briefly to Germany around May 1938 to sell her house, and was forced by the Nazi government to transfer six paintings remaining in her home to the Staedel Art Institute. She moved to Switzerland around 1939. After the Nazis occupied Paris in 1940, property that she had managed to store there was seized too She had managed, however, to move some paintings to safety Switzerland. The circumstances surrounding the sale of these paintings have been disputed in lawsuits.

== Postwar claims for restitution ==
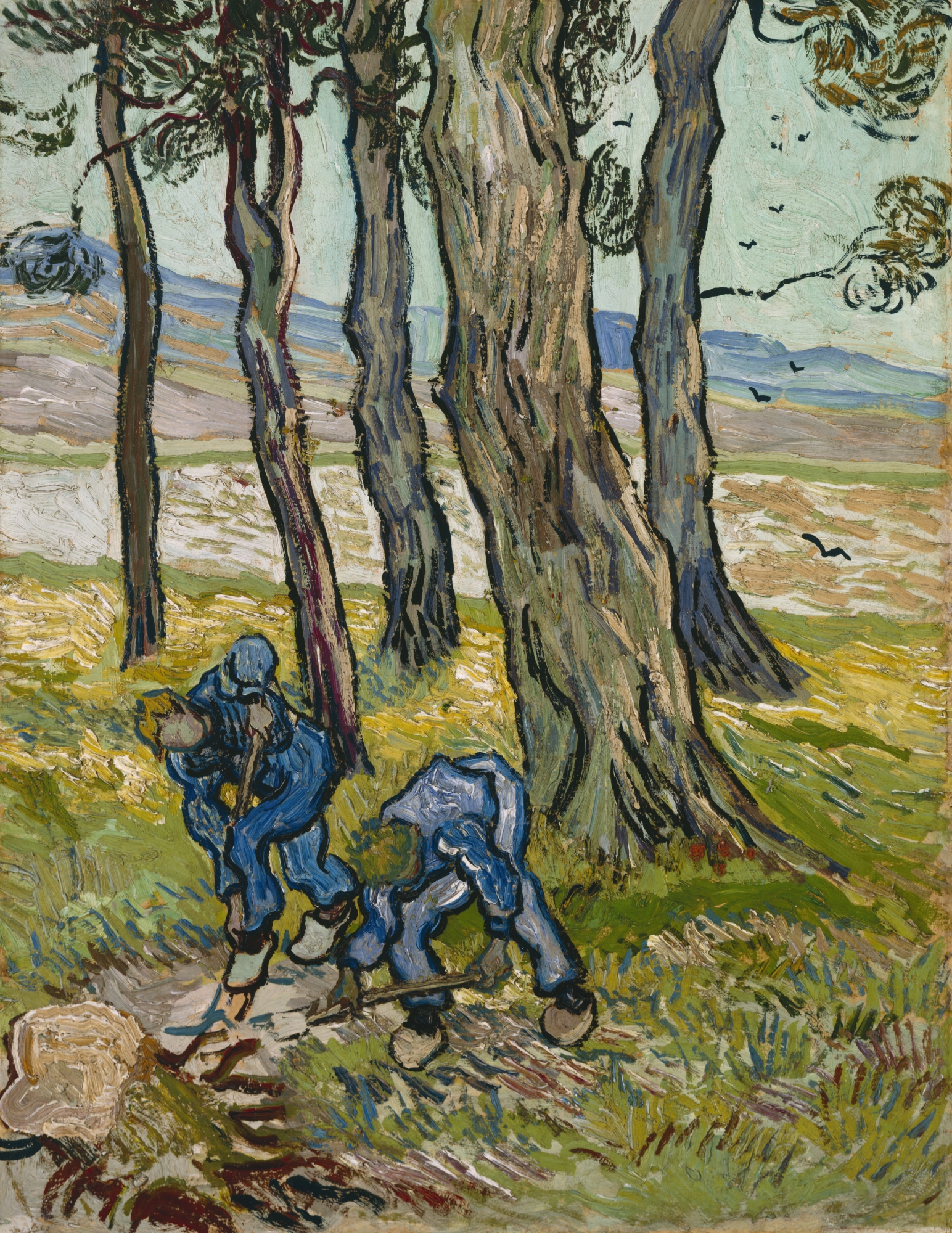
The Diggers, Vincent van Gogh

In May 2004, Nathan's heir contacted the Detroit Institute of Arts after seeing Van Gogh's The Diggers on the museum website. The museum argued that a claim was time barred. Nathan's heirs also contacted the Toledo Museum of Art requesting the return of a Gauguin that she had sold in 1938 to three dealers. The Toledo Museum of Art filed a lawsuit against Nathan's heirs.

In 2013, Simon J. Frankel and Ethan Forrest defended the museums' use of legal tactics such as declaratory judgement against Nathan.

In 2015, the World Jewish Restitution Organization (WJRO) criticized the use of procedural defenses by museums and cited the Nathan case as an example.

The heirs of Hugo and Martha Nathan registered 116 artworks lost to Nazi persecution on the German Lost Art Foundation Lostart database.

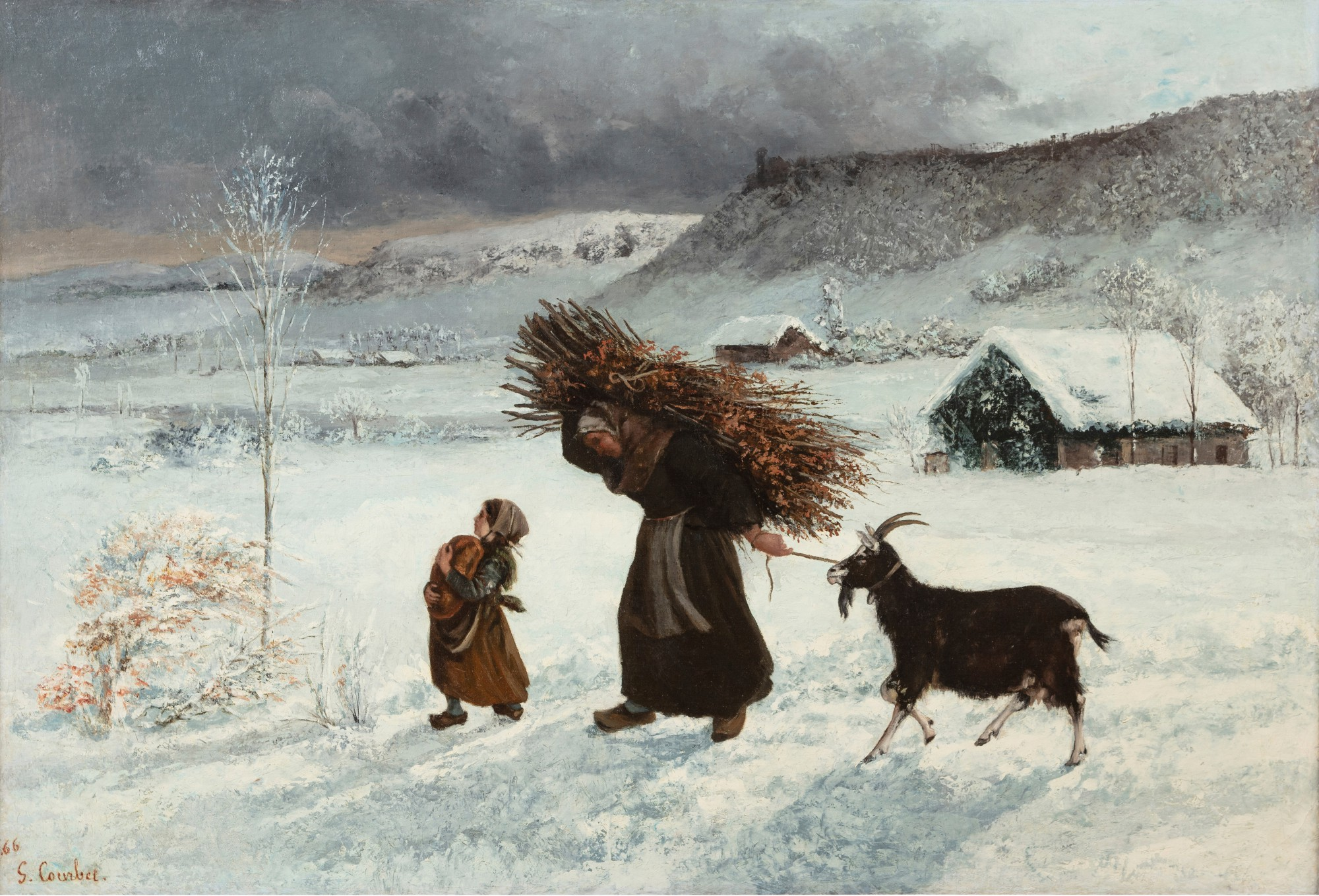
Pauvresse de village (Courbet) Lostart ID 312480

In 2022, La Pauvresse de Village (Die Dorfarme also known as La Femme à la chèvre ou La Fagotière) by Gustav Courbet was the object of a settlement with the family.

In May 2026, following a claim, the SKKG Foundation in Winterthur restituted the painting "Lake Thun with Blüemlisalp and Niesen" by Ferdinand Hodler.

== Lawsuits concerning Hugo and Martha Nathan's art collection ==
Toledo Museum of Art v Claude George Ullin, et al.,

== See also ==
- List of claims for restituiton for Nazi-looted art
- The Holocaust
- Foundation E. G. Bührle
