= The Painter on the Road to Tarascon =

Painting by Vincent van Gogh

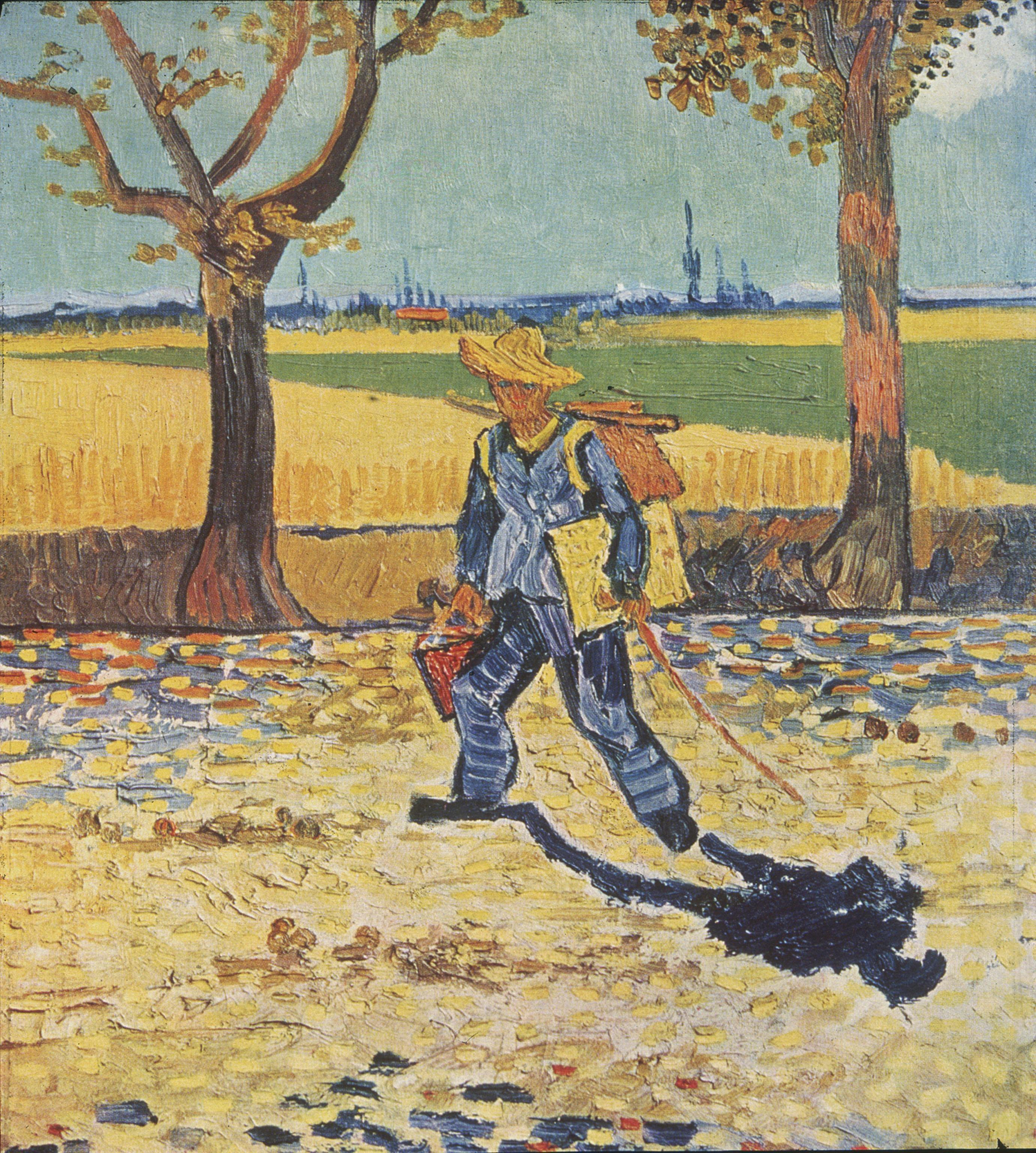
- Artist: Vincent van Gogh
- Year: 1888
- Catalogue: F448; JH1491
- Medium: Oil-on-canvas
- Movement: Post-Impressionism
- Condition: Destroyed in bombing
- Location: Kaiser Fredrich Museum, Stassfurt (until 1945)

The Painter on the Road to Tarascon, also known as Painter on His Way to Work, is an 1888 painting by Vincent van Gogh that is believed to have been destroyed during the Second World War during an air raid in Germany.

== Description ==
The painting depicts the artist on his way to work, and it is thought to be the first self-portrait that van Gogh painted during his time in Arles. On August 13, 1888, Vincent van Gogh wrote to his brother Theo, telling him about a series of recent studies. He mentioned: “For example, there's a quick sketch I made of myself laden with boxes, sticks, a canvas, on the sunny Tarascon road."

== History ==
The painting was purchased by the Kaiser-Friedrich Museum, Germany (now the Kulturhistorisches Museum Magdeburg) in 1912. It was one of the first paintings by van Gogh to enter a public collection. It was photographed in color in the 1930s, an uncommon and costly practice at the time.

During World War II, the collection of the Kaiser-Friedrich Museum was transported to a salt mine in the nearby town of Stassfurt, in order to protect it from Allied bombing. Later, in April 1945, fires broke out at the mine after American forces reached the site. While reports by Monuments Men noted that the contents of the mine had been "entirely reduced to ashes", part of the collection was recovered after the war. Some believe that the fires may have been arson, in order to disguise the looting of the artworks.

The painting is listed as "missing" on the Monuments Men Foundation for the Preservation of Art's website.

== Influence ==
The work has influenced numerous modern artists, serving as an especially important inspiration to Francis Bacon, who produced a series of paintings based on The Painter on the Road to Tarascon in 1956-1957.

== See also ==
- List of works by Vincent van Gogh
- Nazi looting of artworks by Vincent van Gogh
