= The Diggers (Van Gogh) =

1889 painting by Vincent Van Gogh

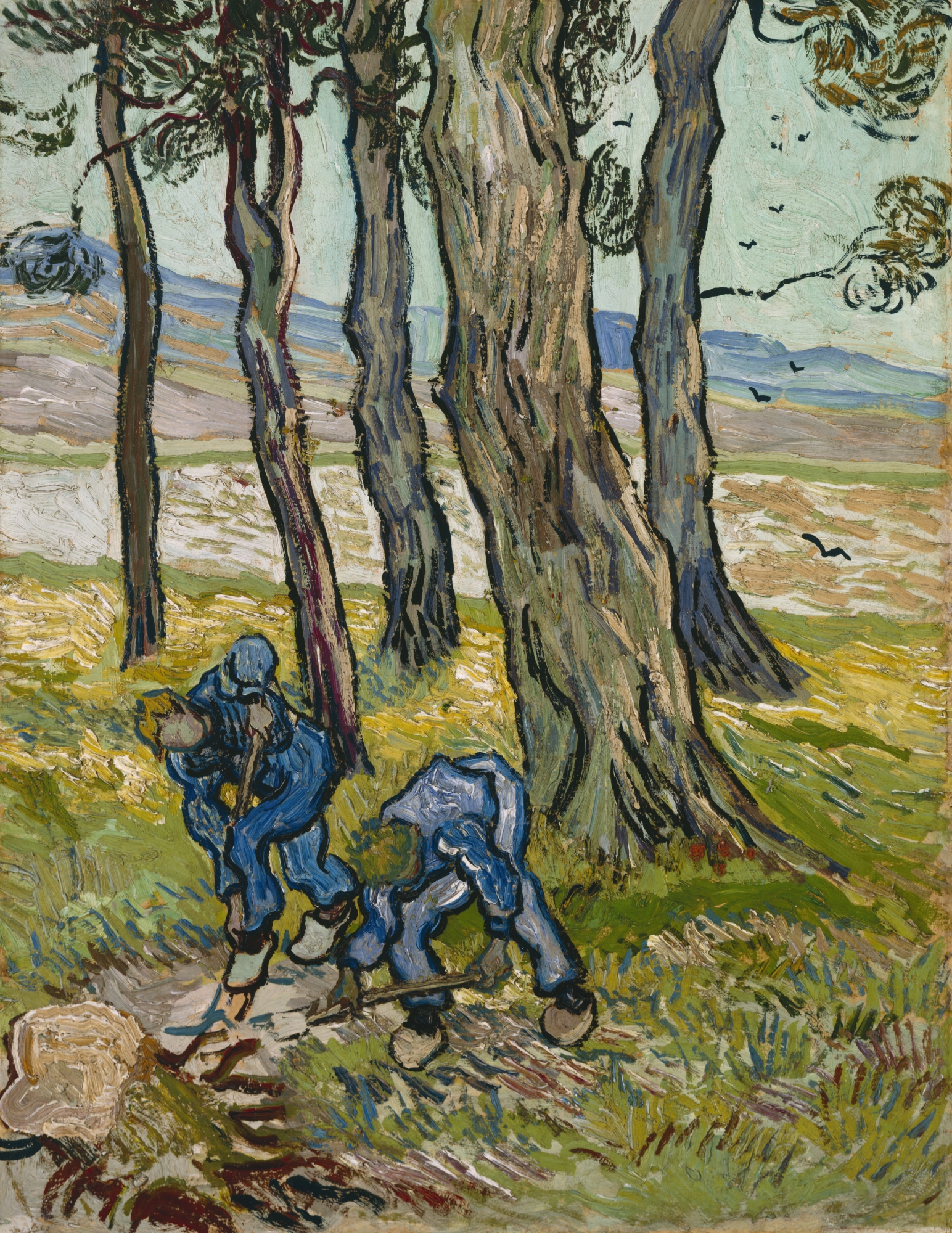
- Artist: Vincent van Gogh
- Year: 1889
- Catalogue: F701; JH1847
- Medium: Oil on canvas
- Dimensions: 65.1 cm × 50.2 cm (25.6 in × 19.8 in)
- Location: Detroit Institute of Arts

The Diggers or Two Diggers is an oil painting by Dutch artist Vincent van Gogh painted in late 1889 in Saint-Rémy-de-Provence, France. It is in the Detroit Institute of Arts (DIA), Detroit, Michigan, United States. The Diggers is sometimes called Two Diggers among Trees (Dutch: Twee Gravers onder Bomen) to distinguish it from The Diggers (after Jean-François Millet), 1889.

== Composition ==
The Diggers depicts two men digging up a tree stump in St. Remy, France. The painting shows Van Gogh's relationship with nature and his admiration of Jean-François Millet's work (Millet painted similar scenes). The painting is considered to be of high quality but not among Van Gogh's most valuable paintings. The painting was valued in 2006 at approximately $10–15 million.

== Provenance ==
Van Gogh painted The Diggers in 1889, shortly before his death, in Saint-Rémy, France. After his death the painting was owned by Van Gogh's sister-in-law, Johanna van Gogh-Bonger. In 1907, it was acquired by Garlerie Bernheim-Jeune in Paris and then by Frankfurter Kunstverein in 1909. The Diggers was purchased in 1912 by Hugo Nathan, a prominent art collector in Frankfurt, and his wife Martha (Dreyfus) Nathan, and inherited by Martha upon her husband's death in 1922.

In 1938, Nathan sold the painting for $9,364 to a consortium of dealers – Justin Thannhauser, Alex Ball, and Georges Wildenstein – who, in turn, sold it to Detroit collector Robert H. Tannahill in 1941 for $34,000. Tannahill donated the painting, along with over 450 other works of art, to the Detroit Institute of Arts, and the museum took possession upon Tannahill's death in 1970.

=== Controversy over ownership ===
In May 2004, 15 heirs of Martha Nathan, contacted the Detroit Institute of Arts after seeing Van Gogh's The Diggers on the museum website. The heirs said that they believed the paintings belonged to the family of Martha Nathan, a German Jew, who had been forced to sell the painting (along with Gauguin's Street Scene in Tahiti, owned by the Toledo Museum of Art) under duress due to persecution by the Nazis.

The museum hired an art provenance specialist Laurie Stein to carry out a detailed study of the painting's provenance which she completed in 2006. According to Stein, Nathan had moved The Diggers to Basel, Switzerland, in 1930, three years before the Nazis came to power. When she left Germany for Paris in 1937, she had paid all applicable exit taxes, without having to sell the painting. Nathan sold The Diggers in 1938 for a price that was consistent with prices of comparable works sold voluntarily in Europe at the time. After the war, when Nathan sought compensation for property sold under duress, The Diggers was not included in the claim. Although the painting was publicly exhibited by the museum with acknowledgment of Nathan's prior ownership, no restitution claim was made by the heirs until 2004.

The museum brought a declaratory action for quiet title action against the heirs of Martha Nathan and in 2007 the court ruled against the Nathan heirs and in favor of the museum. In subsequent court action the case was dismissed based on a technicality related to time limits.

The museum's tactics were criticized by numerous organizations. The World Jewish Restitution Organization stated that the museum had used a statute of limitations defense even though it had adopted the American Museum Guidelines, set by the American Alliance of Museums, which call for restitution claims to be decided on merit. In a rare bipartisan action in 2016, Congress passed the Holocaust Expropriated Art Recovery (HEAR) Act of 2016, specifically to put an end to such tactics.

The museum states that the use of the statute of limitations was a last resort after spending $500,000 on researching the painting's provenance, yet failing to reach agreement with the heirs. Several historians have pointed out that the case against Detroit Institute of Arts is weak compared to other art restitution cases. According to Jonathan Petropoulos, the author of The Faustian Bargain: The Art World in Nazi Germany, "The fact that [Nathan] was able to transport [the painting] to Switzerland, let alone that she did so in 1930, almost three years before Hitler came to power, means that she had freedom of action with regards to the disposition of the works." Similarly, Sidney Bolkosky at University of Michigan-Dearborn stated that while Nathan rightfully received restitution for property seized by the Nazis, the painting was never stolen and it was sold outside of Nazi control.

== See also ==
- List of works by Vincent van Gogh
