= Robert Hudson Tannahill =

American art collector (1893–1969)

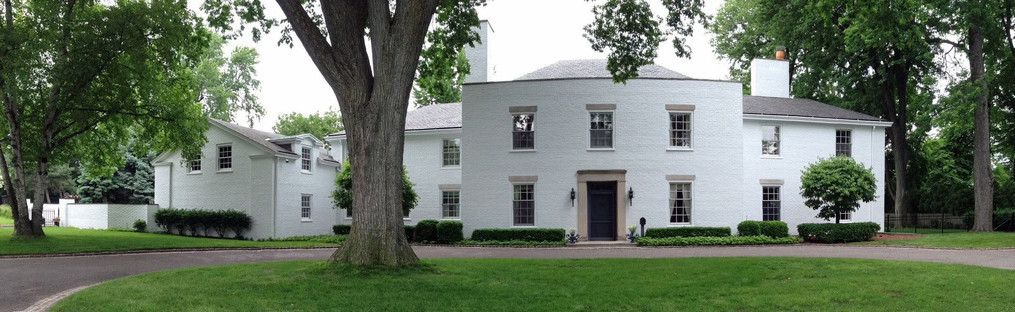
One time home of Robert Hudson Tannahill in Grosse Pointe Farms, Michigan

Robert Hudson Tannahill (April 1, 1893 – September 25, 1969) was a Detroit art collector and benefactor.

== Early life ==
Tannahill was a nephew of department store magnate Joseph Lowthian Hudson and a cousin of Eleanor Clay Ford, wife of Henry Ford's only son Edsel. He was the only son of Robert Blyth Tannahill and Anna Elizabeth Hudson. His father, Robert Blyth Tannahill (born in Detroit in 1863), joined J. L. Hudson in the retail trade in 1889; he married Anna Elizabeth Hudson, one of three sisters of J. L. Hudson. By 1900, he served as vice-president of the successful J. L. Hudson Department Store. Robert Hudson Tannahill was born and grew up in the William Van Moore/Robert Blyth Tannahill Home, located at 67 Peterboro in the Peterboro-Charlotte Historic District in Midtown Detroit, built in 1882.

== Art Collector ==
Tannahill donated 475 works of art and $550,000 in cash to the Detroit Institute of Arts (DIA) during his lifetime. Upon his death, the museum received an additional 557 bequeathed to it, valued at approximately $13,000,000. His total gifts constitute a significant portion of the DIA's permanent collection. One of the paintings he bequeathed, The Diggers by Vincent Van Gogh, was the subject of a restitution claim by the heirs of Martha Nathan, who had owned the painting before fleeing Nazi Germany. The DIA hired provenance researchers to conduct an 18-month study into the history of the painting, which Tannahill had acquired in 1941. When the researchers concluded that the Van Gogh had not been looted by Nazis, the DIA's legal team filed a "quiet title" lawsuit against the heirs. The museum successfully invoked a statute of limitations and retained custody of the painting.

Tannahill served as a member of the City of Detroit Arts Commission from 1930 to 1962 and was instrumental in establishing the Detroit Artists Market. His collection focused on 19th- and 20th-century artists including Paul Cézanne, Jean-Baptiste-Camille Corot, Edgar Degas, Paul Gauguin, Juan Gris, Paul Klee, John Marin, Henri Matisse, Amedeo Modigliani, Claude Monet, Georgia O'Keeffe, Pierre-Auguste Renoir, Georges Rouault and Georges Seurat. His collection also included a significant number of African sculptures.
