= Madame Roulin and Her Baby =

1888 painting by Vincent van Gogh

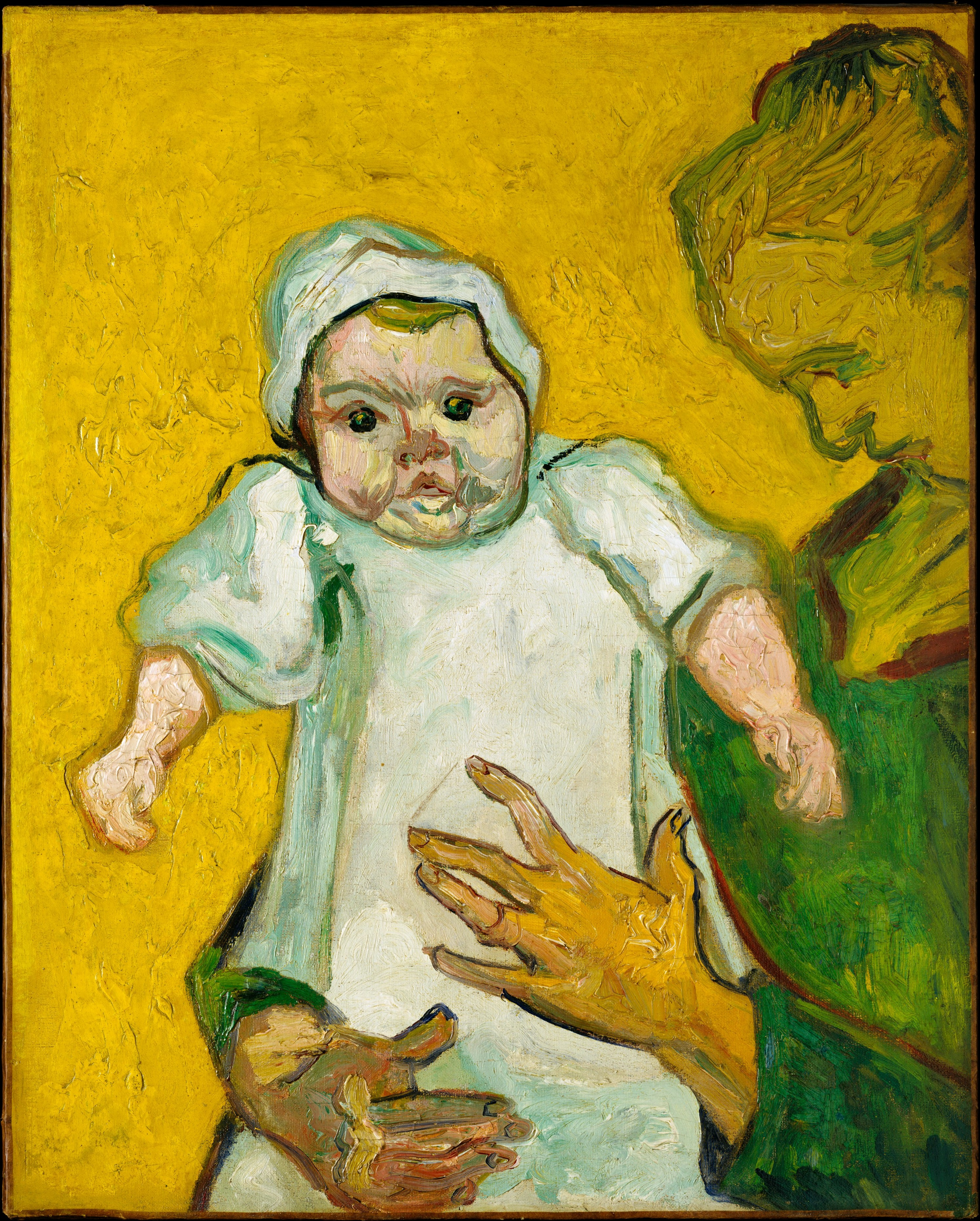
- Artist: Vincent van Gogh
- Year: 1888
- Catalogue: F491; JH1638
- Medium: Oil on canvas
- Subject: Augustine and Marcelle Roulin
- Dimensions: 63.5 cm × 50.8 cm (25.0 in × 20.0 in)
- Location: Metropolitan Museum of Art; New York City
- Accession: 1975.1.231

Madame Roulin and Her Baby is an 1888 painting by Vincent van Gogh. Done in oil on canvas, the painting depicts Augustine and Marcelle Roulin, the later of whom was an infant. The Roulin family became acquaintances of van Gogh after the family's patriarch, postman Joseph Roulin, met Van Gogh following the artist's relocation to the town of Arles. The painting is in the collection of the Metropolitan Museum of Art.

== Description ==
The painting was produced by Van Gogh six months after the artist moved from Paris to the town of Arles. In town, Van Gogh became acquainted with Joseph Roulin, a local postman, and would go on to render multiple paintings of the Roulin family; this series of works in commonly referred to as The Roulin Family.

Madame Roulin and Her Baby is one of several works by Van Gogh that depict the infant Marcelle Roulin. One source names the painting as featuring Marcelle when she was three months old. The Metropolitan Museum of Art's profile of the work describes the painting as being "vigorously painted", with thick brush strokes being used to capture the infant's expression.

== See also ==
- List of works by Vincent van Gogh
