= Roosevelt Room =

Meeting room in the U.S. White House

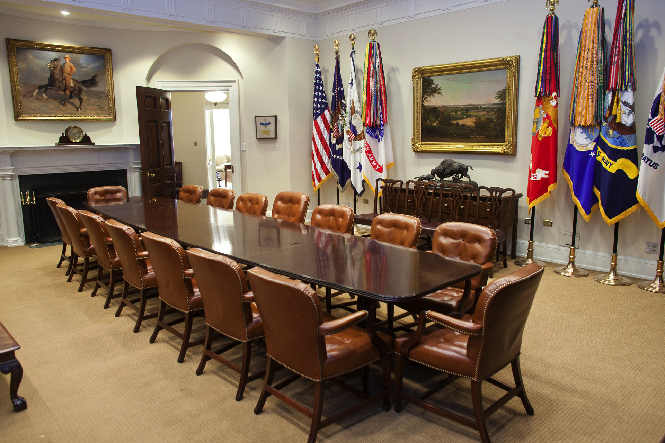
- The Roosevelt Room in the West Wing of the White House during the Obama administration
- Building: West Wing, White House
- Location: Washington, D.C.
- Country: United States
- Coordinates: 38.8974°N 77.0376°W
- Purpose: Meeting room
- Named for: Theodore Roosevelt and Franklin D. Roosevelt
- Architect: Charles Follen McKim

The Roosevelt Room's location in the West Wing

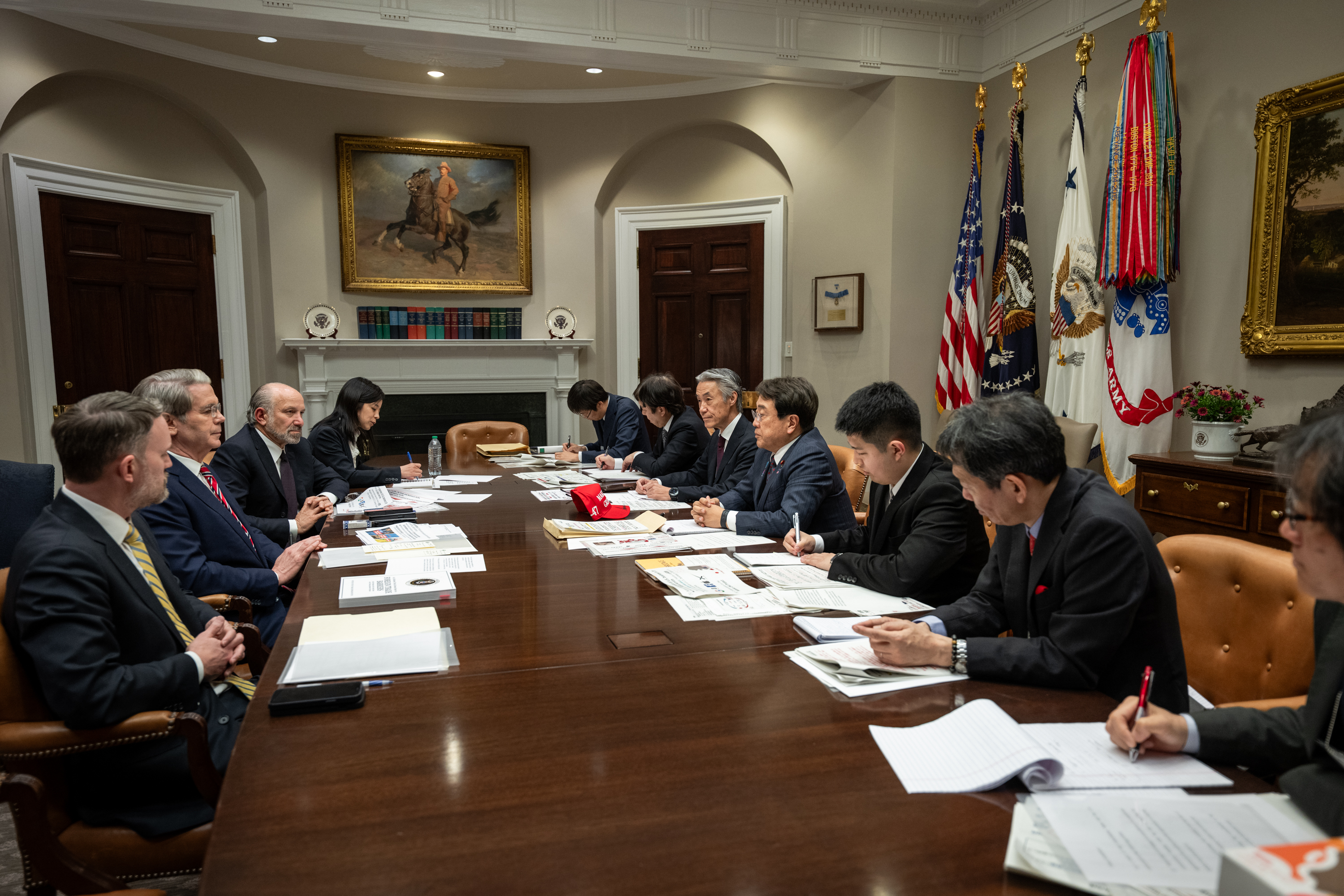
A Trump administration meeting in the Roosevelt Room in April 2025

The Roosevelt Room is a meeting room in the West Wing of the White House, the residence of the president of the United States, in Washington, D.C. Located in the center of the wing, across the hall from the Oval Office, it is named after two related U.S. presidents, Theodore Roosevelt and Franklin D. Roosevelt, who were both major contributors to the West Wing. The room is commonly used for staff meetings and to announce the appointment or nomination of new staff members.

== History ==
=== Early construction and design (1902) ===
In 1902, Congress passed an appropriations bill that, in addition to repairs and refurnishing, called for the construction of a temporary office building west of the White House. This led to the removal of government offices from the East Wing and allocated extra space for additional rooms. Theodore Roosevelt hired Beaux-Arts architect Charles Follen McKim of the New York architectural firm McKim, Mead & White to both rearrange, redecorate, and refurnish the interior of the White House and also to build a discreet office structure on the west. The original structure, some of which is still extant in the present West Wing, was originally intended to be temporary.

=== Subsequent modifications ===
Roosevelt's successor, William Howard Taft, in addition to expanding the office wing, constructed the Oval Office, leaving the space previously occupied by the president's desk freely available. However, despite a fire breaking out in the West Wing on Christmas Eve 1929 during the Hoover administration, instead of expanding the West Wing as planned, Hoover elected to have the building reconstructed and repaired to avoid public criticism in light of the recent stock market crash. In 1933, early in the Franklin Roosevelt administration, the new president began a series of meetings with staff architect Eric Gugler to enlarge and modify the West Wing as planned previously by his predecessor. When Franklin Roosevelt relocated the Oval Office in 1934, this windowless room received a skylight; while it was initially lit with sunlight from an installed shaft, this would later be replicated in August 1988 with fluorescent light.

== Decorations ==
=== The "Fish Room" ===
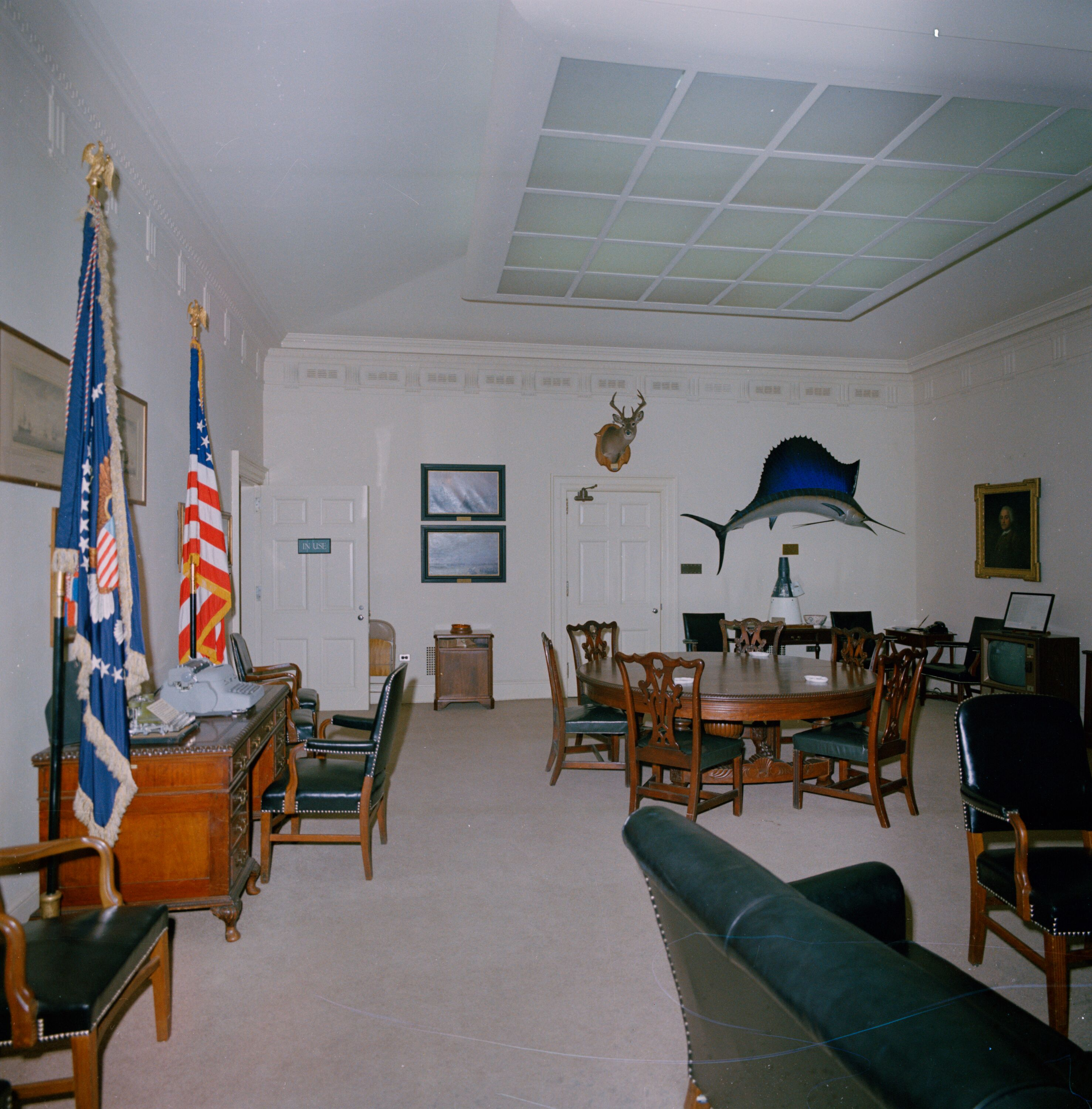
The "Fish Room" during the Kennedy administration (1963)

Franklin Roosevelt referred to the leftover windowless space as the "Fish Room" and used it to store his fishing trophies as well as a tropical fish aquarium. His successors, Presidents Truman, Eisenhower, and Kennedy reportedly disliked this name, with Eisenhower preferring to call it "that room over there". Continuing the fish theme, President Kennedy hung a mounted sailfish he had caught in Acapulco on his honeymoon.

=== Nixon's 1969 rededication to Roosevelts ===
On March 12, 1969, President Nixon gave the room its current name, the Roosevelt Room, to honor Theodore Roosevelt who started the West Wing and Franklin D. Roosevelt who enlarged it to its current size. Portraits and mementos of both Roosevelts were placed in the room. The room prominently displays Theodore Roosevelt's 1906 Nobel Peace Prize for his efforts to end the Russo-Japanese War and his posthumous 2001 Medal of Honor.

Continuing in Nixon's direction, it is a tradition to display memorabilia and portraits of both Roosevelt presidents. Often, Alfred Jonniaux's Portrait Painting of Franklin D. Roosevelt (1958) and Theodore Roosevelt's equestrian portrait by Tade Styka titled Rough Rider (c. 1909) will be displayed prominently in the room. It also displays cast bronze bas-relief plaques depicting profile busts of Theodore Roosevelt by James Earle Fraser and Franklin D. Roosevelt by John M. DeStefano.

A number of other paintings are also often on display in the room, such as Crossing the River Platte (c.1871) by Worthington Whittredge and View of the City of Washington from the Virginia Shore (1858) by William Macleod. President Reagan displayed Looking Up The Yosemite Valley by Albert Bierstadt, on loan from the Haggin Museum.

The east wall of the room is a half circle, with a centered fireplace and doors on either side. The room has no windows and is lit by a false skylight. A large conference table seating a maximum of 16 is located in the center. The room is painted a buff color with white trim. A triglyph molding, similar to that found in Independence Hall, encircles the room. The furniture is mostly 20th-century reproductions of Chippendale and Queen Anne style furniture.

The south wall is lined by a flag of the United States and flags representing the president, the vice president, and those representing the U.S. Armed Forces with campaign streamers attached.

In August 2017, President Trump undertook a major renovation of the West Wing; while initially only intending to make repairs and upgrades to the HVAC and IT systems, additional work on the interior paint and carpet was completed. Consequently, the beige Obama-era carpet of the Roosevelt Room was replaced with a more detailed gray and white geometric design, and two large, golden eagles purchased from a Maryland antique shop by a GSA West Wing historian were placed upon pedestals.

== Usage ==
The space occupied by what is now the Roosevelt Room exists in the location of Theodore Roosevelt's first West Wing office and a corresponding anteroom. When Taft instead moved to the Oval Office, the space became a waiting room. After Franklin Roosevelt's 1934 remodeling, he assigned it its current role as a centrally located conference room across the newly repositioned Oval Office, delegating the room for National Security Council meetings or as a holding room for distinguished visitors to the president.

Kennedy used the room as a spillover space for small meetings and other gatherings.

His successor, President Johnson, declaring the space "Presidential Reception Room", used the room for radio and television broadcasting. In 1965, a proposal by ABC, CBS, and NBC to set up permanent television and radio equipment for broadcasting was under consideration by the Johnson administration. However, the plan fell through since the room was considered too small. In 1969, Nixon would assign this purpose to a newly constructed room in the West Wing: James S. Brady Press Briefing Room.

After his rededication as the Roosevelt Room, President Nixon used it as a space for members of Congress and other important callers.

The Roosevelt Room continues to be used for staff meetings and has increasingly been used to announce the appointment or nomination of new staff members. Unlike the rest of the West Wing, it does not exist for some specialized purpose but serves a more general role as a room for presidential activities fully equipped for teleconferencing. The room is used as a preparation room by large delegations meeting with the president, before entering the Oval Office.

== Gallery ==
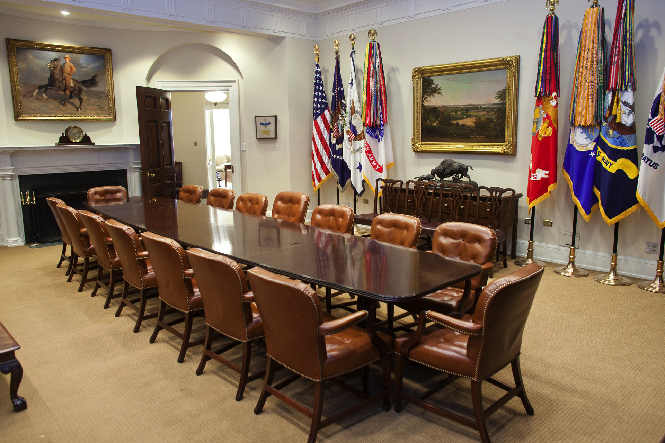
A view of the Roosevelt Room during the Obama administration (2009)

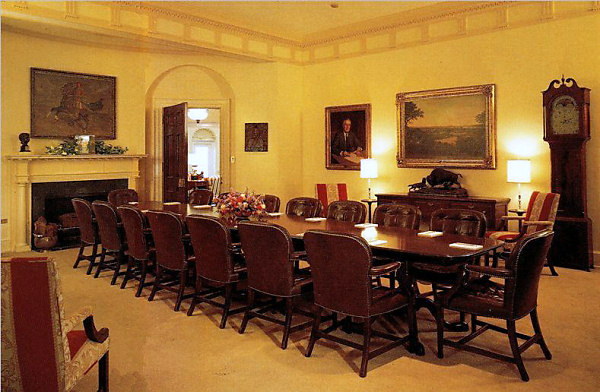
A view of the Roosevelt Room during the Clinton administration (c.1995)

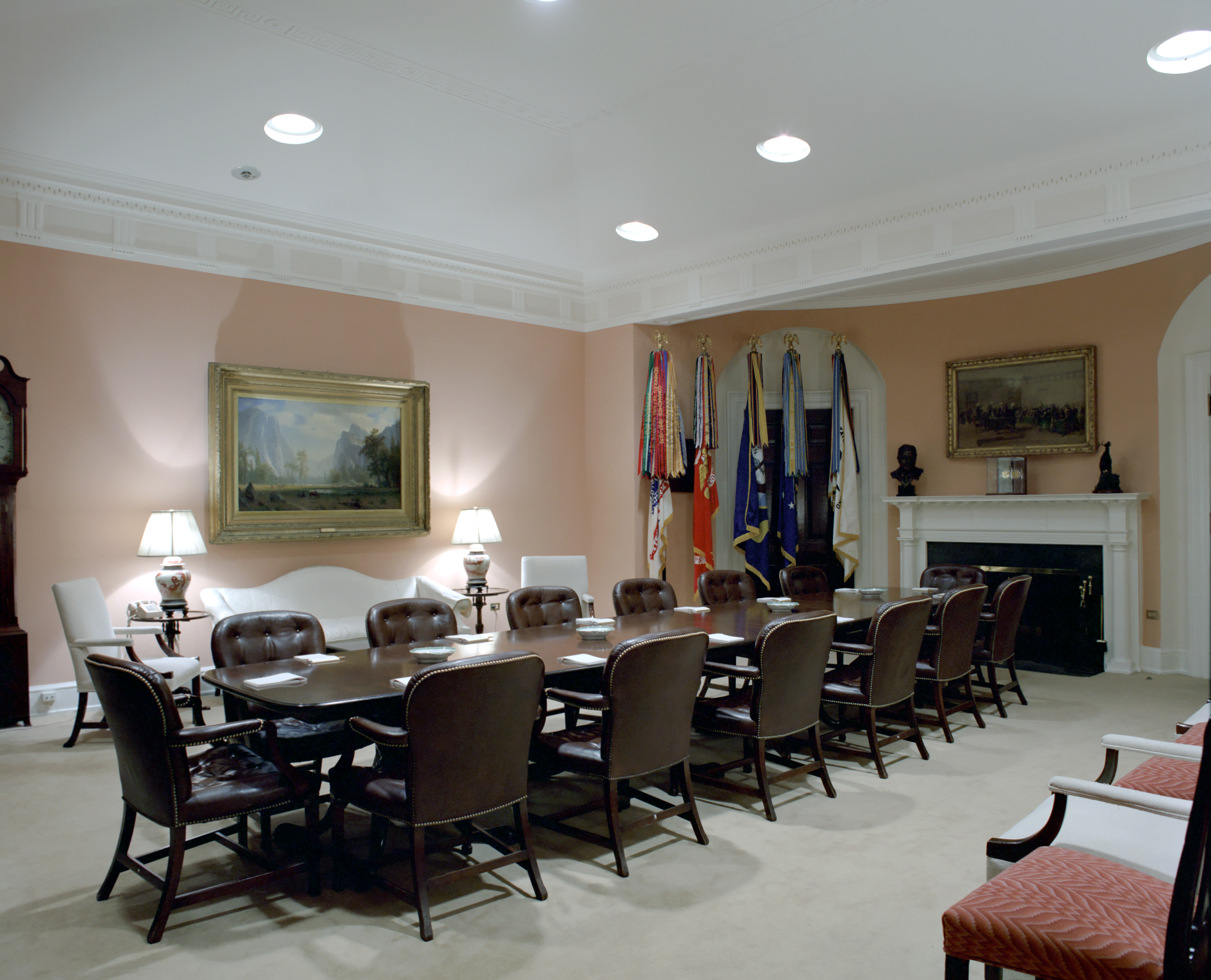
A view of the Roosevelt Room during the Reagan administration (1983)

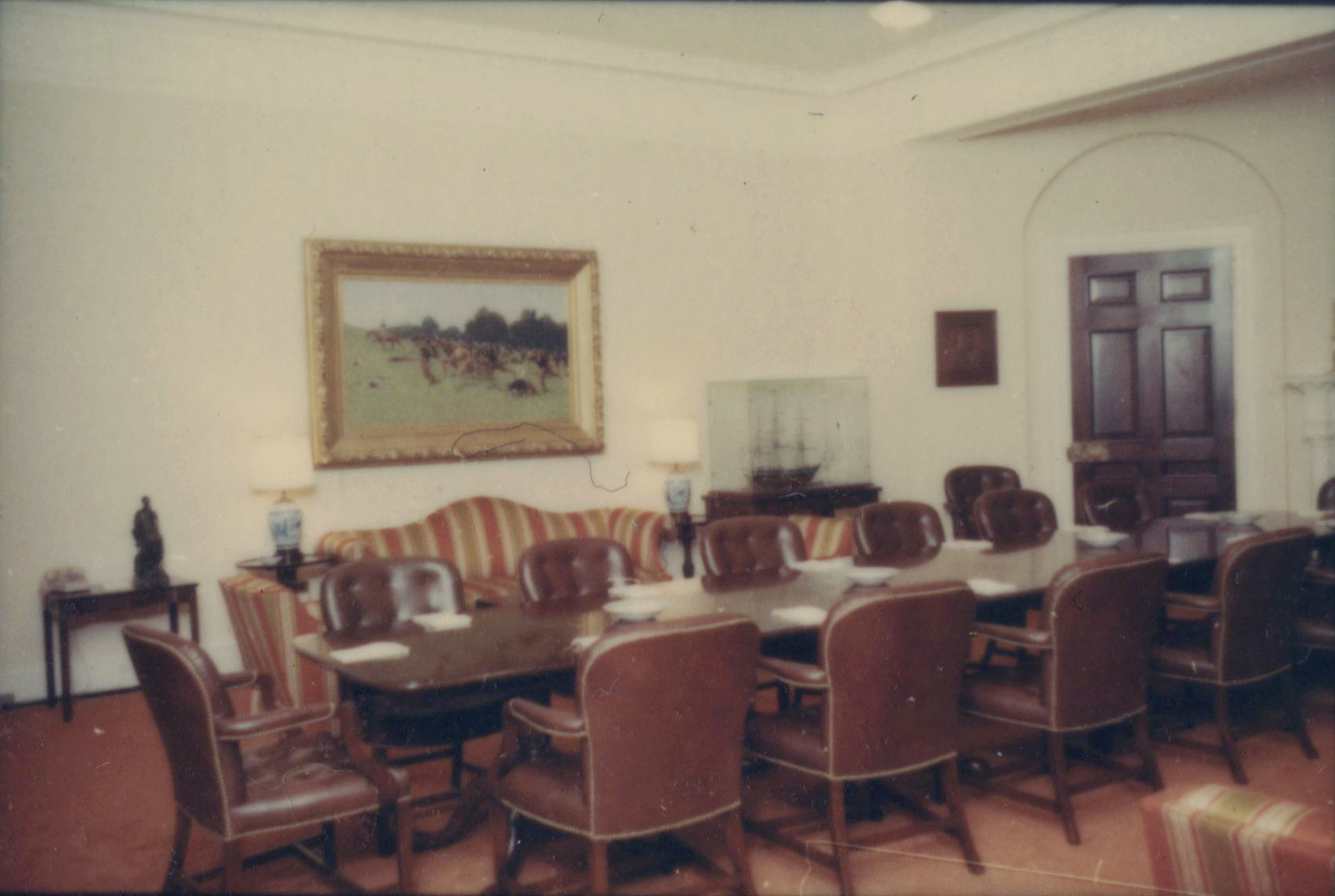
A view of the newly-renamed Roosevelt Room during the Nixon administration (1971)

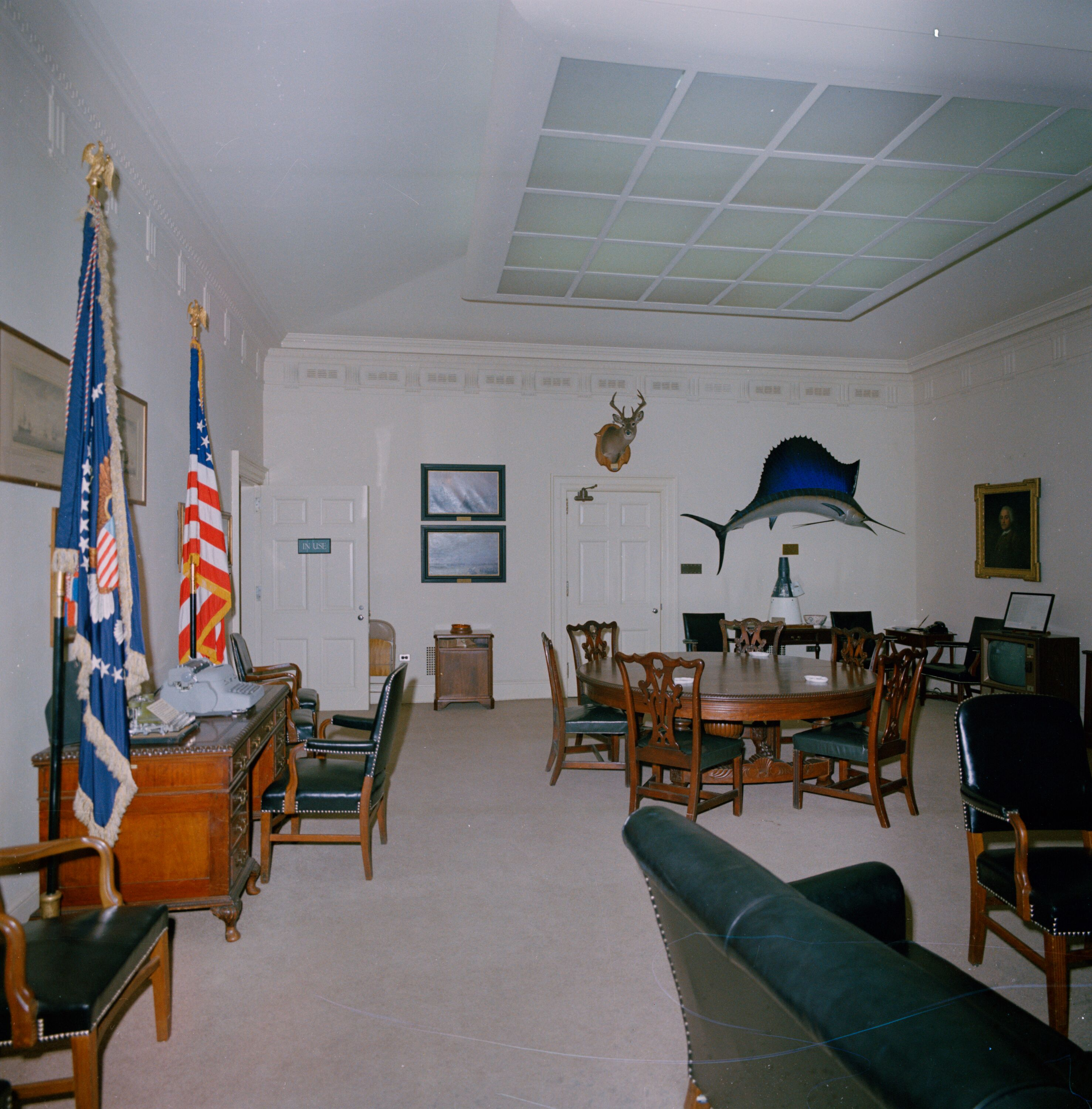
A view of the Roosevelt Room (then-named "Fish Room") during the Kennedy administration (1963)

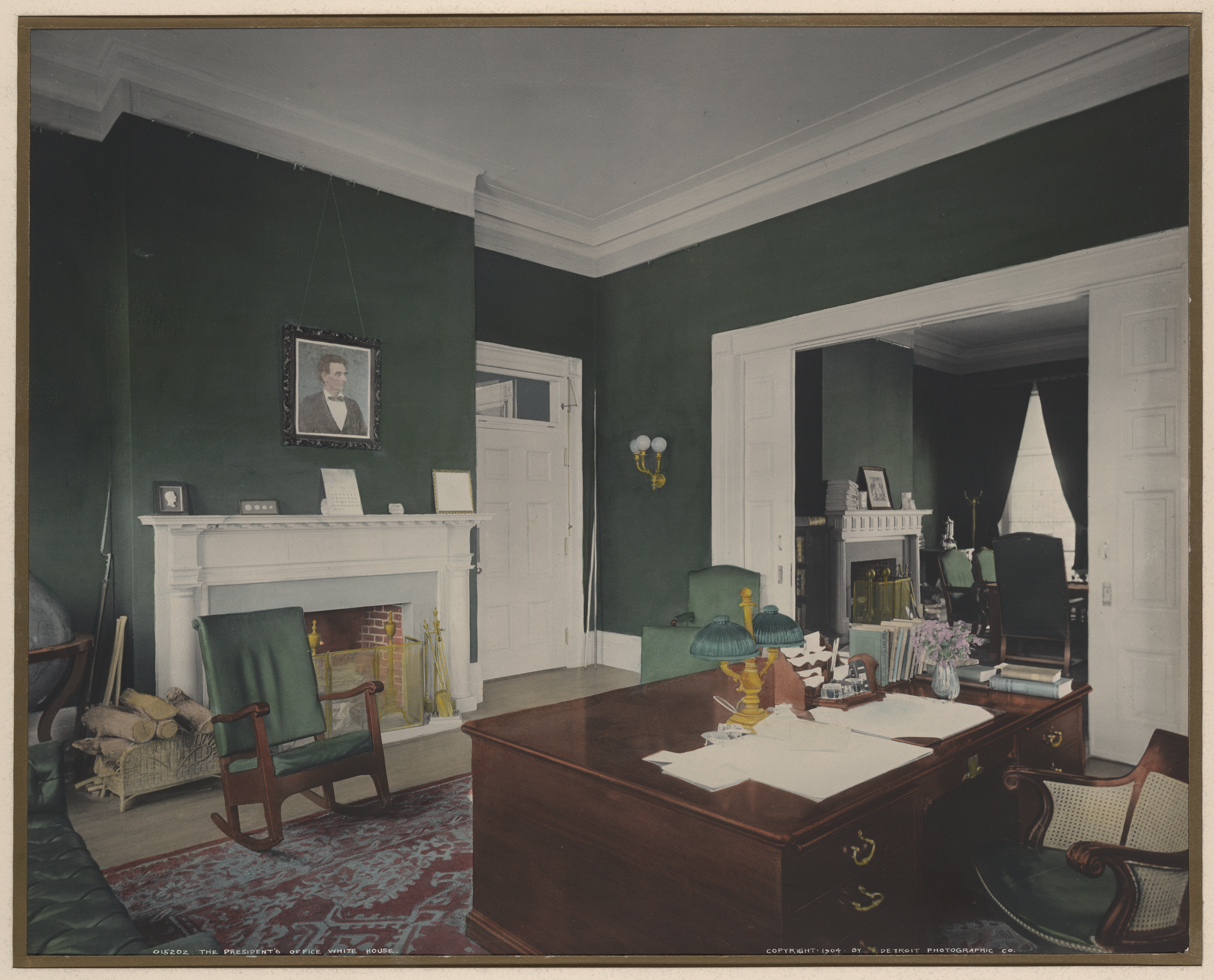
Theodore Roosevelt's 1902 Executive Office, which occupied the space previously (c.1904)

== See also ==
- Cabinet Room
- Oval Office
- West Wing
