= Equestrian Portrait of Charles I =

Painting by Anthony van Dyck

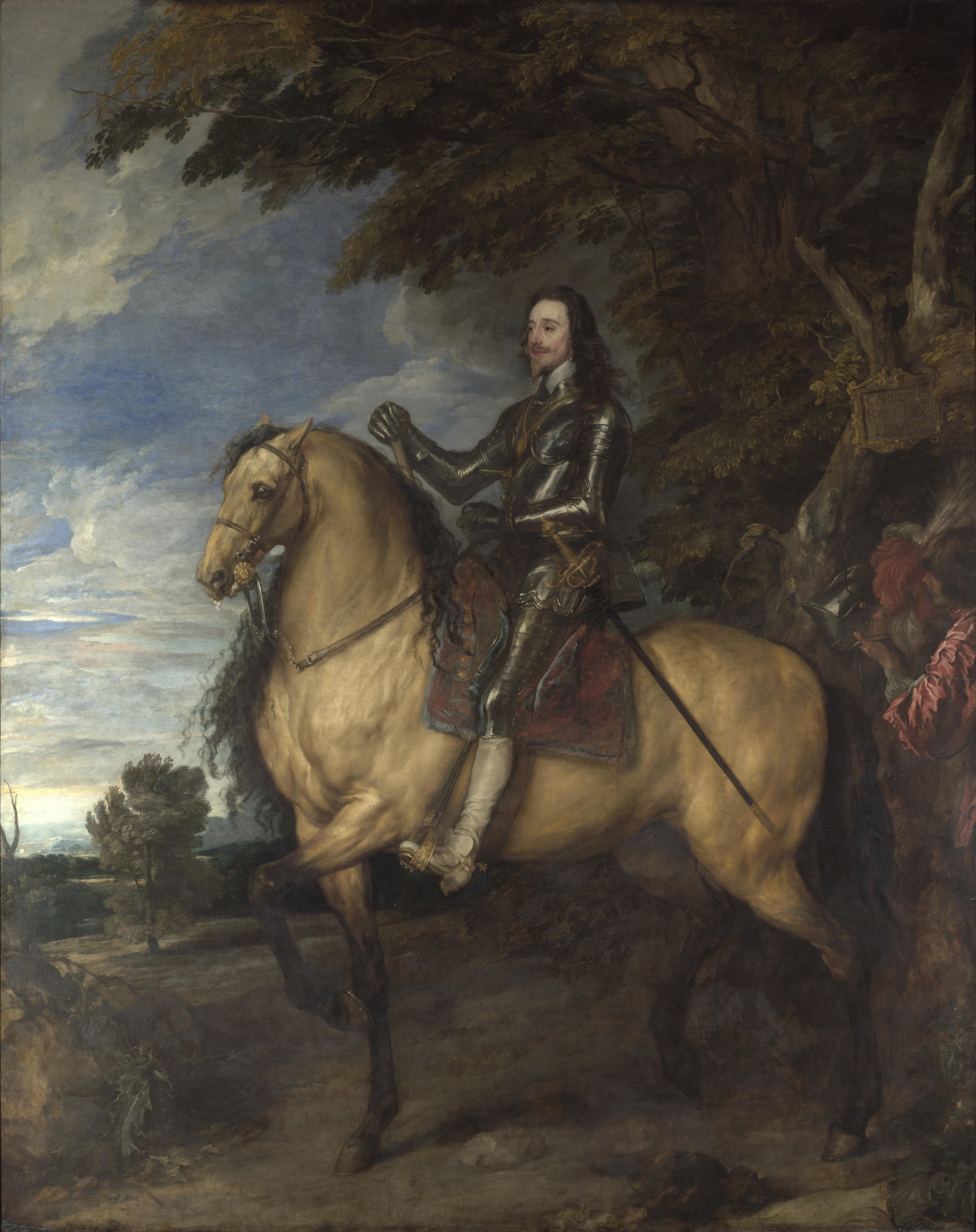
- Artist: Anthony van Dyck
- Year: c. 1637–38
- Medium: Oil on canvas
- Dimensions: 367 cm × 292.1 cm (144 in × 115.0 in)
- Location: National Gallery, London

The Equestrian Portrait of Charles I (also known as Charles I on Horseback) is a large oil painting on canvas by Anthony van Dyck, showing Charles I on horseback. Charles I had become King of England, Scotland and Ireland in 1625 on the death of his father James I, and Van Dyck became Charles's Principal Painter in Ordinary in 1632.

The portrait is thought to have been painted in about 1637–38, only a few years before the English Civil War broke out in 1642. It is one of many portraits of Charles by van Dyck, including several equestrian portraits. It is held by the National Gallery, London.

== Background ==
This is the second equestrian portrait of Charles to be painted by van Dyck. Charles is depicted wearing the same suit of armour, riding a heavily muscled dun horse with a peculiarly small head. To the right, a page proffers a helmet. Charles appears as a heroic philosopher king, contemplatively surveying his domain, carrying a baton of command, with a long sword to his side, and wearing the medallion of the Sovereign of the Order of the Garter. His melancholy, distant expression was seen as a sign of wisdom. He wears the same suit of tilt armour in both equestrian paintings (although the last Royal tilt had been held in 1616, and another proposed in 1622 had been abandoned due to bad weather). A tablet tied to a branch reads CAROLUS I REX MAGNAE BRITANIAE (Charles I King of Great Britain) – a political statement at the time, only 33 years after James had united the crowns of Scotland and England, and proclaimed himself King of Great Britain, and nearly 70 years before the Acts of Union legally created the Kingdom of Great Britain.

An earlier equestrian portrait, Charles I with M. de St Antoine, c. 1633, depicts Charles under a Roman triumphal arch, clad in armour and accompanied by his riding master, Pierre Antoine Bourdon, Seigneur de St Antoine. Van Dyck painted one other major portrait of Charles I with a horse: Charles I at the Hunt (Le Roi à la chasse, c.1635, now in the Louvre), which depicts Charles standing next to a horse in civilian clothing, as if resting on a hunt, wearing a wide-brimmed Cavalier hat and leaning on a walking cane, gazing at a coastal scene; a picture of "gentlemanly nonchalance and regal assurance".

Van Dyck's portraits of Charles on horseback echo the imperial tone of Titian's Equestrian Portrait of Charles V from 1548, itself inspired by equestrian portraits of Roman emperors. In c.1620, van Dyck painted a similar portrait of Charles V. The composition may also borrow from Dürer’s 1513 engraving Knight, Death and the Devil.

This is one of several closely contemporaneous works depicting Charles riding a horse as a means to increase his stature. Charles stood only 5 feet 4 inches (163 cm) high, and was keenly conscious of his height. In addition to the paintings, a near life-size equestrian statue of Charles I by Hubert Le Sueur was erected at Charing Cross in 1633 (although originally commissioned in 1630 for Lord Weston's garden in Roehampton; it now stands to the south of Nelson's Column in Trafalgar Square). A design by Inigo Jones for a triumphal arch at Temple Bar was intended to bear another equestrian statue of Charles.

== Painting materials ==
The investigation of the painting and its pigment analysis was done by scientists at the National Gallery London. Van Dyck used the usual pigments of his time such as smalt, ochres, vermilion, red lake and azurite for the rather subdued tones and subtle colours.

== Provenance ==
The painting was listed in the first catalogue of the Royal Collection, compiled in 1637–40. The very large painting, 3.67 metres (12.0 ft) high by 2.92 metres (9 ft 7 in) wide, was hung at the end of a long gallery at Hampton Court Palace. The Royal Collection was dispersed under the Commonwealth, and the painting was sold to Sir Balthazar Gerbier, formerly the King's agent in Antwerp, for £200 on 21 June 1650. It was acquired by Gisbert van Ceulen, who sold it to Maximilian II Emanuel, Elector of Bavaria and Governor of the Spanish Netherlands, in 1698, but was soon taken from Munich as booty of war by Emperor Joseph I. He presented the painting to John Churchill, 1st Duke of Marlborough, in November 1706.

It was displayed at Blenheim Palace until George Spencer-Churchill, 8th Duke of Marlborough sold it to the National Gallery in 1895 for £17,500. It is usually exhibited in Room 21. The modern Royal Collection includes a smaller version, possibly a modello but perhaps a reduced later version.

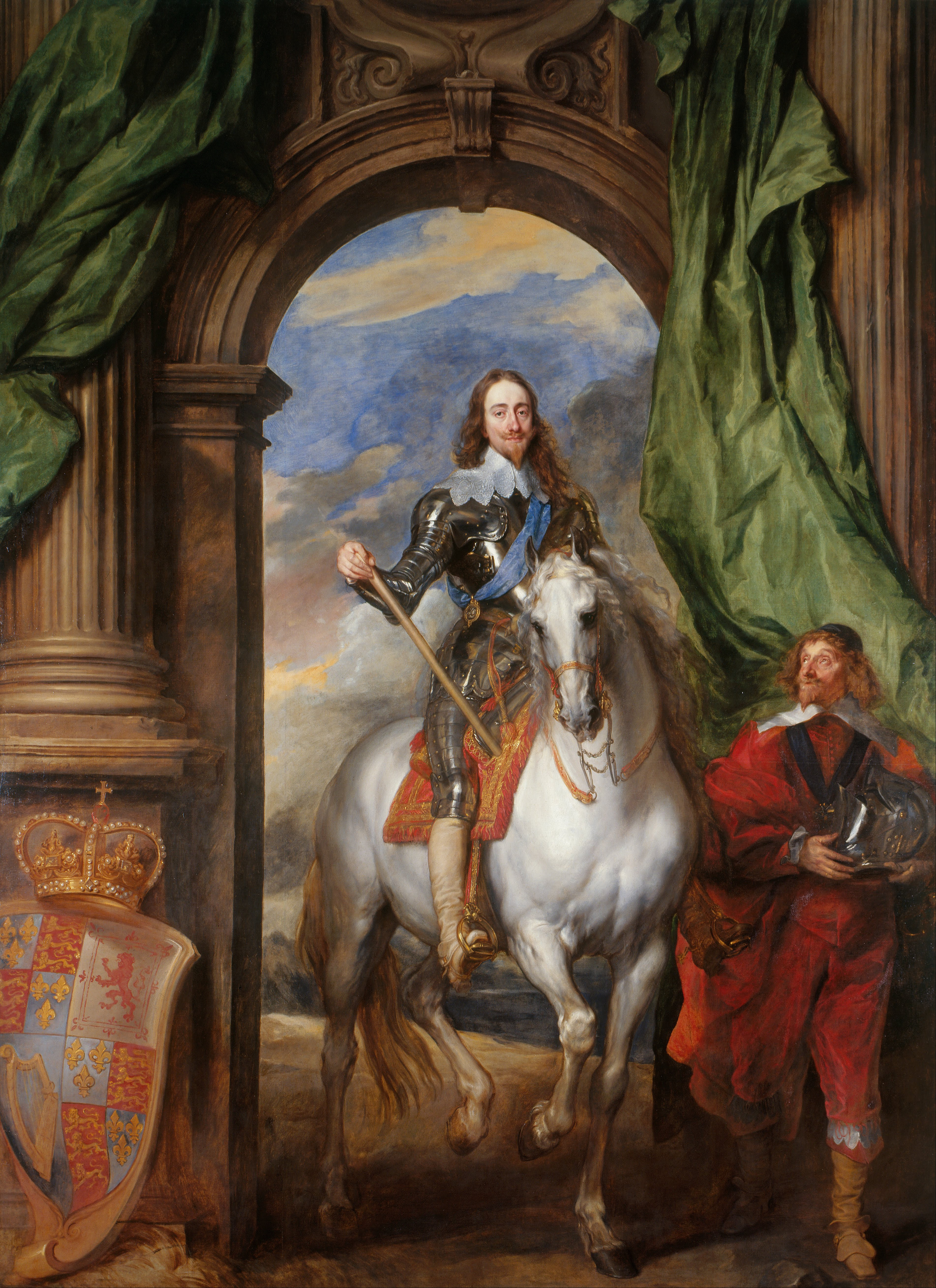
Van Dyck's first equestrian painting of Charles, Charles I with Seigneur de St Antoine, 1633

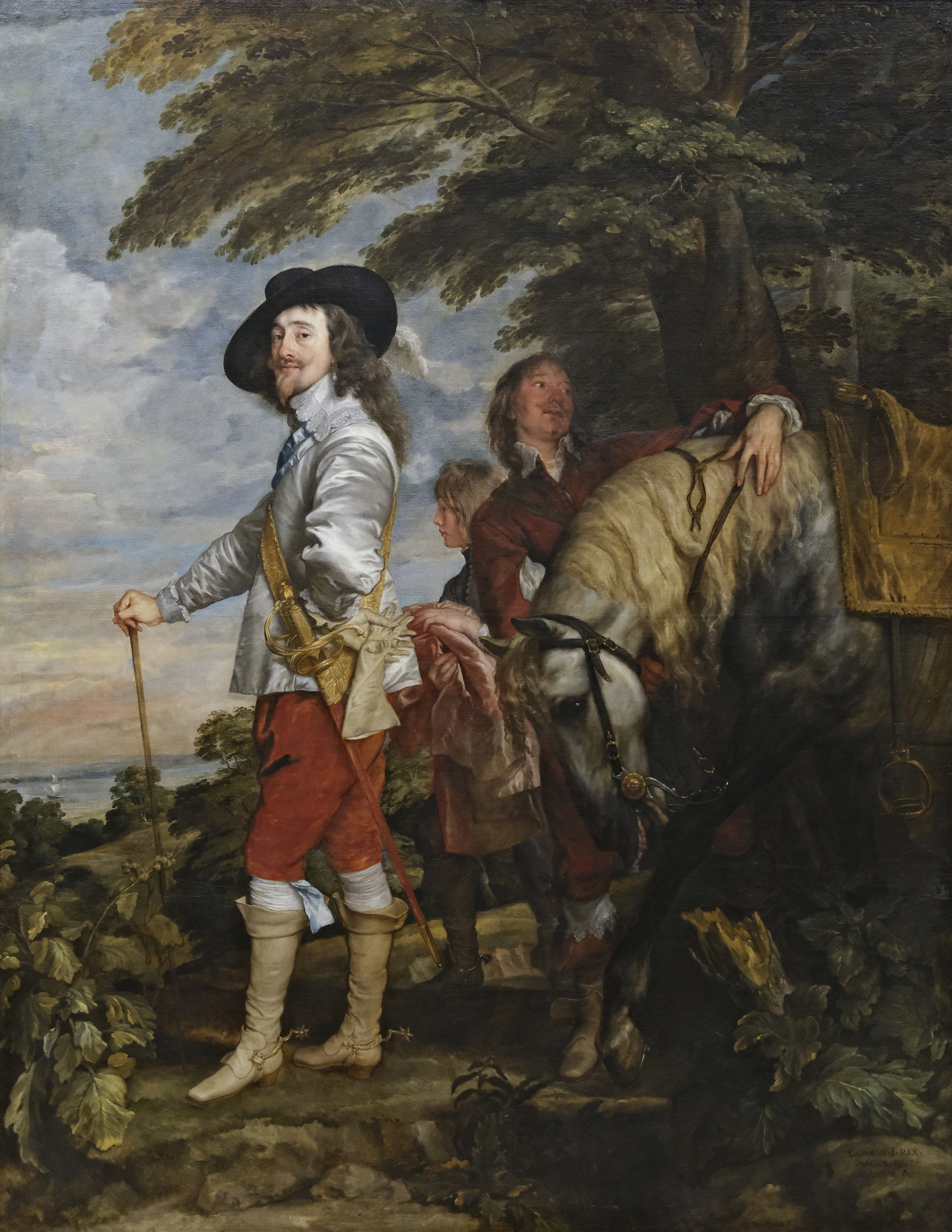
Van Dyck's Le Roi à la chasse, c.1635

Titian's Equestrian Portrait of Charles V, 1548

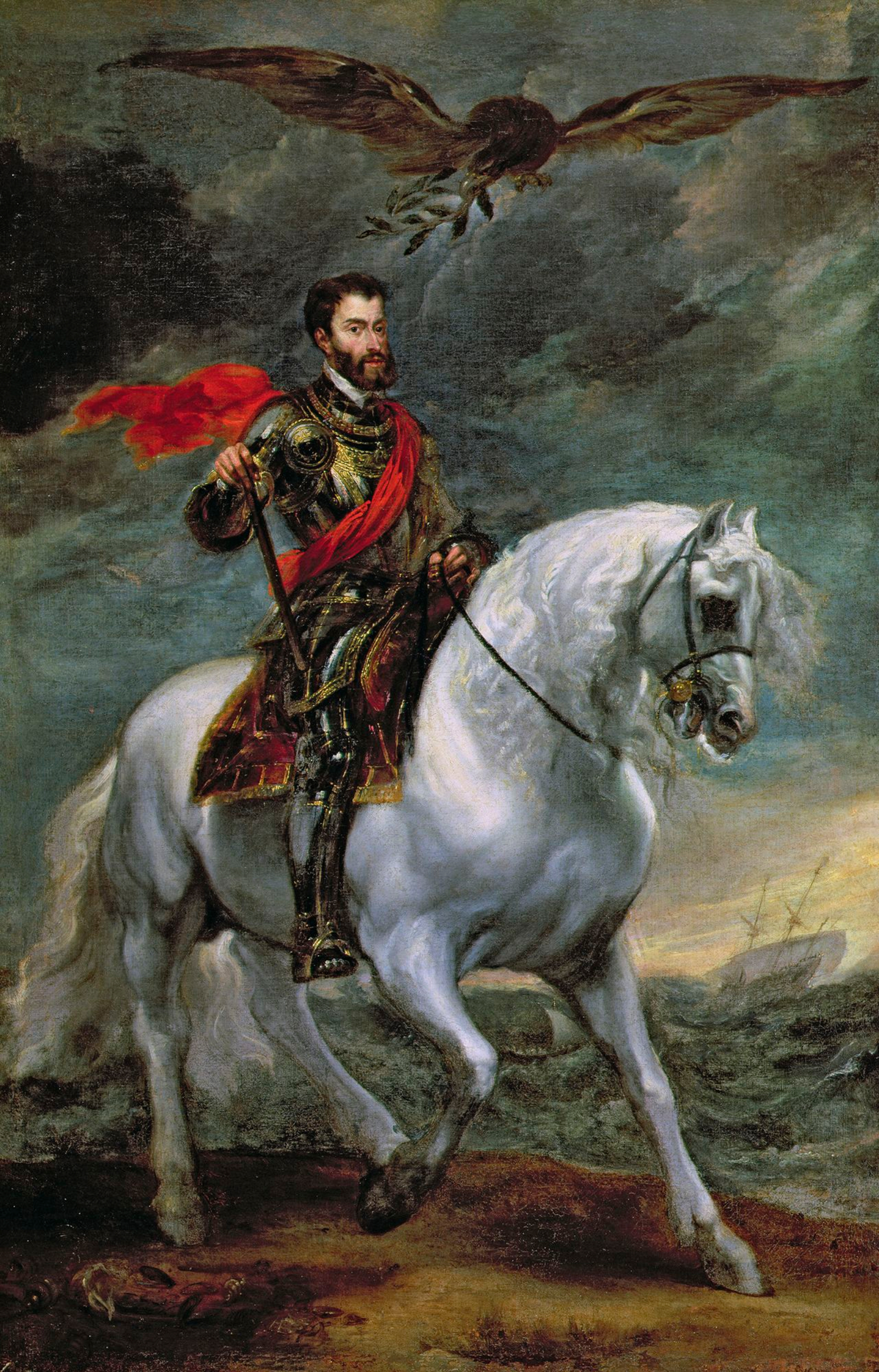
Van Dyck's Equestrian Portrait of Charles V, ca. 1620

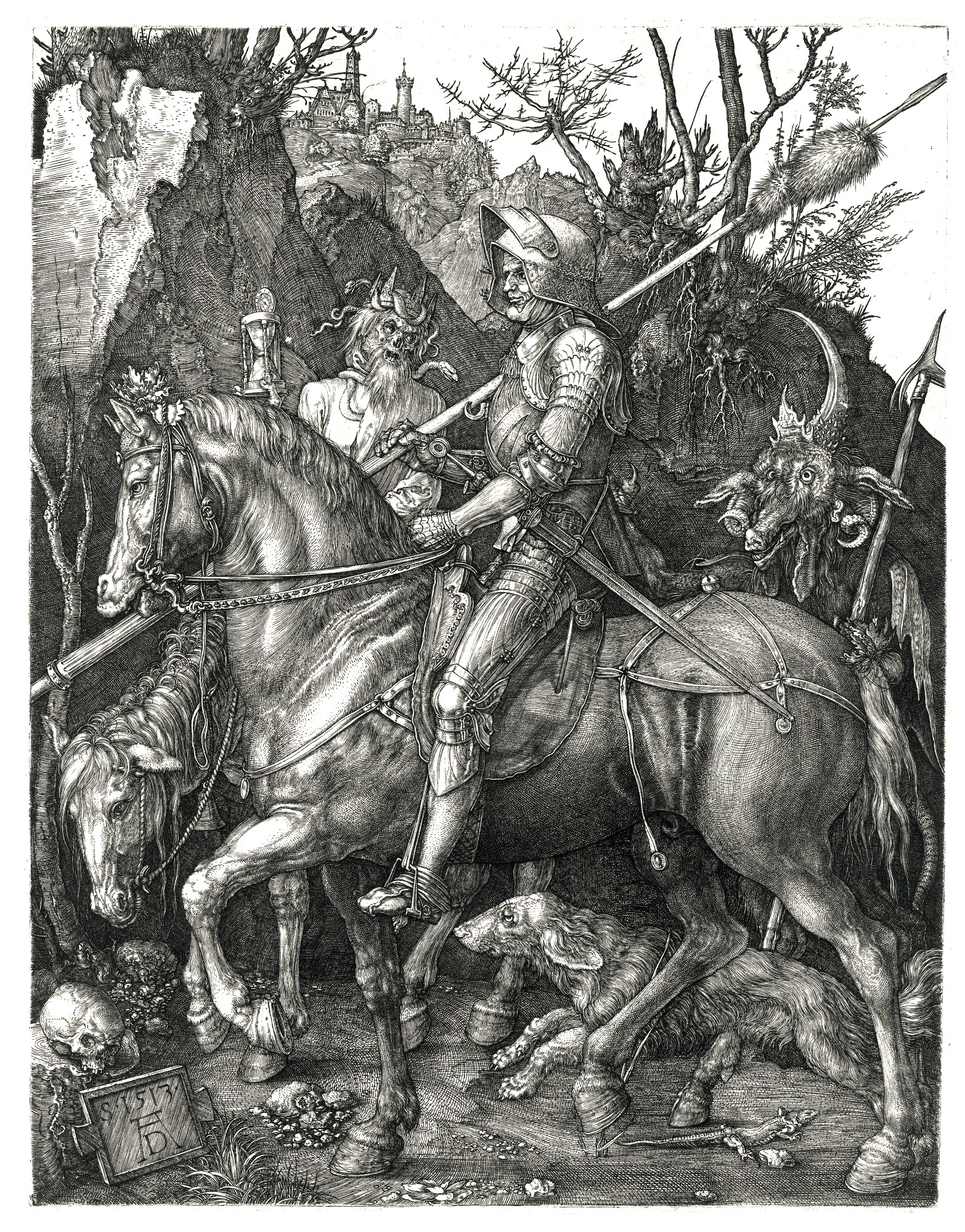
Dürer's Knight, Death and the Devil, 1513

== See also ==
- List of paintings by Anthony van Dyck
