= Portrait of Charles V (Titian, Munich) =

Painting by Titian

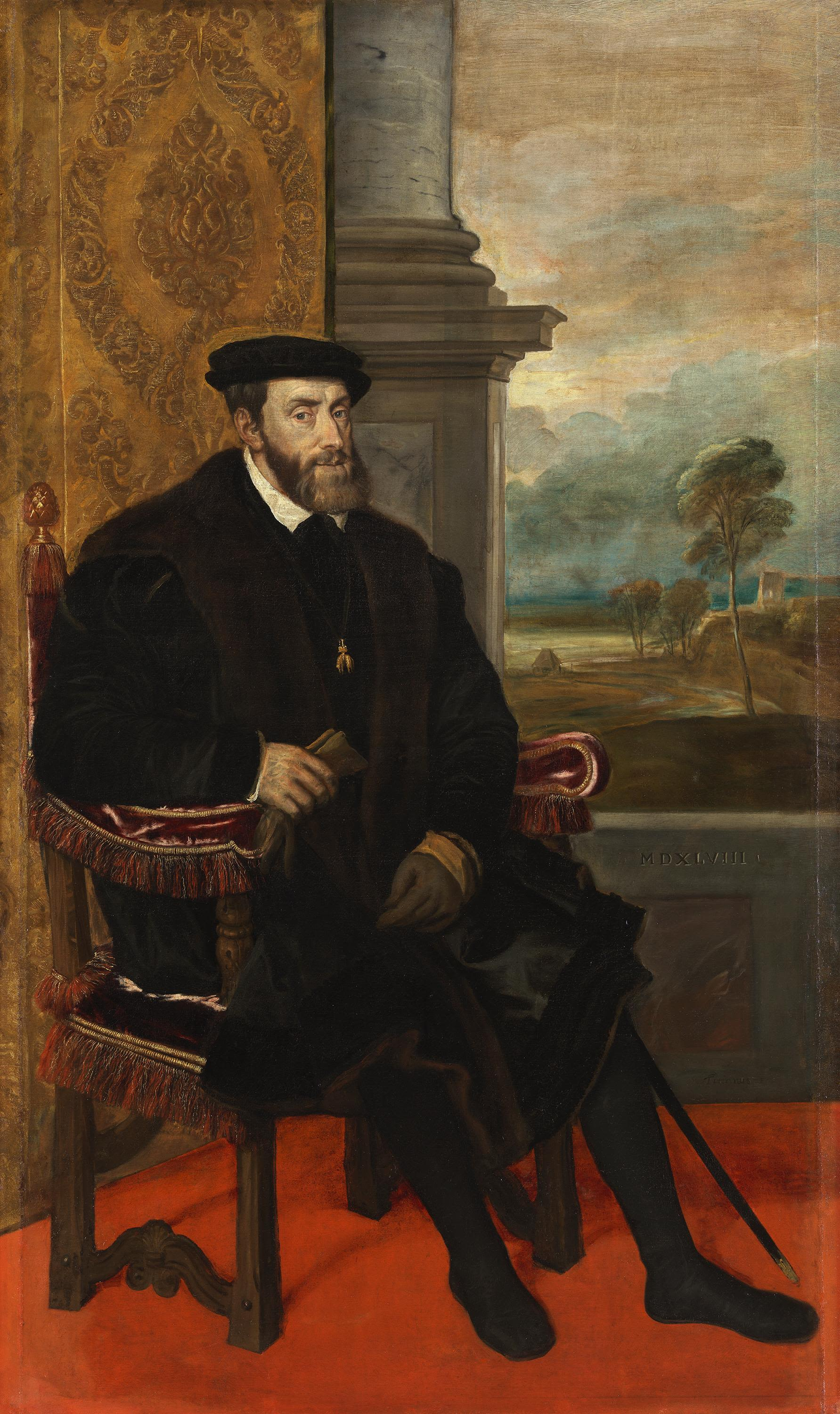
- Artist: Titian
- Year: 1548
- Medium: Oil on canvas
- Dimensions: 203.5 cm × 122 cm (80.1 in × 48 in)
- Location: Alte Pinakothek, Munich

The Portrait of Charles V is an oil on canvas portrait of Charles V, Holy Roman Emperor by Titian, painted in 1548. As with the Equestrian Portrait of Charles V, it was commissioned by Charles during Titian's stay at the imperial court at Augsburg. It is now in the Alte Pinakothek in Munich, Germany.

It shows Charles V seated on a chair to the left, facing the viewer, with his black robes contrasted with the red carpet and gold tapestry behind him. In the right half of the painting is a landscape, barely sketched in, in light colours. Lambert Sustris may have painted the landscape, and possibly even the whole painting in Munich; there may be a lost prime version by Titian.

In his 2014 book World Order, Henry Kissinger writes of the painting: "The effort to fulfill his aspirations inherent in his office was beyond the capabilities of a single individual. A haunting portrait by Titian from 1548 at Munich's Alte Pinakothek reveals the torment of an eminence who cannot reach spiritual fulfillment or manipulate the, to him, ultimately secondary levers of hegemonic rule."

During his stay in Augsburg, Titian painted two portraits of Charles V: this seated portrait and the equestrian portrait. Titian described imperial Augsburg as the glory of the world and told his friend Lorenzo Lotto that he was surrounded by all the favours of the court and of the Emperor.

== See also ==
- List of works by Titian

== Bibliography ==
- (in Italian) Andrew John Martin, "Titianus. F." Il Ritratto di Carlo V seduto dell'Alte Pinakothek di Monaco, in "Studi Tizianeschi. Annuario della Fondazione Centro studi Tiziano e Cadore", Numero V, 2007, pp. 76–96.
