= Charles I with M. de St Antoine =

1633 painting by Anthony van Dyck

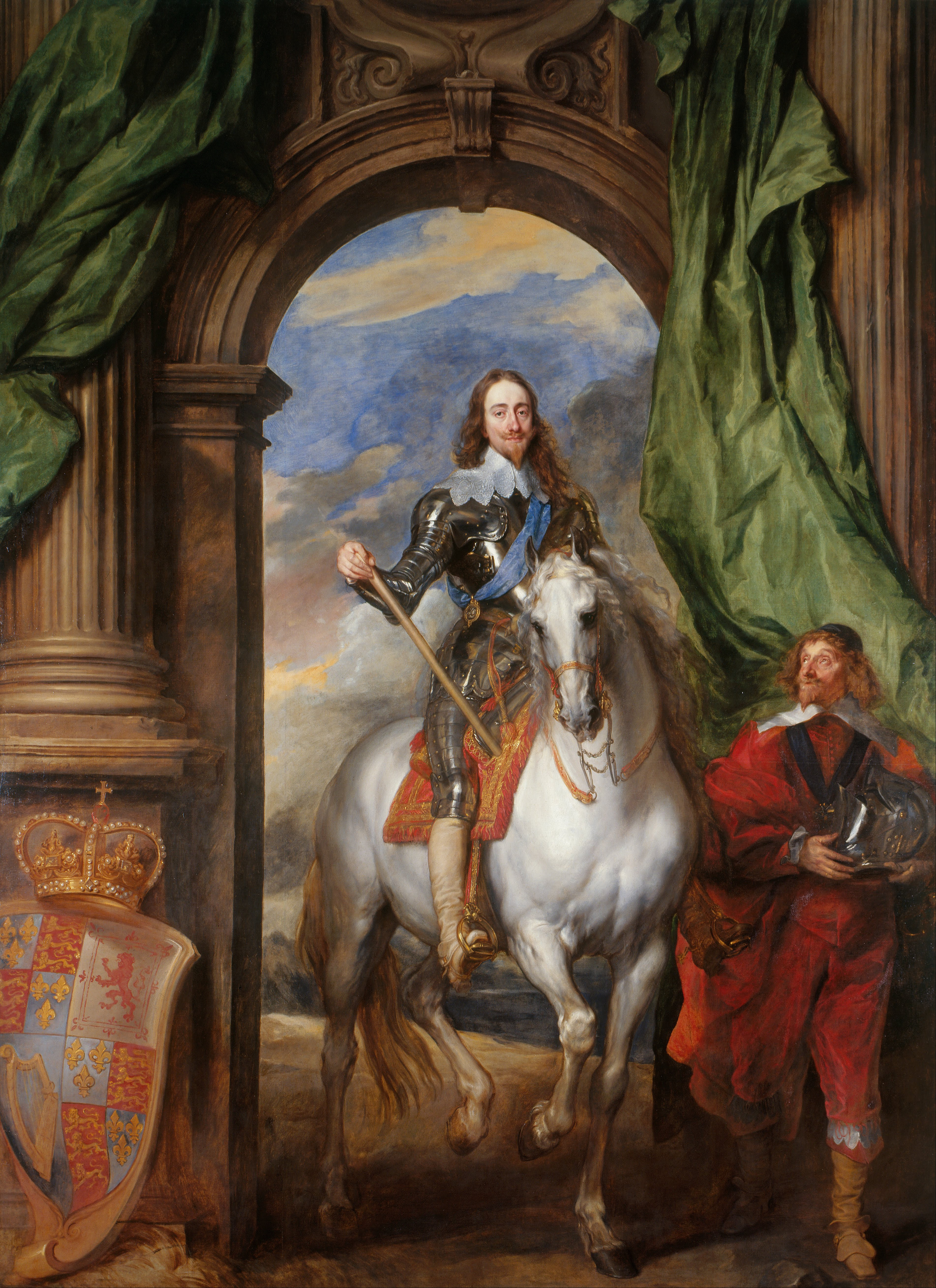
Prime version of van Dyck's first equestrian painting of Charles I, Charles I with M. de St Antoine, 1633

Charles I with M. de St Antoine is an oil painting on canvas by the Flemish painter Anthony van Dyck, depicting Charles I on horseback, accompanied by his riding master, Pierre Antoine Bourdon, Seigneur de St Antoine.

Charles I became King of England, Scotland and Ireland in 1625 on the death of his father James I, and van Dyck became Charles's Principal Painter in Ordinary in 1632. This portrait is dated 1633 and was the first equestrian portrait of Charles I painted by van Dyck.

The prime version is in the Royal Collection and hangs in the East Gallery at Buckingham Palace.

== Description ==
Charles is depicted as a chivalrous knight and sovereign riding a large, muscular white horse – possibly a Lipizzaner – under a neoclassical triumphal arch, from which is fall hangings of green silk. He is clad in parade armour with the blue sash of the Order of the Garter and carries a baton to symbolise his command of the military.

Charles is depicted almost alone, perhaps alluding to the period of his personal rule without Parliament, and is viewed from below, as in van Dyck's 1635 painting Charles I at the Hunt, which disguises the king's lack of stature. To the right stands his riding master, Pierre Antoine Bourdon, Seigneur de St Antoine (with a ribbon around his neck, possibly of the Order of Saint Lazarus) who looks up at the king while holding his helmet.

A large royal coat of arms of the House of Stuart stands to the lower left of the painting – of four quarters: first and fourth the fleur-de-lys of France quartering the three lions of England, second the double tressured lion of Scotland, and third the harp of Ireland – surmounted by the Crown of James I.

The painting is oil on canvas and measures 3.68 × 2.7 metres (12.1 × 8.9 ft). It may have been intended as a theatrical trompe-l'œil flourish at the end of the King's Gallery in St James's Palace.

== Provenance ==
It was valued at £150 and included in the auction of the Royal Collection following the execution of Charles I. It was sold to "Pope" on 22 December 1652 and subsequently acquired by the Flemish painter Remigius van Leemput who lived in London. It was recovered from van Leemput through legal proceedings and returned to Charles II in 1660 upon the Restoration of the Monarchy. The painting remains in the Royal Collection and is on display in the East Gallery at Buckingham Palace.

== Versions ==
Van Dyck painted different versions of this portrait. The prime version is in the Royal Collection. Another version is a 1635 copy in the collection of the Earl of Carnarvon, which can be seen in the State Dining Room of Highclere Castle. He was influenced by his own earlier equestrian portraits of Anton Giulio Brignole-Sale, Marquis of Groppoli, in 1627, and Francisco de Moncada, 3rd Marquis of Aitona, in 1632, and by a portrait made by his master, Peter Paul Rubens, of the Duke of Lerma, dated 1603. Although Van Dyck had not seen this work, it would have been seen by Charles I and probably inspired the commission.

Van Dyck went on to paint a dismounted Charles I at the Hunt in c. 1635, and the Equestrian Portrait of Charles I in c. 1637–38.

Another unfinished version without St Antoine is in the National Trust collection at Petworth House.

== Gallery ==
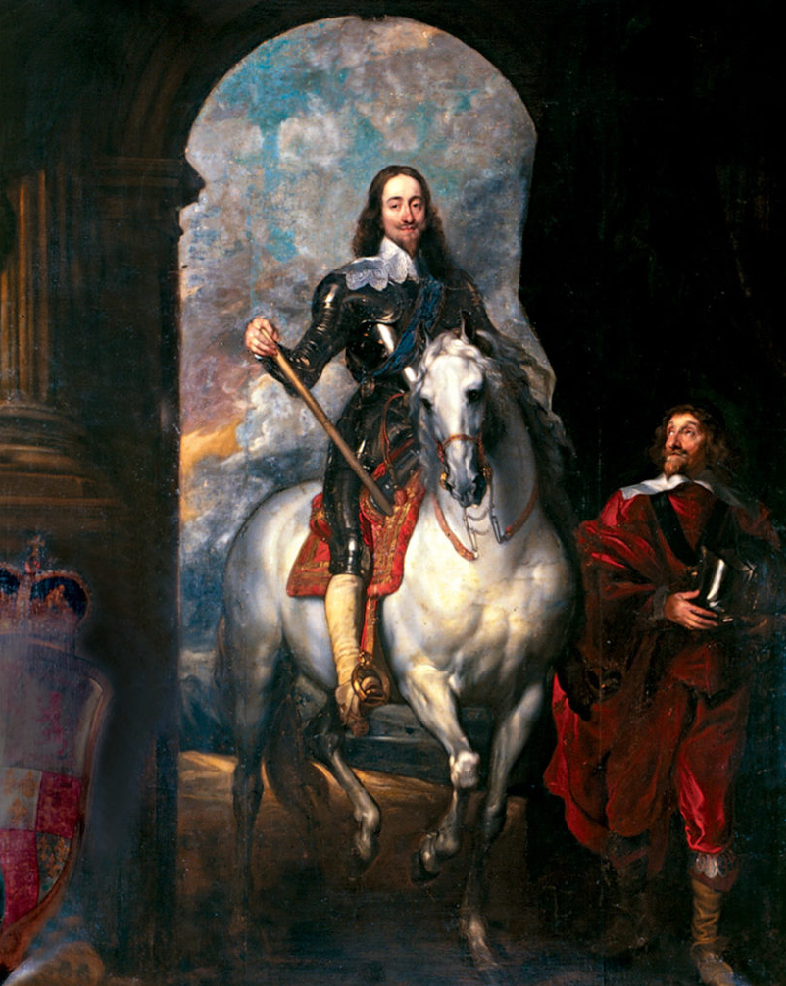
Van Dyck, Charles I with M. de St Antoine (Highclere version)

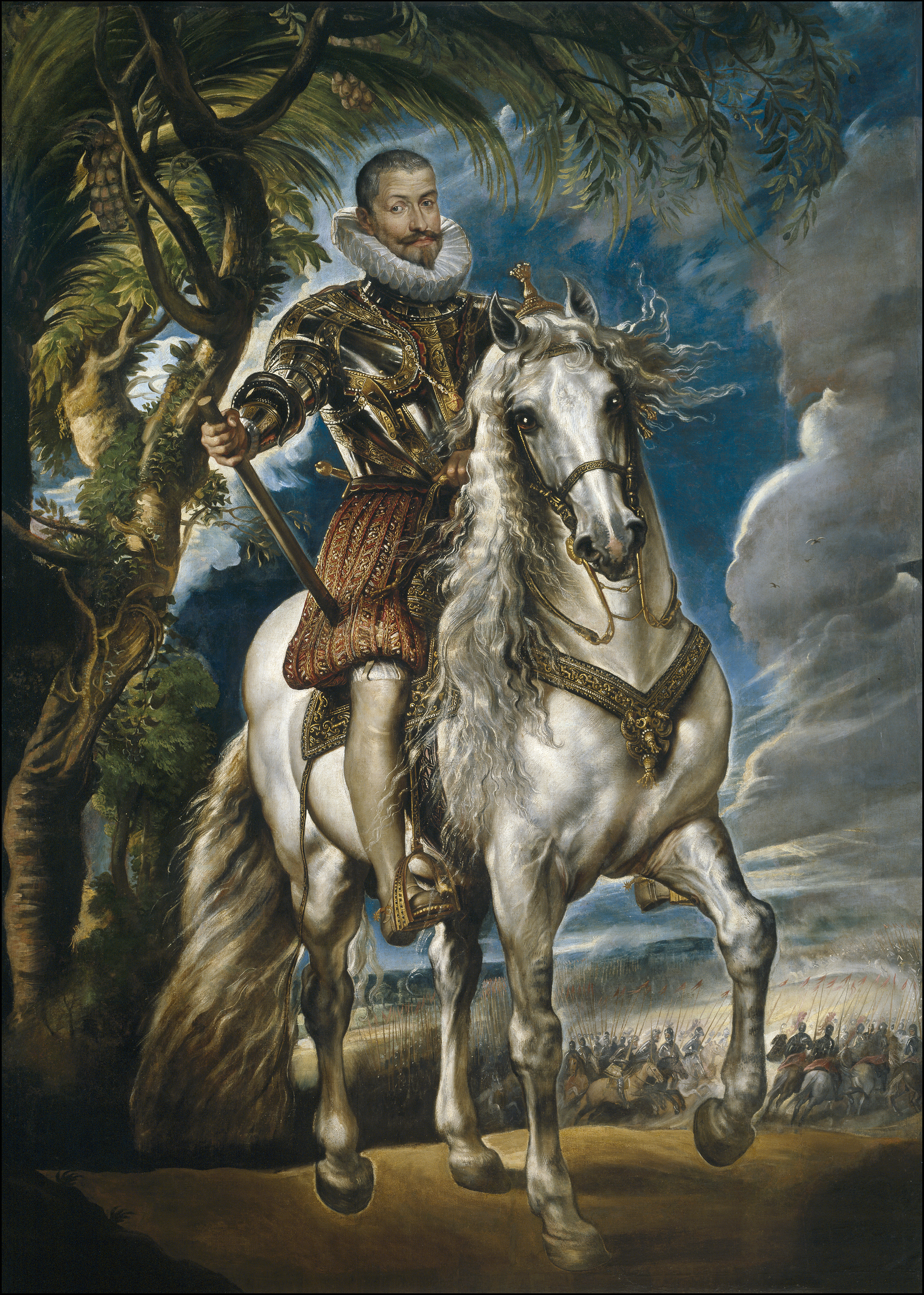
Peter Paul Rubens, Equestrian portrait of the Duke of Lerma, 1603

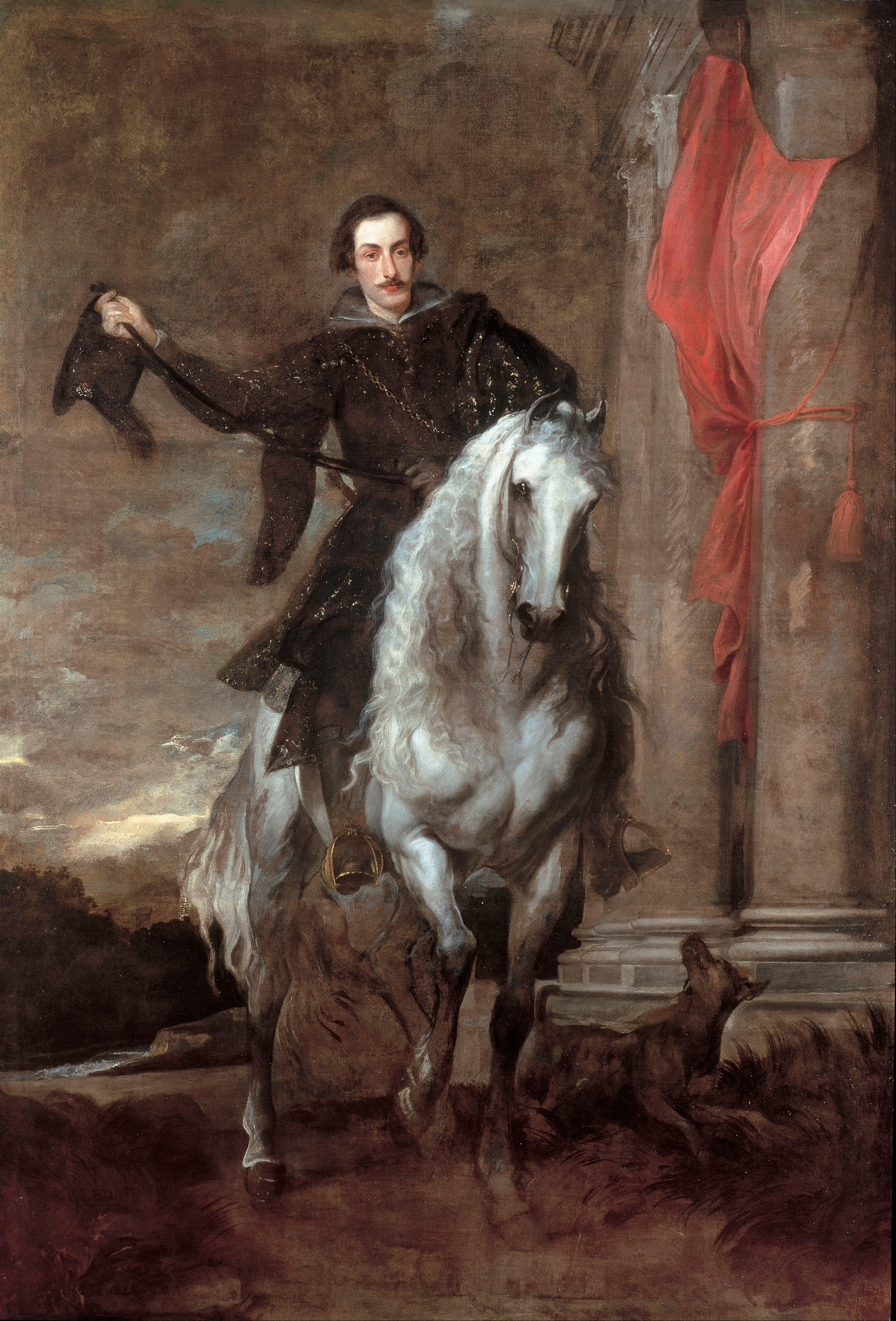
Van Dyck, Equestrian portrait of Anton Giulio Brignole Sale, 1627

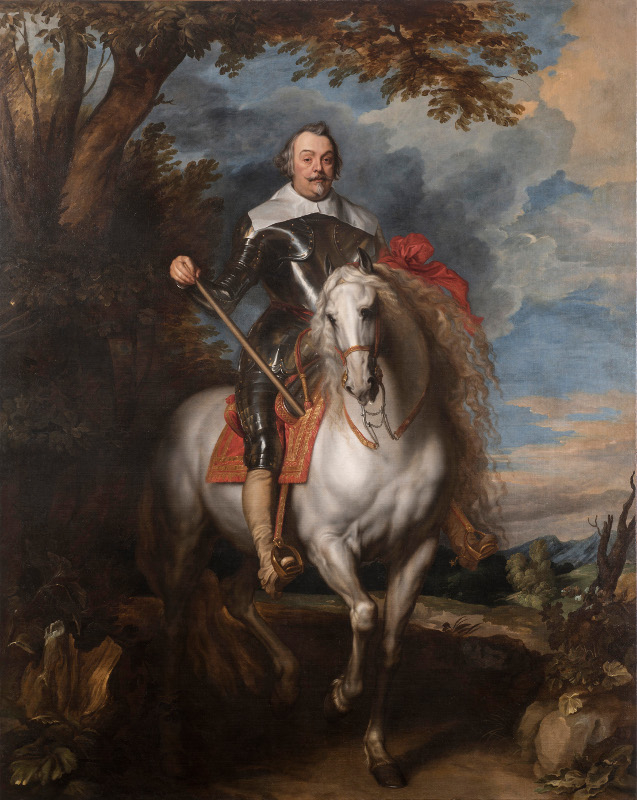
Van Dyck, Equestrian portrait of Francisco de Moncada, 3rd Marquis of Aitona, 1632

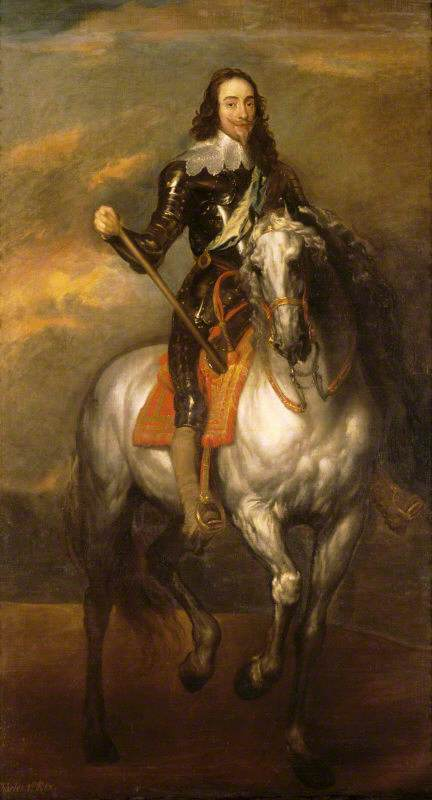
Van Dyck, King Charles I on horseback (Petworth version)

== See also ==
- List of paintings by Anthony van Dyck
