= Equestrian portrait =

Genre of portraiture

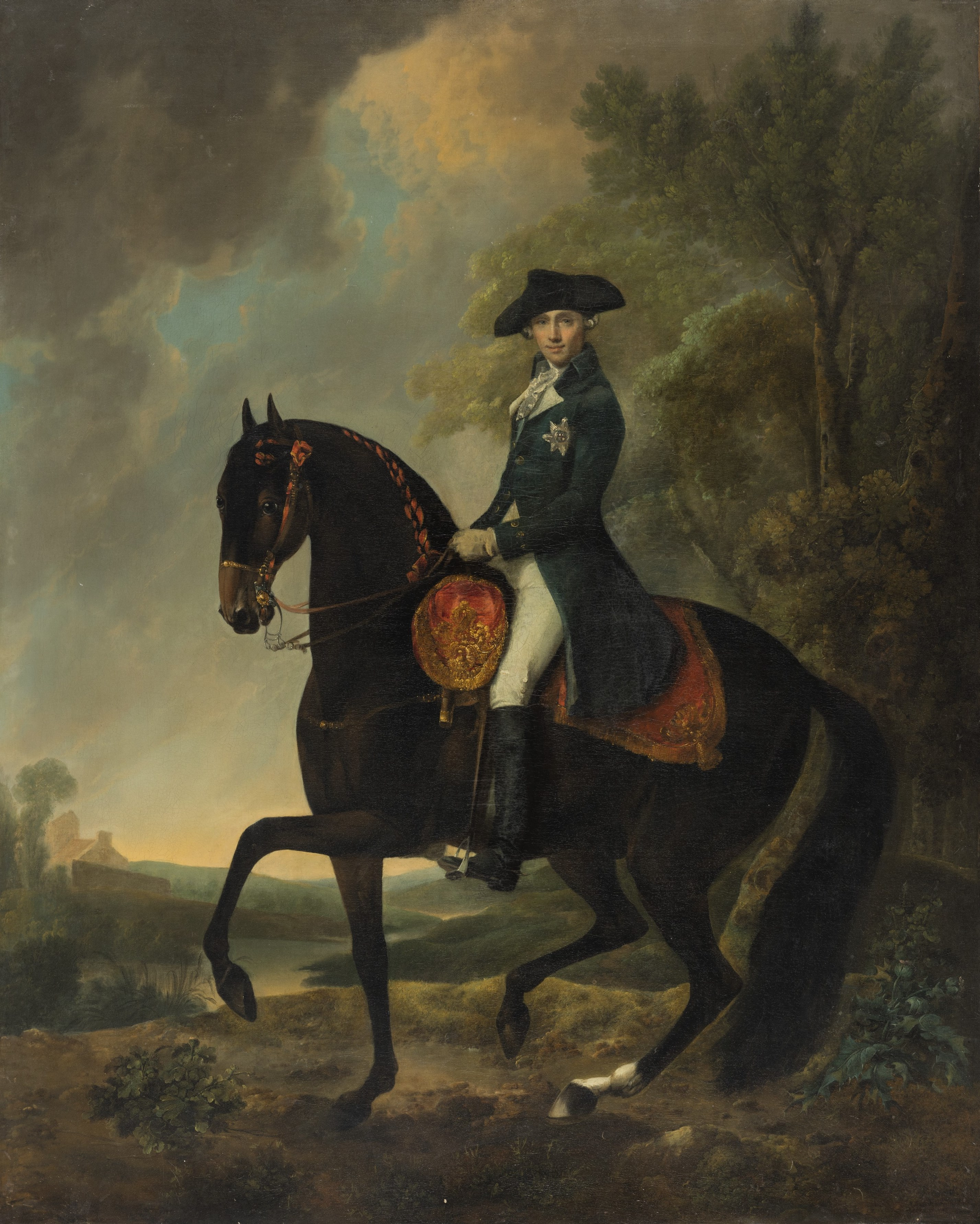
Equestrian portrait of Prince Henry, Duke of Cumberland and Strathearn by David Morier around 1765

An equestrian portrait is a portrait that shows the subject on horseback. Equestrian portraits suggest a high-status sitter, who in many cases was a monarch or other member of the nobility, and the portraits can also carry a suggestion of chivalry.

== History ==
Equestrian statues were made at least as far back as Ancient Rome and the Hellenistic period. Images of the Thracian horseman were recurrent in reliefs and small statues between the fourth century BC and the fourth century AD, especially in Thrace and Moesia Inferior. The bronze Equestrian Statue of Marcus Aurelius in the Capitoline Museums of Rome, of which a replica stands in Piazza del Campidoglio, was erected around 176 AD. Many other bronze statues of the time were melted down for reuse. After a period out of favour, equestrian portraits in Europe, including paintings, drawings and sculpture, revived during the Renaissance around the fifteenth century.

== Examples ==
Many equestrian portraits have been made of monarchs. A portrait minature of Francis I of France (now in the Uffizi Gallery, Florence) was painted around 1540 (tentatively attributed to Francois Clouet or his father, Jean Clouet). Titian painted his Equestrian Portrait of Charles V in 1548. Anthony van Dyck painted Charles I with M. de St Antoine in 1633 and Equestrian Portrait of Charles I in 1635, as well as Charles I at the Hunt (an equine portrait rather than an equestrian portrait as the king is dismounted) in 1637–1638. Equestrian portraits of Napoleon include Napoleon Crossing the Alps (1801–1805) by Jacques-Louis David. A modern painting based on David's original entitled Napoleon Leading the Army over the Alps was painted in 2005 by Kehinde Wiley, who also painted a version of Rubens' Philip II on Horseback (1628) with Michael Jackson replacing the king.

In the iconography of Saint George and the Dragon, George is often portrayed on horseback, as in Rubens' painting Saint George and the Dragon (1605–1607). The same is true for some other warrior saints, including Demetrius of Thessaloniki and Theodore of Amasea, who are sometimes paired with George.

Equestrian portraits of knights include those of the fictional knight-errant Don Quixote, of which there are many examples including a famous 1955 sketch by Pablo Picasso.
