= Charles I at the Hunt =

1635 painting by Anthony van Dyck

External videos
- Van Dyck's Charles I at the Hunt, Smarthistory

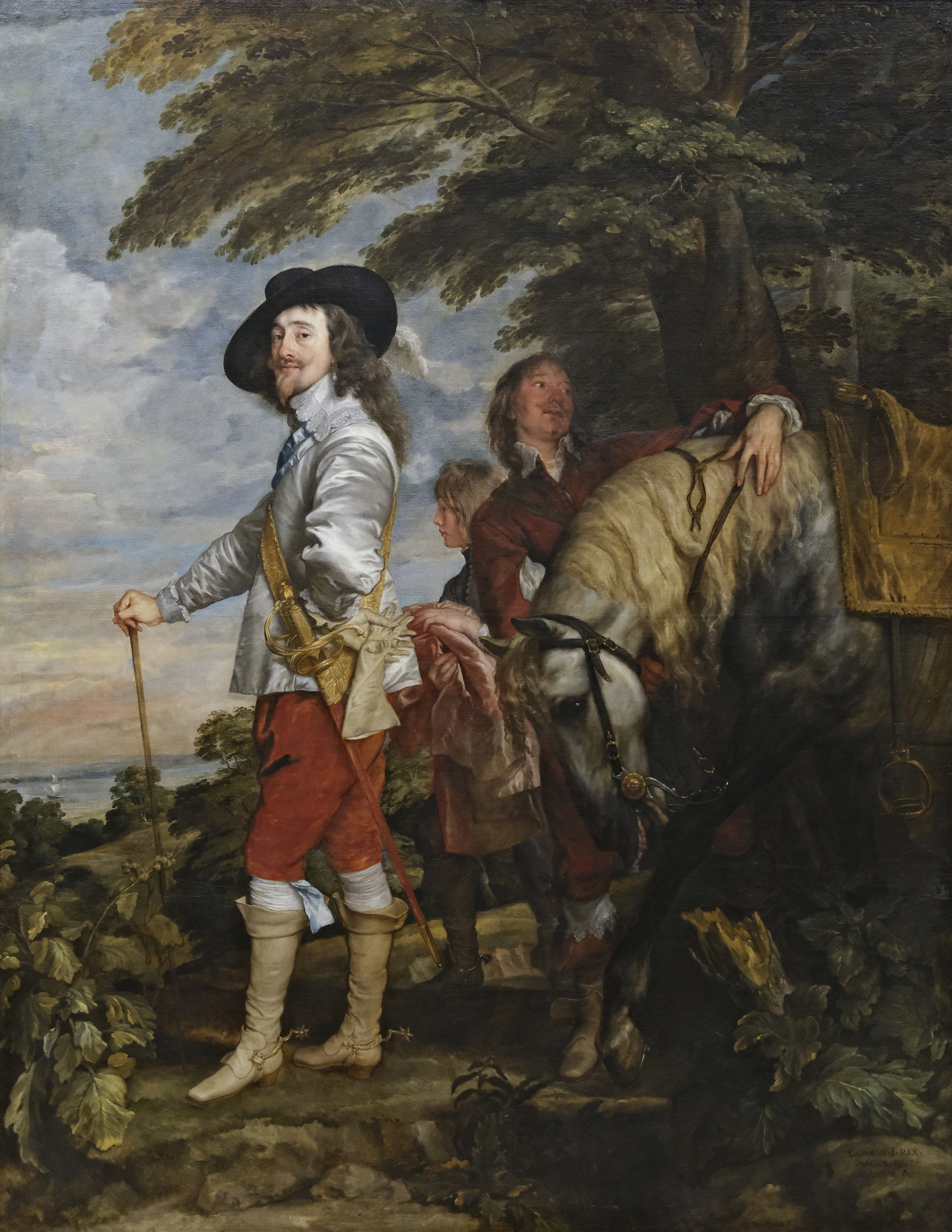
Charles I at the Hunt (or Le Roi à la chasse), Anthony van Dyck, c. 1635, Louvre

Charles I at the Hunt, also known under its French title Le Roi à la chasse, is an oil-on-canvas portrait of Charles I of England by Anthony van Dyck, dated to c. 1635, and now in the Louvre Museum in Paris. It depicts Charles in civilian clothing and standing next to a horse as if resting on a hunt, in a manner described by the Louvre as a "subtle compromise between gentlemanly nonchalance and regal assurance".

Van Dyck gives his naturalistic style full expression: "Charles is given a totally natural look of instinctive sovereignty, in a deliberately informal setting where he strolls so negligently that he seems at first glance nature's gentleman rather than England's King". The 266 cm by 207 cm painting depicts Charles in lighter colours to the left of the painting, standing against the darker ground and the shadowed servants and horse under a tree to the right; his dark hat prevents his face from appearing washed out by the sky.

Charles is dismounted, and stands as if surveying his domain and the sea beyond (perhaps the Solent with the Isle of Wight visible in the distance). His head is turned and his face pinched in a disdainful and somewhat bitter smile. The King was famously sensitive about his height, and the painting compensates by placing the viewer at a low-angle point of view, looking up at the King. A Latin inscription on a rock in the lower right corner establishes his rights as a king: Carolus.I.REX Magnae Britanniae ("Charles I, King of Great Britain" – a political statement at the time, only 32 years after his father James had united the crowns of Scotland and England, and proclaimed himself King of Great Britain, and nearly 70 years before the Acts of Union legally created the Kingdom of Great Britain).

Charles is dressed as an aristocratic gentleman in a wide-brimmed cavalier hat, teardrop earring, shimmering silver satin doublet, red breeches, and turned-down leather boots, apparently resting during a day of hunting. He is girt with a sword, with one hand resting nonchalantly on a walking stick; the other rests on his hip, holding his gloves as a sign of his sovereignty and assurance. The painting also shows a young page and Charles' picture-buying agent and favoured courtier, Endymion Porter, who is holding the horse. The horse seemingly bows its head in submission to the king.

In his three years as England's Principal Painter in Ordinary, van Dyck had already made two other equestrian portraits of Charles in armour: Charles I with M. de St Antoine, depicting Charles accompanied by his riding master, Pierre Antoine Bourdon, Seigneur de St Antoine; and Equestrian Portrait of Charles I, depicting Charles as a heroic philosopher king, contemplatively surveying his domain.

Charles paid van Dyck £100 for the painting in 1638 – although the artist originally requested £200 – but it is not mentioned in the inventory of his collections after his execution in 1649. It was in France by 1738, and Madame du Barry sold the painting to Charles' descendant, King Louis XVI, in 1775.

== See also ==
- List of paintings by Anthony van Dyck
