= Tadeusz Styka =

Polish artist (1889-1954)

Tadeusz Styka (Tadé Styka)
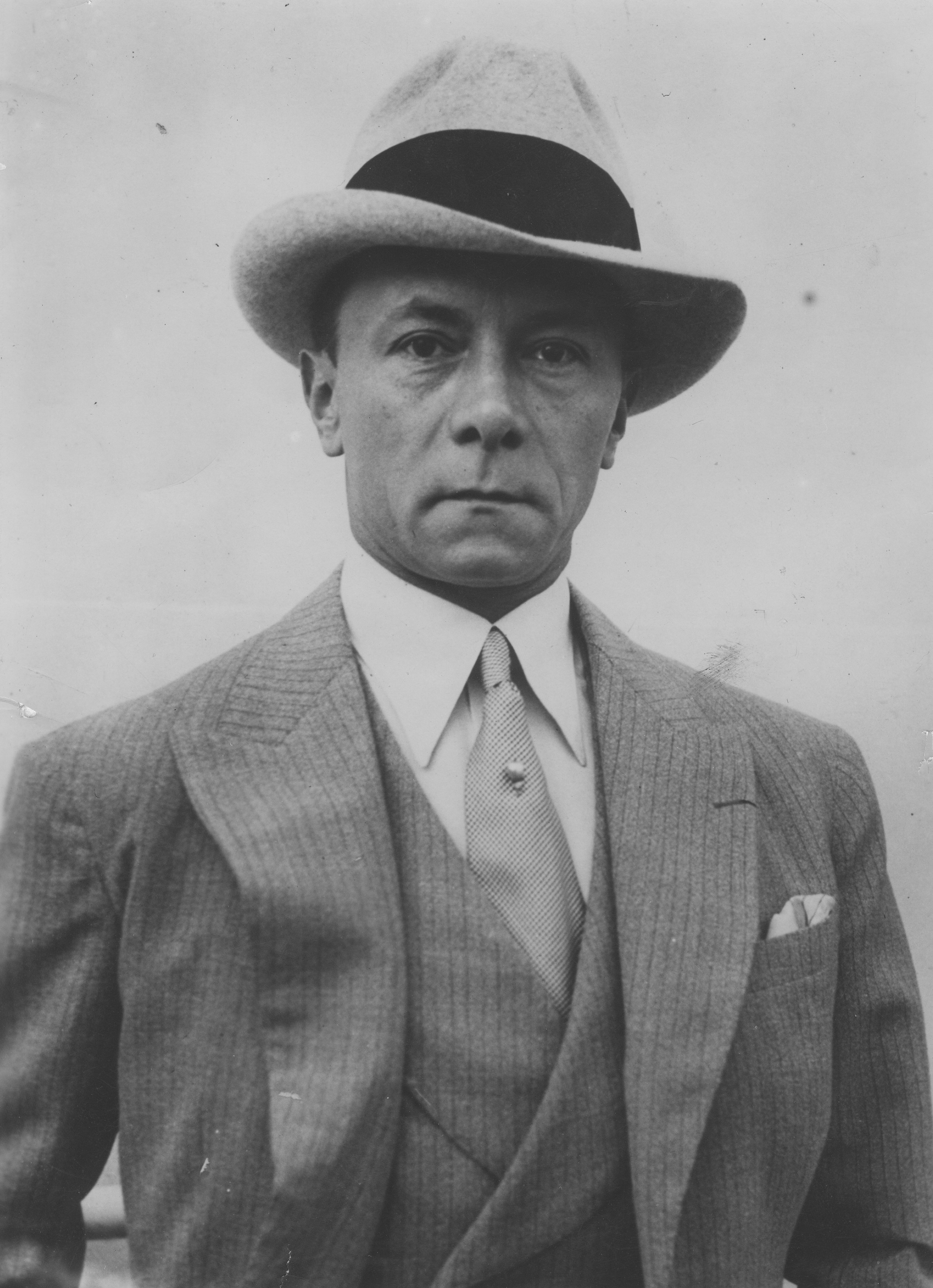
- Tadeusz Styka
- Born: April 12, 1889; Kielce, Poland
- Died: September 11, 1954 (aged 65); New York, USA
- Known for: Painting

Tadeusz Styka (1889–1954; aka Tade Styka) was a Polish artist most noted for his portraiture. He was educated and trained by his father, the artist Jan Styka. For his work, he was awarded the Ordre national de la Légion d'honneur (The Legion of Honour) by the French Government.

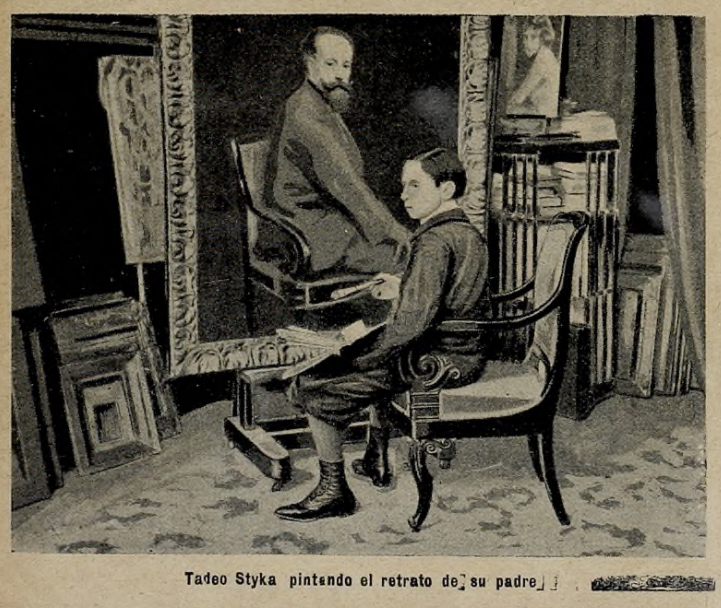
Tadeusz Styka at age 13 painting his father

His most well known picture is probably the equestrian portrait of Theodore Roosevelt entitled Rough Rider hung over the fireplace in the Roosevelt Room in the White House.

Styka is also known as the painting instructor and friend of the artist Huguette Clark, the reclusive heir to a copper fortune.

== Gallery ==
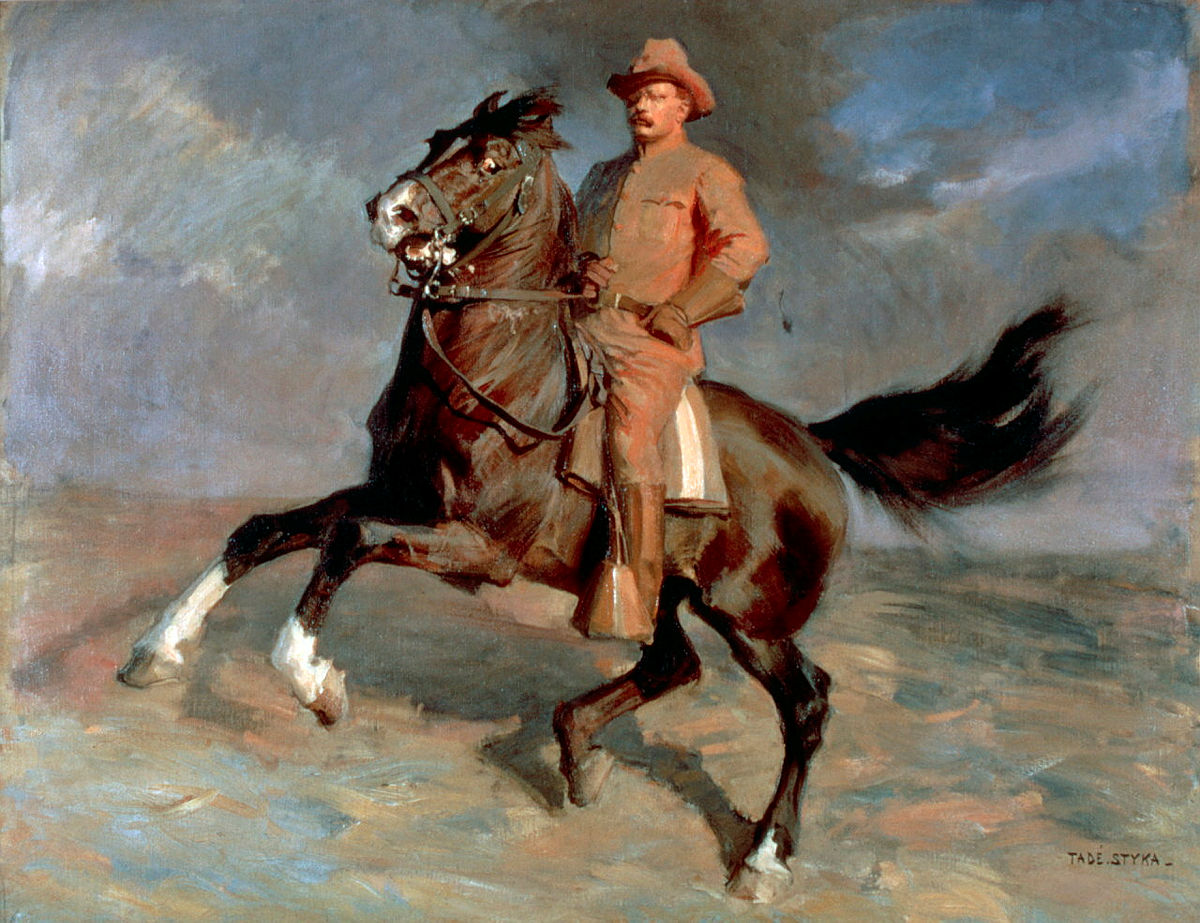
Portrait of Theodore Roosevelt

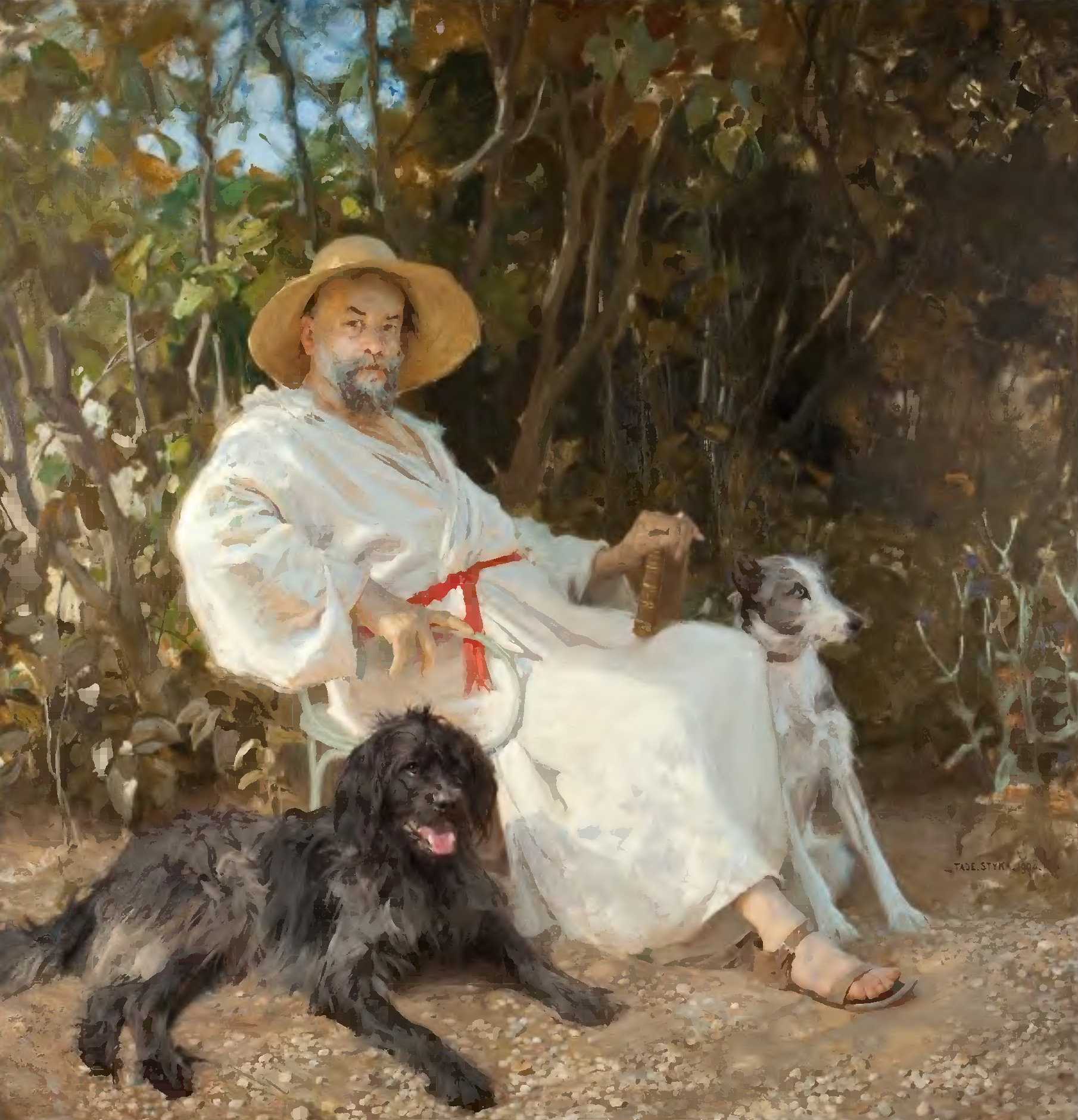
Self-portrait

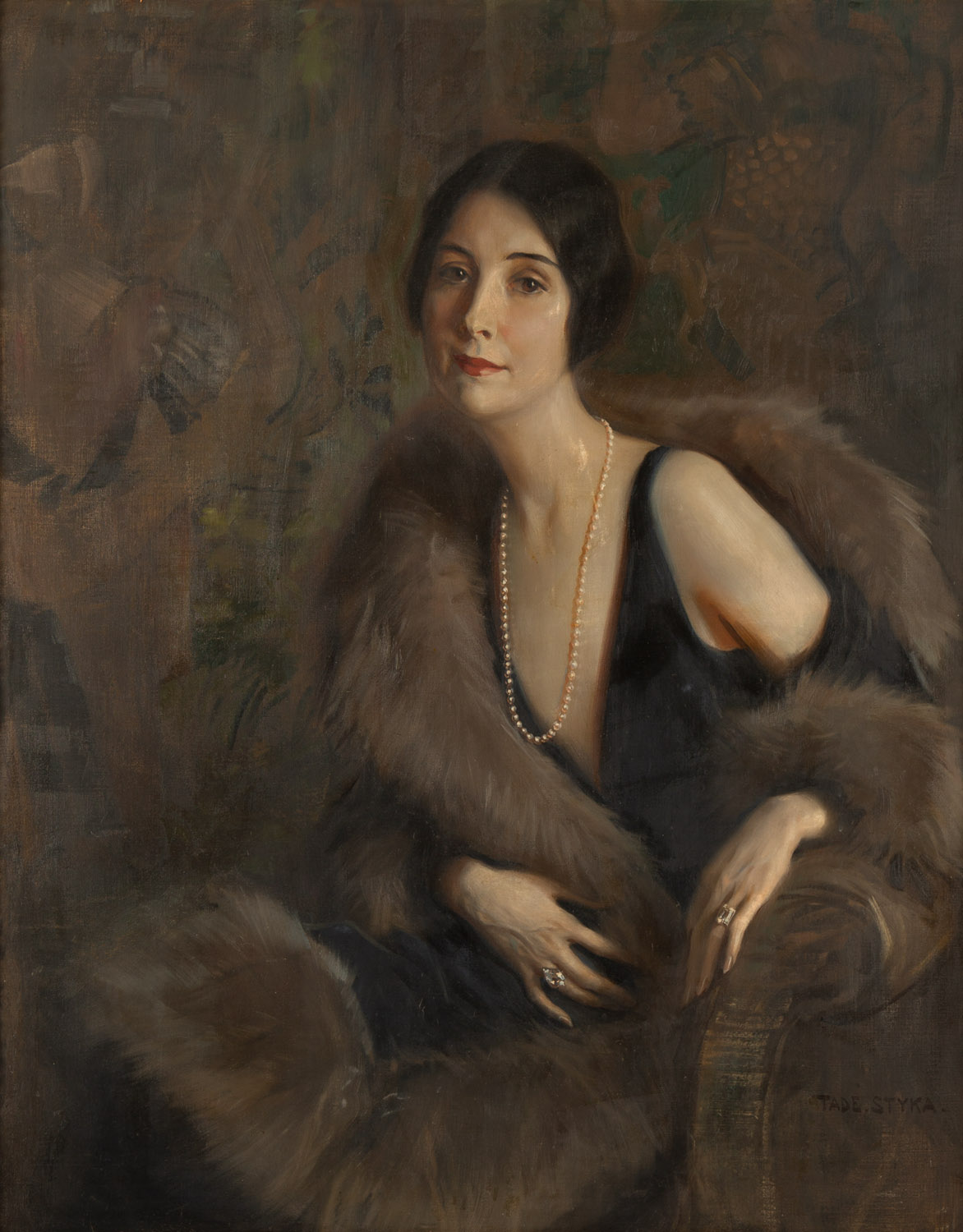
Portrait of a lady in fur

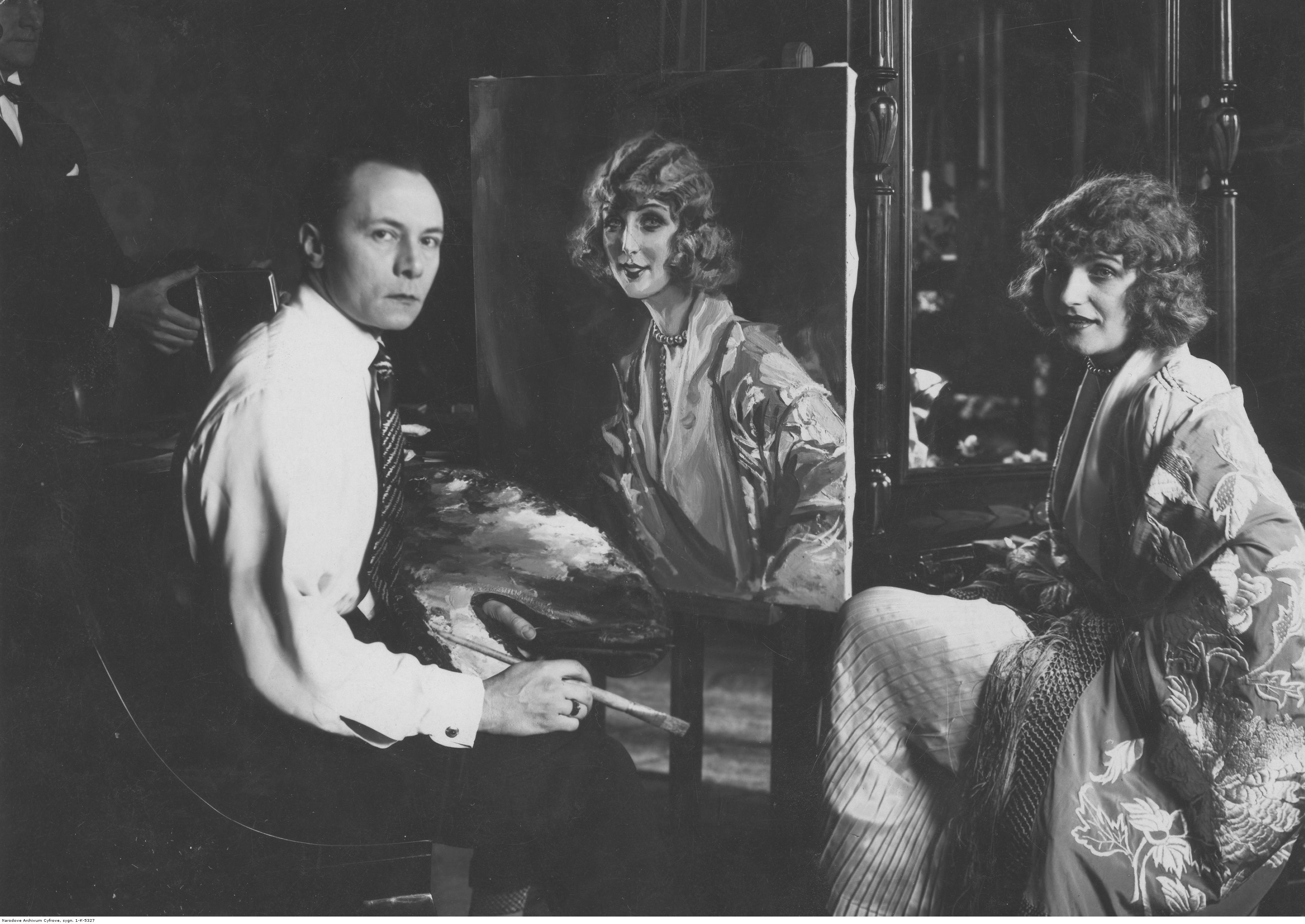
Tadeusz Styka with Kazimiera Skalska

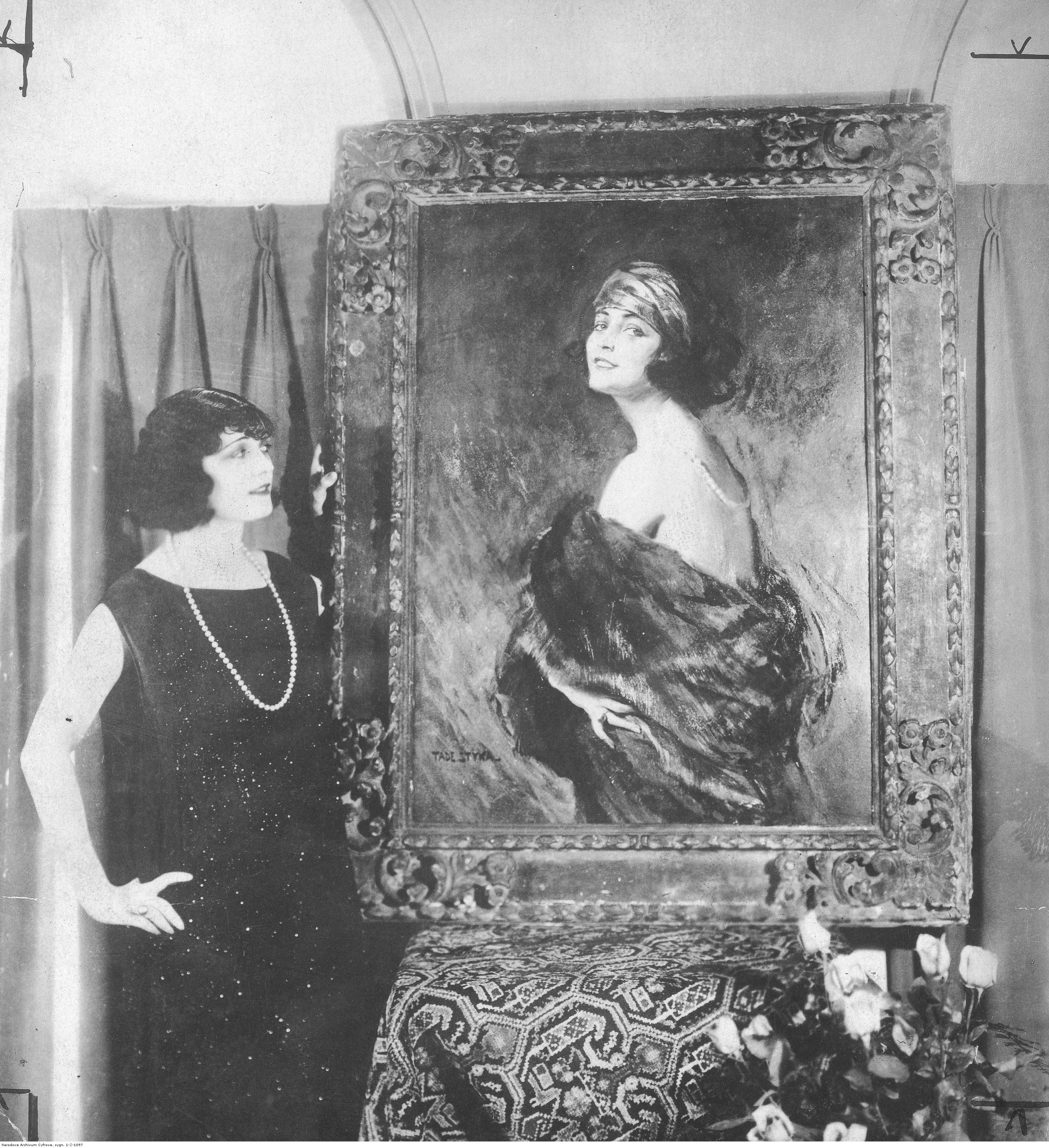
Pola Negri
