= John M. DeStefano =

American artist

John M. DeStefano (died April 8, 2008, in Naples, Florida) was an American sculptor, painter and businessman.

Born in Avellino, Italy, he immigrated to Boston, Massachusetts with his family at the age of six. DeStefano studied at the North Bennett Street Industrial School and earned a scholarship to attend the School of the Museum of Fine Arts but was forced to drop out after two years due to a lack of funds.

In 1933, while still a student, DeStefano created a cast bronze bas-relief profile portrait of Franklin Delano Roosevelt that is located in the Roosevelt Room of the White House and is highlighted by tour guides. Former Boston mayors James Michael Curley and John F. Fitzgerald and two local businessmen provided the funds for the bronze and for DeStefano to travel to Washington D.C. to personally present the work to Roosevelt. Many of DeStefano's future subjects were also of a civic nature.

During the Great Depression, DeStefano worked as an art teacher and on projects for the federal Works Projects Administration jobs program. Although his lifelong ambition was to be a professional artist, DeStefano felt that he could not support his family with his artwork. In 1937, DeStefano established a business, DeStefano Studios House of Mannequins, which restored and created mannequins for local department stores. During World War II, DeStefano served in the United States Navy in the South Pacific as a member of the 58th Seabee Battalion. He returned to his business after the war and continued to make mannequins commercially until his retirement in the 1980s.

By the late 1970s, DeStefano's factory in Woburn, Massachusetts produced over 3,000 mannequins a day for stores such as Jordan Marsh, Filene's and Lord and Taylor. In a 1979 profile, the Boston Globe referred to DeStefano as "the dean of local mannequin makers."

As an artist, DeStefano worked in cast bronze, terra cotta and stone. His sculptures are displayed at Plimoth Patuxet and at Harvard University's Peabody Museum of Archaeology and Ethnology.
