= Napoleon Leading the Army over the Alps =

Painting by Kehinde Wiley

Napoleon Leading the Army over the Alps is an equestrian portrait of a youthful black male painted by the contemporary artist Kehinde Wiley in 2005. It is based on Jacques-Louis David’s 1801 equestrian portrait, Napoleon Crossing the Alps. This painting was chosen by a man who Wiley had approached in the streets. The basic composition of Wiley's painting is the same as the 200-year-old painting it was based on, and has many of the same elements. The modern painting has a decorative background rather than the battlefield background. It is in the Brooklyn Museum.

== Background ==
The painting is very typical of the style of Kehinde Wiley in that it is a monumental painting that incorporates brocade/decorative motif as an element of the background. It is seen against a rich red background embellished with gold floral motifs.

== Similarities between the two paintings ==
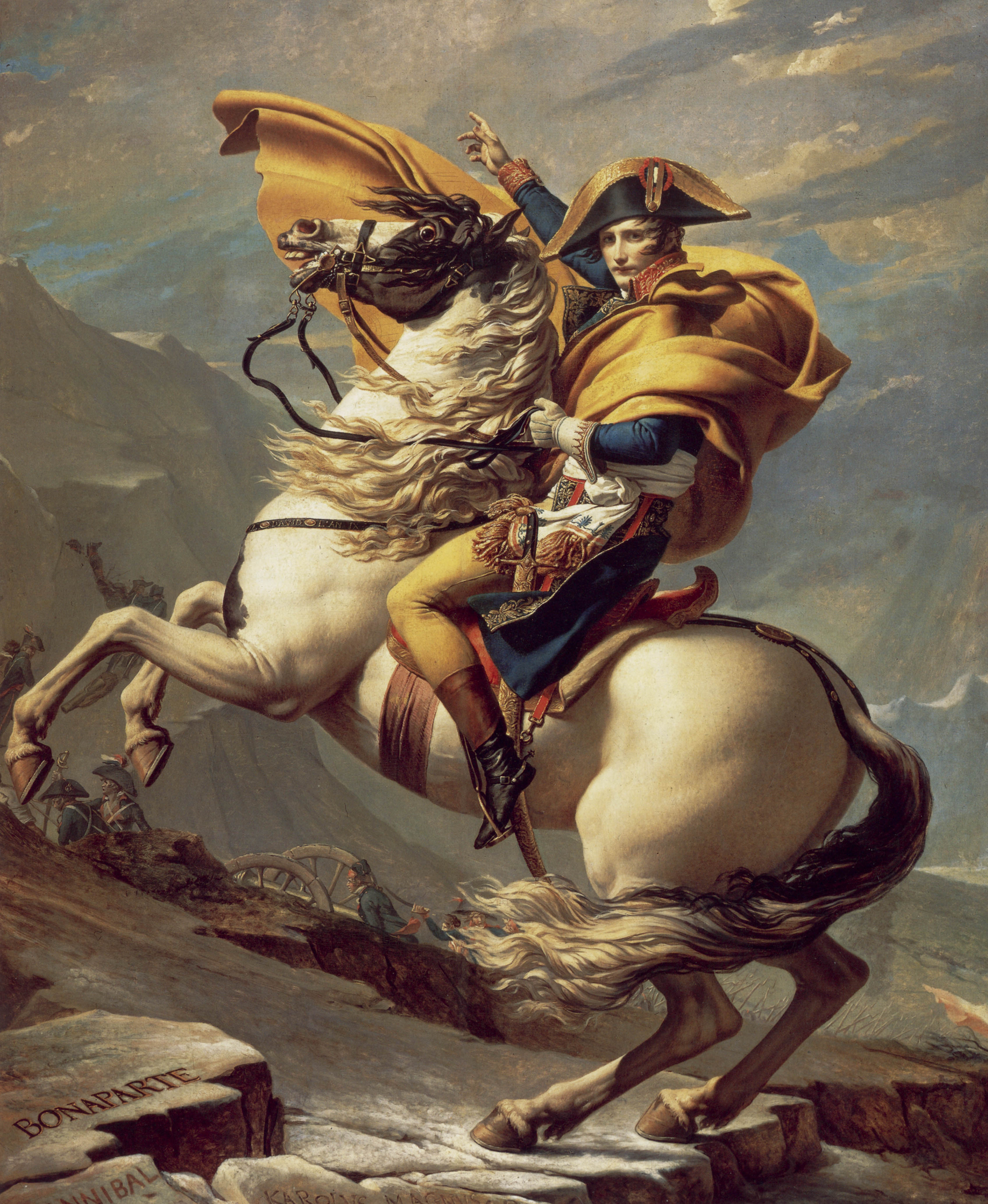
Jacques-Louis David's painting

The basic composition of Wiley's painting is similar to the well-known portrait of Napoleon Bonaparte by Jacques-Louis David, and the two paintings share many elements.
