= Equestrian Portrait of Charles V =

Painting by Titian

- Artist: Titian
- Year: 1548
- Medium: Oil on canvas
- Dimensions: 335 cm × 283 cm (132 in × 111 in)
- Location: Museo del Prado, Madrid

Equestrian Portrait of Charles V (also Emperor Charles V on Horseback or Charles V at Mühlberg) is an oil-on-canvas painting by the Italian Renaissance artist Titian. Created between April and September 1548 while Titian was at the imperial court of Augsburg, it is a tribute to Charles V, Holy Roman Emperor, following his victory in the April 1547 Battle of Mühlberg against the Protestant armies.

The portrait in part gains its impact by its directness and sense of contained power: the horse's strength seems just in check, and Charles' brilliantly shining armour and the painting's deep reds are reminders of battle and heroism. According to Hugh Trevor-Roper, he "does not exult in his victory. He is staid, controlled, pensive, but serene". Titian recorded all of the foreground elements—the horse, its caparison, and the rider's armour—from those used in the actual battle. Both the armour and harness survive, and are kept at the Royal Armoury in Madrid. It was in the Spanish royal collection until transferred to the Museo del Prado in 1827.

== Commission ==
The portrait was commissioned by Charles' sister, Mary of Austria, Queen of Hungary, with Charles specifying how he wished to be presented. The emperor was very aware of the importance of portraiture in determining how he was seen by others, and appreciated not only Titian's mastery as a painter, but also the artist's manner of presenting him as a ruler.

A seated portrait of Charles, of which the prime version is now in Munich, was painted during the same visit. Titian came to know Charles V personally, and had painted other portraits of him by this time. A highly intelligent man, Titian was quick witted, humorous and easy company. He had developed such a strong friendship with Charles by the time of this portrait that the emperor's courtiers were uneasy at the extent that a lowly painter was allowed into his confidence. While in Augsburg, Titian was given an apartment close to Charles' own, and allowed easy access and frequent meetings with the emperor.

During his stay in Augsburg, Titian painted two portraits of Charles V: the equestrian portrait and the seated civilian portrait. Titian described imperial Augsburg as the glory of the world and told his friend Lorenzo Lotto that he was surrounded by all the favours of the court and of the Emperor.

== Description ==
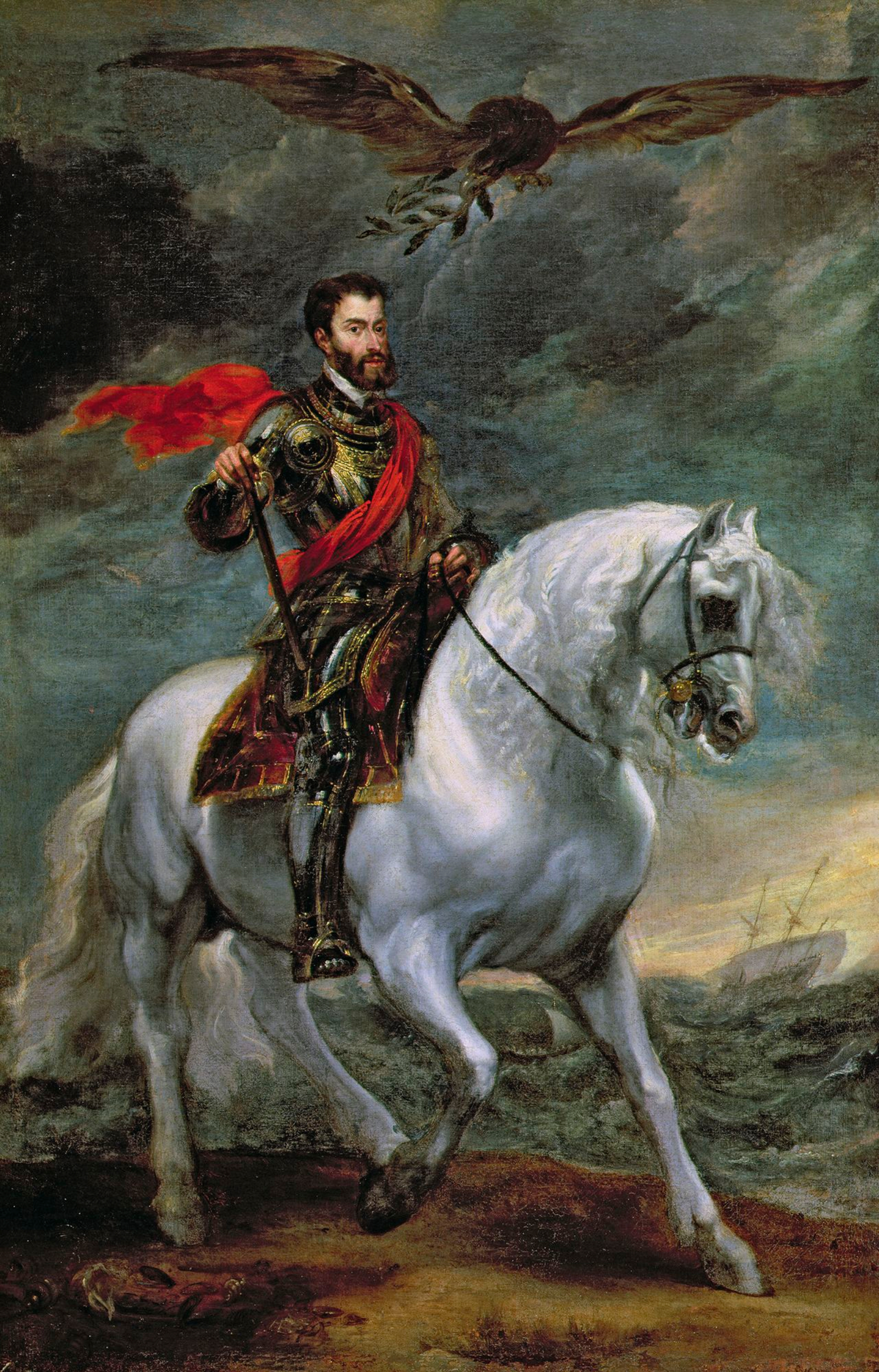
A later Baroque treatment of the subject: Anthony van Dyck's Portrait of Charles V on Horseback (1620)

The painting contains a mix of styles; passages such as the armor and harness display the realism of Titian's early work, while the trees, landscape and sky are built from the broad stretches of colour and strong brushstrokes associated with his work from the 1540s on. It contains surprisingly few iconographic elements, but they are not absent. Pietro Aretino, a contemporary writer whom Titian painted, suggested that he incorporate conventional references to religion and fame. The lance alludes to Saint George, the exemplar of the "traditional image of a military knight-saint". The red around Charles' helmet, his sash and on the horse's trim, represents the Catholic faith in the wars of the 16th century. Titian was so keen to capture such vivid reds that he requested a half pound of red lake be brought from Venice to Augsburg. His instruction reveals that he regarded that pigment "so burning and so splendid...that in comparison the crimson on velvet and silk will become less beautiful".

Drawing on sources such as Roman military art (the statue of Marcus Aurelius on horseback), Renaissance equestrian imagery such as the engravings of Hans Burgkmair, and possibly Dürer's 1513 engraving Knight, Death and the Devil, Titian departs from the traditional rendering of rider on horse, in which one of the horse's front legs is raised (as seen in the gallery of Roman and Renaissance works below). Instead, the horse rears slightly, or may be striking off into a canter, with only its hind legs touching the ground, while Charles still holds the reins lightly, upright but at ease, implying his advanced horsemanship. The influence of the Dürer engraving is subtle. Dürer's knight rides through dark woods, passing figures representing evil and mortality, including a pig-snouted devil and death riding a pale horse. In contrast Charles emerges from a dark wood into an open, though brooding landscape.

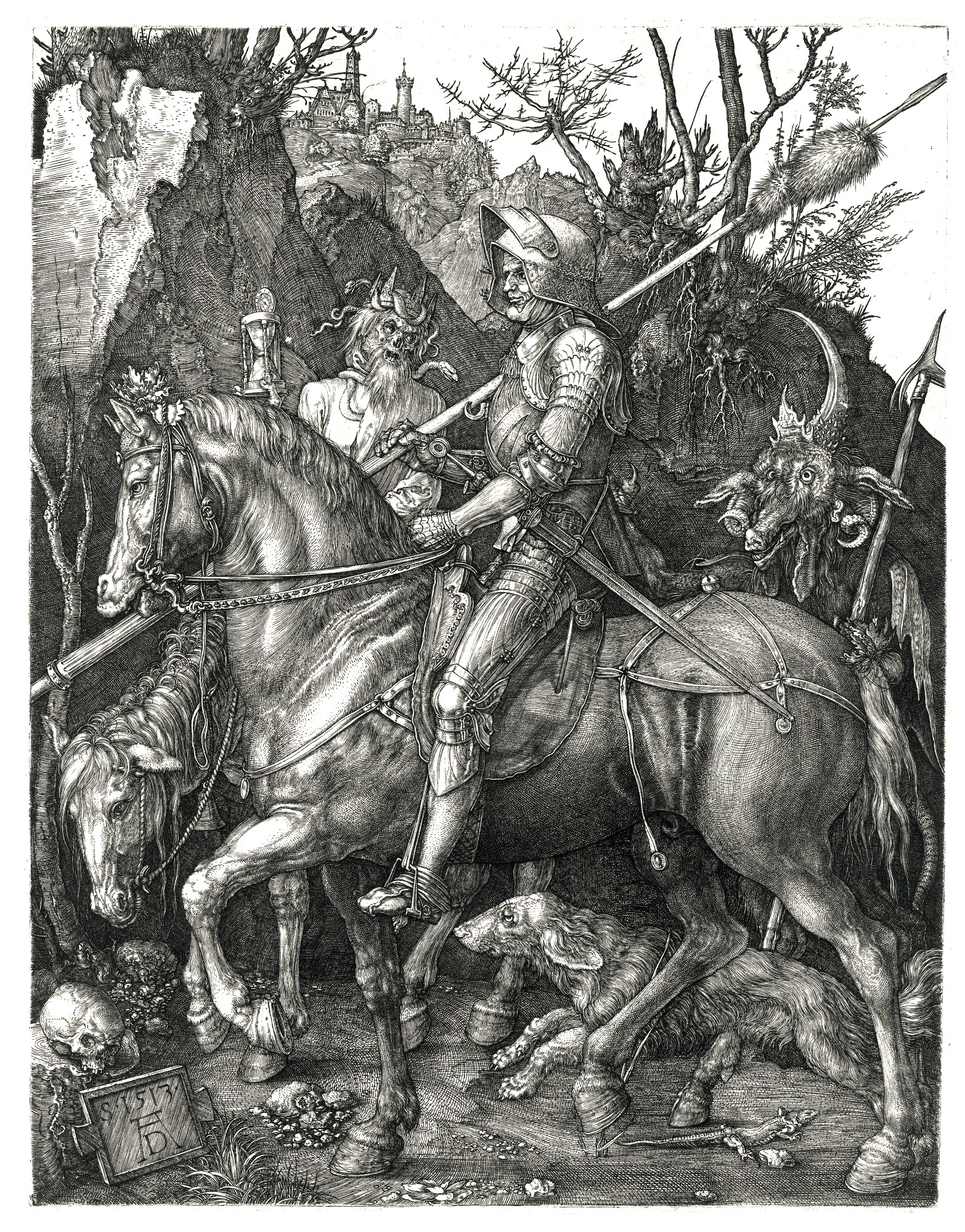
Dürer's Knight, Death and the Devil (1513)

Titian creates a tension between the emperor's age and physical frailty, and his reputation as a forceful and determined, dynamic leader. This is most apparent in the fact that Titian portrays Charles heroically, but places him in a calm dawn setting in which there are no signs of battle. Charles' frailty is underlined by the dark overhead clouds, his weary facial expression and weak jaw (his lower jaw protrudes beyond the line of the upper part), though this is subverted so that it instead conveys his resolve. Charles further suffered from gout, and in reality was carried to the battle in a litter. In the portrait, Titian achieves a feeling of steadiness and control through passages such as the darkly painted wood behind the rider, the evenly clouded sky, and Charles' detached, yet steely, gaze into the distance. The sense of forward motion is suggested by the angle of the spear and charging horse as Charles and mount arrive into the open landscape. The sky also resonates with Charles' victory, but as with the landscape, it also contains dark undertones. The skyscape is considered Titian's best, and has been described as "flaming and shadowed, with gold light fighting with blue, deathly clouds set against a landscape [which] suggests the immensities of space that Charles dominates and the brooding, inner landscape of the soul."

== Influence ==
Many later equestrian portraits of monarchs and rulers display a debt to Titian's depiction of Charles. More obvious and well known works include Anthony van Dyck's 1620 Portrait of Charles I on Horseback which incorporates many of Titian's ideals. Goya's 1812 Equestrian Portrait of the 1st Duke of Wellington expands further, removing the sense of heroism, and presenting a diminished, isolated figure, undersized compared to his mount, almost overwhelmed by the landscape around him, and charging towards a dark skyscape.

== Gallery ==
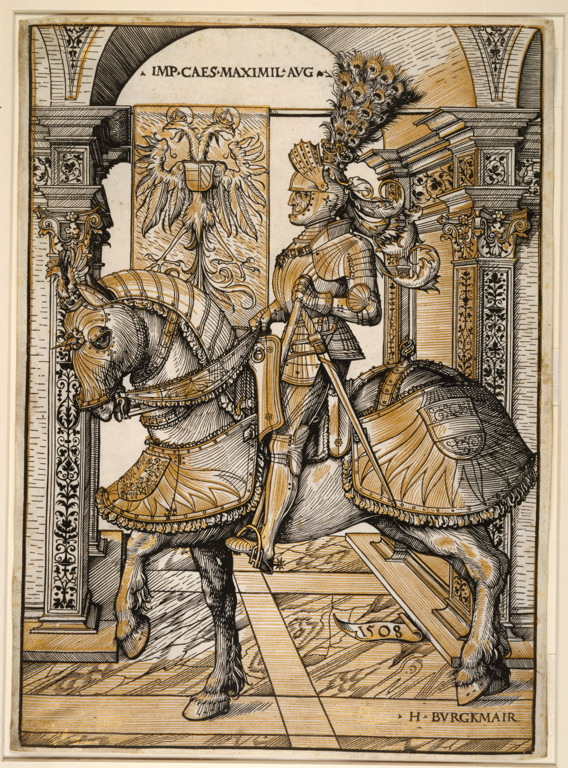
Woodcut by Hans Burgkmair depicting Maximilian I, Holy Roman Emperor (1508)

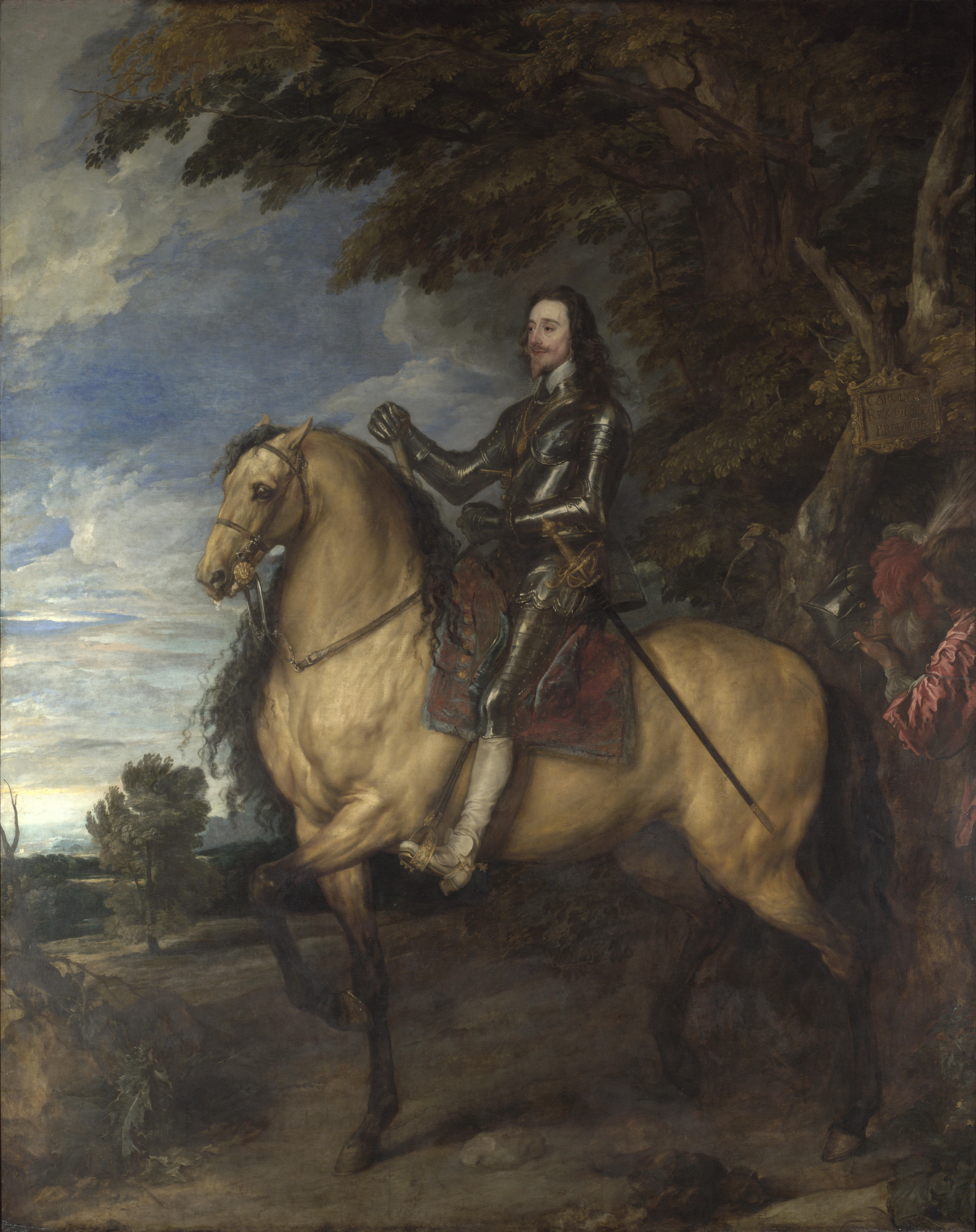
Equestrian Portrait of Charles I, Anthony van Dyck, c. 1637–38

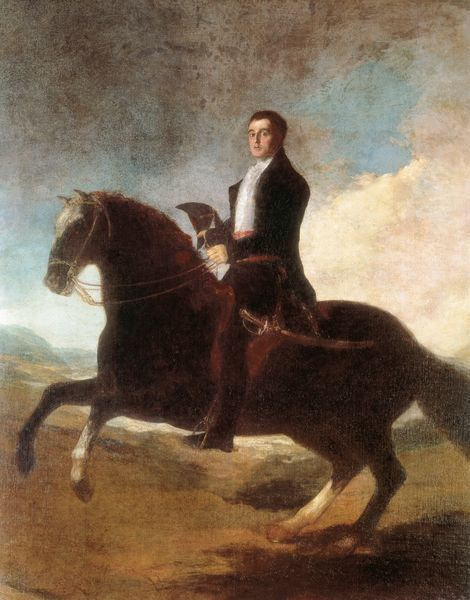
Equestrian Portrait of the 1st Duke of Wellington, Francisco Goya, 1812

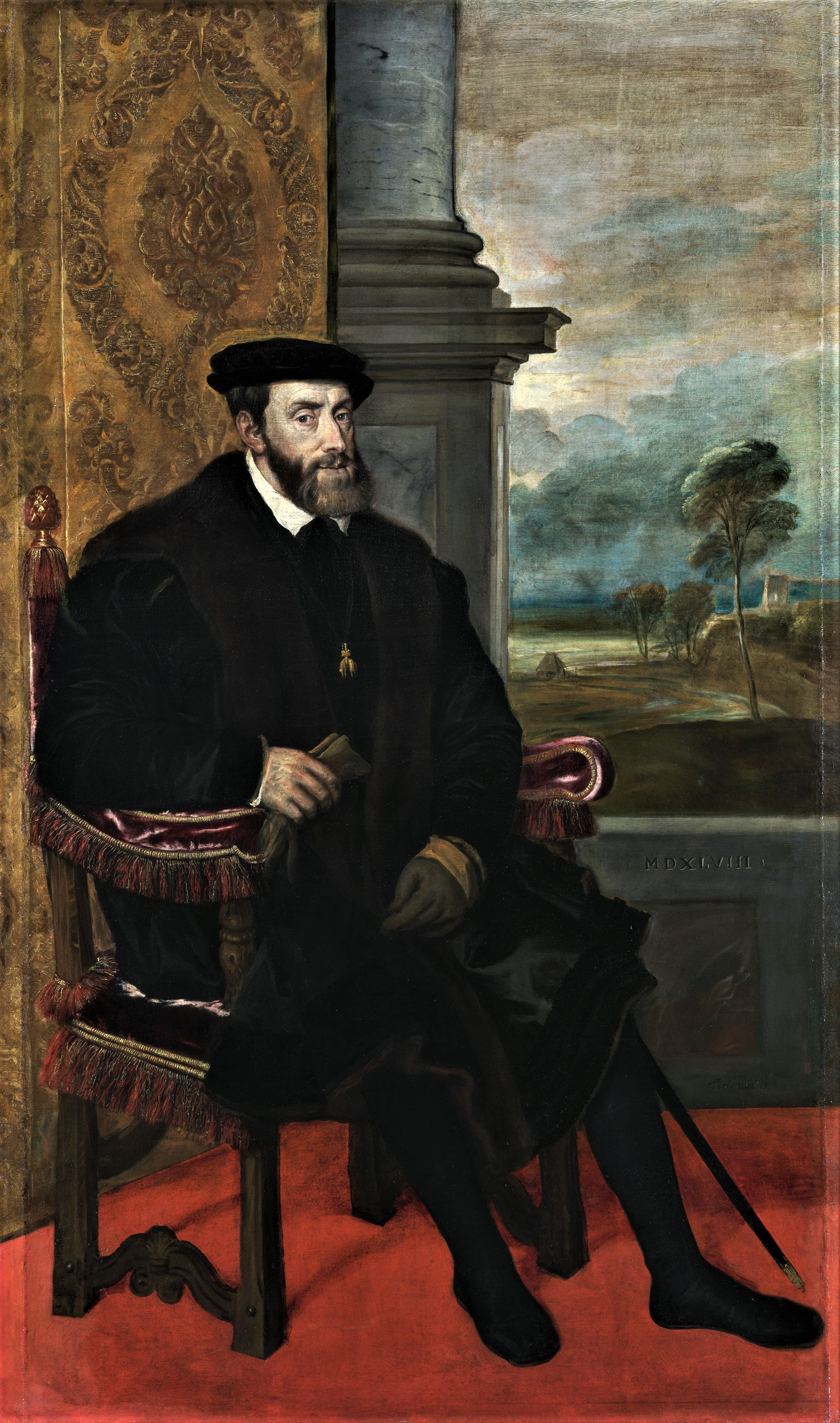
The seated portrait painted in the same period, 1548, Alte Pinakothek, Munich

== See also ==
- List of works by Titian
