= Saint George and the Dragon (Rubens) =

Painting by Peter Paul Rubens

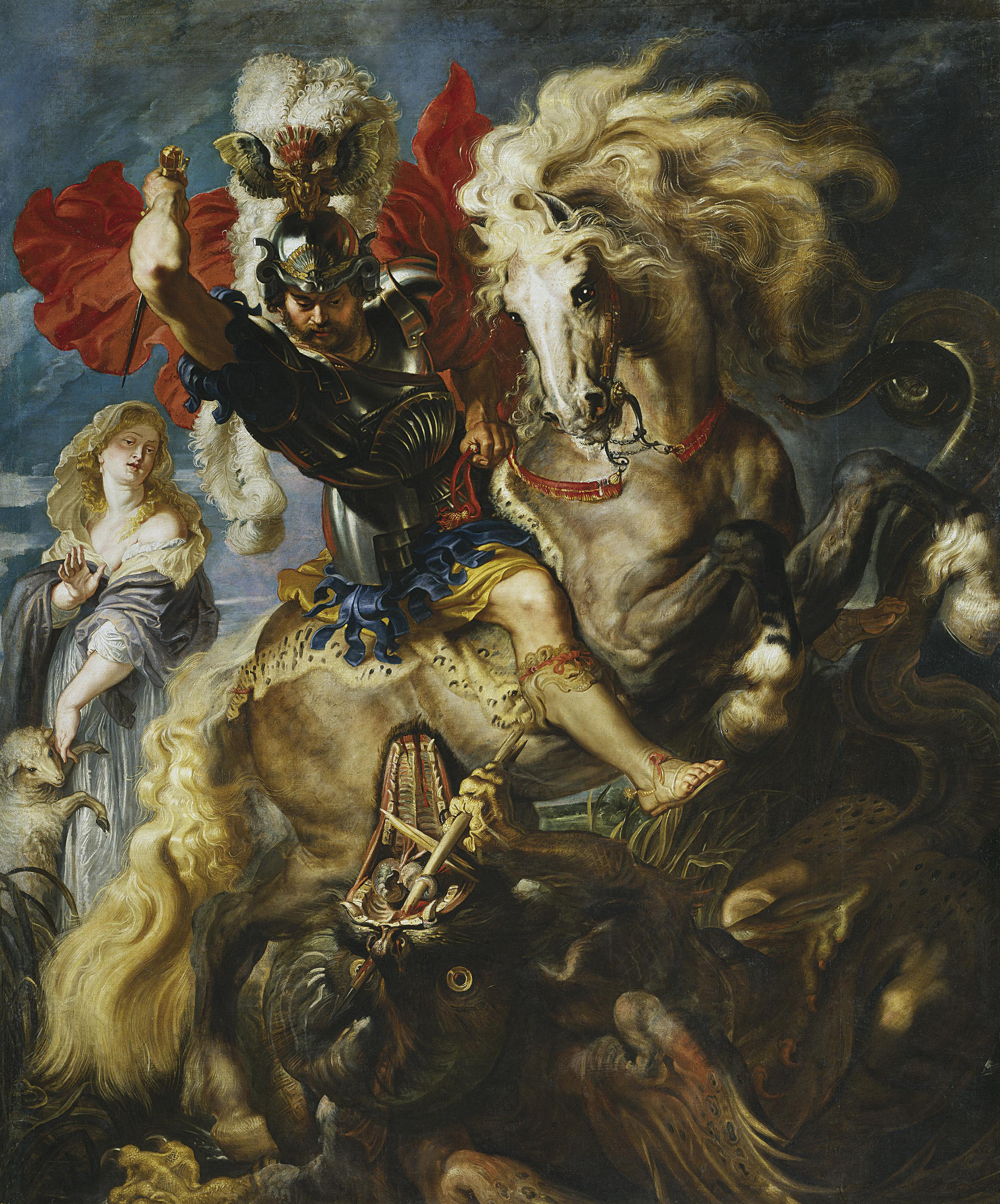
- Artist: Peter Paul Rubens
- Year: ca. 1605–07
- Medium: Oil on canvas
- Dimensions: 309 cm × 257 cm (122 in × 101 in)
- Location: Museo del Prado; Madrid

Saint George and the Dragon is a painting by Peter Paul Rubens (c. 1605–07), based upon the motif with the same name.

It was painted in Genoa (Saint George is the patron of this city) while Rubens was in Italy to complete his artistic training on behalf of his mentor at the time, Otto van Veen. Many scholars speculate the work was originally commissioned for the Church of Sant'Ambrogio, which was dedicated to Saint George. If so, the commissioner never received the masterpiece, due to the artist holding on to his work until he died in 1640, where Felipe IV procured the piece. It is now in the Museo del Prado of Madrid.

== Iconography ==
In the painting the princess represents the church as a whole, and the terrified lamb to whom she offers refuge represents the innocence and purity of Jesus Christ, the "Lamb of God", and Saint George and his steed symbolize the triumph of good over evil as Saint George prepares to strike the beast from “on high”. Saint George's right foot prominently highlighted above the dragon signifies that the dragon (darkness, devil, evil) is in every way beneath Saint George and the light that envelops him and the princess. In opposition, the dragon's form resembles a serpent, rather than the typical lizard, or dinosaur-like depiction of dragons, an allusion to the biblical account of Adam and Eve, wherein Satan takes the form of a serpent.
