= Picturing the Obamas =

American television documentary

- Original language: English
- No. of seasons: 1
- No. of episodes: 2

Production
- Producers: Hannah Brown Ayers; Lance Warren
- Camera setup: Multi-camera
- Running time: 1 hour, 28 minutes
- Production company: Field Studio

Original release
- Network: Smithsonian Channel
- Release: September 10, 2022

Picturing the Obamas is a 2022 two-part documentary television series by the Smithsonian Channel documenting the history of the official portraits of former American President Barack Obama and former first lady Michelle Obama, President Barack Obama and First Lady Michelle Obama, by respective artists Kehinde Wiley and Amy Sherald and the tour of the portraits being displayed in museums in Chicago, Brooklyn, Los Angeles, Atlanta, and Houston. The documentary also examines the impact of the portraits popularity and the legacy of the former president and first lady. The series premiered on September 10, 2022.
