= Michelle Smith (disambiguation) =

Michelle Smith (born 1969) is an Irish swimmer.

Michelle or Michele Smith may also refer to:

- Michelle Smith (born 1949), Canadian co-author of the book Michelle Remembers
- Michele Smith (politician) (born 1955), member of the Chicago City Council
- Michele Smith (softball) (born 1967), American softball player
- Michele Smith (cyclist) (born 1970), Caymanian cyclist
- Michelle Smith (fashion designer) (born 1972 or 1973), American fashion designer
- Michelle Ray Smith (born 1974), American actress and model
- Michele Smith (actress), American actress, model, and TV hostess
- Michelle Smith (sport shooter) (born 1983), English sport shooter
- Michele Smith (music executive), American music executive
- Michelle Smith (hurdler) (born 2006), American sprinter and hurdler
