= Portrait of Emilie Flöge =

1902 painting by Gustav Klimt

- Bildnis Emilie Flöge (German)
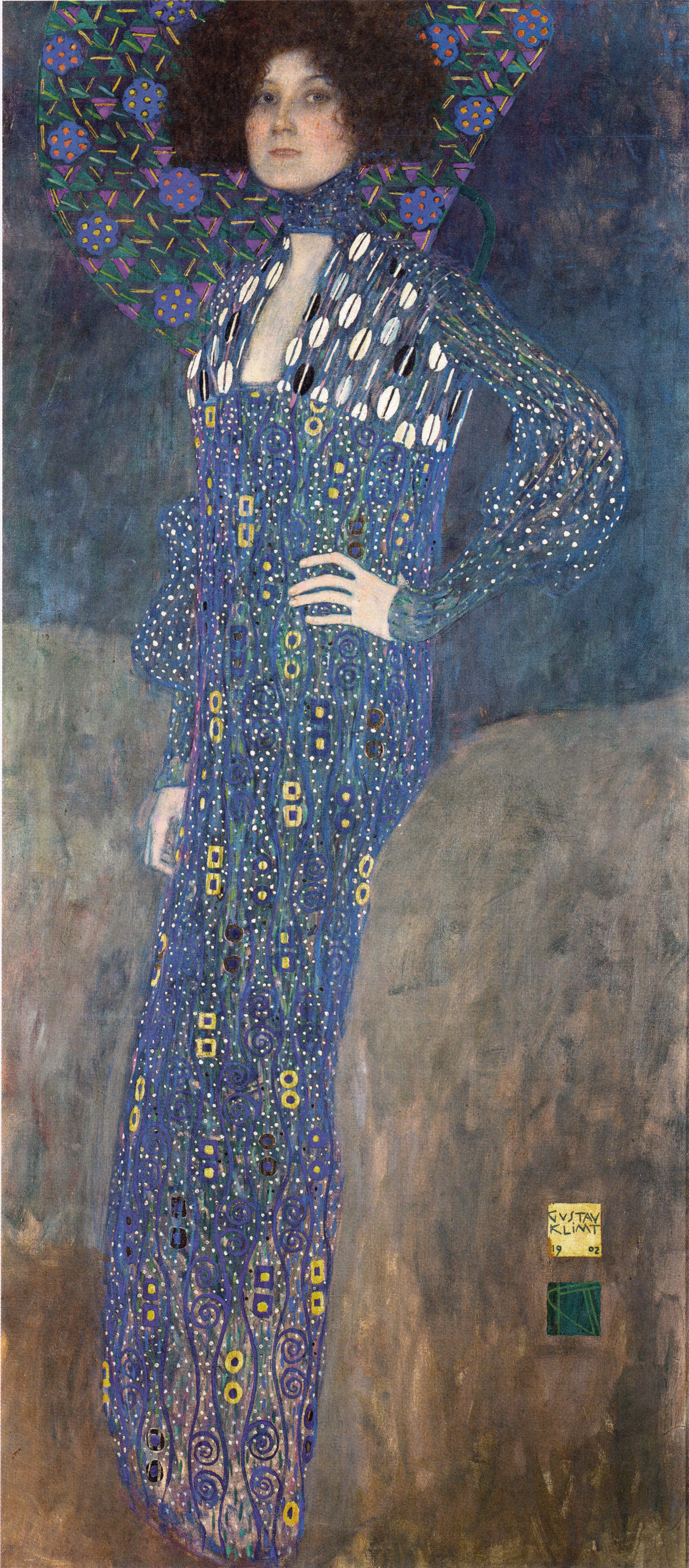
- Artist: Gustav Klimt
- Year: 1902
- Medium: Oil on canvas
- Subject: Emilie Flöge
- Dimensions: 178 cm × 80 cm (70 in × 31 in)
- Weight: 28.5 kilograms (63 lb)
- Location: Vienna Museum, Vienna

Portrait of Emilie Flöge (German: Bildnis Emilie Flöge) is an oil painting on canvas by Austrian painter Gustav Klimt, begun in 1902 and completed by the summer of 1908, when it was acquired by the Lower Austria Museum. The life-size portrait depicts Klimt's close friend and companion Emilie Louise Flöge, a leading Austrian fashion designer and model. Today the painting is held in the Vienna Museum.

== Subject ==
Emilie Flöge was one of Vienna's most successful fashion designers and played a leading role in rethinking women's dress for the modern age. Flöge was Klimt's life companion, and their relationship became one of emotional and intellectual, but not physical, intimacy. The pair likely met when Gustav's brother Ernst Klimt married Emilie's sister, Helene, in 1891. At this time, Emilie was 17 and Gustav was 30. In December 1892, Ernst died and Gustav became the guardian of his baby daughter. He spent much of his time with the Flöge family, staying with them during the summers at Lake Attersee, and became especially close with Emilie. They remained close for the rest of Klimt's life. After Klimt's death in 1918, Flöge maintained a locked room where she kept many of his belongings and hundreds of drawings.

== Description ==
Portrait of Emilie Flöge depicts Flöge wearing a long blue-mottled robe of her own design, decorated with spirals, dots and gold squares. Klimt applied individual decorative pieces in genuine silver and gold leaf. The dress is a typical example of ‘reform dress' (Reformkleid): artistic, free-flowing clothing that offered a radical alternative to corsets and conventional women's fashion of the period. Set against an unspecified blue-green background, Flöge’s elongated, two-dimensional figure and decorative dress contrast sharply with her naturalistic facial features. The pattern of green, red and blue flowers behind her head reinforces the ornamental effect, which, according to Angela Wenzel, may resemble a Japanese leaf fan. Wenzel writes that this visually balances the prominent form in the foreground. Klimt had already employed this device in his Portrait of Sonja Knips (1898), and he would continue to use it in subsequent works, culminating with Portrait of Adele Bloch-Bauer I (1907).

Of the two squares in the lower right, one contains Klimt's signature and date, and the other his monogram. Art historian Frank Whitford noted these motifs recall Japanese signature seals, and that the painting as a whole shows the influence of Japanese woodblock prints of women wearing richly patterned kimonos. Klimt dated the portrait 1902, when Flöge was twenty-eight years old; however, he did not consider it finished.

Whitford notes that Portrait of Emilie Flöge provides evidence of a significant shift in Klimt's work "towards a highly individual, intricately decorated style". As Klimt was close to the sitter and the portrait was not a commission, he was free to abandon the conventions of his earlier work that he still observed in more formal portraits. This allowed him to focus instead on the decorative aspects of the composition. Klimt would not produce another portrait in this style for several years. The painting's overall impression is defined by the interplay of colour and decorative structure.

== Reception and history ==
Portrait of Emilie Flöge was first exhibited in November 1903 at the eighteenth exhibition of the Vienna Secession, titled the Klimt Kollektiv. It was listed as Bildnis einer Dame (Portrait of a lady). The portrait was considered provocatively modern and radical for its time. In 1903, art critic Ludwig Hevesi praised the portrait as reflecting a "blue-coloured world of majolica and mosaic". Art critic Berta Zuckerkandl noted that "Around the head, there is a green-blue wreath of blossoms with all the colour mysticism of Byzantine backgrounds." Many women in Viennese upper-class society who liked the portrait visited Klimt and Emilie's studios to commission similar dresses and portraits.

Neither Flöge nor Klimt were fully satisfied with the painting. Klimt felt he had failed to capture Flöge's charm, and her family likewise disliked the work, declining to hang it. However, this fact is disputed by some art historians. Flöge's family likely would have preferred to see her depicted according to the academic taste of the time. Klimt promised to paint another portrait of Flöge, but he never did. In 1904, Klimt responded to a purchase request from the Imperial and Royal Ministry of Culture Education, offering to sell the painting for 10,000 Kronen once it was fully completed. However, the sale did not take place, likely due to the painting's high price. The painting was exhibited among others of Klimt's work at the 1908 Kunstschau exhibition.

Klimt had completed the painting by the summer of 1908 at the latest, when he sold it to the Lower Austria Museum for 12,000 Kronen. When Vienna became its own province in 1921, the painting was transferred to the city's municipal collections. In 2012, the Vienna Museum dubbed it one of Klimt's "masterpieces". It remains on permanent display in the museum's collection.

== See also ==
- List of paintings by Gustav Klimt
