= The Kiss (Klimt) =

Painting by Gustav Klimt

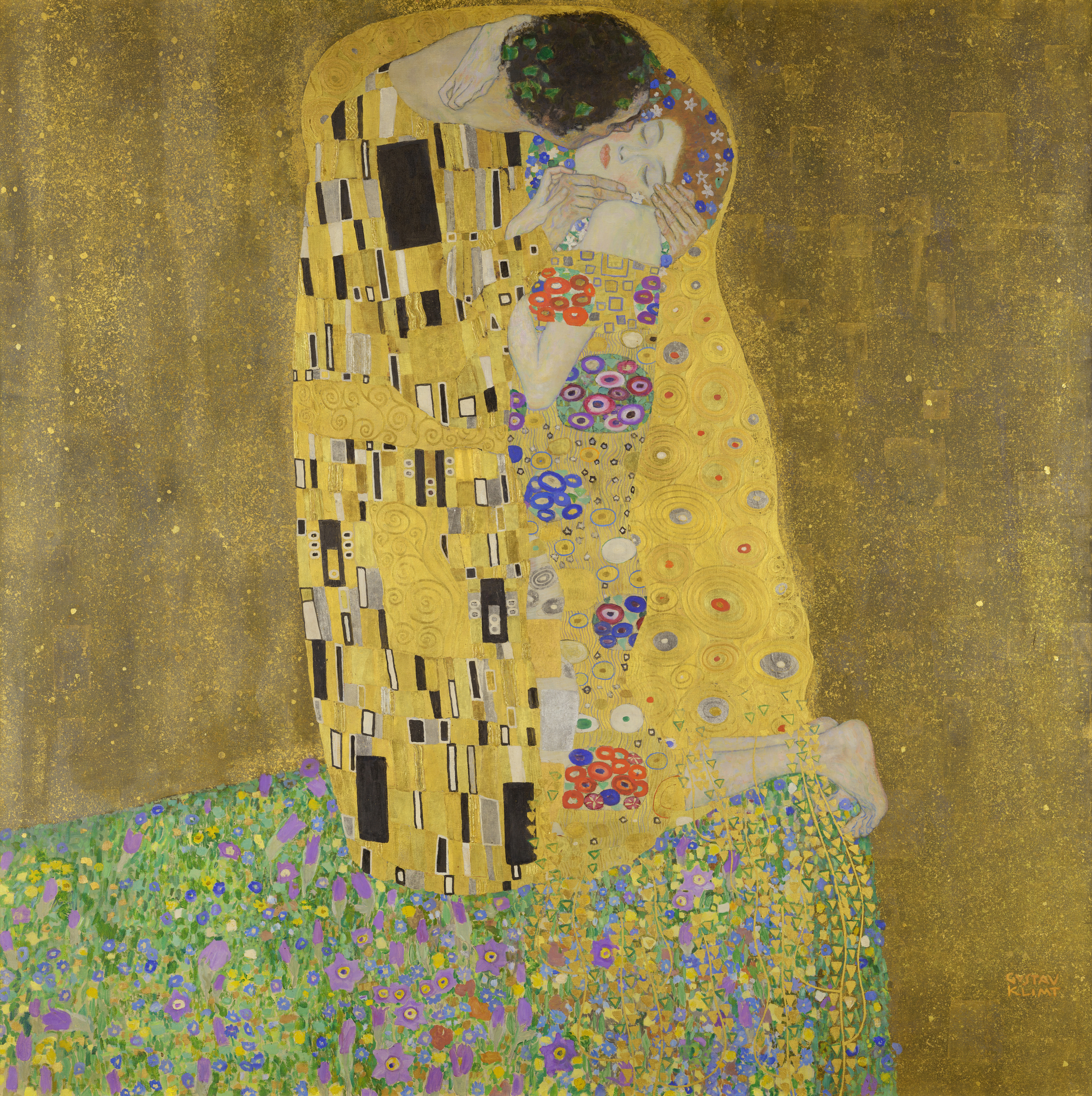
- Artist: Gustav Klimt
- Year: 1907–1908
- Medium: Oil and gold leaf on canvas
- Dimensions: 180 cm × 180 cm (71 in × 71 in)
- Location: Österreichische Galerie Belvedere, Vienna, Austria

The Kiss (German: Der Kuss) is an oil-on-canvas painting with added gold leaf, silver and platinum by the Austrian Symbolist painter Gustav Klimt. It was painted at some point in 1907 and 1908, during the height of what scholars call his "Golden Period". It was exhibited in 1908 under the title Liebespaar (the lovers) as stated in the catalogue of the exhibition. The painting depicts a couple embracing each other, their bodies entwined in elaborate robes decorated in a style influenced by the contemporary Art Nouveau style and the organic forms of the earlier Arts and Crafts movement.

The painting now hangs in the Österreichische Galerie Belvedere museum in the Upper Belvedere Palace in Vienna, and is considered a masterpiece of Vienna Secession – the local variation of Art Nouveau – and probably Klimt's most important work.

== Background ==
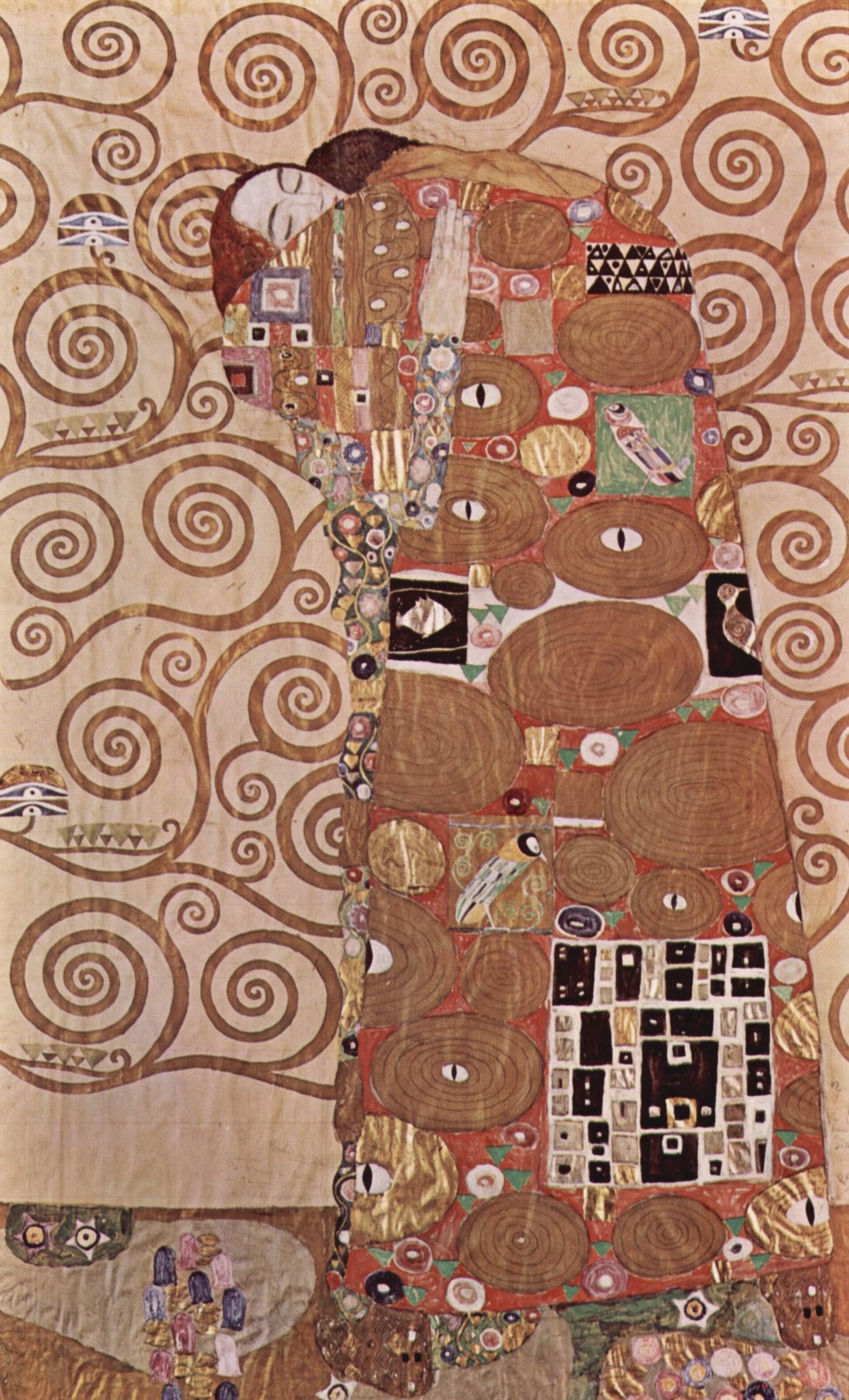
Fulfilment, a sketch for the 1905–09 Brussels Stoclets

Love, intimacy, and sexuality are common themes found in Gustav Klimt's works. The Stoclet Frieze and the Beethoven Frieze are such examples of Klimt's focus on romantic intimacy. Both works are precursors to The Kiss and feature the recurring motif of an embracing couple.

It is thought that Klimt and his companion Emilie Flöge modeled for the work, while others have speculated it was Austrian composer Alma Mahler, but there is no evidence or record to prove this. Others suggest the female was the model known as 'Red Hilda'; she bears strong resemblance to the model in his Woman with Hat and Feather Boa, Goldfish and Danaë.

== Description ==
Gustav Klimt depicts the couple locked in an intimate embrace against a gold, flat background. The two figures are situated at the edge of a patch of flowery meadow that ends under the woman's exposed feet. The man wears a robe printed with geometric patterns and subtle swirls. He wears a crown of vines while the woman wears a crown of flowers. She is shown in a flowing dress with floral patterns. The man's face is not shown to the audience and instead, his face is bent downward to press a kiss to the woman's cheek, and his hands are cradling the woman's face. Her eyes are closed, with one arm wrapped around the man's neck, the other resting gently on his hand, and her face is upturned to receive the man's kiss.

The patterns in the painting suggests the style of Art Nouveau and the organic forms of the Arts and Crafts movement. At the same time, the background evokes the conflict between two- and three-dimensionality intrinsic to the work of Degas and other modernists. Paintings such as The Kiss are visual manifestations of fin-de-siecle spirit because they capture a decadence conveyed by opulent and sensuous images. The use of gold leaf recalls medieval gold-ground paintings, illuminated manuscripts, earlier mosaics, and the spiral patterns in the clothes recall Bronze Age art and the decorative tendrils seen in Western art since before classical times. The man's head ends very close to the top of the canvas, a departure from traditional Western canons that reflects the influence of Japanese prints, as does the painting's simplified composition.

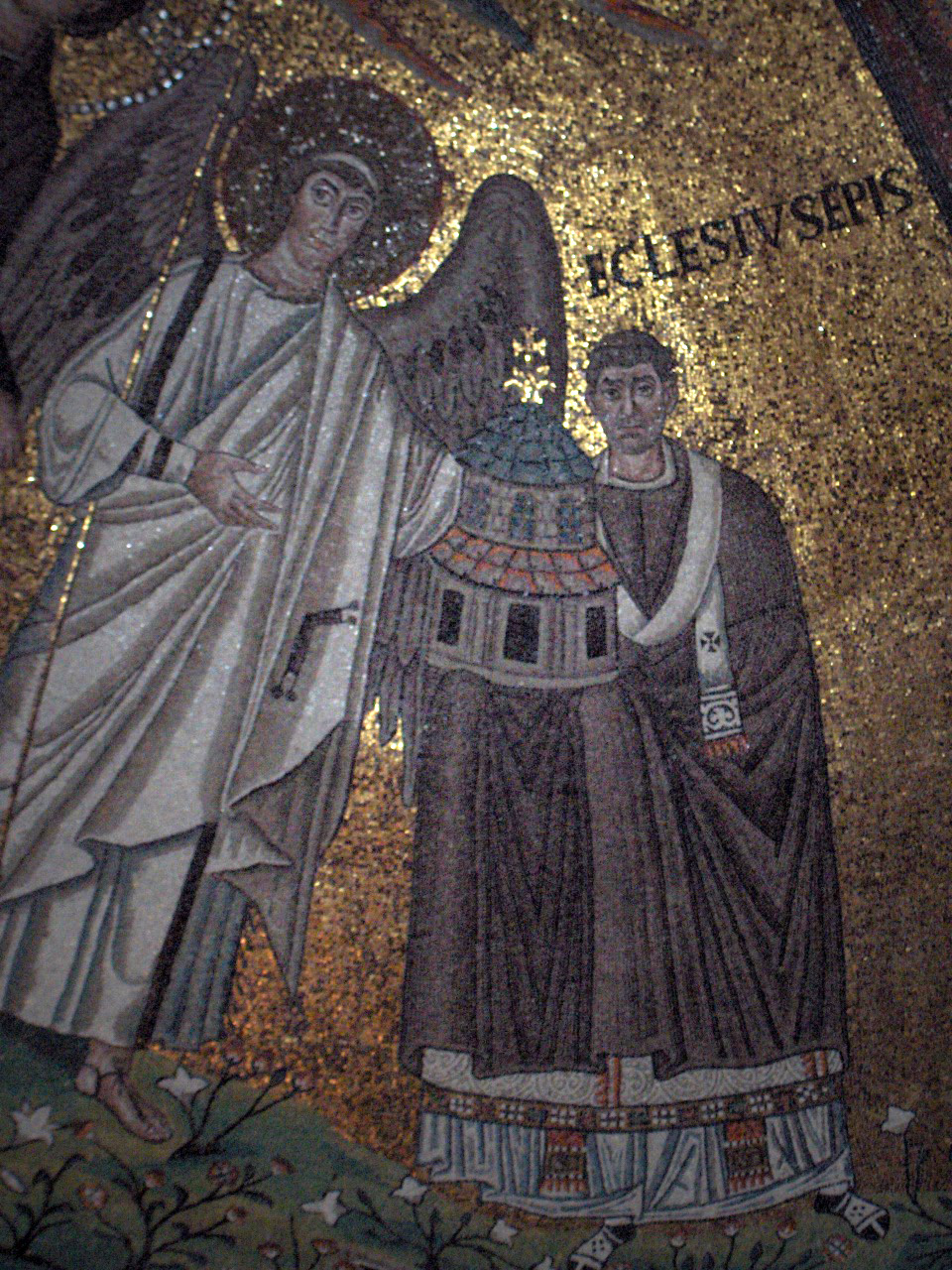
Cupola of the choir: An Angel Offers a Model of The Church to Bishop Ecclesius, Basilica of San Vitale in Ravenna, Italy

Klimt's father was a traveling artisan specializing in gold engravings, but Klimt's use of gold leaf in paintings was inspired by a trip he made to Italy in 1903. When he visited Ravenna he saw the Byzantine mosaics in the Church of San Vitale. For Klimt, the flatness of the mosaics and their lack of perspective and depth only enhanced their golden brilliance, and he started to make unprecedented use of gold and silver leaf in his own work.

It has also been argued that in this picture Klimt represented the moment Apollo kisses Daphne, following the Metamorphoses of Ovid narrative.

Art historians have also suggested that Klimt depicts the tale of Orpheus and Eurydice. More specifically, Klimt seems to be showing the exact moment when Orpheus turns around to caress Eurydice and loses his love forever. As shown in this painting, the woman being held is slightly translucent, indicating a fading away or disappearance—as told in the story.

== Reception ==
Klimt painted The Kiss soon after his three-part Vienna Ceiling series, which created a scandal and were criticized as both "pornographic" and evidence of "perverted excess". The works had recast the artist as an enfant terrible for his anti-authoritarian and anti-popularist views on art. He wrote, "If you can not please everyone with your deeds and your art, please a few".

The Kiss was exhibited in 1908 in Vienna in the Kunstschau – the building created in collaboration by Josef Hoffmann, Gustav Klimt, Otto Prutscher, Koloman Moser and many others, to coincide with the celebrations in Vienna for the sixtieth anniversary of Emperor Francis Joseph I’s reign from 1 June to 16 November 1908.

The Kiss, however, was enthusiastically received, and was purchased, still unfinished, by the Austrian government when it was put on public exhibition.

In February 2013, Syrian artist Tammam Azzam superimposed an image of the painting onto a bombed building in an unidentified part of Syria, in a work called Freedom Graffiti, to call attention to the plight of war in his country.

== See also ==
- List of paintings by Gustav Klimt
