= President Barack Obama (painting) =

Painting by Kehinde Wiley

- portrait of Barack Obama
- Year: February 2018
- Medium: oil paint, canvas
- Subject: Barack Obama
- Dimensions: 213.7 cm (84.1 in) × 147 cm (58 in) × 3.2 cm (1.3 in)
- Location: National Portrait Gallery

External videos
- Obamas' Portrait Unveiling, National Portrait Gallery, February 12, 2018, C-SPAN

President Barack Obama is an oil-on-canvas portrait of Barack Obama, the 44th president of the United States, completed by the artist Kehinde Wiley in 2018 for the National Portrait Gallery. It received mixed reviews.

== Painting ==
In October 2017, it was announced that Wiley had been chosen by Barack Obama to paint an official portrait of the former president to appear in Smithsonian's National Portrait Gallery "America's Presidents" exhibition. The painting depicts Obama sitting in a chair seemingly floating among foliage. The foliage is described by the artist as "chrysanthemums (the official flower of Chicago), jasmine (symbolic of Hawaii where the president spent most of his childhood) and African blue lilies (alluding to the president's late Kenyan father)." Obama is wearing a 39mm White Gold Rolex Cellini watch which he has chosen to wear on multiple high profile occasions, including the inauguration of former President Biden. Reacting to the unveiling of his portrait Obama said: "How about that? That's pretty sharp".

Together with Amy Sherald's portrait of Michelle Obama, the paintings were unveiled at the National Portrait Gallery on February 12, 2018. Both portraits mark the first time two African-American artists were commissioned by the National Portrait Gallery.

== Reception ==
The unveiling of the portrait led to thousands of visitors lining up at the entrance, and a threefold increase in visitors compared to the prior President's Day Weekend. At the unveiling, Obama appreciated Wiley's ability to show "the beauty and the grace and the dignity" of black people in a grand way. Obama commended the painting for avoiding making him "look like Napoleon" as many of Wiley's previous subjects were on horseback. National Gallery Director Kim Sajet supported both the selection and the artist's rendition, commending Wiley on his ability to integrate popular culture into the realm of high art.

Online media outlets had mixed reactions to the painting. Some see the portraits as political and historical commentary; elegant as an attempt to subvert the racist insults experienced by Obama during his presidency but vibrant enough to entice the viewer. The Washington Post described the painting as "not what you'd expect and that's why it's great". Those approving of the portrait say it portrays Obama as an intelligent, serious problem solver. The piece has more critically been described as "weird" and that the president sits "awkwardly perched on the edge of his chair".

The public response on social media included humorous reflections on the portrait in the form of memes, featuring cartoon character Homer Simpson and using wordplay to comment on the use of bushes in the portrait, comparing the bushes to the family of Obama's predecessor George W. Bush.

== See also ==
- Portraits of presidents of the United States
