= First Lady Michelle Obama (painting) =

Portrait of Michelle Obama by Amy Sherald

- Portrait of Michelle Obama
- Artist: Amy Sherald
- Year: 2018
- Medium: oil paint, linen
- Subject: Michelle Obama
- Dimensions: 183.2 cm (72.1 in) × 152.7 cm (60.1 in) × 7 cm (2.8 in)
- Location: National Portrait Gallery
- Accession: PA/NPG.18-57
- Website: npg.si.edu/exhibition/former-first-lady-michelle-obama-artist-amy-sherald

External videos
- Obamas' Portrait Unveiling, National Portrait Gallery, February 12, 2018, C-SPAN

First Lady Michelle Obama, initially titled Michelle LaVaughn Robinson Obama, is a portrait of former First Lady of the United States Michelle Obama, painted by the artist Amy Sherald. Unveiled in 2018, it hangs in the National Portrait Gallery (NPG) in Washington, D.C. The six-by-five-foot (1.8 by 1.5 m) oil-on-linen painting shows Obama, rendered in Sherald's signature grisaille, resting her chin lightly on her hand, as a geometric print dress flows outward filling the frame against a sky-blue background.

Praised by critics and immensely popular with museum visitors, the National Portrait Gallery's attendance doubled in the two years after the unveiling of Sherald's portrait along with Kehinde Wiley's portrait of President Barack Obama. Museum director Kim Sajet credits Sherald and Wiley with reinvigorating the genre of portrait painting. Sherald and Wiley were also the first African American artists to receive commissions for National Portrait Gallery presidential portraits.

== Background ==
In 2017, for her portrait for the National Portrait Gallery, former First Lady Michelle Obama chose the artist Amy Sherald, who like Obama is African American. Both the President and First Lady met with Sherald as a candidate to paint their respective portraits, but Sherald and Michelle Obama had an immediate connection. Obama described the meeting:

Within the first few minutes of our conversation, I knew she was the one for me. And maybe it was the moment she came in and she looked at Barack and she said, 'Well, Mr. President, I'm really excited to be here, and I know I'm being considered for both portraits,' she said, 'but, Mrs. Obama' – she physically turned to me and she said – 'I'm really hoping you and I can work together.'

Sherald, who is from Columbus, Georgia, and then living in Baltimore, was 43 and a rising star in the art world. Just a few years prior she had still been waiting tables to pay the bills, but in 2016 her painting Miss Everything (Unsuppressed Deliverance) won the National Portrait Gallery's Outwin Boochever Portrait Competition. The citation praised her "innovative, dynamic portraits that, through color and form, confront the psychological effects of stereotypical imagery on African-American subjects". Sherald was the first woman and first African American to win the competition. Sherald and Kehinde Wiley, the artist President Barack Obama selected for his portrait, became the first African American artists commissioned to paint presidential portraits for the National Portrait Gallery.

Obama, with input from Sherald, also selected her dress for the sitting, choosing a design from the Spring 2017 collection of the line Milly by fashion designer Michelle Smith. Obama and her stylist Meredith Koop had worked with Smith previously, including for an Essence magazine cover shoot. Smith pulled the dress from production so it would be unique to Obama and worked with the team remotely to tailor the design for her, but the final wardrobe selection was not revealed until the painting's unveiling ceremony at the National Portrait Gallery.

== Creative process ==
Sherald, whose signature grayscale is influenced in part by the black-and-white photographs of Black people that W.E.B. DuBois showed at the 1900 Paris Exposition, spent two 90-minute sessions photographing Obama, then painted from the photographs. Sherald noted she felt struck by how much Obama resembled her daughter Malia in Sherald's photographs.

While Sherald typically does not take individual portrait commissions and instead selects sitters for her portraits from the people she meets in her everyday life, she felt Obama shared the relatability and authentic presence of her past sitters: common people "just being themselves." Sherald sought to portray these traits, significant as the qualities that made Obama feel accessible to ordinary people.

The Obamas as well as officials from the National Portrait Gallery saw photographs of the painting while it was still a work in progress, but made no requests for adjustments to the portrait, leaving complete creative control to Sherald.

Sherald initially titled the painting Michelle LaVaughn Robinson Obama.

== Style ==
The portrait is a large oil painting on linen, standing 6 ft (1.8 m) tall and 5 ft (1.5 m) wide.

Obama's face, as well as her visible arms and hands, are stylized in shades of gray, an artistic technique known as grisaille, a key theme in works by Sherald. Of the choice to use grayscale instead of color in painting skin, Sherald said the intention was to resist reductive readings of race that placed the sitter in a box: "To me when you see brown skin, it tends to codify something. So through the gray you're almost allowed to look past that into the real person." The background is a simple blue evoking American folk art.

Art and architecture critic Philip Kennicott described Sherald's portrait as portraying Obama with "a curious mix of confidence and vulnerability." He described the juxtaposition of Obama's face, painted "in the gray tones of an old black-and-white photograph," with the vibrant "robin's egg blue background" as a technique Sherald often uses to impart "a heightened sense of the surreal."

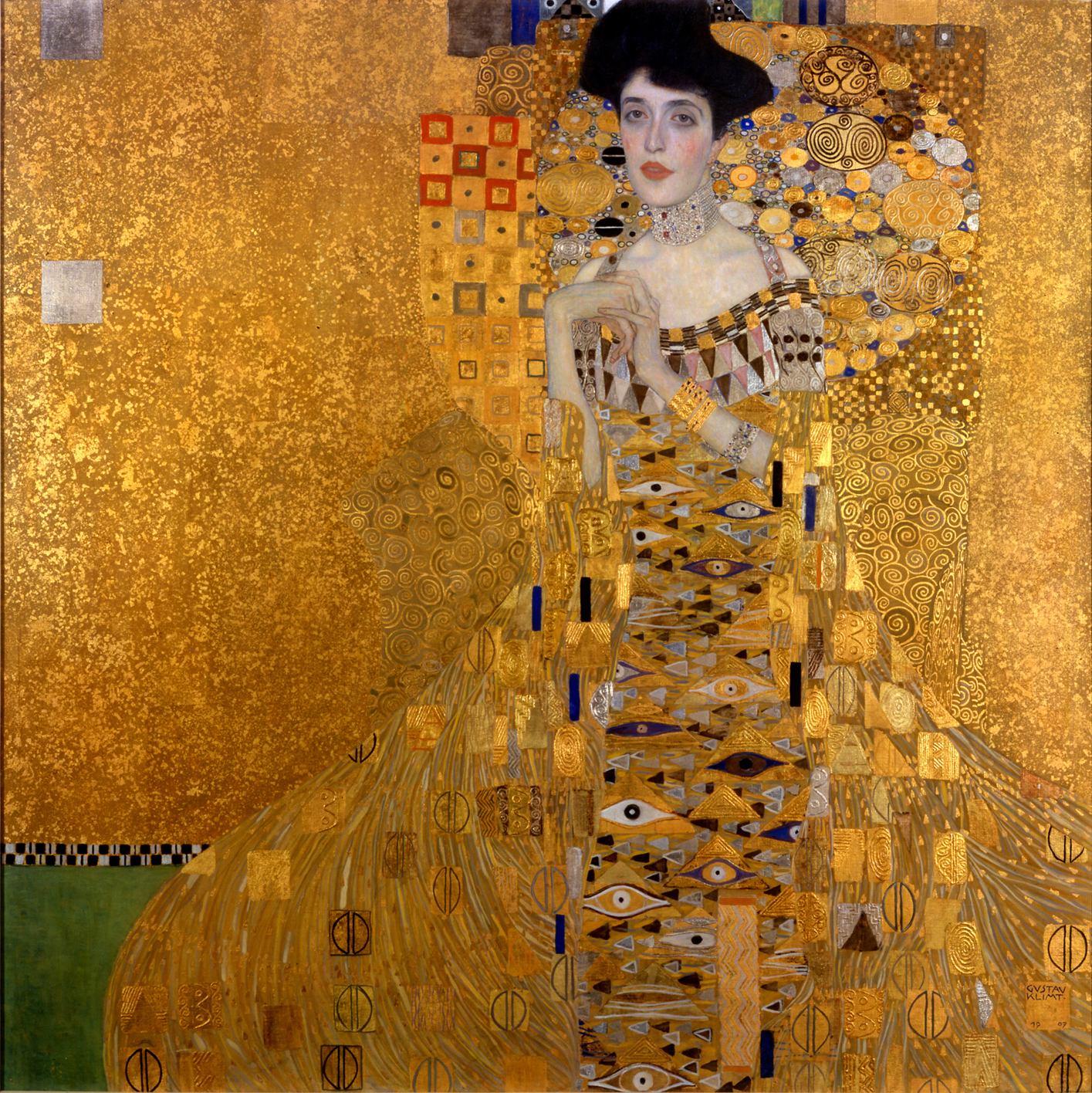
Portrait of Adele Bloch-Bauer I by Gustav Klimt

The dress dominates the work as a mountain-like triangle. A full-length halter gown with a modern geometric pattern from the American womenswear line Milly, the dress struck designer Michelle Smith as appropriate to the occasion both because its style reflected the way Obama dresses in her daily life and because, to Smith, the material and design symbolized Obama's contemporary sensibilities in her life overall: "It's made of a stretch cotton poplin print in a clean, minimal, geometric print without a reference to anything past or nostalgic, which gives the dress a very forward-thinking sensibility – this is very Michelle Obama." Elements of the portrait have been noted by art critics to have been influenced by Gustav Klimt, in particular the Portrait of Adele Bloch-Bauer I. One commentator noted the similarity to fashion designed by Klimt's muse Emilie Louise Flöge.

A Gee's Bend quilter at work

By contrast Sherald said the dress reminded her of the works of 20th century Dutch painter Piet Mondrian and the African-American quilting tradition of Gee's Bend, Alabama, a community descended from formerly enslaved African Americans. Sherald felt it echoed the Gee's Bend tradition of "composing quilts in geometries that transform clothes and fabric remnants into masterpieces."

Writing in The New Yorker, art critic Peter Schjeldahl remarked on his first impression, viewing the piece in reproduction, of the "immense cotton gown [...] which fills most of the canvas that isn't taken up by a light-blue ground." Initially it seemed to him to be "an overwhelming of the wearer by the worn." His impression changed completely after seeing the work in person and he urged readers: "You must – and I mean absolutely have to – see Sherald's work in person, if at all possible. Taking in the painting's scale [...] and the sensitive suavity of its brushwork (a tissue of touches, each a particular decision)," Schjeldahl came to a widely shared critical conclusion that Sherald had captured the essential qualities and challenges of Michelle Obama's role and identity: "I decided that artist and sitter had achieved a mind meld, to buoyant effect. The dress amounts to a symbol of Michelle's public role – a tall order for anyone – and the éclat with which she performs it."

== Exhibition and reception ==
Together with Wiley's portrait of President Barack Obama, the paintings were first exhibited at the National Portrait Gallery beginning February 12, 2018. Sherald's portrait drew strong reaction, with some commentators complaining that they felt it did not look like Obama. Sherald responded with an analogy: "Some people like their poetry to rhyme. Some people don't."

Cultural critic Doreen St. Félix agreed that the portrait departed from photorealism – "The mouth and the eyes and the strong arms that we know are present, but fainter. From some distance, I can imagine, the figure might not be immediately recognizable." – but felt this choice was integral to the image's success as a portrait of this sitter, by compelling the viewer to "work to bring its subject to life – to remember what Michelle Obama has endured."

Art critics generally praised the work: in New York, Jerry Saltz wrote a review declaring, "The Obamas' Official Portraits Rise to the Occasion." In The New Yorker, Schjeldahl called Sherald's piece "a tour de force within the constraint imposed by a political commission." The director of the National Portrait Gallery, Kim Sajet, credited Sherald and Wiley for reinvigorating portrait painting as an artistic genre: "Portraiture used to be seen as this old-fashioned, fuddy-duddy, really for dead white people kind of way of painting ... and they've completely changed that and put it on its head."

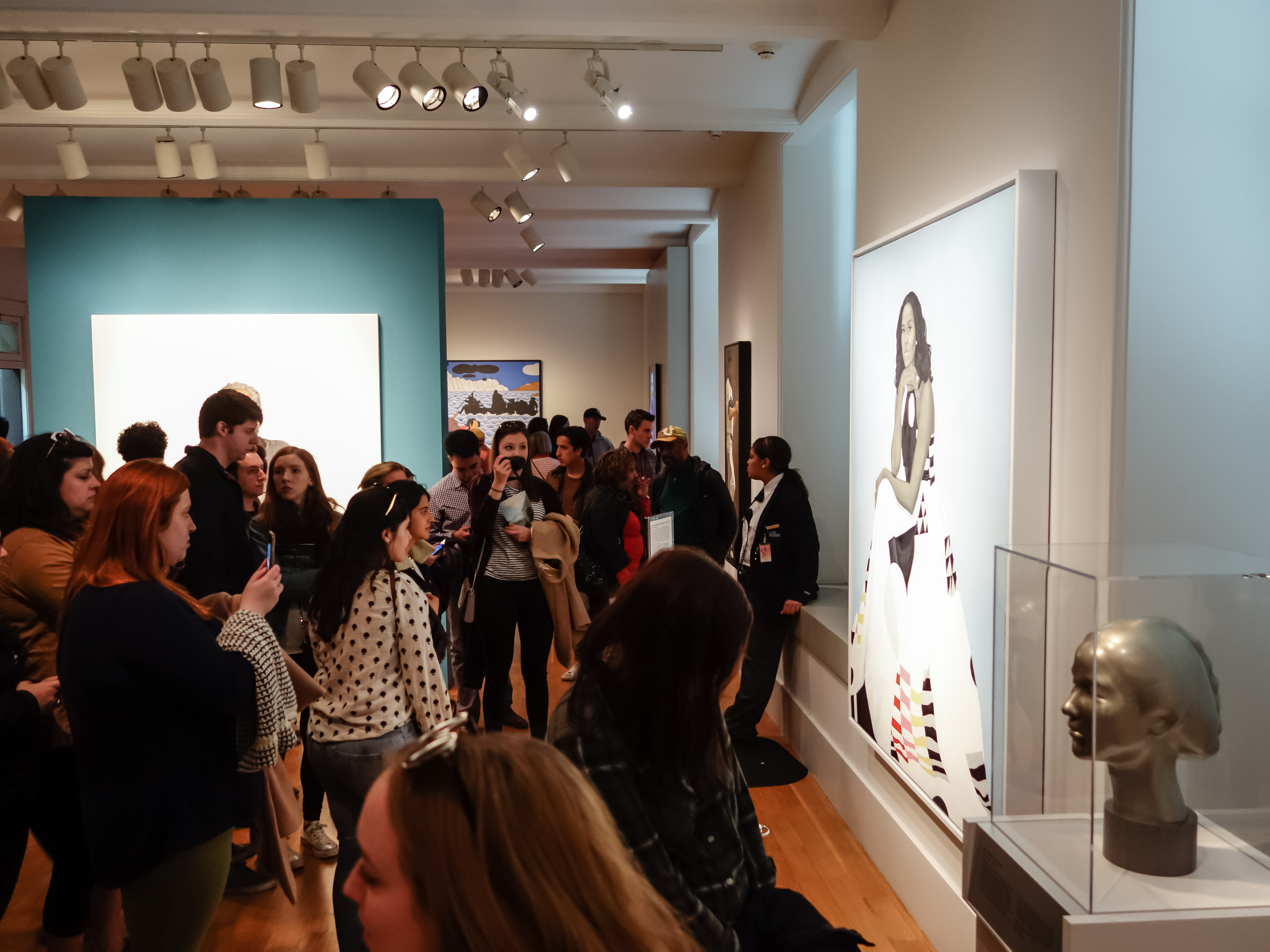
National Portrait Gallery visitors view First Lady Michelle Obama.

Visitors flocked to see the portrait in person. The unveiling led to thousands lined up at the entrance, and a threefold increase in visitors compared to the previous President's Day weekend. As of February 2020, attendance at the National Portrait Gallery had doubled since the unveiling, bringing four million visitors to the museum and turning the queue to see the paintings into its own social experience.

=== Parker Curry photograph ===
Shortly after the painting was put on display, a photograph of a two-year-old African American girl, staring at the painting in awe, went viral on social media, prompting conversation about the value of representation in art. The child pictured was Parker Curry and the photograph taken by Ben Hines of North Carolina, another visitor to the museum that day. Obama later met with Parker and her mother Jessica Curry and the occasion inspired a children's book, Parker Looks Up, written by the Mother-Daughter Curry duo and published by Simon and Schuster. Parker Curry and Jessica's first book "Parker Looks Up" was a New York Times bestseller and was nominated for an NAACP Image Award. Parker and Jessica have since gone on to write and publish eight more children's books including Ready-to-Read and picture books.

=== Later exhibits ===
Beginning on November 13, 2020, and running through May 23, 2021, First Lady Michelle Obama as well as the Michelle Smith dress Obama wore for the sitting are part of an exhibition entitled, "Every Eye Is Upon Me: First Ladies of the United States."

A tour with both Sherald's and Wiley's paintings of the Obamas is planned for 2021. Slated to begin in June, the paintings will be shown for two months each in Chicago, New York, Los Angeles, Atlanta and Houston. The tour planning is emphasizing low-cost tickets so the exhibit will be accessible to as many people as possible; admission to see the paintings in the National Portrait Gallery is free.
