= Emilie Louise Flöge =

Austrian designer and model (1874–1952)

- Flöge, studio of Madame D'Ora-Benda, 1909
- Born: 30 August 1874; Vienna, Austria-Hungary
- Died: 26 May 1952 (aged 77); Vienna, Austria
- Occupation: Couturière
- Partner: Gustav Klimt

Emilie Louise Flöge (30 August 1874 – 26 May 1952) was an Austrian fashion designer and businesswoman. She was the life companion of the painter Gustav Klimt.

== Biography ==
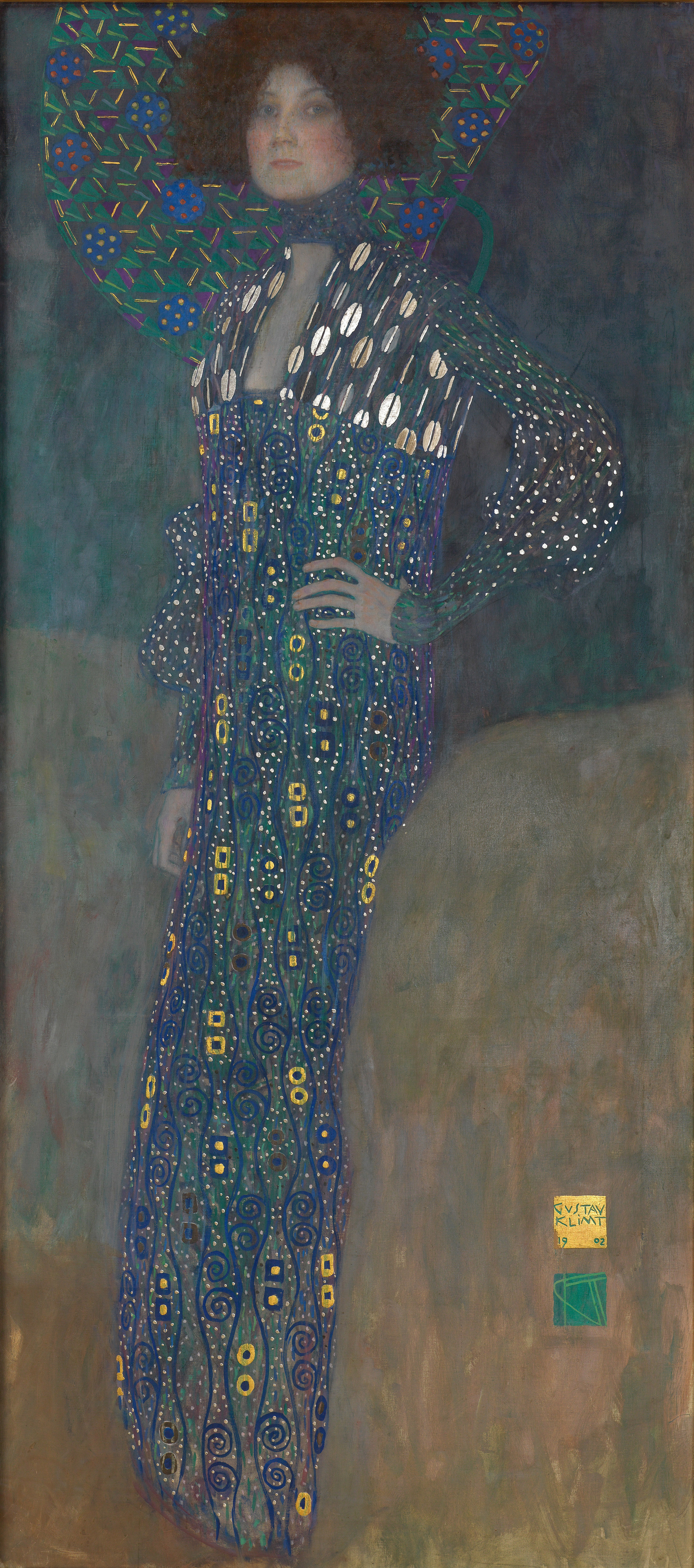
Portrait of Emilie Flöge 1902, oil on canvas, by Gustav Klimt

Flöge was the fourth child of the master turner and manufacturer of Meerschaum pipes, Hermann Flöge (1837–1897). Emilie had two sisters, Pauline and Helene, and a brother, Hermann. Her first job was as a seamstress, but she later became a couturière. In 1894, Pauline, her elder sister, opened a dressmaking school and Emilie worked there. In 1899, the two sisters won a dressmaking competition and were commissioned to make a batiste dress for an exhibition. The same year, Flöge handmade the wedding dress for the mother of Gustav Klimt's heiress Maria Altmann.

In partnership with her sister Helene, after 1904 Flöge established herself as a successful businesswoman and the owner of the haute couture fashion salon Schwestern Flöge (Flöge Sisters) on a major Viennese thoroughfare, the Mariahilfer Strasse. In this salon, which had been designed in the Jugendstil by the architect Josef Hoffmann, she presented designer clothing in the style of the Wiener Werkstätte. Flöge designed bespoke garments, especially loose, patterned dresses in the reform style (a movement also called Victorian dress reform). This style was promoted by the feminist movement in Vienna and was characterized by high bodices, a loose silhouette, and billowing sleeves. It was thought that this type of dress was better for women's health and allowed for a greater range of movement. During her trips to London and Paris she familiarized herself with the latest fashion trends from Coco Chanel and other contemporaries, however, after the Anschluss with the German Third Reich in 1938, Flöge lost her most important customers and had to close her salon, which had become the leading fashion venue for Viennese society. After 1938, she worked from the top floor of her home at 39 Ungargasse.

Emilie Flöge was a member of the Viennese bohemian and fin de siècle circles. She was the life companion of the painter Gustav Klimt. In 1891, Helene, one of Emilie's two older sisters, married Ernst Klimt, the brother of Gustav Klimt. When Ernst died in December 1892, Gustav was made Helene's guardian. At that time, Emilie was eighteen years old, and Gustav became a frequent guest at the home of her parents, spending the summers with the Flöge family at Lake Attersee. Numerous photographs document Klimt with Emilie and her family.

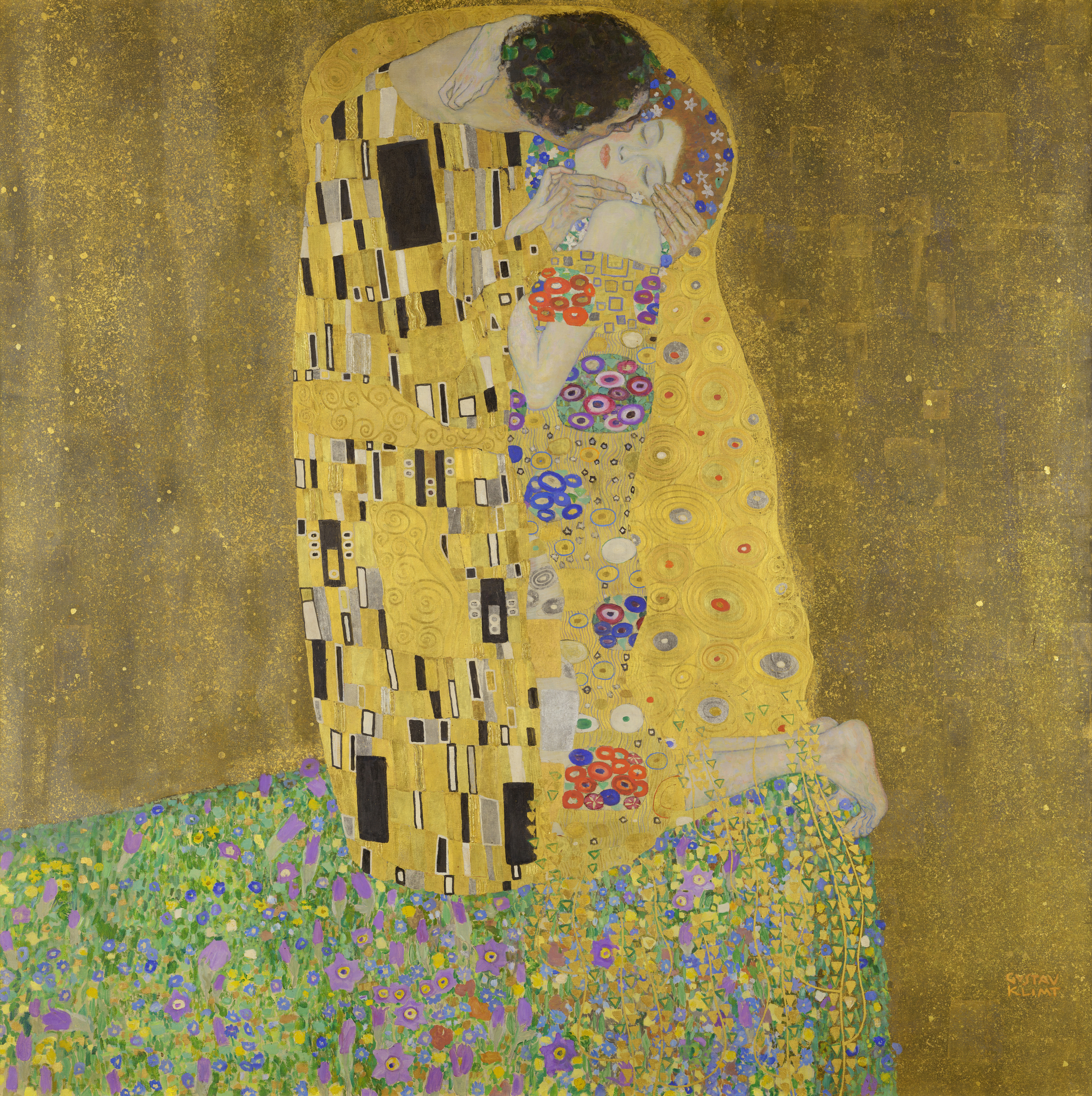
The Kiss 1907–08, oil on canvas, Österreichische Galerie Belvedere, Vienna

After 1891, Klimt portrayed her in many of his works. It is debated if The Kiss (1907–08) depicts Klimt and Flöge as lovers.

Klimt may have drawn some garments for the Flöge salon in the reform dress style, but this is frequently discounted in favor of the idea that the Flöge sisters designed the dresses themselves. The clientele for what was at that time a revolutionary fashion was too small to provide a living, however, and she earned money accordingly through conventional styles. Klimt was painting many women from the upper echelons of Viennese society and thus was able to introduce Emilie Flöge to a prosperous client base. Klimt died from a stroke on 6 February 1918. His last words reportedly were, "Emilie must come." Klimt died without a will so statutory inheritance laws applied. Speculation the Flöge inherited part of the estate has not been attested in the sources.

In the final days of the Second World War, her house in the Ungargasse caught fire, destroying not only her collection of garments, but also valuable objects from the estate of Gustav Klimt.

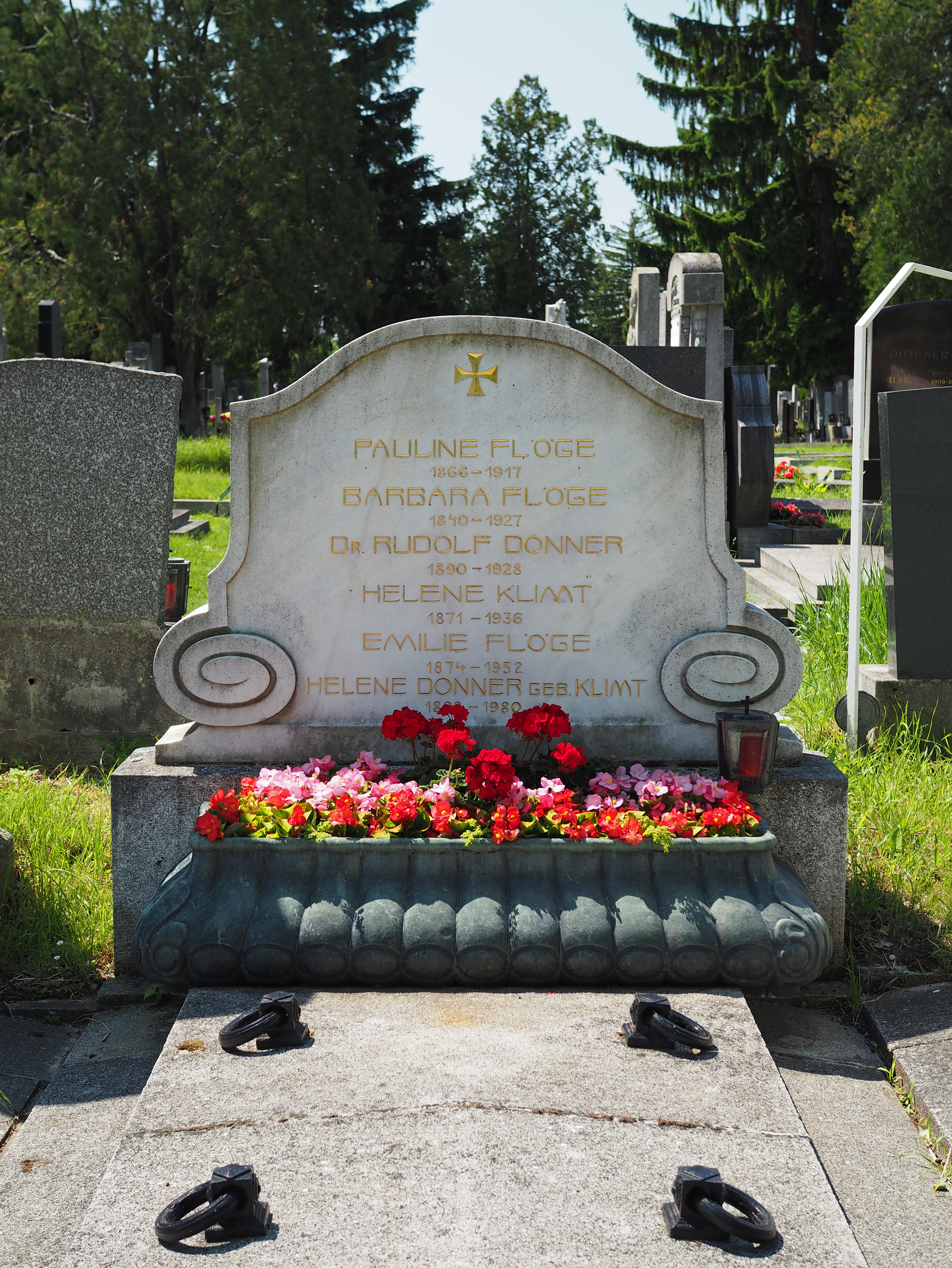
Flöge family grave at the Protestant Cemetery in Simmering

Flöge died at the age of 77 in Vienna on 26 May 1952 and was buried in the Flöge-Donner family grave at the Protestant Cemetery in Simmering on 30 May 1952. The cemetery authorities designated it as a celebrity grave and restored the tombstone for the 150th Anniversary Year of Gustav Klimt. The grave is now included on their website.

== Legacy ==
Flöge's style has been commented to have influenced the portrait First Lady Michelle Obama, by Amy Sherald in 2018.

In 2024, a contemporary sculpture, created and designed by children and the artist Stephan Goldrajch, was inaugurated in Brussels to recall the Flöge's textile work. It is located opposite the Stoclet Palace, whose dining room mosaic friezes were designed by Klimt.

== Images ==
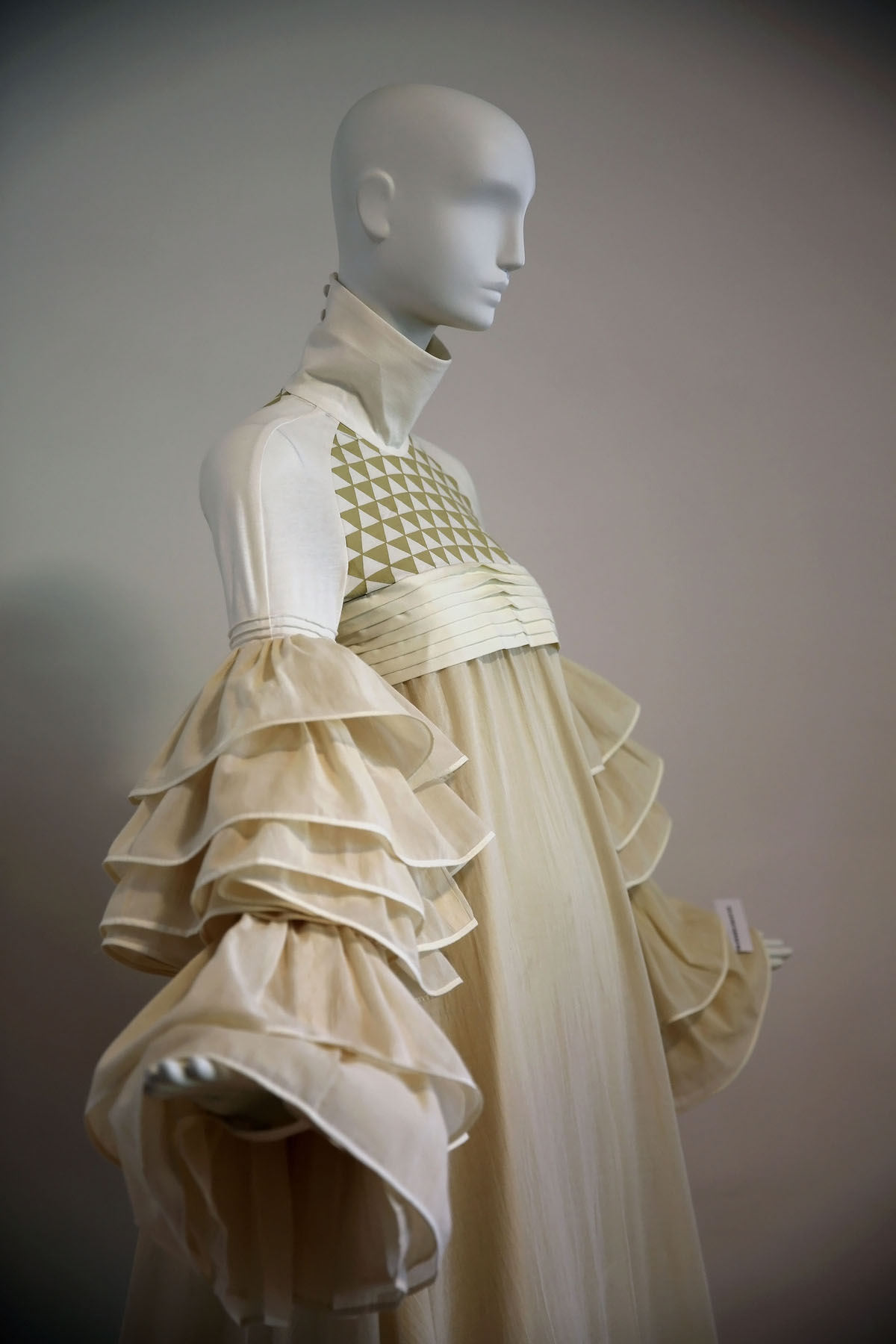
Reconstruction after a dress from the fashion salon Schwestern Flöge (c. 1909)

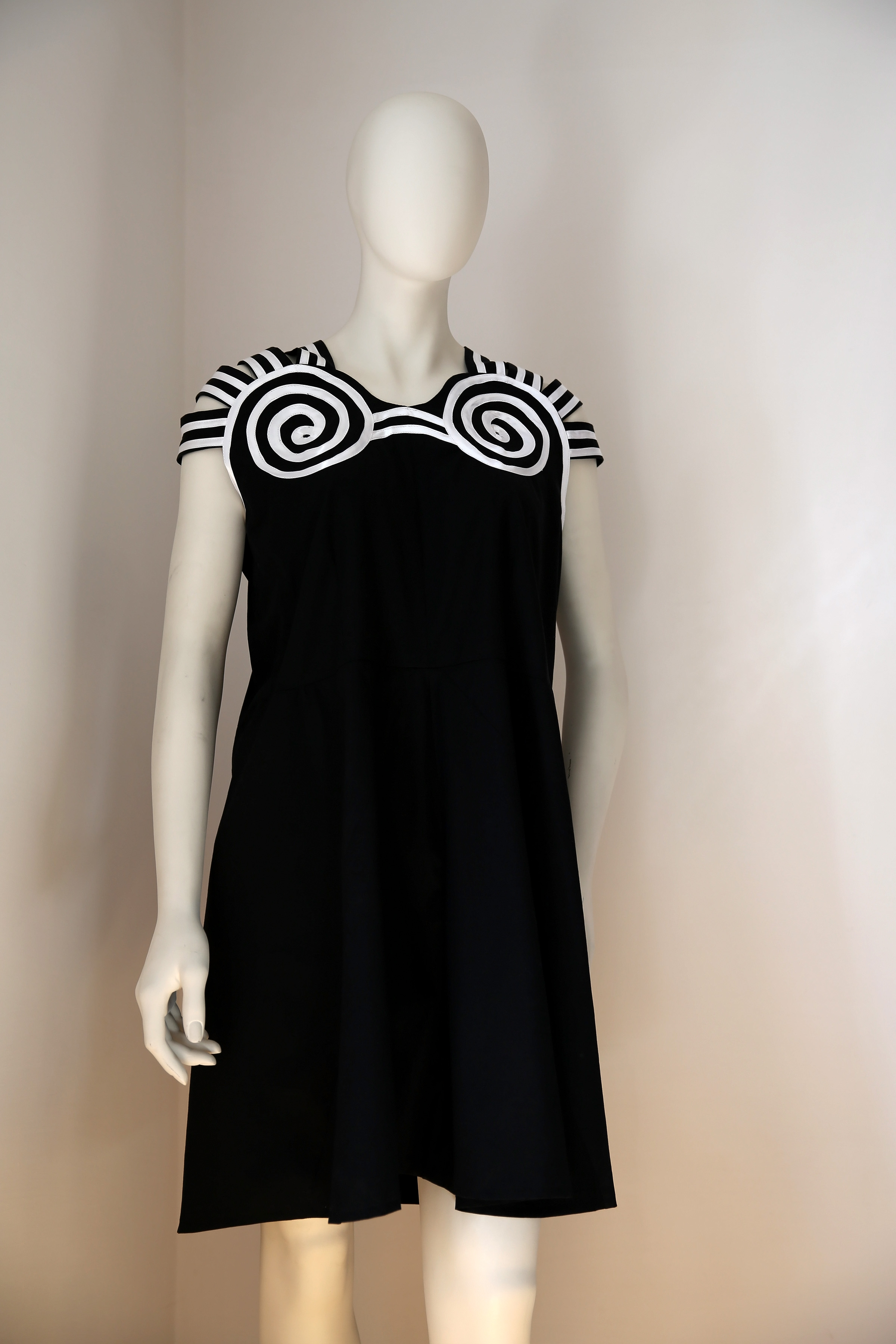
Bathing costume from the estate of Emilie Flöge

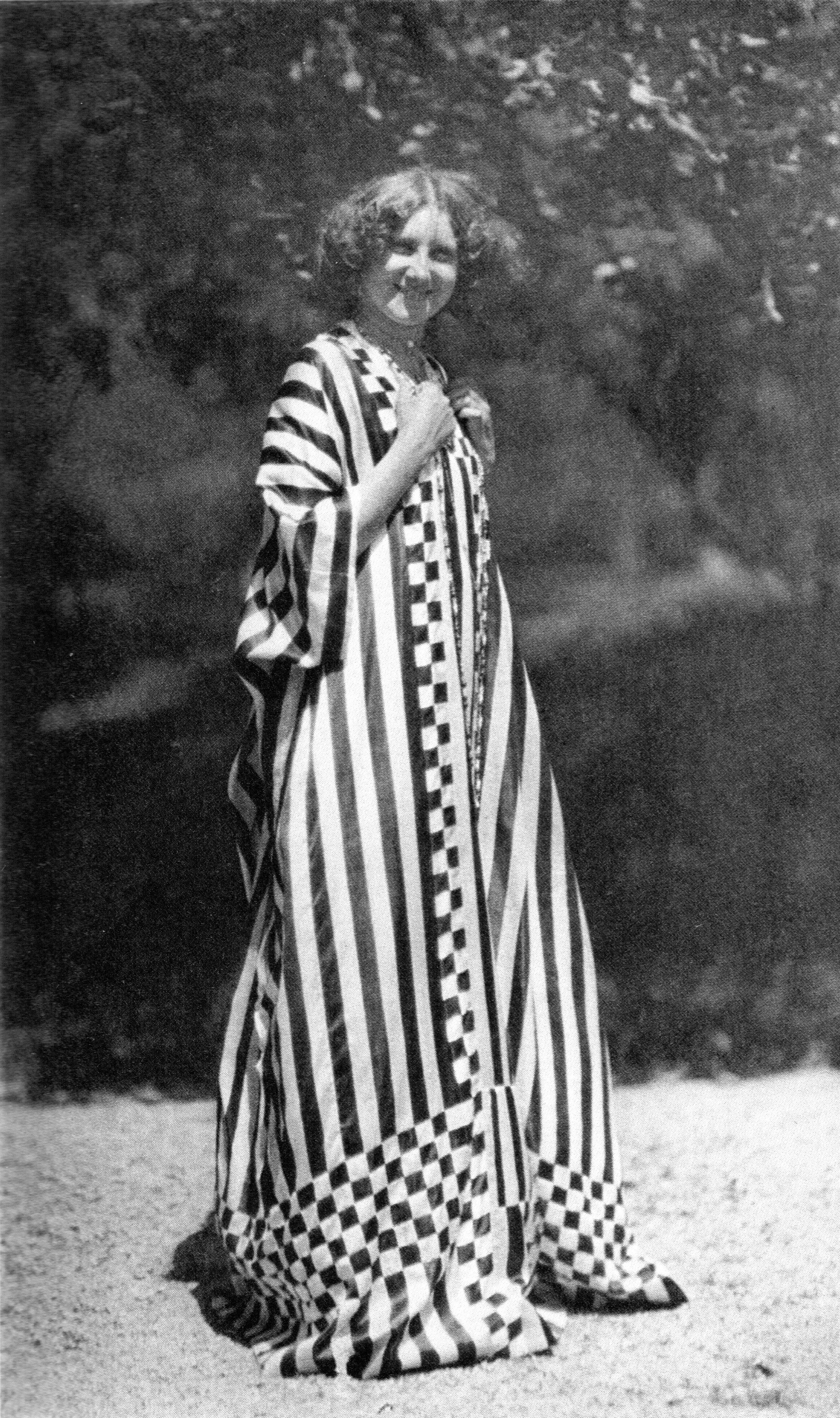
Photogravure of Flöge in Schörfling am Attersee, taken by Heinrich Böhler (1909)

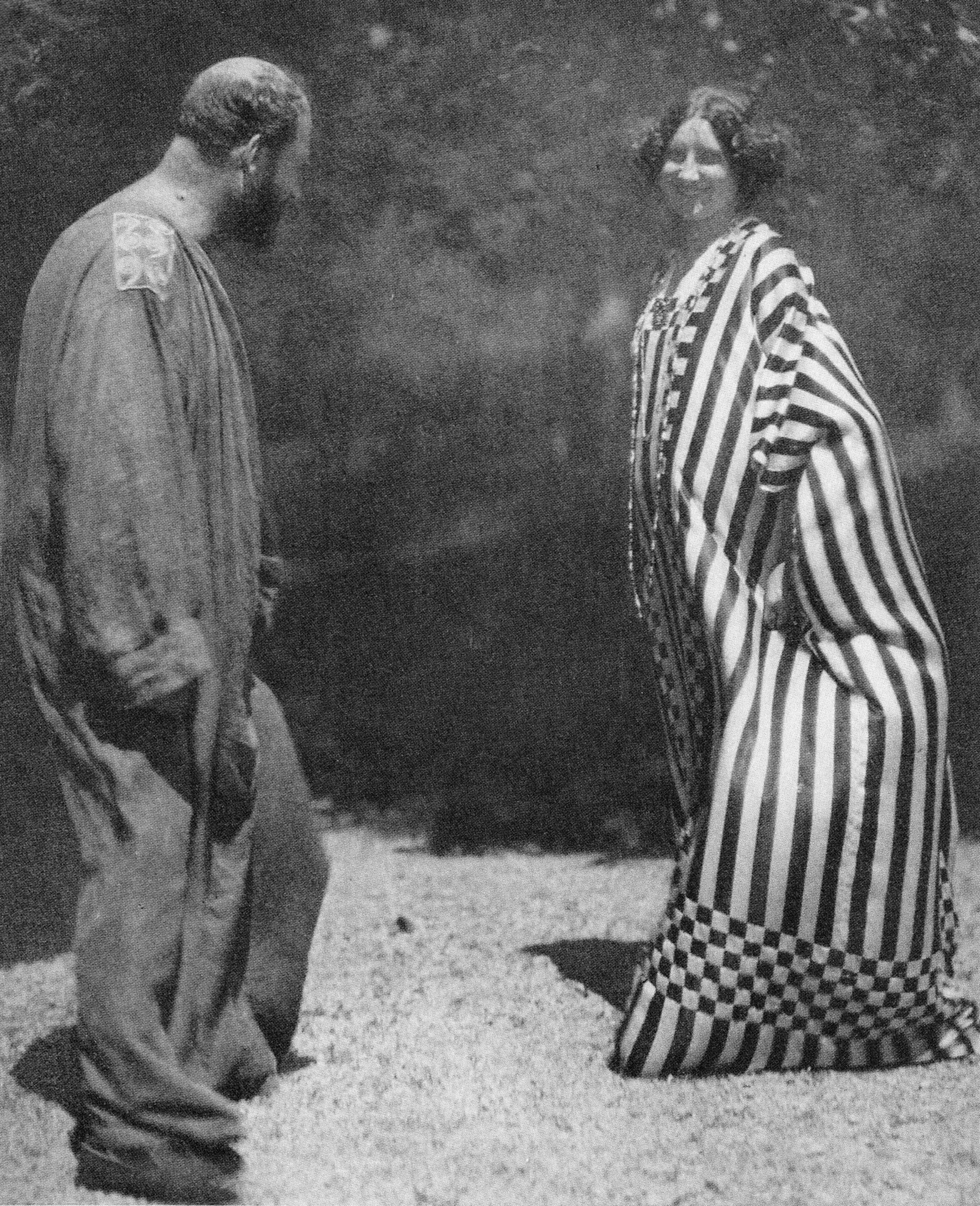
Flöge and Klimt in Schörfling am Attersee, taken by Heinrich Böhler (1909)

== References and sources ==
Sources

- This article began as a translation of the article in the German Wikipedia at de: Emilie Flöge with additional information from the French Wikipedia at fr: Emilie Flöge.
