= Amy Sherald =

American painter (born 1973)

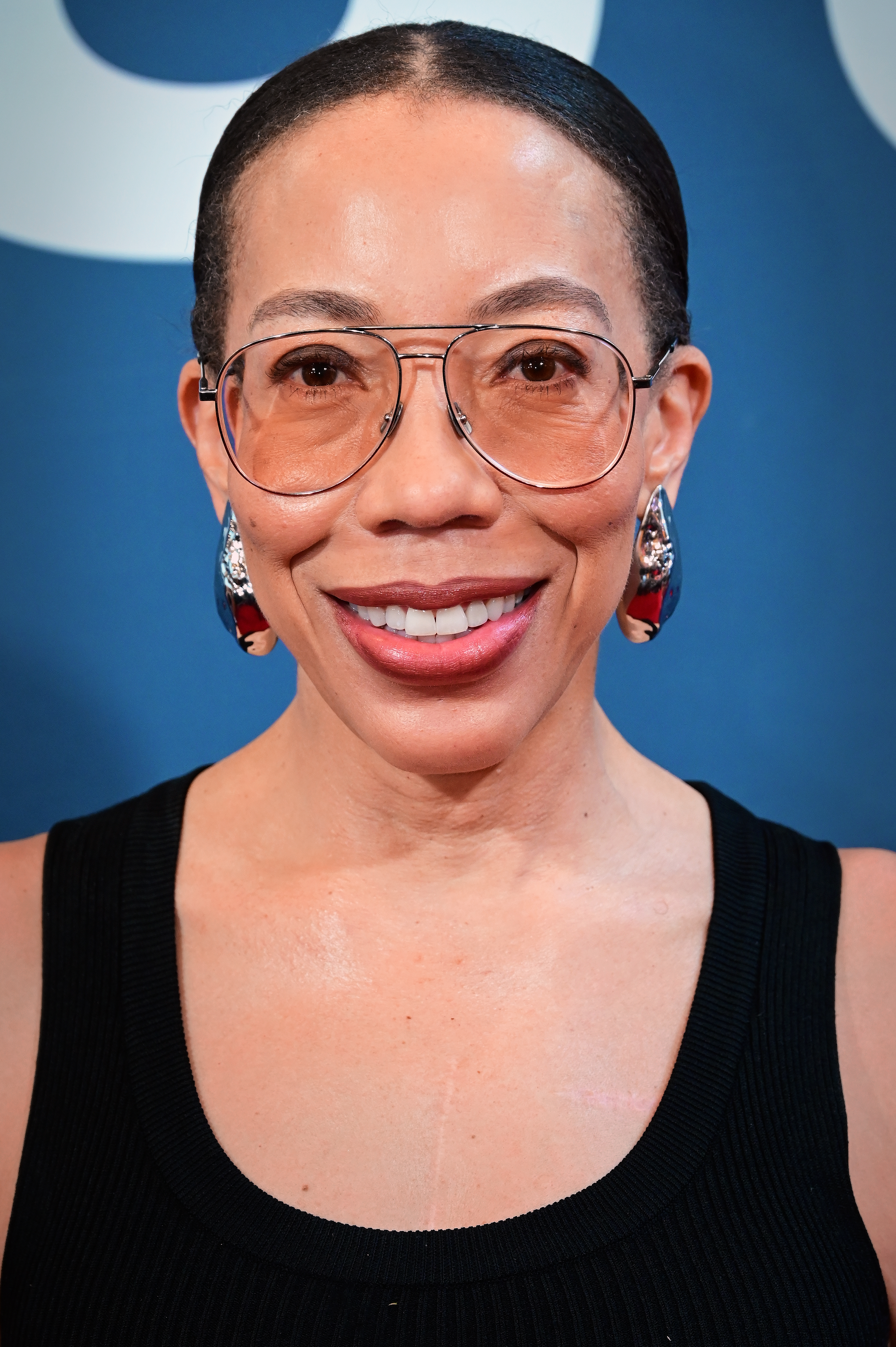
- Sherald in 2026
- Born: August 30, 1973 (age 52); Columbus, Georgia, U.S.
- Education: Clark Atlanta University (BA); Maryland Institute College of Art (MFA)
- Occupation: Painter
- Known for: Official Portrait of First Lady Michelle Obama; The Bathers; Portrait of Breonna Taylor
- Awards: Outwin Boochever Portrait Competition; 2016

Amy Sherald (born August 30, 1973) is an American painter. She works mostly as a portraitist depicting African Americans in everyday settings. Her style is simplified realism, involving staged photographs of her subjects. Since 2012, her work has used grisaille to portray skin tones, a choice she describes as intended to challenge conventions about skin color and race.

In 2016, Sherald became the first woman as well as the first African American ever to win the National Portrait Gallery's Outwin Boochever Portrait Competition with her painting, Miss Everything (Unsuppressed Deliverance). The next year, she and Kehinde Wiley were selected by former President Barack Obama (Wiley) and former First Lady Michelle Obama (Sherald) to paint their official portraits, becoming the first African Americans ever to receive presidential portrait commissions from the National Portrait Gallery. The portraits were unveiled together in 2018 and have significantly increased attendance at the National Portrait Gallery in Washington, D.C.

In December 2020, Sherald's piece The Bathers (2015) was sold at auction for $4.265 million, nearly 30 times the pre-sale estimate. On November 17, 2021, Welfare Queen (2012) sold for $3.9 million in a Phillips New York auction and brought to light the need for more governance around resale royalties for artists.

== Early life ==
Sherald was born on August 30, 1973, in Columbus, Georgia, United States, to dentist Amos P. Sherald III and Geraldine W. Sherald. Her great-grandfather was a German Jewish tailor, and the family belonged to the all-white Worldwide Church of God, celebrating the Sabbath on Friday night, honoring Old Testament holidays such as Passover, and dispensing with Christmas and Easter. As a schoolchild, Sherald had an early interest in art, staying in during recess to draw and often adding images to the ends of sentences, depicting whatever she was writing about—a house, a flower, a bird. Despite this interest, it came as a shock to Sherald, on her first and only school field trip to a museum, to realize that art could be a profession. In particular, the trip to the Columbus Museum allowed her to see Object Permanence, a painting by realistic portrait artist Bo Bartlett that included the image of a black man. Seeing her own world reflected in the halls of the museum world was transforming:

What was so shocking when I first went to a museum, was to find out that art wasn't something in a book, in an encyclopedia, that people did [art] a long time ago, that it was real life. And then, when I saw an image of a person of color, it all came together in that moment—that this was something real, that somebody created this who was alive at the same time that I was alive.

Not withstanding this revelatory experience, Sherald's parents wanted her career to be in medicine, and discouraged her from pursuing art. Sherald has said her mother's opposition increased her determination: "She was a black woman born in 1930s Alabama where everything was really about surviving. I always say that she was the perfect mother for me, because what I needed was somebody to prove wrong. I'm a strong woman because I was raised by one, and I'm a better person for that."

Sherald's upbringing also influenced the specific themes of interest to her in her painting career. Attending school in a predominantly white area of the South, she was often one of few African-American students in her class. Her position was further complicated by her light-colored hair and skin. The experience made Sherald conscious of race from an early age, as well as the related social cues, again informed by her mother: "'You're different from everybody else [...] You need to speak a certain way and act a certain way.' That's what my mom told me on the first day of school." Especially looking back on her upbringing from her postgraduate vantage point, Sherald felt black life in the South was often reduced to a singular narrative and sought to make paintings that created new, alternative narratives about African American life.

== Education ==
Sherald is a graduate of St. Anne-Pacelli Catholic School in Columbus. She enrolled at Clark Atlanta University, where she began college on the pre-med track her parents hoped for, but as a sophomore cross-registered for a painting class at Spelman College, which introduced her to Panama-born artist and art historian Arturo Lindsay, whose work focuses on the African influence on the cultures of the Americas. Sherald graduated with a B.A. degree in painting in 1997 from Clark Atlanta University. After an apprenticeship with Lindsay, painting for free for five years. Sherald attended the Maryland Institute College of Art (MICA) in Baltimore, receiving an M.F.A. degree in painting in 2004. While attending MICA, Sherald studied with abstract expressionist painter Grace Hartigan, from whom she learned the "dripping method" of painting. Sherald also convinced Odd Nerdrum to mentor her in Norway. In 2021, Sherald received an Honorary Doctorate of Fine Arts from MICA.

== Career ==
=== Early career ===
Spending much of her career based in Baltimore, Sherald documents contemporary African-American experience in the United States through large-scale portraits, often working from photographs of strangers she encounters on the streets. This approach is evocative of the late Barkley L. Hendricks.

Sherald has been described as being highly motivated to become an artist, having wanted to be a painter so badly that she waited tables until she was 38.

In 1997, Sherald participated in Spelman College International Artist-in-Residence program in Portobelo, Panama. She prepared and curated shows in the Museo de Arte Contemporaneo and the 1999 South American Biennale in Lima, Peru. She has taught art in the Baltimore City Detention Center, and in 2008 she did a residency the Tongxian Art Center in Beijing, China.

Since 2008, Sherald has painted a little over 30 pieces of art. Since her 2012 work Equilibrium, Sherald has depicted the skin tone of her Black subjects in grayscale rather than flesh tones. She uses the gray hues to challenge an idea of race where skin color automatically assigns a category, part of a broader project to counter what she experienced as the limited narrative available to her growing up in segregated Columbus, Georgia, only shortly after the Civil Rights Movement. The choice as well as her process echoed and was reinforced by 19th- and 20th-century black-and-white photographic portraits, especially W. E. B. Du Bois's black and white photographs of black people in the 1900 Paris Exposition, which at the time sharply contrasted with other exhibitions' sensationalized displays of black bodies. Sherald said in a round table:

"When I finally came across the black-and-white photography, I realized that I was setting these people up and recreating that same kind of quietness and dignity that I saw in these photographs that Black families were having taken of them. I just recognized my work inside of these photographs and started to go further.".

Critics have commented on the way this style invites the viewer to contemplate the inner lives of Sherald's subjects. For Sherald, this kind of work only feels possible because of a preceding generation of artists who made what she calls more "didactic" work, explaining Blackness to an audience that sometimes had little awareness. With that work already done by others, Sherald feels she and her contemporaries are free to "come in and really explore ourselves versus educating people about who we are. It's like now we can deal with the nuances of who we are", making paintings that focus on inner, complex lives and "escape that public black identity".

Sherald usually develops these paintings by inviting people she meets in her everyday life—for much of her career, in Baltimore—to sit for a photography session and then paints from the photographs.

Miss Everything (Unsuppressed Deliverance), 2016

=== Outwin Boochever prize ===
Sherald came to prominence in 2016 when her painting Miss Everything (Unsuppressed Deliverance) won the National Portrait Gallery's Outwin Boochever Portrait Competition along with a $25,000 award. The competition noted that "Sherald creates innovative, dynamic portraits that, through color and form, confront the psychological effects of stereotypical imagery on African-American subjects". She was the first woman and first African American to win the competition. Sherald's Miss Everything was selected among 2,500 other entries.

As with other paintings, Sherald shot a long photography session to capture the image she wanted to paint from—only after an hour did the sitter relax into the pictured pose. Sherald said the painting was inspired by Alice in Wonderland, noting the dress and the teacup, and said her work often "starts in a place of fantasy", here lending itself to the possibility of "being seen as more than the color of your skin".

=== First Lady portrait ===
The year after Sherald won the Outwin Boochever Portrait Competition, she was chosen by First Lady Michelle Obama to paint her official portrait for the National Portrait Gallery. Obama recounted an immediate connection upon meeting Sherald, feeling "blown away by the boldness of her colors and the uniqueness of her subject matter" as well as Sherald's personal presence: "Within the first few minutes of our conversation, I knew she was the one for me."

Sherald's creative process began as soon as she learned she had received the commission, looking up every image of Michelle Obama she could find on the internet. The Obama portrait was a departure for Sherald, who had never taken a directed commission before, but in other respects her approach remained the same. She sought to avoid creating a painting that was similar to Obama's "public entity", and instead develop one that was more "private and intimate". Sherald set up photography sessions in D.C. and went through many dresses with Obama's stylist Meredith Koop, the final selection being a relatively casual, sleeveless maxi dress from Michelle Smith's Spring 2017 collection for American fashion line Milly. For Sherald, the dress connected to the black history of quilting, like those of Gee's Bend. Elements of the portrait have been noted by art critics to have been influenced by Gustav Klimt, in particular the Portrait of Adele Bloch-Bauer I. One commentator noted the similarity to fashion designed by Klimt's muse Emilie Louise Flöge.

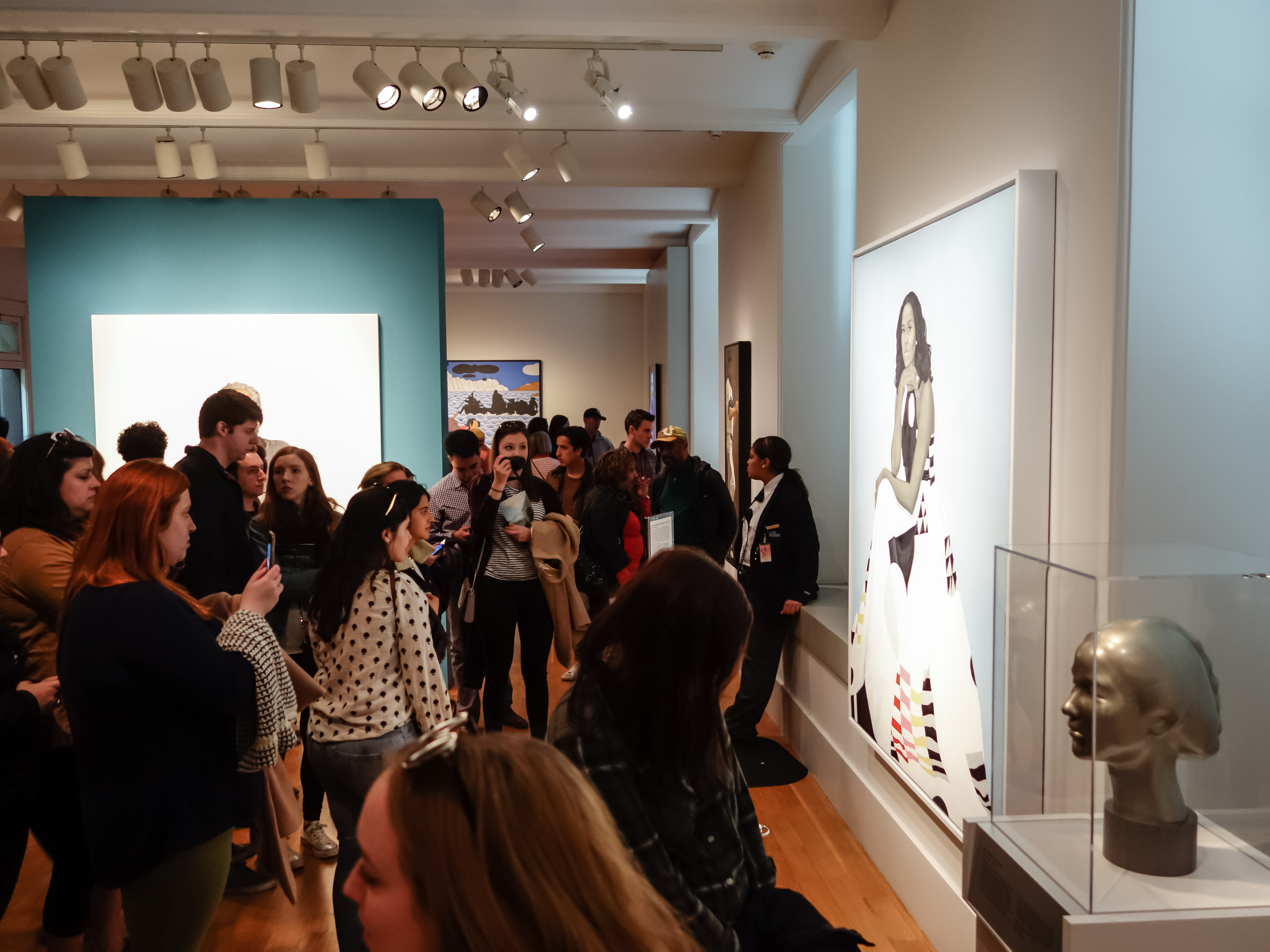
National Portrait Gallery visitors view First Lady Michelle Obama.

Unveiled in 2018, Sherald's portrait and Kehinde Wiley's painting of Barack Obama made them the first African-American artists to make official presidential portraits at the National Portrait Gallery; notably, they both were also artists who early on prioritized African-American portraiture. Holland Cotter noted in a review that they also both blend fact and fiction in their portraiture. The portraits drew high numbers of visitors to the National Portrait Gallery.

There was some criticism of the painting, including that it was less formal than many had expected or "Why is she gray? ...It doesn't look like her." Sherald summarized her response: "Some people like their poetry to rhyme. Some people don't." Sherald used her signature grayscale to depict Obama's skin, feeling photo-realism was a "dead end" and wanting to encourage the viewer to see Obama in her entirety as a person rather than solely as her racial identity. Writing about the painting, critic Doreen St. Félix said "lack of brown skin may at first feel like a loss, but soon becomes a real gain". The choice prompts the viewer to see her in the way "women can relate to—no matter what shape, size, race, or color. . . ." The portrait reflects the shared sense that people could relate to the former First Lady, in its simplicity, while also referring to the way others looked up to her.

Asked about the pressure of this painting, Sherald said she was initially anxious because of the emotion invested in the Obama family globally, but realized there were millions of people she might not be able to please. Ultimately, she felt satisfied that Michelle Obama loved it.

=== Subsequent work ===
Since the Boochever prize and the Obama commission, Sherald has received considerable public acclaim. In 2018, she had her first museum solo exhibition at the Contemporary Art Museum St. Louis and received a mural commission in Philadelphia. The same year, a mural version of her work Equilibrium was installed on the wall of the Parkway Theatre located in Baltimore. The project was funded through the 2014 Transformative Art Prize grant, an initiative that installs public artworks in underused public places in Baltimore. The original painting is in the permanent collection of the Embassy of the United States, Dakar, Senegal.

Until that point based in Baltimore, in 2018 Sherald moved to New Jersey and began working from a studio in Jersey City at Mana Contemporary, a former tobacco factory converted into artist spaces.

Sherald was awarded the High Museum of Art's David C. Driskell Prize in 2018.

Sherald's solo exhibition titled the heart of the matter... took place in fall 2019 at the Hauser & Wirth gallery in New York City. The exhibition featured eight large-scale oil portraits. Writing about the show, Erin Christovale, an associate curator at the Hammer Museum, wrote: "There's something about the grayness that doesn't mute the paintings but allows you to really think about the various skin tones and cultures and spaces that the African diaspora exists in." Sherald's gallery, Hauser, described this effect produced by the grayscale as "requir[ing the viewer] to meet the artist's subjects actively and to 'negotiate' their own conceived notions of Black American life."

Sherald also has a 2020 exhibition of five small-scale portraits of black women created over the duration of the COVID-19 pandemic. With her characteristic use of grisaille and newer form of gouache, Sherald creates confident and calm black women in Womanist is to Feminist as Purple is to Lavender, an Alice Walker quote. These show black women focusing on different forms of leisure activities. One painting has a woman lying back in a vibrant orange chair; another has a barefoot woman sitting on her bicycle in a yellow polka-dot dress. Sherald approaches the same everyday activities seen in her previous work, but now focuses on a more relaxed mood. Sherald, who described her art classes as "a safe haven" growing up, told Creative Boom: "I always want the work to be a resting place, one where you can let your guard down among figures you understand."

Sherald's first major West Coast solo show opened in March 2021. The solo debuts a collection of new paintings in an exhibition titled The Great American Fact, which "consists of five works produced in 2020 that encompass Sherald's technical innovations and distinctive visual language to center Black Americans in scenes of leisure surrounded by stillness."

=== Breonna Taylor portrait ===
In 2020, Sherald painted Breonna Taylor's portrait on the September cover of Vanity Fair. After the 26-year-old medical worker was shot and killed by Louisville police officers in her apartment in March, Taylor's case received nationwide attention and fueled demonstrations throughout the world, along with the murders of Ahmaud Arbery and George Floyd. Sherald created this image of Taylor with her signature gray-scale skin coloring, along with a free-flowing blue dress against an aqua background. Sherald told Vanity Fair: "[Taylor] sees you seeing her. The hand on the hip is not passive, her gaze is not passive. She looks strong! I wanted this image to stand as a piece of inspiration to keep fighting for justice for her. When I look at the dress, it kind of reminds me of Lady Justice.

The painting was jointly acquired by the Smithsonian National Museum of African American History and Culture in Washington, D.C., and the Speed Art Museum in Louisville, Kentucky. It was featured in the Speed Art Museum's exhibit Promise, Witness, Remembrance honoring the life of Breonna Taylor in 2021.

From the sale of the portrait, Sherald gave $1 million to the University of Louisville in 2022 to establish two grant programs in Breonna Taylor's name.

=== Trans Forming Liberty ===
In 2024, Sherald painted a depiction of the Statue of Liberty modeled after black transgender artist Arewa Basit, entitled Trans Forming Liberty.

In July 2025, Sherald withdrew her solo show American Sublime from the Smithsonian National Portrait Gallery after the gallery discussed removing the portrait from the show in response to internal concerns about provoking President Donald Trump. The gallery had proposed replacing the portrait with a video display of people reacting to the painting and discussing transgender issues, but according to Sherald the video had included anti-trans rhetoric, and so she rejected it.

The New Yorker magazine used Trans Forming Liberty as its cover of the August 11, 2025, issue. This was the second time Sherald's work had been used on a New Yorker cover; her first cover was Miss Everything (Unsuppressed Deliverance) in the March 24, 2025, issue.

On September 3, 2025, it was announced that American Sublime would be exhibited at the Baltimore Museum of Art (2 November–5 April 2026). Sherald was awarded its Artist Who Inspires Award at the BMA Ball 2025 on November 22, 2025. In February 2026, American Sublime set a new attendance record at the museum.

At the High Museum of Art's David Driskell Prize gala on September 20, 2025, director Rand Suffolk announced that American Sublime would be exhibited at the High 15 May–27 September 2026.

== Art market ==
On December 7, 2020, Sherald's piece The Bathers (2015) sold for $4,265,000 at the Phillips' Evening Sale of 20th Century & Contemporary Art. This exceeded the pre-sale estimate ($150,000–200,000) nearly 30 times over.

== Personal life ==
Sherald's father died of Parkinson's disease in 2000, and her aunt developed a brain infection around the same time. Later, Sherald's brother died from lung cancer.

Sherald was diagnosed at the age of 30 with congestive heart failure when she went for a normal checkup during her triathlon training. Sherald's doctor informed her that her heart function was at 5%; she then stayed two months in the hospital waiting for a new heart. She was the recipient of a heart transplant on December 18, 2012, at the age of 39. Before her transplant, Sherald's artistic career was also put on pause when she had to care for an ill family member.

After 13 years with Baltimore as her home base, in 2018 Sherald moved to New Jersey.

=== Political activism ===
Ahead of the 2024 United States presidential election, Sherald was one of 165 leading contemporary artists who contributed pieces to Artists for Kamala, an online sale with all proceeds raised going directly to the presidential campaign of Kamala Harris.

The show Amy Sherald: American Sublime was due to be exhibited at the National Portrait Gallery from 19 September 2025 to 22 February 2026; on July 24, 2025, Sherald announced that the show would not travel there "... after representatives of the museum allegedly suggested removing a portrait of a non-binary transgender person posing as the Statue of Liberty to avoid falling afoul of US president Donald Trump's crusade against trans identity."

== Exhibitions ==
- 2011: The Magical Realism of Amy Sherald, University of North Carolina at Chapel Hill, Sonja Haynes Stone Center, Chapel Hill, North Carolina
- 2013: Reginald F. Lewis Museum of Maryland African American History & Culture, Baltimore, Maryland
- 2016: The Outwin 2016: American Portraiture Today, National Portrait Gallery, Washington, D.C.
- 2017: Fictions, Studio Museum in Harlem, New York, NY
- 2018: Amy Sherald, Contemporary Art Museum Saint Louis, Saint Louis, Missouri
- 2018: Amy Sherald, Crystal Bridges Museum of American Art, Bentonville, Arkansas
- 2019: Amy Sherald, Spelman College Museum of Fine Art, Atlanta, Georgia
- 2019: Amy Sherald: the heart of the matter..., Hauser & Wirth, New York, NY
- 2020: Womanist is to Feminist as Purple is to Lavender, Hauser & Wirth, NY
- 2021: Promise, Witness, Remembrance, Speed Art Museum, Louisville, Kentucky
- 2022: Women Painting Women, Modern Art Museum of Fort Worth
- 2024: Amy Sherald: American Sublime (retrospective), San Francisco Museum of Modern Art, 16 November 2024–9 March 2025; Whitney Museum of Art, 9 April–10 August 2025. The show was due to travel to the National Portrait Gallery but was canceled by Sherald. The Baltimore Museum of Art, 2 November–5 April 2026 (added 3 September 2025). The High Museum of Art, 15 May–27 September 2026 (added 20 September 2025).

== Public collections ==
- Baltimore Museum of Art, Baltimore, MD
- Cleveland Museum of Art, Cleveland, OH
- Crystal Bridges Museum of American Art, Bentonville, Arkansas
- The Columbus Museum, Columbus, Georgia
- Embassy of the United States, Dakar, Senegal
- FTI Technologies Inc., Baltimore, Maryland
- Kemper Museum of Contemporary Art, Kansas City, Missouri
- Nasher Museum of Art, Durham, North Carolina
- National Gallery of Art, Washington, D.C.
- National Museum of African American History and Culture, Smithsonian Institution, Washington, D.C.
- The National Museum of Women in the Arts, Washington, D.C.
- National Portrait Gallery, Smithsonian Institution, Washington, D.C.
- Whitney Museum of Art, New York, NY

== Awards ==
Sherald, along with Wangechi Mutu, received the Baltimore Museum of Art's Artist Who Inspires Award at their BMA Ball & After Party on November 22, 2025.

On February 26, 2026, Time Magazine named Sherald one of its 2026 Women of the Year.
