= Michelle Smith (fashion designer) =

American fashion designer

- Born: 1972 or 1973 (age 52–53)
- Education: Fashion Institute of Technology; ESMOD
- Known for: Contemporary womenswear
- Notable work: Milly; Dress worn in First Lady Michelle Obama
- Spouse: Andrew Oshrin (m. 2003; div. 2019)
- Website: michellesmith.nyc

Michelle Smith (born 1972 or 1973) is an American fashion designer. From 2000 to 2019, she was the designer at Milly, a contemporary womenswear line she cofounded. In 2020, she launched a new direct-to-consumer brand called Michelle Smith, for which she will design two collections annually.

Smith designed the gown First Lady Michelle Obama selected to wear in her official portrait for the National Portrait Gallery by Amy Sherald.

== Early life ==
Born in 1972 or 1973, Michelle Smith grew up in Connecticut, New Jersey and Ohio, the daughter of a factory plant manager father and stay-at-home mother. Raised in Mount Holly, New Jersey, Smith attended Rancocas Valley Regional High School, graduating in 1990. Since childhood, she had wanted to be a fashion designer and took summer art classes at the Moore College of Art and Design. After high school, she enrolled at the Fashion Institute of Technology (FIT).

== Career ==
=== Early career ===
While at FIT, Smith had a retail job at an Hermès boutique and, writing a letter to the president of the brand, managed to secure an internship with the company in Paris where she was the first American employee. She next interned at Louis Vuitton, also in Paris, and then enrolled at the French fashion school ESMOD. While there, she had another internship with the haute couture studio of Christian Dior where her job was to illustrate gowns in watercolor: one copy for the client, one for the archives.

Smith returned to New York in 1996, starting in an entry level position with an outwear company called Gallery. Interviewing for that position, she met Andrew Oshrin, then a manager of production at Gallery, who later became the cofounder of Smith's own brand. In 1998 Smith moved to contemporary brand Helen Wang. Designing there spurred her interest in developing her own line, buoyed by how well her designs for Helen Wang sold.

=== Milly ===
In 2000, Smith and then-boyfriend Andrew Oshrin launched a fashion line called Milly. Working from an initial $50,000 investment by Oshrin, the pair set a goal of doing $1.2 million in gross revenue in their first year of sales. Smith's colorful, patterned designs were an immediate success and Milly met the sales goal in three months; the line became profitable within a year. The brand opened its first store in 2011.

Writing in Vogue in 2012, Brittany Adams called Milly "the brand that built itself on ladylike designs with an edge." Discussing the line in 2018, fashion critic Robin Givhan characterized Milly as "not a rarefied brand. While it's designer driven, it's rooted in American sportswear and with cocktail dresses priced at $850 or so, it falls into the fashion category of affordable luxury: aspirational, but not impossible."

At its peak, Milly grossed about $50 million annually.

Detail from First Lady Michelle Obama showing the colors, pattern and texture on the skirt of the dress Smith designed as interpreted by Sherald

A design from Smith's Spring 2017 collection for Milly was selected as the dress First Lady Michelle Obama would wear in her official portrait for the National Portrait Gallery by Amy Sherald. Smith had worked with Obama and her stylist Meredith Koop previously, including for an Essence cover shoot, and pulled the dress from production when Koop expressed interest, so that the design could remain unique to Obama. They worked remotely, with Smith tailoring the dress to Obama's measurements; she learned her dress, one of two final contenders, was likely the one Obama would wear for the sitting, but the final wardrobe decision wasn't revealed until the portrait's unveiling ceremony. Smith said she felt the dress was appropriate to the portrait because its style was representative of the way Obama dressed in her daily life; additionally, Smith considered the material and design symbolic of Obama's contemporary sensibilities in her life overall: "It's made of a stretch cotton poplin print in a clean, minimal, geometric print without a reference to anything past or nostalgic, which gives the dress a very forward-thinking sensibility—this is very Michelle Obama." The portrait's painter Amy Sherald, by contrast, found inspiration in the historical echoes she saw in the dress's color and pattern, feeling it recalled paintings by Piet Mondrian as well as the historic Gee's Bend quilts from the small, remote community in Alabama descended from formerly enslaved African Americans.

Obama was also pictured wearing a striped Milly top on January 17, 2017, her last birthday in the White House, taking a final walk through the building in the Administration's last days.

In 2019, Smith and Oshrin sold Milly to apparel company S. Rothschild & Co.

=== After Milly ===
In 2020, Smith launched a direct-to-consumer fashion brand called Michelle Smith. The new line is more casual than Milly—a response, Smith said, to the new emphasis on comfort during the COVID-19 pandemic when there was little use for office or special occasion wear—but uses upscale materials and details. She plans to design two collections annually.

== Personal life ==
Smith's partner is celebrity SoulCycle instructor and author Stacey Griffith. Smith was previously married to Andrew Oshrin, with whom she built Milly. Married in 2003, they had two children together before separating in 2017 and divorcing in 2019.
