= Milly (fashion brand) =

American fashion designer

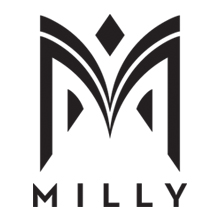
- Industry: Fashion design, retail
- Founded: New York City, United States
- Area served: Worldwide
- Products: Clothing, accessories
- Owner: S. Rothschild
- Website: www.milly.com

Milly (stylized as MILLY) is an American fashion company. Specializing in women’s clothing, it was founded in 2000 by fashion designer Michelle Smith and Andrew Oshrin. The company is based in New York City and retails worldwide in department stores, via its own boutiques, its website and wholesales primarily to department stores. Smith and Oshrin ran the company until 2019 when it sold to S. Rothschild.

The brand is known for its bold, colorful and feminine designs that blend vintage and contemporary styles. Milly's designs are worn by many celebrities and fashion influencers.

== History ==
Milly designer Michelle Smith had an early interest in fashion, taking summer classes at Moore College of Art and Design growing up, then enrolling at New York’s Fashion Institute of Technology after high school. While a student, she had internships at the Paris ateliers of Hermès, Louis Vuitton and Christian Dior Haute Couture, and enrolled at the French fashion school ESMOD.

After returning to New York, Smith established Milly in 2000 with her business partner and then-boyfriend (later husband), Andrew Oshrin. Supported by a $50,000 investment from Oshrin, the two wholly owned the company. which began as a wholesale business with the goal of doing $1.2 million in gross revenue in the first year. Smith’s colorful, patterned designs were an immediate success and Milly met the sales goal in three months;. the line became profitable in the first year.

By 2005 the line grossed $11 million annually. In 2011, Milly opened its first retail boutique on Madison Avenue in New York City.

Retailers include Bergdorf Goodman, Neiman Marcus, Saks Fifth Avenue, Bloomingdale's, and Harrods. The brand’s flagship store is located on Madison Avenue in New York City, and there are boutique stores in Dubai, Kuwait and Doha.

The two operated the business until 2019, when they sold Milly to apparel company S. Rothschild at auction for $5.7 million.

== Customers ==
The brand has been worn by Beyoncé, Gwyneth Paltrow and Kate Middleton, and was selected by Michelle Obama to design the dress she wore in the First Lady Michelle Obama portrait for the National Portrait Gallery.

== Style ==
Milly collections merge American sportswear influences with Parisian atelier techniques, incorporating custom-made fabrics and prints. The collection’s range includes ready-to-wear, accessories, swimwear and childrenswear.

In 2006, the New York Observer wrote that Milly was “a favorite among stylish New York women in their 20s and 30s who might be venturing beyond the safety of J.Crew and Banana Republic, but aren’t yet ready to fork up for the Marc Jacobs and Prada. A Milly silk pleated skirt with yellow, brown and teal roses from the fall line retails for $260, while a black-and-white strapless cocktail dress costs $345.”
