= Michele Smith (music executive) =

American music executive

- Occupations: Music executive, producer
- Employer: Craft Recordings (Concord)
- Television: Stax: Soulsville U.S.A.
- Awards: Grammy Award for Best Historical Album (2024)

Michele Smith is an American music executive. She serves as the vice president of estate and legacy brand management at Craft Recordings, the catalog label division of Concord, where she manages the Stax Records brand alongside the estates of Billie Holiday and Tammy Wynette.

== Career ==
Prior to her tenure at Concord, Smith held various marketing and executive positions at Virgin Records, MCA, Hidden Beach, and Perspective Records.

In 2024, she served as an executive producer for the HBO documentary series Stax: Soulsville U.S.A. Outside of her corporate work, she teaches within the entertainment industry management graduate program at Carnegie Mellon University.

At the 66th Annual Grammy Awards in 2024, Smith won the Grammy Award for Best Historical Album in her capacity as a compilation producer for Written in Their Soul: The Stax Songwriter Demos. The project comprised a seven-disc audio box set showcasing previously unreleased demo tracks from the Stax catalog. She shared the award win with co-producers Cheryl Pawelski and Mason Williams, alongside mastering engineer Michael Graves.
