= Kehinde Wiley =

American portrait painter (born 1977)

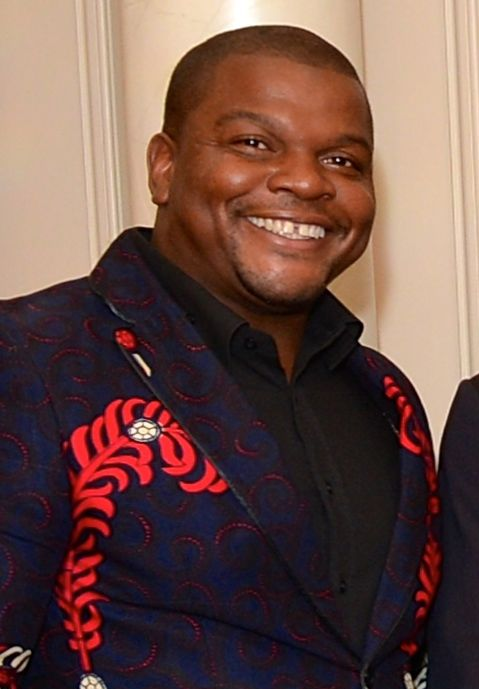
- Wiley in 2015
- Born: February 28, 1977 (age 49); Los Angeles, California, US
- Education: San Francisco Art Institute; Yale University
- Known for: Painting, sculpting
- Notable work: President Barack Obama

Kehinde Wiley (born February 28, 1977) is an American portrait painter based in New York City. He is known for his naturalistic paintings of Black subjects that reference the work of Old Master paintings. In 2017, Wiley was commissioned to paint former U.S. President Barack Obama's portrait for the National Portrait Gallery of the Smithsonian Institution. The Columbus Museum of Art hosted an exhibition of his work in 2007 and describes his paintings as "heroic portraits which address the image and status of young African-American men in contemporary culture."

Wiley was included in Time magazine's "100 Most Influential People of 2018".

== Early life and education ==
Wiley was born in Los Angeles, California, in 1977. His father, Isaiah D. Obot, is Ibibio, from Nigeria, and his mother, Freddie Mae Wiley, is African American. Wiley has a twin brother.

As a child, Wiley's mother enrolled him and his siblings in art classes after school with the intention of keeping them engaged in constructive activities. At the age of 11, Wiley and his brother were selected, along with 48 other children, to study briefly at an art conservatory near Leningrad, USSR (now St. Petersburg, Russia.) There, Wiley developed a strong interest in portraiture. Wiley has said that his brother was better at portraiture than he was, which fueled a sense of friendly competition between them. The siblings would compete to see who could recreate the most realistic images. After returning to the United States, Wiley continued studying art and attended the Los Angeles County High School for the Arts.

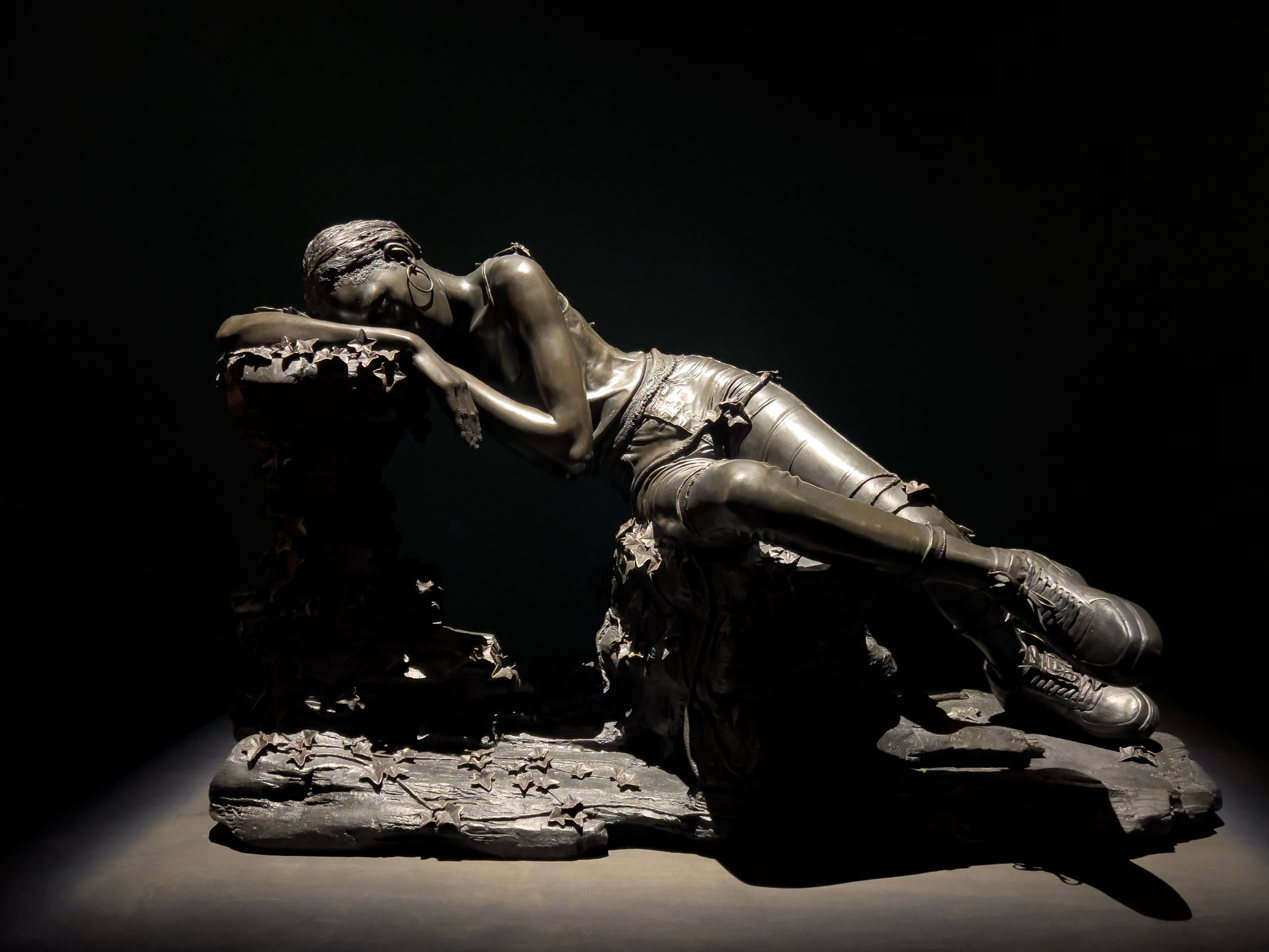
Kehinde Wiley sculpture

Wiley's father, Isaiah, was a Nigerian student who came to the US on scholarship. He returned to Nigeria upon finishing his studies,^{[12]} leaving Wiley's mother, Freddie, to raise the couple's six children on her own.^{[13]} Wiley has said that his family survived on welfare checks and the limited income earned by his mother's "thrift store"—a patch of sidewalk outside their home.^{[14]} At age 20, Wiley traveled to Nigeria to meet his father and explore his family roots.^{[15]}

In 1999, Wiley earned a BFA degree from the San Francisco Art Institute. He received a scholarship to attend the Yale University School of Art, and completed an MFA in 2001. Wiley has said his most important lesson in art school was to focus on making the work he wanted to make, rather than the work he thought professors wanted him to make.^{[1]}

Wiley received an honorary DFA from Yale University in 2024.

== Career ==
=== Residency and inspiration ===
Kehinde Wiley is a portrait painter whose monumental works use bold color and engage themes of race and representation. He has been described as among contemporary artists seeking to address racial power dynamics through art. After receiving the commission to paint former United States President Barack Obama, Wiley gained wider attention, exhibiting in multiple international shows and exhibiting in such places as Cuba, Nigeria, and Los Angeles.

The beginnings of Wiley's portraits can be traced back to his time in Harlem during a residency at the Studio Museum. During that period, he found a crumpled NYPD mugshot of an African-American man in his 20s with basic personal identifying information. Wiley kept the image, which would later inspire future works including Conspicuous Fraud Series #1 (Eminence) and a recreation in Mugshot Study (2006, Plate 8).

Reflecting on the mugshot's influence, Wiley has said the discovery altered his view of what portraiture could be and sharpened his thinking about the portrayal of Black men. To address what he saw as gaps in that portrayal, he drew on his background in classical painting, combining modern source material with historic portrait traditions.

Wiley's Rumors of War is a bronze sculpture that commemorates African-American youth affected by social and political conflicts across the United States.

=== The World Stage ===
Though Wiley's early portraits were based on photographs of young men from the streets of Harlem, he later expanded his sources and references internationally, drawing from urban centers including Mumbai, Senegal, Dakar, and Rio de Janeiro. This resulting body of work became known as The World Stage. Models wore everyday clothing and assumed poses drawn from artwork in their location's history. It has been described as a juxtaposition of "the 'old' inherited by the 'new', who often have no visual inheritance of which to speak."

Wiley has said he selects countries he sees as on the "conversation block" in the 21st century to be represented in The World Stage. These have included Brazil, Nigeria, India, and China, which he has called "points of anxiety and curiosity and production" for the world. He has increasingly referenced historic artistic styles from the subjects' own countries rather than relying solely on Western traditions.

=== Barack Obama presidential portrait ===
In October 2017, it was announced that Wiley had been chosen by Barack Obama to paint an official portrait of the former president to appear in the Smithsonian National Portrait Gallery "America's Presidents" exhibition. Amy Sherald was simultaneously chosen by Michelle Obama for the First Lady portrait. They were the first Black artists to paint the official portraits of a U.S. president and First Lady.

From initial discussions to unveiling on February 12, 2018, the project spanned more than two years. While many presidential portraits depict their subjects in formal office settings, Wiley portrayed Obama seated on an antique chair, seemingly floating amid foliage. Each plant references a location from Obama's life: chrysanthemums, the official flower of the city of Chicago (where he was elected as senator); African lilies, representing Kenya to show respect to Obama's father, who died when he was a young adult; and jasmine, representing Obama's childhood in Hawaii with his grandparents.

Wiley has said Obama's pose in the portrait was inspired by a candid moment during the reference photo session that felt authentic to Obama. During the unveiling, Wiley stated that Obama wanted "a very relaxed, man-of-the-people representation," achieved through small details such as an open collar, the absence of a tie, and the perception that the President's body was physically moving towards the viewer instead of appearing aloof. Wiley also explained that the composition stages a visual tension between Obama and the foreground foliage, intended to suggest a life larger than any single narrative.

Obama has said that Wiley's work elevates ordinary people to look regal and places them within American visual life, reflecting Obama's belief that politics should be about the country unfolding from the bottom up and not the other way around.

After the unveiling of Wiley's portrait of the president and Amy Sherald's portrait of the First Lady, the Smithsonian National museum saw an increase in the number of visitors from 1.1 to 2.1 million people.

Some conservative commentators criticized Wiley's selection for the commission by noting earlier paintings in which he depicted Black women holding the severed heads of White women in versions of Judith Beheading Holofernes.

=== Rumors of War series and statue ===
Wiley's initial series of works titled Rumors of War (2005) and reimagined equestrian portraiture with contemporary male subjects wearing items such as sports jerseys and Timberland boots, while retaining the original titles.

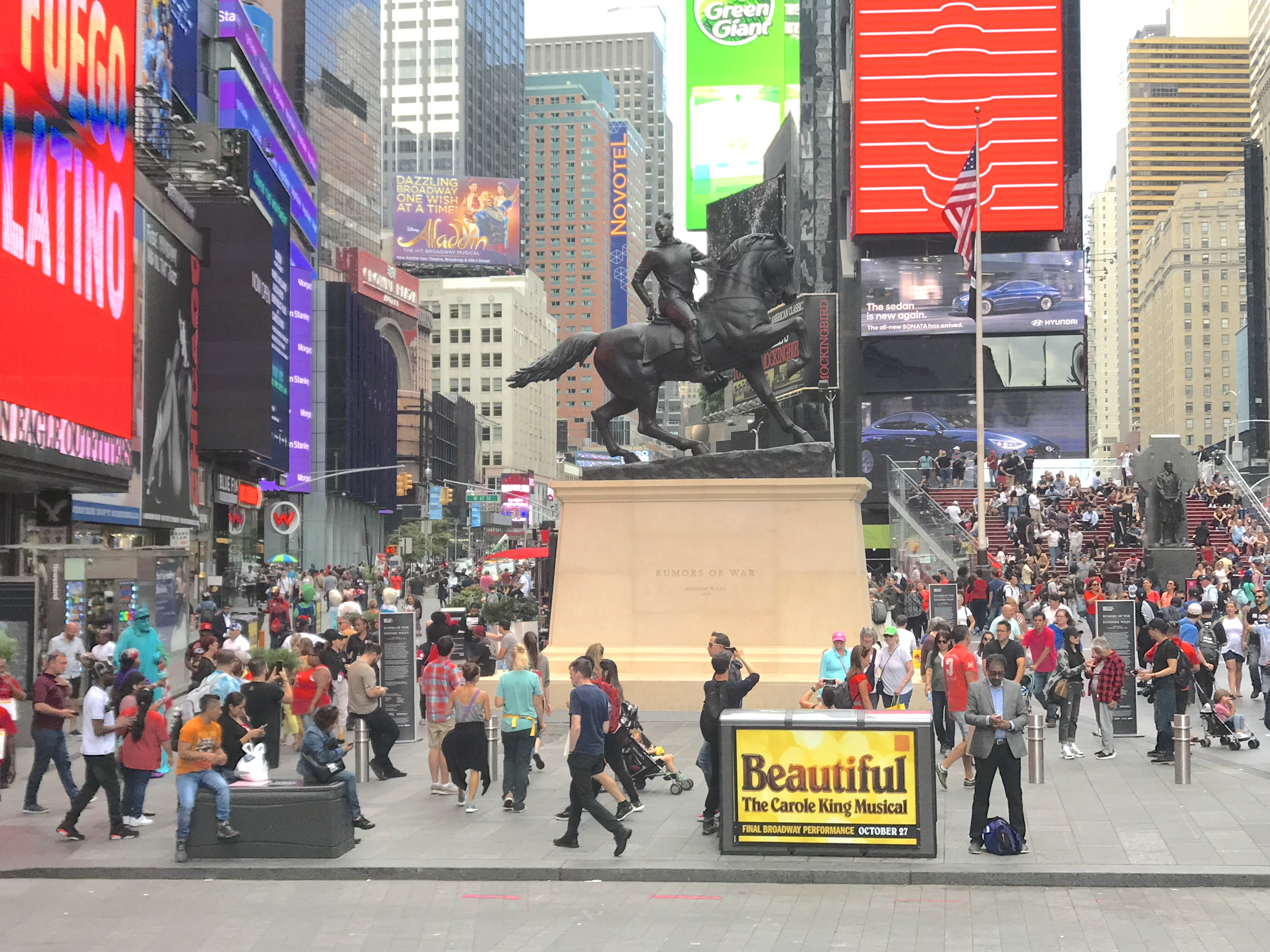
Wiley's sculpture Rumors of War in Times Square, 2019

After visiting Richmond, Virginia, Wiley revisited the idea in response to Confederate monuments on Monument Avenue and the idea of the Lost Cause of the Confederacy existing within a modern "hipster" town. Wiley created Rumors of War, a 30-foot-tall statue of a young Black man in jeans, Nike high-tops and dreadlocks, modeled on the J. E. B. Stuart monument. The work was unveiled in Times Square before being moved to the Virginia Museum of Fine Arts, roughly a mile away from the J. E. B. Stuart statue which inspired it and the institute that commissioned it. At 27 feet high and 16 feet wide, it was his largest work to date as of 2019. The project was delivered in collaboration with Times Square Arts, Sean Kelly Gallery and UAP.

=== Other work ===
Wiley had a retrospective in 2016 at the Seattle Art Museum. In May 2017, he had an exhibit, Trickster at the Sean Kelly Gallery, New York City, featuring 11 paintings of contemporary black artists.

Wiley opened a studio in Beijing, China, in 2006, initially to reduce costs by employing assistants for some brushwork; by 2012, he said lower costs were no longer the reason. Some critics have questioned the extent to which Wiley's paintings are painted by Wiley himself; when asked about visiting his Beijing studio to watch him paint, he declined. The studio is managed by Ain Cocke, who has worked for Wiley for nearly a decade, first as a painting assistant and now as a manager. He is an accomplished painter, though far less successful commercially.

In 2021, Wiley's Go became a permanent installation in the concourse of New York City's Penn Station. The stained-glass work depicts Black breakdancers against a sky with clouds. The piece is inspired by the 18th-century ceiling frescoes of Giovanni Battista Tiepolo. The work is his first permanent, site-specific installation in the medium of glass. He also curated a group show of African arts featuring Nigerian artist Oluwole Omofemi at the Jeffrey Deitch Gallery in Los Angeles.

=== Imagery, symbolism, and themes ===
==== Reimagining the Old Masters with Black protagonists ====
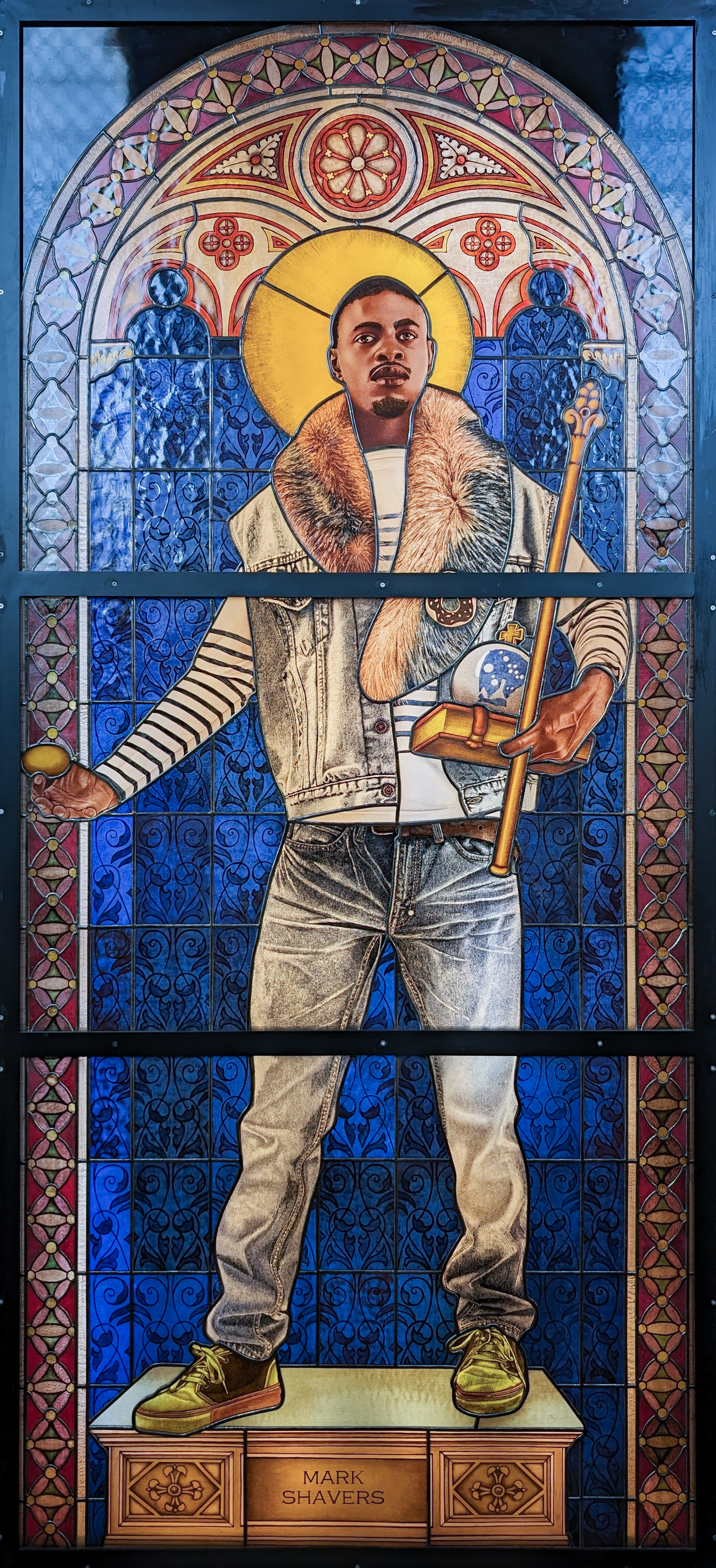
Saint Adelaide (2014) is a stained-glass window designed by Wiley. It was inspired by an 1843 window of Saint Adelaide designed by Jean-Auguste-Dominique Ingres for the Chapel of Saint Ferdinand, Paris.

Wiley often references Old Master paintings for the pose of a figure. Rendering figures realistically while citing specific Old Master works, Wiley fuses period styles and influences ranging from French Rococo, Islamic architecture, and West African textile design to urban hip-hop and the "sea foam green" of a Martha Stewart Interiors color swatch. He depicts his larger-than-life figures in a heroic manner, giving them poses that connote power and spiritual awakening in their portrayal of masculinity.

In a number of his paintings, Wiley inserts Black protagonists into Old Master paintings. In 2007, he reimagined Théodore Géricault's early-19th-century The Charging Chasseur with a young black man in casual streetwear as the sword-wielding hussar in Officer of the Hussars.

Similarly, Napoleon Leading the Army over the Alps (2005) is based on Napoleon Crossing the Alps (1800) by Jacques-Louis David. Wiley restaged it with an African rider wearing modern army fatigues and a bandanna. Wiley "investigates the perception of blackness and creates a contemporary hybrid Olympus in which tradition is invested with a new street credibility." While creating the work, Wiley attempted to use live horses and found the proportions between rider and horse in the original to be unrealistic. The purpose of art during David's time was to serve as propaganda. Although seemingly naturalistic, both Wiley's and David's portraits feature riders who are disproportionate to their steed, because "men look a lot smaller on real horses." Wiley has said he is drawn to, and also seeks to expose, the illusionism of Old Master painting: "The appeal, I suppose, is that, in a world so unmasterable and so unknowable, you give the illusion or veneer of the rational, of order—these strong men, these powerful purveyors of truth. And so this thing that I do is in a strange sense being drawn toward that flame and wanting to blow it out at once."

Wiley's portraits are based on men he encounters, including on Harlem's 125th Street and in South Central Los Angeles neighborhood where he was born. Wearing everyday clothing, models are asked to assume poses from paintings by Renaissance masters, such as Titian and Giovanni Battista Tiepolo. Wiley describes his approach as "interrogating the notion of the master painter, at once critical and complicit." His figurative paintings "quote historical sources and position young black men within that field of power."

His art has been described as having homoerotic qualities. Wiley has used a sperm motif as symbolic of masculinity and gender.

Wiley sometimes changes the gender of figures portrayed in earlier works. In Portrait of a Couple (2012), he replaces a 1610 heterosexual couple with two young men. The same year, he exhibited two variations on the Judith Beheading Holofernes Biblical story famously painted by Caravaggio, replacing the male Holofernes with female figures. New York magazine described one of these as depicting "a tall, elegant black woman in a long blue dress. In one hand, she holds a knife. In the other, a cleanly severed brunette female head." Wiley said about this work: "It's sort of a play on the 'kill whitey' thing". A second painting entitled Judith Beheading Holofernes also features a modern-day black woman as Judith and a white woman as Holofernes, challenging the viewer's expectations of this familiar motif, inviting political readings, and "bending a violent image from art history—which is rife with them [...]—to the needs of a country that is reexamining the violent underpinnings of even its most benign-seeming traditions." Art critic Walter Robinson remarks that this reimagining of the Judith/Holofernes story "suggests, with a jovial brutality, that Judith would prefer to be done with white standards of beauty."

==== Masculinity and femininity ====
Much of Wiley's work focuses on male figures, a choice he has linked to the relative absence of women in historical portraiture. The way he positions and paints his figures has been described as inverting conventional masculine and feminine social norms. He emphasizes features in ways traditionally applied to women, includes motifs such as sperm that reference vitality, and sometimes places figures in vulnerable poses. The floral and decorative backgrounds further complicate the idea of masculinity. Patterns of lace and flowers are often associated with femininity, and, by submerging his male figures in these ornate backgrounds, Wiley acknowledges the beauty and youth of his subjects.

==== Power ====
Wiley has stated that his ornate portraits were intended to reimage depictions of Black men in art. Poses adapted from classical paintings are used to comment on historical power dynamics between African-American men and white men. In these reworks on 18th-century compositions featuring modern Black subjects, the subjects assume positions of status and regard. Wiley’s paintings have been described as presenting figures as worthy of attention, rather than as background or subordinate elements, and as offering alternatives to certain media portrayals. Some figures appear in poses that do not align with contemporary expectations of Black masculinity.

==== Background imagery ====
Wiley's portraits are known for their bright, intricate backgrounds that are purposefully different from the portraits they are based on. Where original backdropsof the classical portraits Wiley uses for his references are full of sweeping estates, their families, and other possessions, Wiley instead introduces detailed backgrounds full of bright patterns that at times extend into the foreground. His intent is to create a background that, just like his figures, is competing to be noticed, and to blend the two in order to elevate them both.

Wiley draws inspiration for these designs from historical work from the Rococo and Neoclassical art periods as well as elaborate wallpapers. The original portraits that Wiley recreates would have hung in lavish homes of the wealthy amongst other extremely detailed ornaments to further enhance the wealth of the homeowners. By replicating these patterns and motifs from opulent decor and other elements of interior design and encapsulating his figures within them, Wiley is recreating a similar sense of wealth with his portraits. Viewers are led to re-contextualize their view of the urban figures as they associate them with the lavish backdrops.

== Recognition and honors ==
In October 2011, Wiley received the Artist of the Year Award from the New York City Art Teachers Association/United Federation of Teachers. He also received Canteen magazine's Artist of the Year Award. Two of Wiley's paintings were featured on the tops of 500 New York City taxi cabs in early 2011 as a collaboration with the Art Production Fund.

Wiley was featured in a commercial on the USA Network as a 2010 Character Honoree.

Puma AG commissioned Wiley to paint four portraits of prominent African soccer players; patterns from the paintings were incorporated into Puma athletic gear. The complete series, Legends of Unity: World Cup 2010, was exhibited in early 2010 at Deitch Projects in New York City.

His work was exhibited in the National Portrait Gallery as part of the Recognize exhibit in 2008. Kehinde Wiley: A New Republic, was a retrospective at the Virginia Museum of Fine Arts, in the summer of 2016. It displayed nearly 60 of his paintings and sculptures.

== Sexual assault allegations ==
In May 2024, Wiley was accused of sexual assault by artist Joseph Awuah-Darko, who said that Wiley had assaulted him twice in June 2021 during and after a dinner event in Ghana. Awuah-Darko said he was first "inappropriately groped" shortly after meeting Wiley, and that a "much more severe and violent" assault occurred later that day. Awuah-Darko said that he did not initially recognize the incident as assault and did not report it due to attitudes toward LGBT rights in Ghana. Awuah-Darko also used his Instagram to share testimonials from others who said their experiences corroborated his allegations.

Wiley denied the accusations, stating that the two had been in a "brief, consensual relationship". Lawyers for Wiley sent Awuah-Darko a cease and desist letter demanding the removal of his "categorically false and defamatory" Instagram posts. Wiley's representatives also shared a series of text messages between the two men, which they said were sent in the months after the alleged assault, in which Awuah-Darko asked to meet Wiley again.

Following Awuah-Darko's posts, three more individuals accused Wiley of sexual violence: activist Derrick Ingram, artist Nathaniel Lloyd Richards, and photographer Terrell Armistead. Ingram said that Wiley raped and sexually assaulted him in September 2021 during what he described as a brief relationship. Richards said that Wiley had groped him on a date in 2019. Armistead accused Wiley of groping him and "performing forced oral penetration" during a 2010 encounter at Wiley's apartment. The four accusers said they planned to file a class action lawsuit against him.

In response, Wiley said that the allegations were "completely false" and a "social media-driven fabrication" that distracted from his traveling exhibition An Archaeology of Silence. He also said he had never met Armistead and disputed elements of Armistead's story.

Several art museums said they would suspend or cancel planned exhibitions of Wiley's work, including the Minneapolis Institute of Art, the Pérez Art Museum Miami, and the Joslyn Art Museum. The National Coalition Against Censorship called the allegations against Wiley "serious and concerning" but criticized the museums' decisions, arguing for contextualizing problematic artists rather than canceling them.

== Personal life ==
Wiley has identified as a gay man. He has said that his sexuality "is not black and white. I am a gay man who has drifted. I am not bi. I've had perfectly pleasant romances with women, but they weren't sustainable. My passion wasn't there. I would always be looking at guys."

Between 2014 and 2018, Wiley created Black Rock Senegal in Yoff, an artist residence designed by Senegalese architect Abib Djenne.

== Solo exhibitions ==
- 2002: Kehinde Wiley at Real Art Ways, Hartford, CT
- 2002: Passing/Posing at the Rhona Hoffman Gallery, Chicago, IL
- 2003: Pictures at an Exhibition at Roberts & Tilton, Los Angeles, CA
- 2003: Faux/Real at Deitch Projects, New York, NY
- 2004: Easter Realness at Rhona Hoffman Gallery, Chicago, IL
- 2004: Passing/Posing The Paintings of Kehinde Wiley at The Brooklyn Museum of Art, Brooklyn, NY, catalogue
- 2005: Bound - Kehinde Wiley Paintings at Franklin Art Works, Minneapolis, MN
- 2005: White at the Conner Contemporary, Washington, D.C.
- 2005: Rumors of War at Deitch Projects, New York, NY
- 2006: Kehinde Wiley: Columbus at the Columbus Museum of Art, Columbus, OH
- 2006: Willem van Heythuysen at the Virginia Museum of Fine Arts, Richmond, VA
- 2007: Kehinde Wiley: The World Stage—China at the John Michael Kohler Arts Center, Sheboygan, WI
- 2008: Three Wise Men Greeting Entry Into Lagos at (PAFA) Pennsylvania Academy Of Fine Arts, Philadelphia, PA
- 2009: The World Stage: Africa at ArtSpace, San Antonio, TX
- 2009: Black Light at Deitch Projects, New York City
- 2010: Legends of Unity | World Cup 2010 | PUMA, several locations worldwide
- 2011: Kehinde Wiley: Selected Works at the Savannah College of Art and Design (SCAD) Museum of Art, Savannah, GA
- 2012: Kehinde Wiley/ The World Stage: Israel at The Jewish Museum, New York City
- 2011–13: The World Stage: Israel at Roberts & Tilton, Culver City, CA; traveled to Jewish Museum (New York) (2012); the Contemporary Jewish Museum, San Francisco, CA (2013); Boise Art Museum, Boise, ID (2013)
- 2013: Kehinde Wiley: Memling at Phoenix Art Museum, Phoenix, AZ
- 2015–17: Kehinde Wiley: A New Republic at the Brooklyn Museum (2015), Brooklyn, NY; traveled to Modern Art Museum of Fort Worth, Fort Worth, TX (2016); Virginia Museum of Fine Arts, Richmond, VA (2016); Seattle Art Museum, Seattle, WA (2016); Phoenix Art Museum, Phoenix, AZ (2016); Toledo Museum of Art, Toledo, OH (2017), Oklahoma City Museum of Art (2017)
- 2018 October 19 – February 10, 2019: Kehinde Wiley at St. Louis Museum of Art, St. Louis, MO.
- 2021–22: Kehinde Wiley at the National Gallery: The Prelude, National Gallery, London
- 2023–24 Kehinde Wiley: An Archaeology of Silence at the Fine Arts Museums of San Francisco and Museum of Fine Arts Houston, Houston, Texas.

== Collections ==
- Brooklyn Museum in Brooklyn, New York
- Columbus Museum of Art in Columbus, Ohio
- Crocker Art Museum in Sacramento, California
- Detroit Institute of Arts (DIA) in Detroit, Michigan
- Gibbes Museum of Art in Charleston, SC
- Hammer Museum, in Los Angeles, California
- Harn Museum of Art in Gainesville, Florida
- Harvard Art Museums in Cambridge, Massachusetts
- High Museum of Art in Atlanta, Georgia
- Jewish Museum in New York City, New York
- Los Angeles County Museum of Art in Los Angeles, California
- Milwaukee Art Museum in Milwaukee, Wisconsin
- Minneapolis Institute of Art in Minneapolis, Minnesota
- Mint Museum in Charlotte, North Carolina
- Modern Art Museum of Fort Worth in Fort Worth, Texas
- Musée des beaux-arts de Montréal in Montreal, Canada
- Museum of Fine Arts in Boston, Massachusetts
- Museum of Fine Arts in St. Petersburg, Florida
- Nasher Museum of Art in Durham, North Carolina
- National Portrait Gallery in Washington, D.C.
- Nelson-Atkins Museum of Art in Kansas City, Missouri
- Nerman Museum of Contemporary Art in Overland Park, Kansas
- North Carolina Museum of Art in Raleigh, North Carolina
- Oak Park Public Library in Oak Park, Illinois
- Pérez Art Museum Miami, Florida
- Philbrook Museum of Art in Tulsa, Oklahoma
- Phoenix Art Museum in Phoenix, Arizona
- Portland Art Museum in Portland, Oregon
- Saint Louis Art Museum in St. Louis, Missouri
- San Antonio Museum of Art in San Antonio, Texas
- San Francisco Museum of Modern Art in San Francisco, California
- Seattle Art Museum in Seattle, Washington
- Studio Museum in Harlem in New York City, New York
- Toledo Museum of Art in Toledo, Ohio
- Virginia Museum of Fine Arts in Richmond, Virginia
- Wadsworth Atheneum in Hartford, Connecticut
- Walker Art Center in Minneapolis, Minnesota
