= List of works by Kehinde Wiley =

The following is a partial list of artworks by the American artist Kehinde Wiley (born 1977).

== Partial list of works ==
=== Painting ===
Image	Title	Date	Size (cm)	Museum/Collection	Medium	Notes	Ref
	Passing / Posing Untitled	2001	60 x 40 in	-	Oil on canvas		
	Passing / Posing #11	2002	60 x 40 in	-	Oil and enamel on canvas		
	Passing / Posing #12	2002	60 x 48 in	-	Oil on canvas		
	Passing / Posing #13	2002	60 x 40 in	-	Oil on fabric		
	Passing / Posing #15	2002	56 x 48 in	-	Oil and enamel on canvas		
	Passing / Posing Go	2003	121.9 cm (48 in) x 304.8 cm (120 in) x 6.4 cm (2.5 in) (five panels; numbered a-e)	Brooklyn Museum, New York City	Oil on panel		
	Passing/Posing (Female Prophet Anne, Who Observes the Presentation of Jesus in the Temple)	2003	96 x 60 x 1 1/2 in (243.8 x 152.4 x 3.8 cm)	Brooklyn Museum, New York City	Oil on canvas mounted on panel		
	Passing/Posing (Assumption)	2003	96 x 60 x 1 1/2 in (243.8 x 152.4 x 3.8 cm)	Brooklyn Museum, New York City	Oil on canvas mounted on panel		
	Passing/Posing (Immaculate Consumption)	2003	96 x 60 x 1 1/2 in (243.8 x 152.4 x 3.8 cm)	Brooklyn Museum, New York City	Oil on canvas mounted on panel		
	Passing/Posing (Female Prophet Deborah)	2003	96 x 60 x 1 1/2 in (243.8 x 152.4 x 3.8 cm)	Brooklyn Museum, New York City	Oil on canvas mounted on panel		
	Saint Francis of Paola	2003	82 x 70 in. (208.3 x 177.8 cm)	Toledo Museum of Art, Toledo, Ohio	Oil on canvas		
	Napoleon Leading the Army over the Alps	2005	108 x 108 in (274.3 x 274.3 cm)	Brooklyn Museum, New York City	Oil on panel	Part of the Rumors of War series. After Jacques-Louis David's Napoleon Crossing the Alps (1801).	
	Equestrian Portrait of the Count-Duke Olivares	2005	108 x 108 in	-	Oil and enamel on canvas	Part of the Rumors of War series. After Diego Velázquez's Equestrian Portrait of the Count-Duke of Olivares (1636).	
	St. Andrew	2006	96 x 84 in	Chrysler Museum of Art, Norfolk, Virginia	Oil and enamel on canvas	Part of the Scenic series. After Saint Andrew by Hans Holbein the Younger (1521)	
	Charles I and Henrietta Maria	2006	84 x 96 in	-	Oil and enamel on canvas	Part of the Scenic series. After Charles I and Henrietta Maria Holding a Laurel Wreath by Anthony van Dyck (1632). Sold at Sotheby's for $143,000 in June 2014.	
	Design for a Stained Glass Window with Wild Man	2006	96 x 72 in	-	Oil on canvas	Part of the Scenic series. After Design for a Stained Glass Window with Wild Man by Hans Holbein the Younger (1528)	
	Saint Adrian	2006	96 x 84 in	-	Oil on canvas	Part of the Scenic series. After Saint Adrian by Hans Holbein the Younger (1522)	
	The Apostle Peter	2006	96 x 72 in	-	Oil on canvas	Part of the Scenic series. After The Apostle Peter by Hans Holbein the Younger (1527)	
	Le Roi de la Chasse	2006	96 x 72 in	-	Oil on canvas	Part of the Scenic series. After Anthony van Dyck's Charles I at the Hunt (1635)	
	The Capture of Juliers	2006	84 x 96 in	-	Oil and enamel on canvas	Part of the Rumors of War series. After Peter Paul Rubens's The Capture of Juliers (1622).	
	Prince Tommaso Francesco of Savoy Carignano	2006	96 x 96 in	-	Oil and enamel on canvas	Part of the Rumors of War series. After Anthony van Dyck's Equestrian Portrait of Thomas Francis, Prince of Carignano (1634).	
	Bamboo Shoots	2007	96 x 72 in	-	Oil on canvas	Part of the China series.	
	Design for a Stained Glass Window with Wild Man II	2007	96 x 72 in	-	Oil on canvas	Part of the China series.	
	Ivelaw I	2007	28.5 x 22.5 in	-	Oil on canvas	Part of the China series.	
	Romaine III	2007	37.5 x 30.5 in	-	Oil on canvas	Part of the China series.	
	Romanine I	2007	25.6 x 22 in	-	Oil on canvas	Part of the China series.	
	Cheick I	2007	46 x 34 in	-	Oil and enamel on canvas	Part of the China series.	
	Acting in Accordance with Chairman Mao's Instructions Means Victory	2007	72 x 60 in	-	Oil on canvas	Part of the China series.	
	Support the Rural Population and Serve 500 Million Peasants	2007	72 x 60 in	-	Oil and enamel on canvas	Part of the China series.	
	Regard the Class Struggle as the Main Link in the Chain	2007	96 x 72 in	-	Oil and enamel on canvas	Part of the China series.	
	Two Heroic Sisters of the Grassland	2007	96 x 72 in	-	Oil and enamel on canvas	Part of the China series.	
	Encourage Good Manners and politeness: Brighten Up Your Surroundings with Plants	2007	60 x 60 in	-	Oil and enamel on canvas	Part of the China series.	
	Learn from Comrade Guofu!	2007	96 x 84 in	-	Oil and enamel on canvas	Part of the China series.	
	Carry Out the Four Modernisations of the Fatherland	2007	96 x 72 in	-	Oil on canvas	Part of the China series.	
	Celebrating with Great Joy and Enthusiasm the Publication of the Constitution of the People's Republic of China	2007	96 x 84 in	-	Oil on canvas	Part of the China series.	
	Threefold Defence	2007	84 x 96 in	-	Oil and enamel on canvas	Part of the China series.	
	Defend and Develop the Island Together	2007	96 x 72 in	-	Oil on canvas	Part of the China series.	
	Le Roi de la Chasse II	2007	108 x 108 in	-	Oil and enamel on canvas	Part of the Rumors of War series. After Anthony van Dyck's Charles I at the Hunt (1635). Sold at Sotheby's for $350,000 in June 2020.	
	Officer of the Hussars	2007	108 x 106 in	Detroit Institute of Arts	Oil on canvas	Part of the Rumors of War series. After Théodore Géricault’s The Officer of the Hussars (1812).	
	Femme Piquee Par Un Serpent	2008	102 x 300 in	-	Oil on canvas	Part of the Down series	
	Gettysburg Memorial	2008	50 x 134.5 in	-	Oil on canvas	Part of the Down series	
	A Dead Soldier	2008	60 x 144 in	-	Oil on canvas	Part of the Down series	
	Morpheus	2008	108 x 180 in	-	Oil on canvas	Part of the Down series	
	Sleep	2008	132 x 300 in	-	Oil on canvas	Part of the Down series	
	The Virgin Martyr St. Cecilia	2008	101.5 x 226.5 in	-	Oil on canvas	Part of the Down series	
	The Lamentation Over the Dead Christ	2008	131 x 112 in	-	Oil on canvas	Part of the Down series	
	Christian Martyr Tarcisius	2008	83.9 x 180 in	-	Oil on canvas	Part of the Down series	
	The Veiled Christ	2008	81.9 x 215 in	-	Oil on canvas	Part of the Down series	
	Benin Mother and Child	2008	72 x 60 in	-	Oil on canvas	Part of The World Stage: Lagos & Dakar series	
	Dogon Couple	2008	96 x 84 in	-	Oil on canvas	Part of The World Stage: Lagos & Dakar series	
	Hunger	2008	96 x 84 in	-	Oil on canvas	Part of The World Stage: Lagos & Dakar series	
	Ibrahima Sacho II	2008	26 x 22 in	-	Oil on canvas	Part of The World Stage: Lagos & Dakar series	
	Matar Mbaye II	2008	26 x 22 in	-	Oil on canvas	Part of The World Stage: Lagos & Dakar series	
	On Top of the World	2008	72 x 60 in	-	Oil on canvas	Part of The World Stage: Lagos & Dakar series	
	Place Soweto (National Assembly)	2008	96 x 72 in	-	Oil on canvas	Part of The World Stage: Lagos & Dakar series	
	Rubin Singleton	2008	96 x 72 in	-	Oil on canvas	Part of The World Stage: Lagos & Dakar series	
	Soly Cisse	2008	47 x 31 in	-	Oil on canvas	Part of The World Stage: Lagos & Dakar series	
	Three Wise Men Greeting Entry Into Lagos	2008	72 x 96 in	-	Oil on canvas	Part of The World Stage: Lagos & Dakar series	
	Tosin Otegbole	2008	26 x 22 in	-	Oil on canvas	Part of The World Stage: Lagos & Dakar series	
	Jonaton Schimitt Barcellos	2008	48 x 36 in	-	Oil on canvas	Part of The World Stage: Brazil series	
	Alegoria a Lei do Ventre Livre	2009	72 x 60 in	-	Oil on canvas	Part of The World Stage: Brazil series	
	Anderson S. da Fonseca	2009	48 x 36 in	-	Oil on canvas	Part of The World Stage: Brazil series	
	Bernardo O'Higgins	2009	72 x 60 in	-	Oil on canvas	Part of The World Stage: Brazil series	
	Fall	2009	72 x 60 in	-	Oil on canvas	Part of The World Stage: Brazil series	
	Jefferson	2009	48 x 36 in	-	Oil on canvas	Part of The World Stage: Brazil series	
	Joao Caetano	2009	78 x 60 in	-	Oil on canvas	Part of The World Stage: Brazil series	
	Vagner Rodrigues Gomes	2009	48 x 36 in	-	Oil on canvas	Part of The World Stage: Brazil series	
	Marechal Floriano Peixoto	2009	96 x 84 in	-	Oil on canvas	Part of The World Stage: Brazil series	
	Nelson Silva Eaflanzino Jr.	2009	48 x 36 in	-	Oil on canvas	Part of The World Stage: Brazil series	
	Omen Negro	2009	96 x 84 in	-	Oil on canvas	Part of The World Stage: Brazil series	
	Randerson Romualdo Cordeiro	2008	48 x 36 in	-	Oil on canvas	Part of The World Stage: Brazil series	
	Santos Dumont - The Father of Aviation I	2009	72 x 60 in	-	Oil on canvas	Part of The World Stage: Brazil series	
	Santos Dumont - The Father of Aviation II	2009	78 x 156 in	-	Oil on canvas	Part of The World Stage: Brazil series	
	Santos Dumont - The Father of Aviation III	2009	72 x 96 in	-	Oil on canvas	Part of The World Stage: Brazil series	
	Count Potocki	2008	108 x 108 in	-	Oil and enamel on canvas	Part of the Rumors of War series. After Jacques-Louis David's Portrait of Count Stanislas Potocki (1681).	
	Thiogo Gliveira do Rosario	2009	48 x 36 in	-	Oil on canvas	Part of The World Stage: Brazil series	
	Annoyed Radha with Her Friends	2010	72 x 96 in	-	Oil on canvas	Part of The World Stage: India & Sri Lanka series	
	Bonaparte in the Great Mosque of Cairo	2010	60 x 72 in	-	Oil on canvas	Part of The World Stage: India & Sri Lanka series	
	The Desert	2010	45 x 36 in	-	Oil on canvas	Part of The World Stage: India & Sri Lanka series	
	Egyptian Landscape with Setting Sun	2010	60 x 48 in	-	Oil on canvas	Part of The World Stage: India & Sri Lanka series	
	Femme Fellah	2010	45 x 36 in	-	Oil on canvas	Part of The World Stage: India & Sri Lanka series	
	Nandikesvara	2010	45 x 36 in	-	Oil on canvas	Part of The World Stage: India & Sri Lanka series	
	The White Slave	2010	84 x 96 in	-	Oil on canvas	Part of The World Stage: India & Sri Lanka series	
	Colonel Platoff on His Charger	2008	108 x 108 in	Modern Art Museum of Fort Worth, Fort Worth, Texas	Oil and enamel on canvas	Part of the Rumors of War series. After James Ward's Colonel Platoff on His Charger (1816)	
	Equestrian Portrait of King Philip II (Michael Jackson)	2010	128 x 110 in	Olbricht Collection, Berlin	Oil on canvas	Commissioned by Michael Jackson, and was posthumously completed. After Peter Paul Reubens's Philip II on Horseback (1640).	
	The White Slave	2010	84" X 96"	SRI LANKA	Oil on canvas		
	Egyptian Landscape with Setting Sun	2010	60" X 48"	SRI LANKA	Oil on canvas		
	Shantavia Beale II	2012	60 x 48 in	Collection of Ana and Lenny Gravier	Oil on canvas	-	
	Judith and Holofernes	2012	120 x 90 in.	North Carolina Museum of Art, Raleigh, North Carolina	Oil on linen	Part of the Economy of Grace series.	
	Portrait of Anne Cynthia Petit VII	2014	60H X 48W IN	Lamentations Exhibit	Oil on linen		
	Christ After Lady Macbeth I	2016	96H X 60W IN	Lamentations Exhibit	Oil on Canvas		
	Christ After Lady Macbeth II	2016	96H X 60W IN	Lamentations Exhibit	Oil on canvas		
	The Lamentation	2016	96H X 192W IN	Lamentations Exhibit	Oil on canvas		
	Portrait of Wangechi Mutu, Mamiwata	2017	94H X 120W IN	Trickster Exhibition	Oil on Canvas		
	Portrait of Mahogany Jones and Marcus	2018	108H X 84W IN	Saint Louis Collection	Oil on Canvas		
	Margaret, Countess of Blessington	2018	Measurements Unknown	Stephen P. Harn Museum of Art, Gainesville, Florida, United States	Oil on panel	On loan in the Metamorphosis: Reshaping Contemporary Art Exhibit	
	President Barack Obama	2018	213.7 cm (84.1 in) × 147 cm (58 in) × 3.2 cm (1.3 in)	National Portrait Gallery, Washington, D.C.	Oil on panel	Was publicly unveiled with Amy Sherald's portrait of Michelle Obama, First Lady Michelle Obama, at the National Portrait Gallery in February 2018.	
	Untitled (Copley)	2022		Collection of Nancy and Sean Cotton, on loan to the Detroit Institute of Arts	Oil on canvas	After John Singleton Copley's Watson and the Shark (1786)	

=== Sculpture ===
Image	Title	Date	Size (cm)	Museum	Medium	Ref
	Houdon Paul-Louis	2011	34 x 26 x 19 in (86.4 x 66 x 48.3 cm)	Brooklyn Museum, New York City	Bronze with polished stone base	
	Bound	2014	65 x 45 1/2 x 44 in (165.1 x 115.6 x 111.8 cm)	Brooklyn Museum, New York City	Bronze	
	Rumors of War	2018	27' 4 7/8" in high x 25' 5 7/8" in long x 15' 9 5/8"	Virginia Museum of Fine Arts, Richmond	Bronze with stone pedestal	

=== Stained glass ===
Image	Title	Date	Size	Museum	Medium	Notes	Ref
Stained glass window in a romanesque arch shape. A young black man with a golden halo, wearing modern clothes, standing on a white and gold plinth inscribed "Mark Shavers". He is holding an egg in one hand, and a book, orb and scepter in the other hand. The background is a deep blue, and the window is framed with geometric patterns	Saint Adelaide	2014	251.3 cm (98.9 in) × 115.7 cm (45.6 in)	The Stained Glass Museum, Ely, United Kingdom	Stained glass window	Based on an 1843 stained glass window of Saint Adelaide, designed by Jean-Auguste-Dominique Ingres and manufactured by Sèvres for the Chapel of Saint Ferdinand, Paris.	
	THE VIRGIN AND CHILD ENTHRONED	2016	97.91H X 46.18W IN	Lamentations Exhibit	Stained glass in aluminum frame		
	Go	2020	17'6" long × 55'8" wide × 10" deep	Moynihan Train Hall, Penn Station, New York City	Stained glass triptych	Across the ceiling of the 33rd Street entrance to the station. Depicts breakdancers in the sky.	
