= King John III Museum in Wilanów =

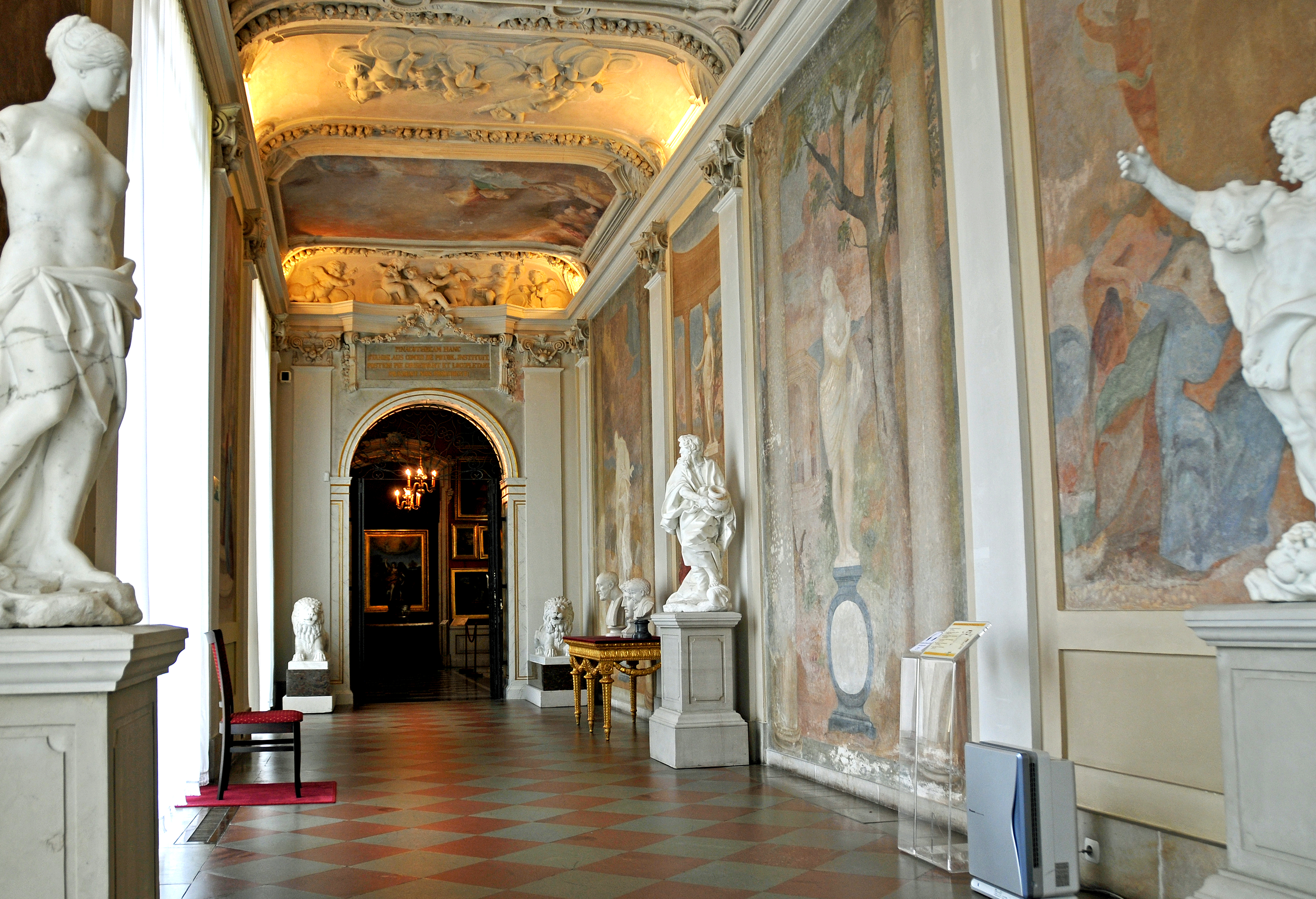
- Interior of the Wilanów Palace
- Interactive fullscreen map
- Established: 1805
- Location: ul. Stanislawa Kostki Potockiego 10/16; Warsaw, Poland
- Coordinates: 52°09′55″N 21°05′25″E
- Type: palace museum
- Director: Paweł Jaskanis
- Website: wilanow-palac.pl

The King John III Museum in Wilanów (Polish: Muzeum Pałacu Króla Jana III w Wilanowie) is a museum in Warsaw, Poland considered to be one of the oldest in the country and the repository of the country's royal and artistic heritage. The collection consists of valuables collected by subsequent owners of the Wilanów Palace, the kings of Poland — John III Sobieski and Augustus II, as well as by representatives of noble families of Potocki, and Lubomirski and a collection of Sarmatian art.

== History ==
The Wilanów Palace was first opened to the public in 1805, when the owners of the palace, Stanisław Kostka Potocki and his wife Aleksandra Lubomirska created a museum, one of the first public museums in Poland. In 1877 the museum was popularized by the publication entitled Wilanów. Album widoków i pamiątek... edited by Hipolit Skimborowicz and Wojciech Gerson. This was followed in 1893 by a guide to the palace and its collections.

After the Second World War, the palace was renovated, and most of the collection, which had been stolen by Nazi Germany, was repatriated. Under the Communist agrarian reform, the Wilanów estate became the property of the state. In 1954 the extensive revitalization palace and the park began in 1962 with the opening of the museum as a branch of the National Museum, Warsaw. In following years the number of visitors to the palace and gardens reached 400,000 people per year. In 1983, on the occasion of the 300th anniversary of the Battle of Vienna, the museum organized a jubilee exhibition "Glory and fame of John III in art and literature". In 1995 the Palace Museum was established as an independent entity under the Ministry of Culture and National Heritage.

The museum regularly organizes temporary exhibitions, conferences and seminars, conducts research, publishes books and organizes educational activities dedicated to both cultural and natural values of the Wilanów residence. In September 2013 the museum was renamed as the Museum of King John III's Palace at Wilanów.

== Collection ==
The palace's collection started with its establishment by King John III Sobieski, who collected works of art and objects of everyday use. Only a fraction of King's collection survived to this day in the museum's current holdings, including two still life paintings by Abraham Mignon, portrait paintings and furnishings like Chinese quilt of Kings' wife Marysieńka. Originally the royal belongings included 6 paintings by Rembrandt and Johannes Vermeer's The Love Letter, scattered after King's death. The subsequent owners re-established and enriched the collection with paintings by Lucas Cranach the Elder, Peter Paul Rubens, Jan Lievens, Charles Le Brun, Pompeo Batoni, Angelika Kauffmann and Anton Graff, among others. The Portrait of Count Stanislas Potocki, painted in 1781 by Jacques-Louis David, is among the most precious paintings of the collection. The acquisitions also included examples of European and Polish goldsmithery (e.g. Decorative platter by Hans Jacob Mair), biscuits, craft, objects from the Far East (e.g. Japanese nanban table adorned with mother-of-pearl), antiquities (e.g. Red — figure amphora by the Painter of the Louvre Gigantomachia and marble bust of a member of the Julio-Claudian dynasty) and royal memorabilia (e.g. dressing table of Queen Marie Casimire Sobieska).

== Collection highlights ==
=== Painting ===
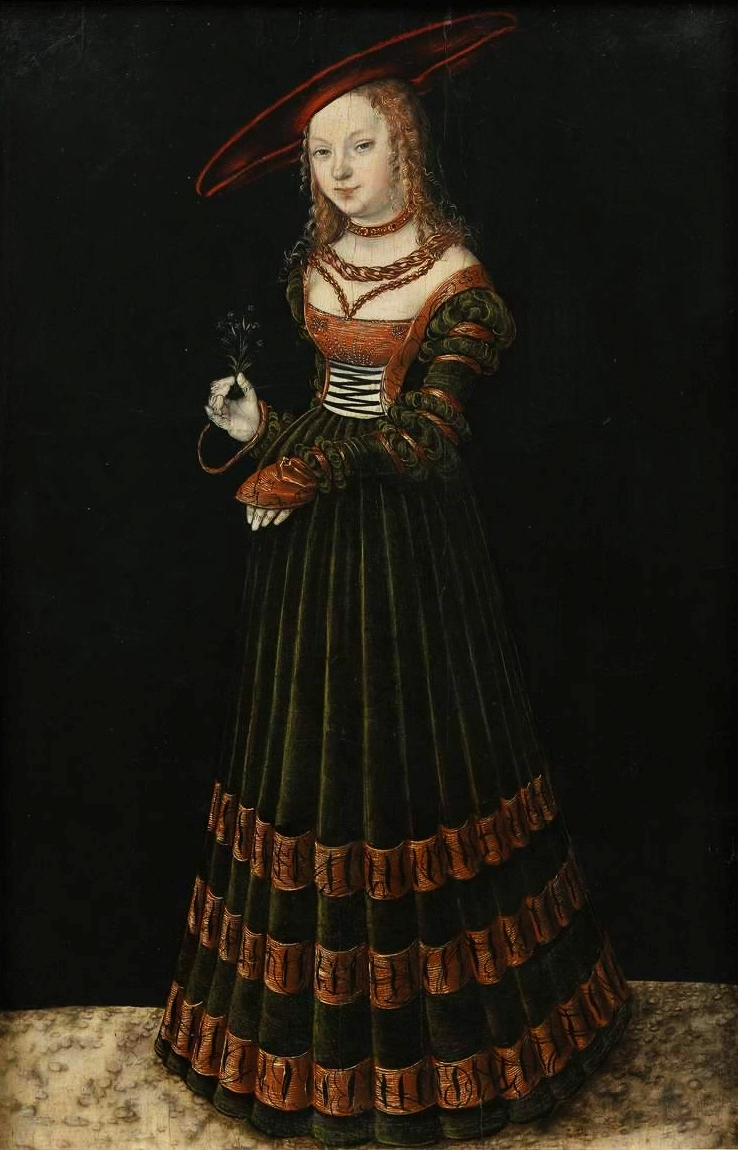
A girl with forget-me-nots, Lucas Cranach the Elder

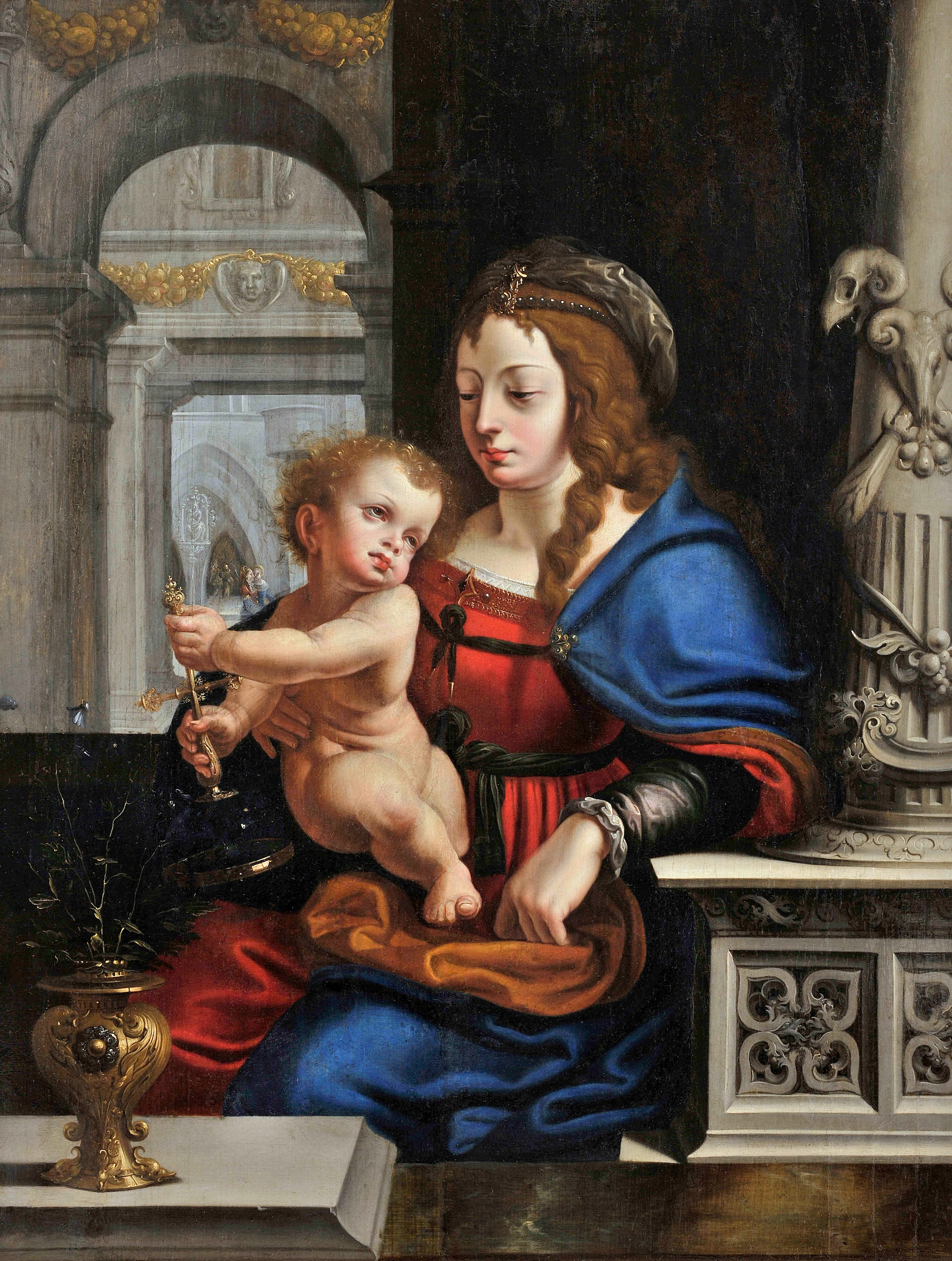
Madonna and Child, Joos van Cleve

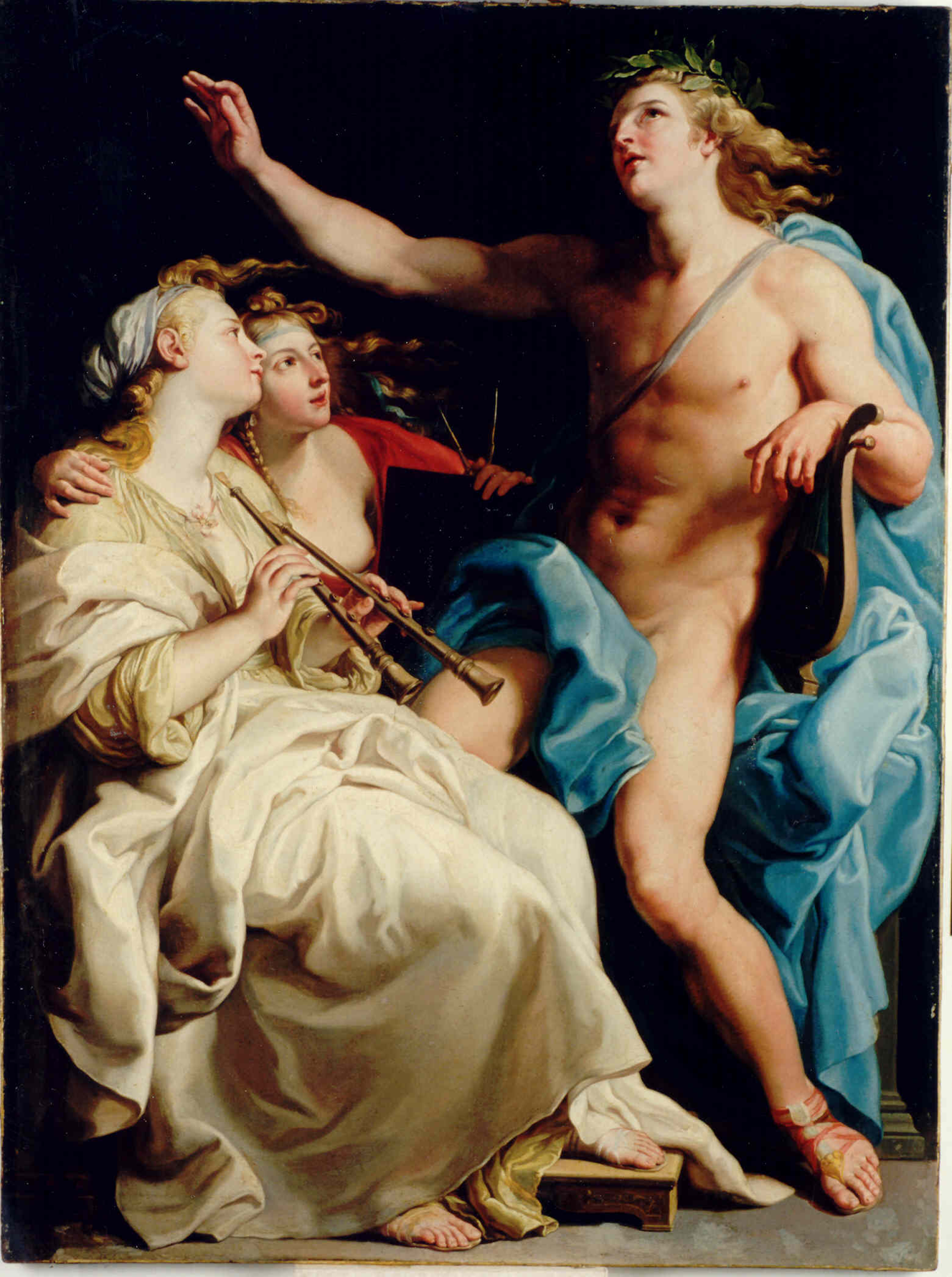
Apollo and two Muses, Pompeo Batoni

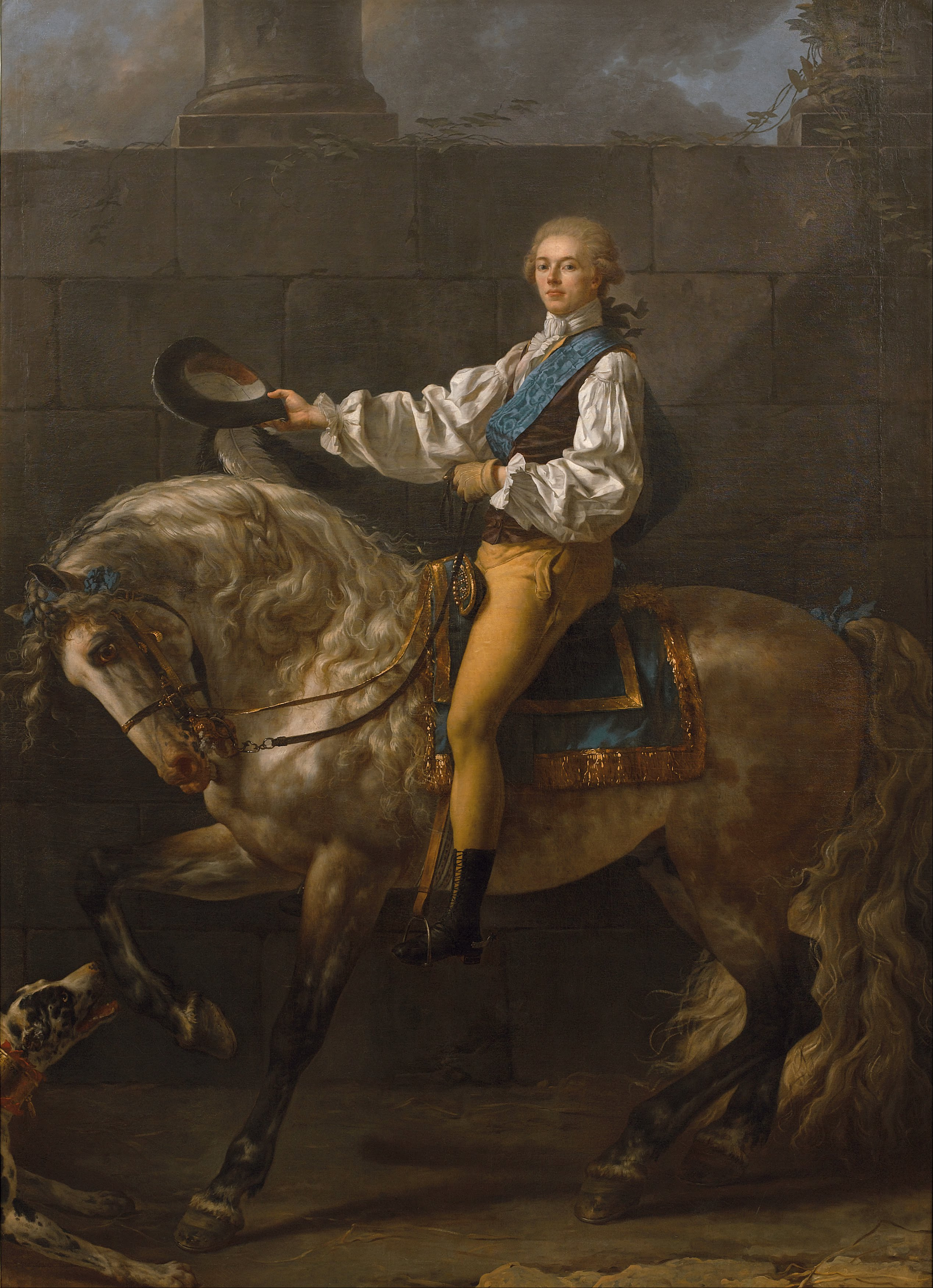
Portrait of Count Stanislas Potocki, Jacques-Louis David

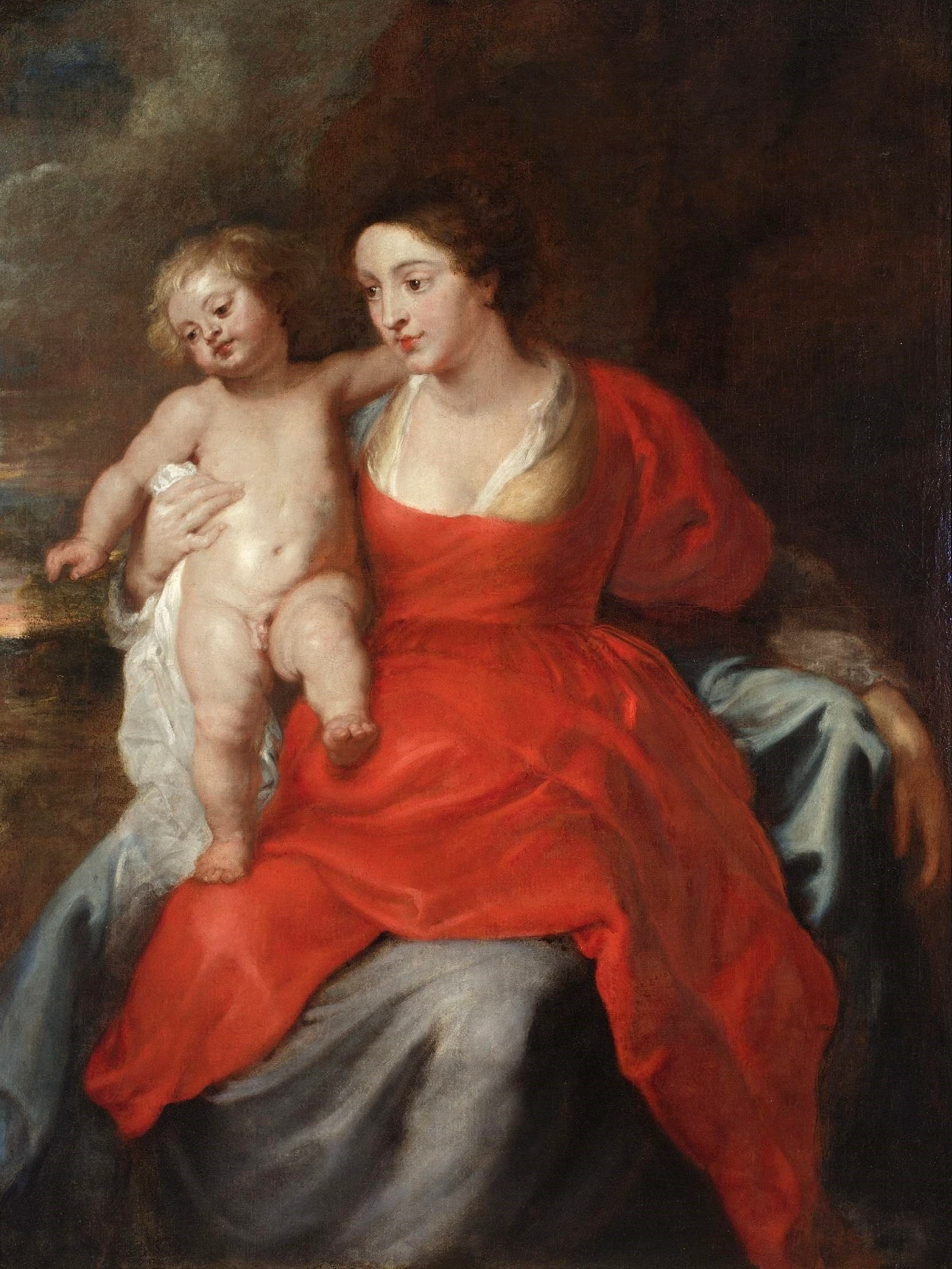
Madonna and Child, Peter Paul Rubens

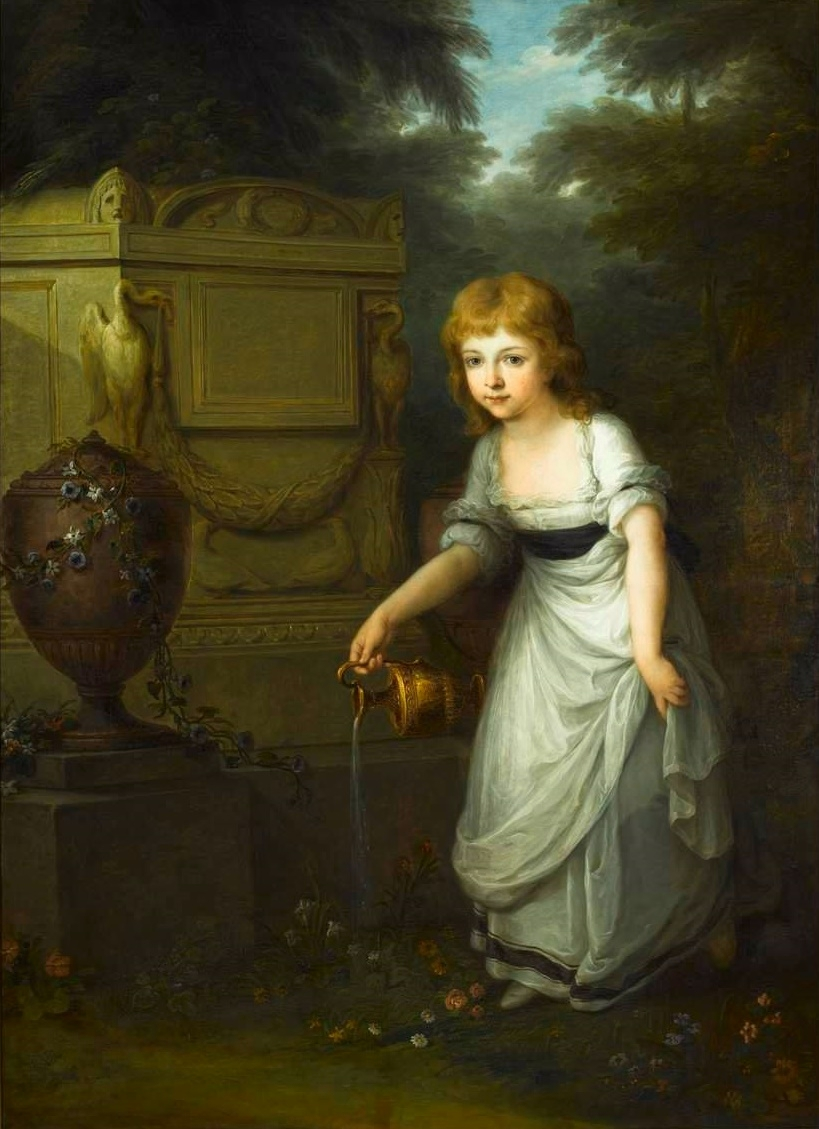
Portrait of Krystyna Potocka Watering Flowers on her Mother's Grave, Angelica Kauffmann

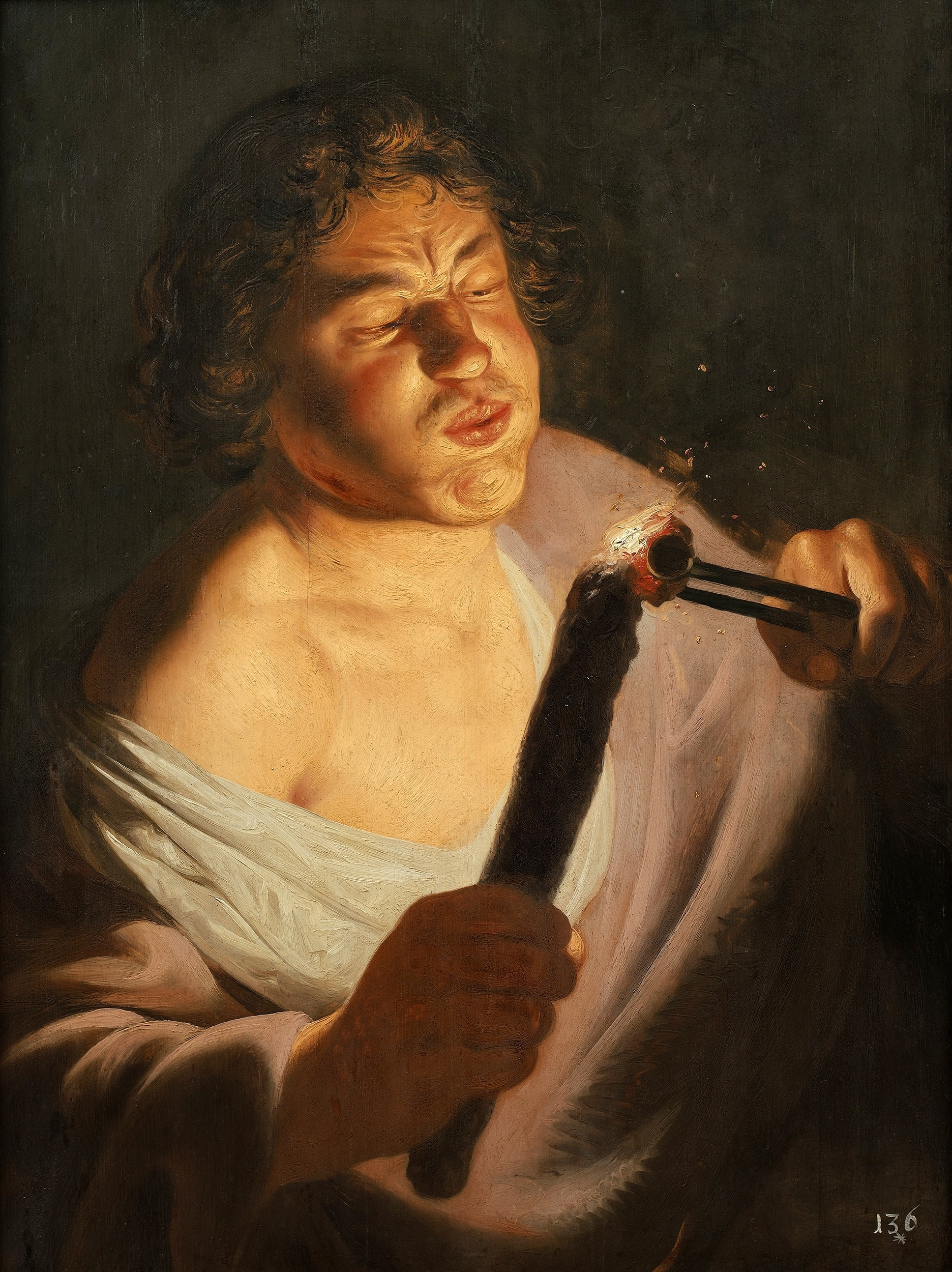
A Youth Lighting a Torch, Jan Lievens

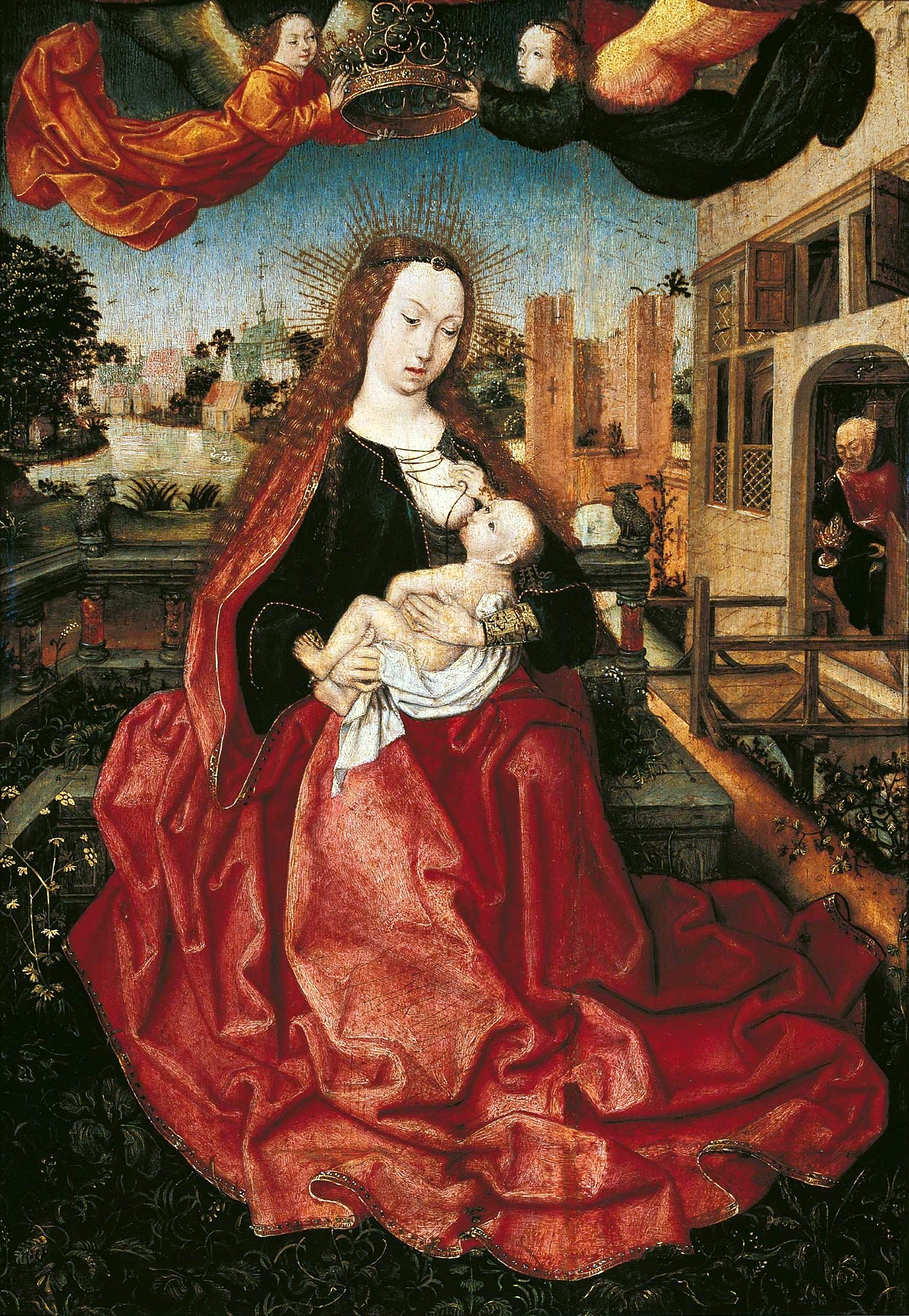
Madonna and Child, Master of Frankfurt

=== Sculpture and Applied arts ===
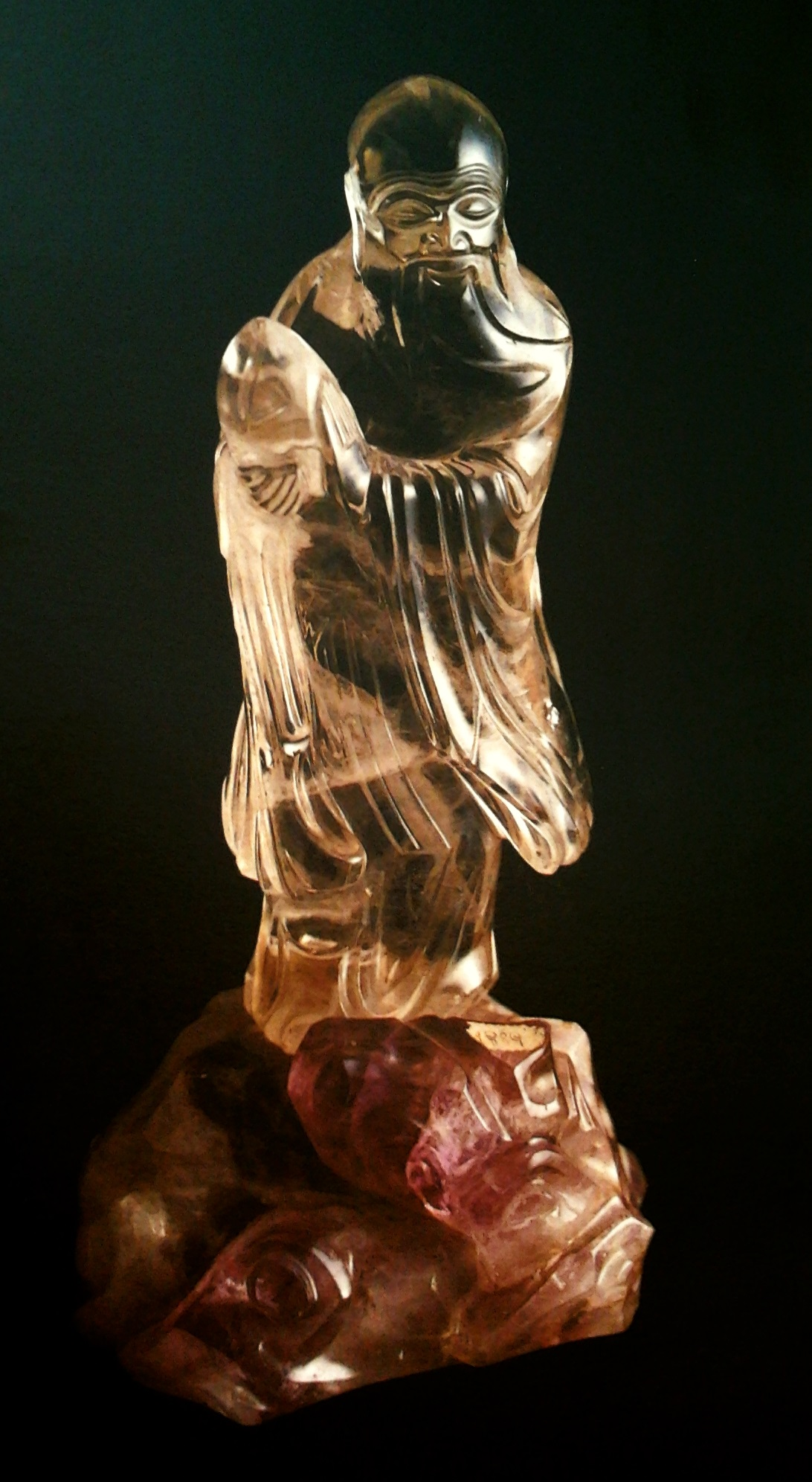
Figurine of Shou Xing, Qing Dynasty

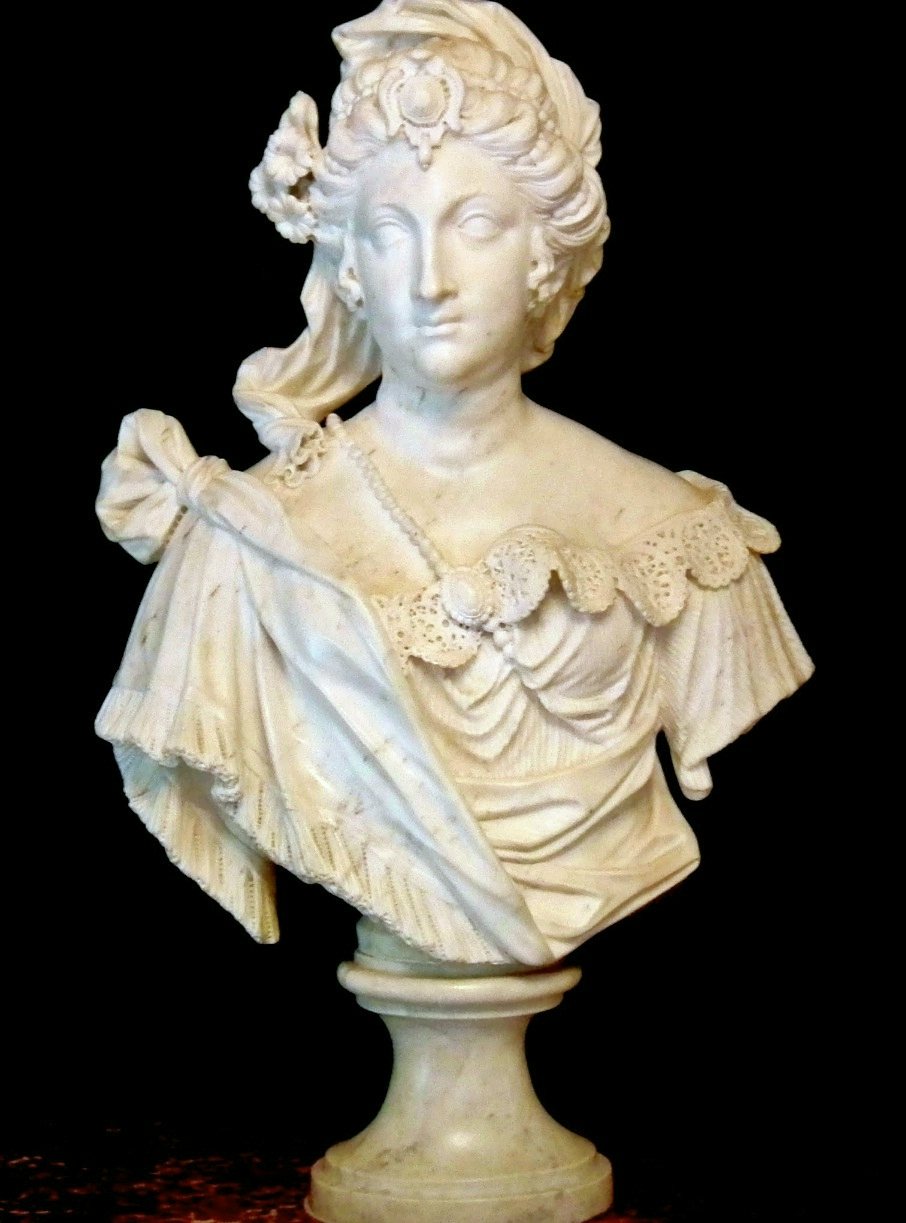
Bust of Marie Casimire Sobieska, Jacques Prou

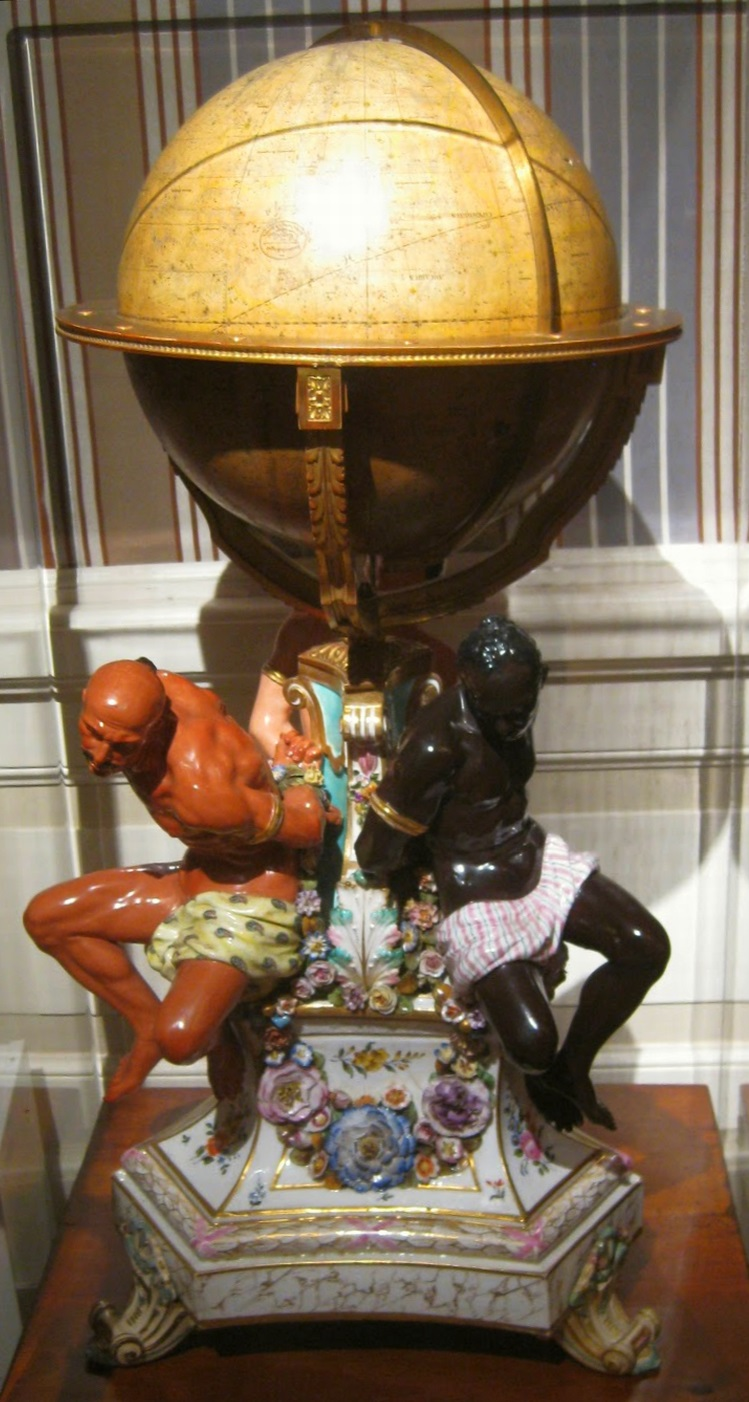
Celestial globe, by Karl Christian Ludwig Adami

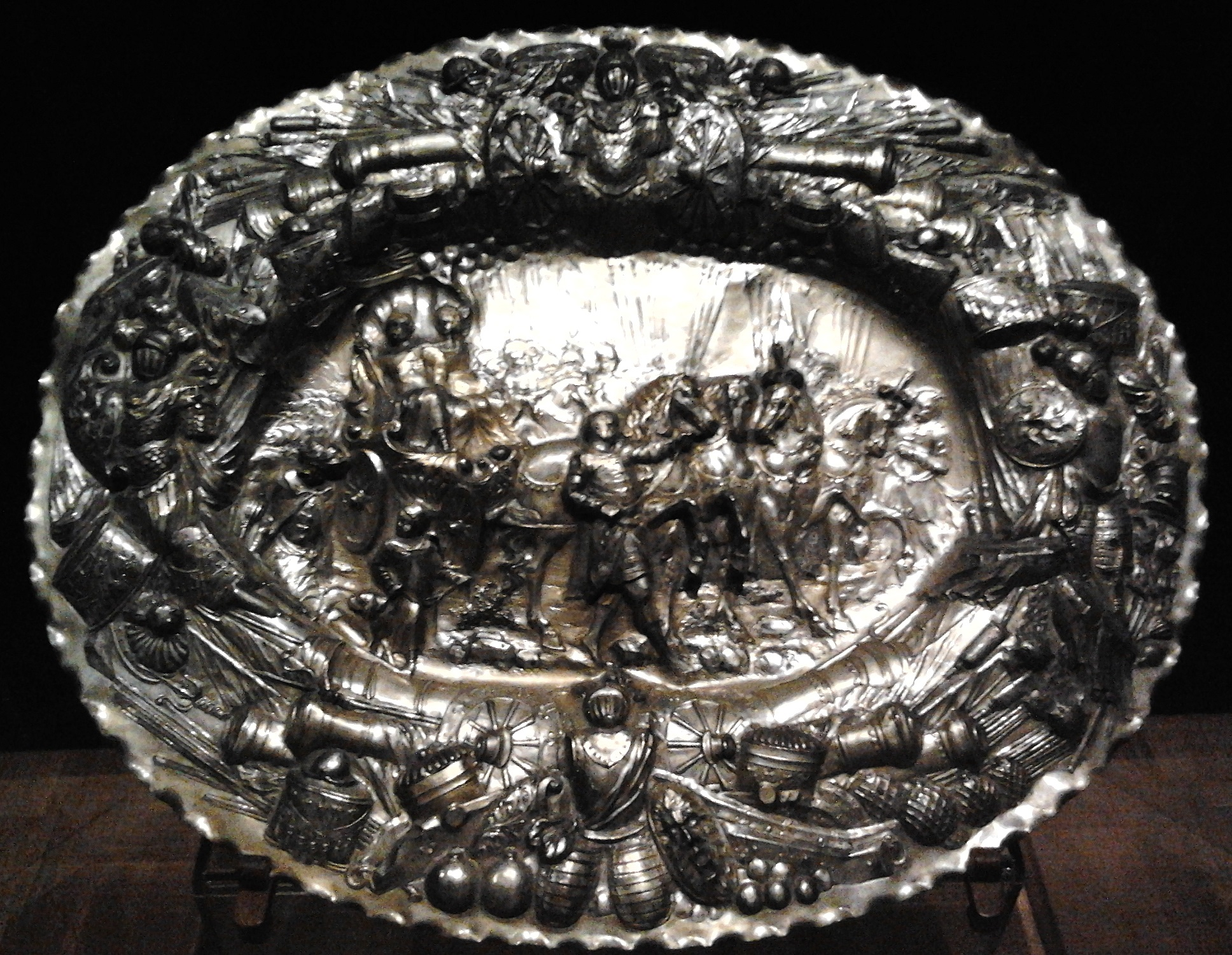
Tray with the triumph of John III, Johann Gottfried Holl

== See also ==
- Poster Museum at Wilanów
