= Equestrian Portrait of Count Stanislas Potocki =

1781 painting by Jacques-Louis David

- Portret konny Stanisława Kostki Potockiego (Polish)
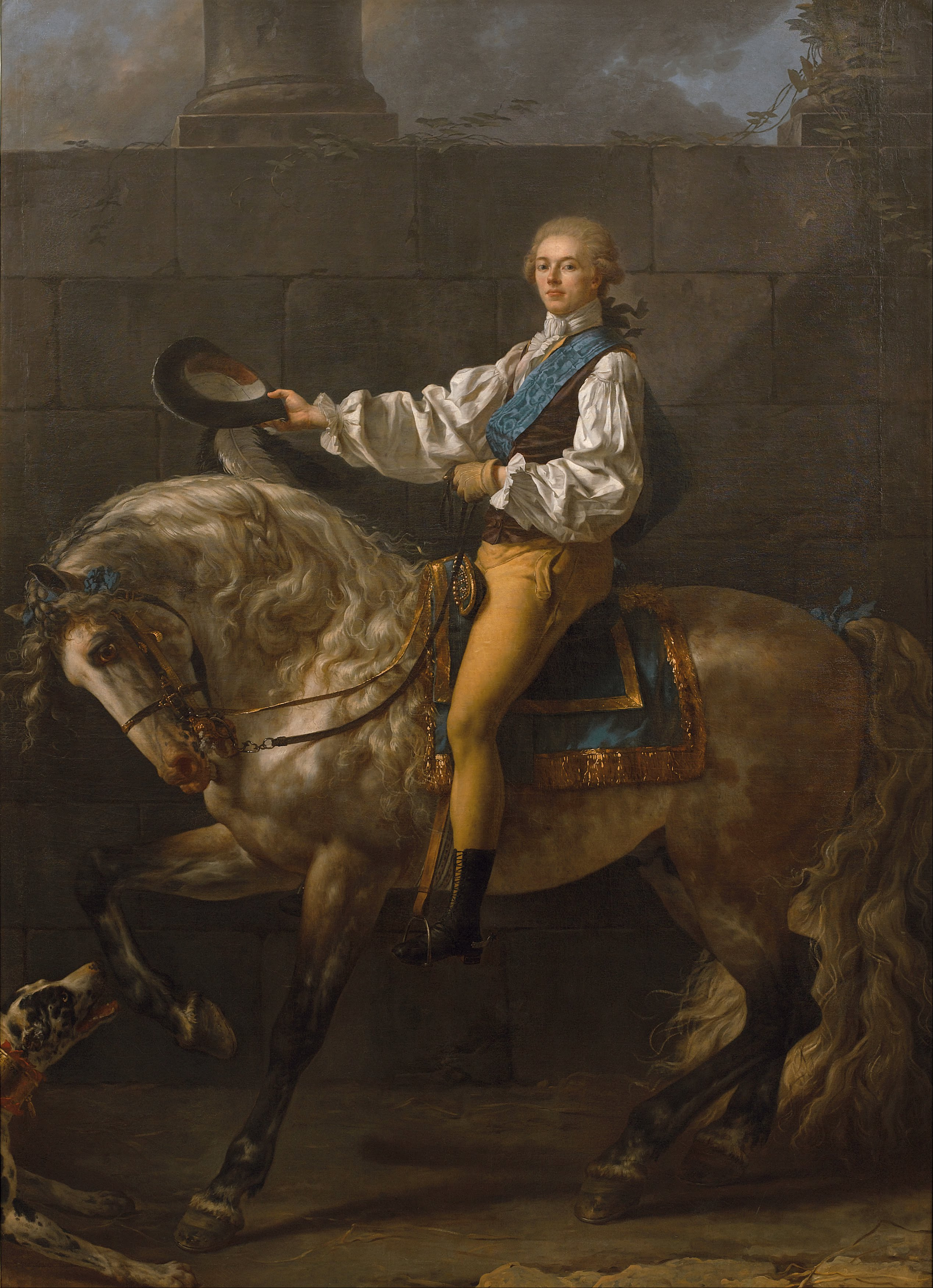
- Artist: Jacques-Louis David
- Year: 1781
- Medium: Oil on canvas
- Movement: Neo-Classicism
- Subject: Stanisław Kostka Potocki
- Dimensions: 304 cm × 218 cm (120 in × 86 in)
- Location: Museum of King Jan III's Palace at Wilanów, Warsaw

Equestrian Portrait of Count Stanislas Potocki (Polish: Portret konny Stanisława Kostki Potockiego) (Note: In this article, the spelling Stanislas is used when discussing the portrait, while Stanisław is used for its subject.) is an oil painting on canvas completed by the French Neo-Classical painter Jacques-Louis David in 1781. A large-scale equestrian portrait, the work depicts a Polish politician, nobleman, and writer of the Enlightenment Period, Stanisław Kostka Potocki. The artist shows Potocki on horseback and wearing the sash of the Polish Order of the White Eagle. As Potocki tips his hat in a welcoming gesture to the viewer, the horse bows, while a dog can be seen barking in the lower left-hand corner of the painting.

During his 1779–1780 Grand Tour, Potocki first encountered Jacques-Louis David in Italy, although the details surrounding the portrait's commission remain debated. Some historians believe Potocki directly requested it in 1780, while others suggest Ferdinand IV of Naples commissioned the work after Potocki impressed him by taming a wild horse. The portrait of Potocki was first exhibited at the Paris Salon of 1781 and brought to Warsaw sometime before 1801. That year, the work was transferred to the Wilanów Palace, built originally as a royal palace in the late 17th century for John III Sobieski, which had been owned by the Potocki family since 1799. In 1805, the palace became one of the first public art museums in Poland, displaying David's Equestrian Portrait of Count Stanislas Potocki alongside the rest of the Potocki family's art collection.

The painting was plundered by Nazi German forces in December 1944 and then transported to Germany. In 1952, Soviet officials informed the Polish government (by then, the Soviet-aligned Polish People's Republic) that the portrait was among numerous other works from the Wilanów collection that had been restituted by the USSR in the war's aftermath. In 1956, David's painting was officially returned to Poland and placed in the collection of the National Museum in Warsaw. In 1990, following the end of communist rule in Poland, it was transferred back to Wilanów and put on permanent display. Now part of the state-owned Museum of King Jan III's Palace, Equestrian Portrait of Count Stanislas Potocki has been described as one of David's masterpieces, (Note: See also: Rosenblum (1973); Levey (1993).) marking the return of equestrian portraiture to European painting of the late 18th century.

== Historical context ==
=== Jacques-Louis David (1748–1824) ===
Jacques-Louis David was a major French representative of Neo-Classicism, a style in European art emerging in the mid-18th century, influenced by the aesthetic order and monumentality of classical antiquity. Between 1775 and 1780, David lived in Rome, where he studied the paintings of Italian High Renaissance and early Baroque masters, prompting him to abandon the Rococo style, then dominant in France, in favor of an approach characterized, in the judgement of the art historian Kathryn Calley Galitz, by its precise contours, well-defined forms, and refined surfaces. David's style was also marked by a commitment to classical forms, echoing the visual language of Roman antiquity, particularly following his visit to Naples in 1779. A prolific portraitist, David pursued commissions from an array of patrons, not only the aristocracy, but also what the art historian Allison Lee Palmer has called the "enlightened middle class". While the artist's political alliances shifted over time—he actively participated in the French Revolution before being appointed "First Painter to the Emperor" by Napoleon in 1804—David remained identified with Neo-Classicism throughout his career. (Note: Regarding David's politics, Eitner wrote: "Though little is known of his opinions before 1789, there can be no doubt that he greeted the Revolution with enthusiasm and constantly supported its most radical causes. His political activity was at first confined to the Academy, in which he became the leader of a dissident faction of junior members. By enlisting the aid of the Commune of Paris, then of the National Assembly, and finally of the Jacobin Club, he managed to dismantle the privileges of the academy one by one and, as a member of the Committee of Public Instruction in 1793, obtained the decree that abolished it altogether. An admirer and friend of Robespierre, he voted for the beheading of the king and the queen (January and October 1793) and briefly presided over the Convention." Eitner (2000), p. 194)

=== Stanisław Kostka Potocki (1755–1821) ===
During his 1779–1780 Grand Tour, Potocki reportedly first met David in Italy. Potocki was a Polish nobleman who would later become an influential politician in the Polish–Lithuanian Commonwealth. He traveled extensively around Europe, visiting Italy, France, Switzerland and Germany between 1772 and 1775. In 1776, he married Aleksandra Lubomirska, a member of the aristocratic Polish Lubomirski family, and began his political activity in 1778 as a deputy to the Sejm of the Polish–Lithuanian Commonwealth from the Lublin Voivodeship.

Potocki was a patriot and would serve as a general during the Polish–Russian War of 1792, a decisive military conflict that precipitated the Second Partition of Poland in 1793. His contributions to the country were recognized by two state awards: the Order of Saint Stanislaus in 1780 and the Order of the White Eagle in 1781. Both distinctions would later be reflected in David's depiction of Potocki. A strong advocate for public education, he served as co-founder of the Warsaw Society of Friends of Science (Polish: Towarzystwo Przyjaciół Nauk) in 1800 and the University of Warsaw in 1816. Potocki was also an avid art collector with a strong interest in classical antiquity. His O sztuce u dawnych, czyli Winkelman polski (On the Art of the Ancients, or the Polish Winckelmann, 1815) was an adaptation of History of the Art of Antiquity, the 1764 treatise by the German art historian Johann Joachim Winckelmann, which followed Winckelmann's system while correcting and reordering it and extending its scope to Chinese, Chaldean, Persian, and Indian art. A comprehensive scholarly study of the history of Western ancient art, Winckelmann's book had a profound influence on the evolution of Neo-Classical art across Europe.

== Commission ==
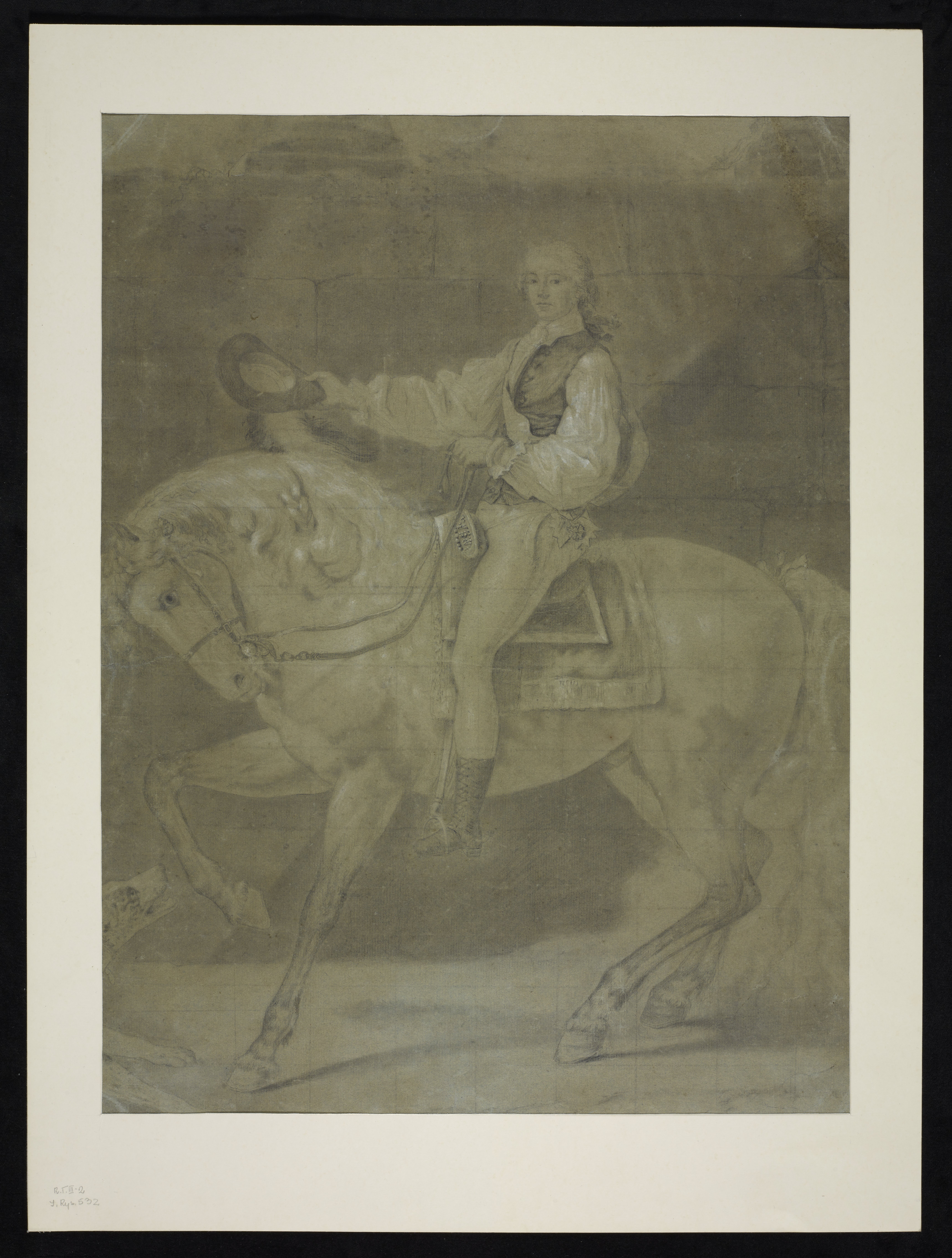
David, Sketch of Equestrian Portrait of Stanisław Kostka Potocki, 1780 (National Library of Poland)

While Potocki's travels to Italy between 1779 and 1780, which he recorded in a diary, as well as his subsequent encounter with David, have been well documented, the exact circumstances of the portrait's commission remain a subject of scholarly debate. Some art historians propose that Potocki directly requested that David paint his portrait sometime in 1780. A collection catalogue published by the Potocki family in 1834 mentioned that "the portrait was completed in Paris after a sketch made from life in the Naples Riding School". (Note: The English translation follows Schnapper (1975).)

This version of events was later confirmed by David's grandson, Jacques-Louis-Jules David, who in 1880 published an album titled Le peintre Louis David 1748–1825 celebrating the artist's oeuvre. He claimed that Ferdinand IV of Naples commissioned the painting in 1780 after Potocki had visited him in Naples. According to Jacques-Louis-Jules, Potocki impressed the king by taming a wild horse during a hunting trip, leading Ferdinand to request an equestrian portrait from David. This led some scholars to believe that David had begun painting the work in Rome in 1780 before finishing it in Paris in 1781 and exhibiting it in the same year at the Paris Salon, an official art exhibition organized by the members of the Royal Academy of Painting and Sculpture (Académie royale de peinture et de sculpture). In the 1960s, Polish art historian Andrzej Ryszkiewicz challenged this narrative, asserting a lack of historical evidence to confirm that the 1780 encounter between David and Potocki in Naples had ever transpired.

While Ryszkiewicz's claim influenced art historical research into the origins of the work in the subsequent decades, a 2019 conservation report from the Museum of King Jan III's Palace in Wilanów lent credibility to the account of David's grandson. The report analyzed x-rays of the original painting and an early modello of the composition—a preparatory study drawing initially believed to be a 19th-century sketch. The drawing portrays Potocki adorned with the Order of St. Stanislaus ribbon, awarded in 1780, rather than the Polish Order of the White Eagle, which he received in 1781. These findings led researchers to conclude that the 1780 drawing was an original work by David, created in Naples. Additionally, the x-rays exposed red paint beneath the existing blue ribbon, further substantiating the notion that the painting's initial design was meant to showcase the Order of St. Stanislaus.

== Analysis ==
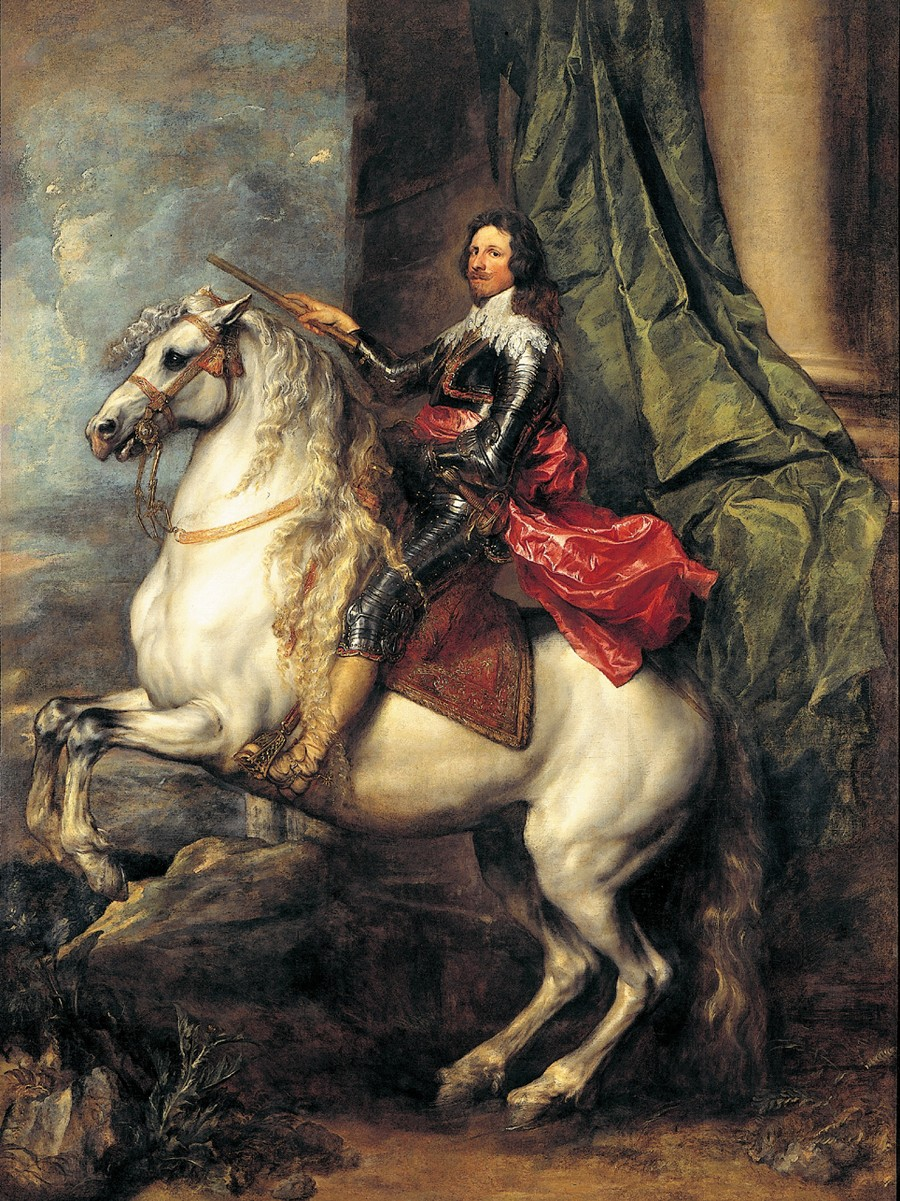
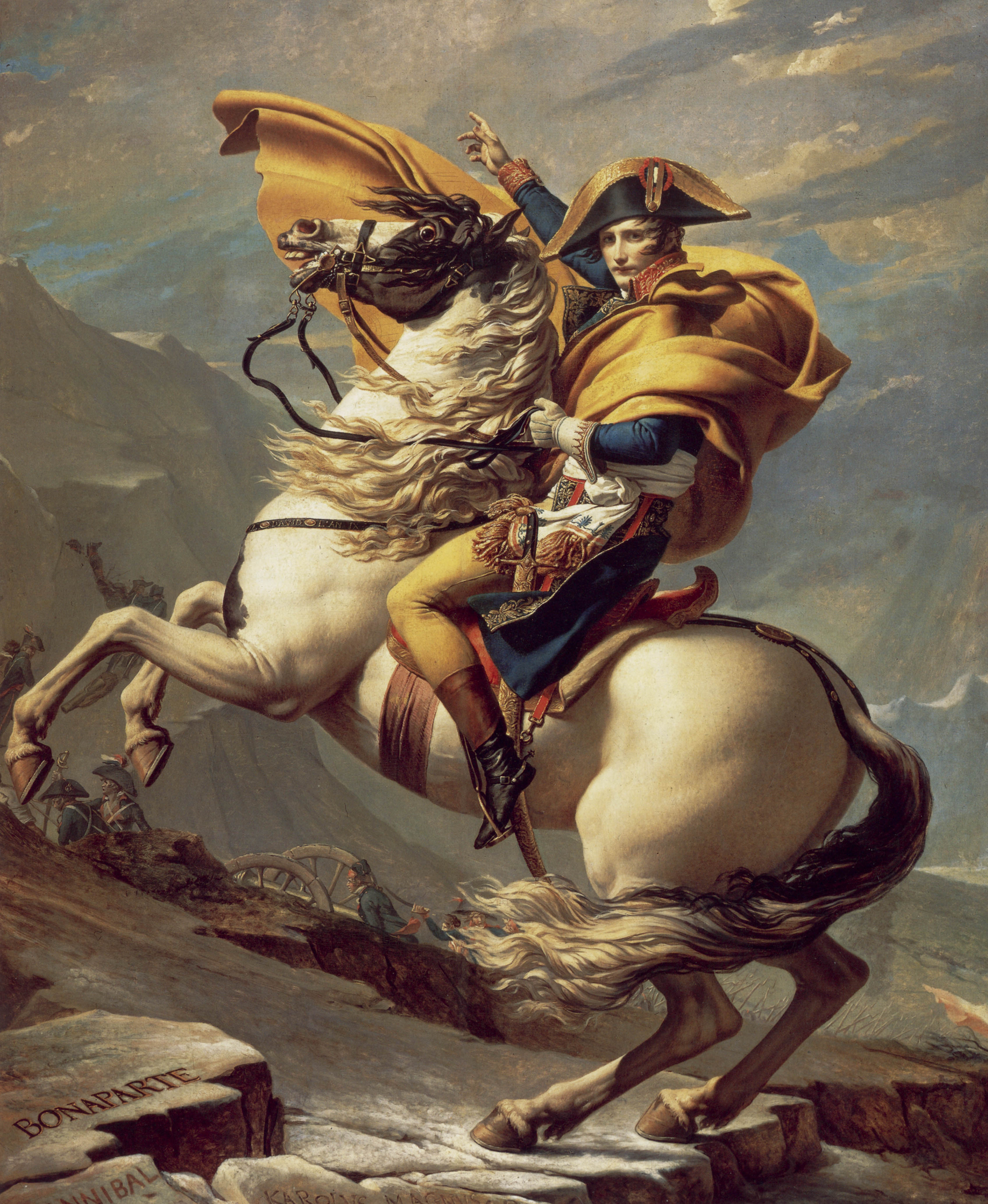
Left: Anthony van Dyck, Equestrian Portrait of Thomas Francis, Prince of Carignano, 1634 (Galleria Sabauda, Turin). Right: David, Napoleon Crossing the Alps, 1801 (Château de Malmaison, Rueil-Malmaison)

=== Description ===
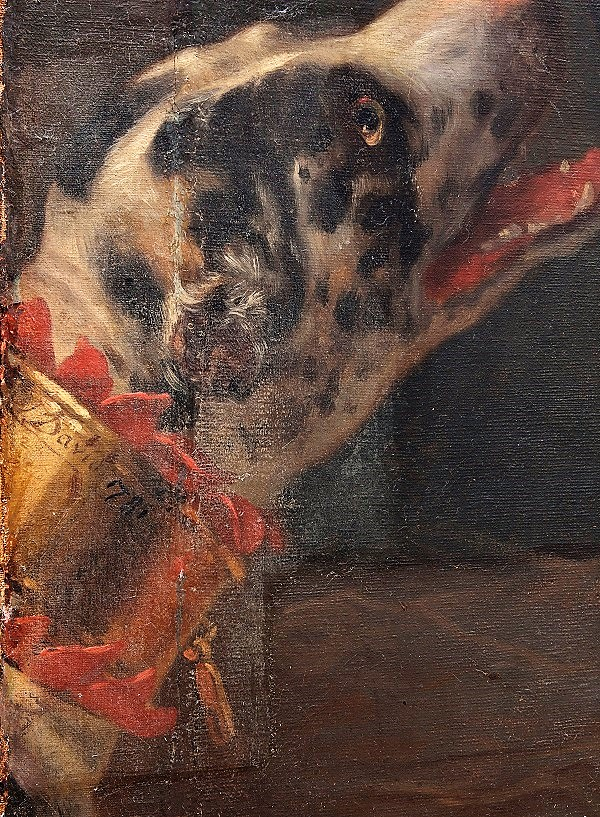
Detail of the 1781 painting by David showing the artist's signature inscribed on the dog's collar

David depicts Potocki on horseback against a grey wall on top of which two classical columns are placed. Art historian Antoine Schnapper notes that the presence of straw beneath the horse's hooves could suggest a stable setting, while the "stately architecture" in the background might hint at an imaginary or idealized backdrop. Potocki is depicted with no coat and only the blue sash of the Polish Order of the White Eagle, the country's highest civilian order, indicates his rank. He is attired in what Palmer characterized as the "finest" clothing: yellow trousers and a white shirt. Potocki is seen removing his hat in a cordial greeting to the viewer, as the horse lowers its head. In the lower left-hand corner, a dog can be observed barking at the horse.

=== Influences and scholarship ===
The portrait has been described as one of David's masterpieces, and marking the return to prominence of equestrian portraiture in European late 18th-century painting. The art historian Lorenz Eitner notes the influence of two 17th-century Flemish Baroque painters, Peter Paul Rubens and Anthony van Dyck, on David's 1781 portrait, and argues that the painting "offers a premonition of the manner in which [David] was later to treat modern, national subjects". According to Antoine Schnapper, the painting recalls van Dyck's 1634 equestrian portrait of Thomas Francis, Prince of Carignano, a sketch of which David had completed prior to painting the Polish nobleman.

Schnapper also concludes that the "horse's forequarters" correspond to a 17th-century tapestry fragment illustrating the story of Publius Decius Mus, a 4th-century BCE Roman consul known for sacrificing himself during the Second Latin War. The tapestry, designed after a composition originally painted by Rubens in 1618, had been copied by David sometime prior to 1780 and later exhibited at the Louvre. The importance of Rubens is also noted by the American art historian Robert Rosenblum who described the horse in Potocki's portrait as a "Rubensian stallion". In examining the formal qualities of the composition, the French scholar of 18th-century art Charlotte Guichard highlights the atypical placement of the artist's signature found on the dog's golden collar in the bottom left corner of the painting. She suggests that by "breaking dynamically into the space of representation, David's glittering name shines forth, catching the light and the viewer's attention".

Scholars have also addressed the political resonance of the painting. According to Palmer, the portrait might symbolize the "prerevolutionary debate" of whether the nobility were "superior merely by blood or also of mind". Analyzing Eastern European representation in the late 18th-century Western art, historian Larry Wolff considers that the motif of horsemanship alluded to the "taming and harnessing" of Eastern Europe more broadly, in common with other works of art from the 1780s. He observes that "the Polish nobleman astride a perfectly poised, intensely muscled horse, head bent in submission beneath a dramatic mane" is depicted with great discipline. Moreover, the French art historian Philippe Bordes positions the painting alongside David's other contemporary portraits of prominent social figures—including the 1788 depiction of the French chemist Antoine-Laurent Lavoisier and his wife Marie-Anne Pierrette Paulze—created by an artist he asserts was "determined to engage his talent to climb the social ladder".

== Reception and ownership ==
=== Paris Salon (1781) ===
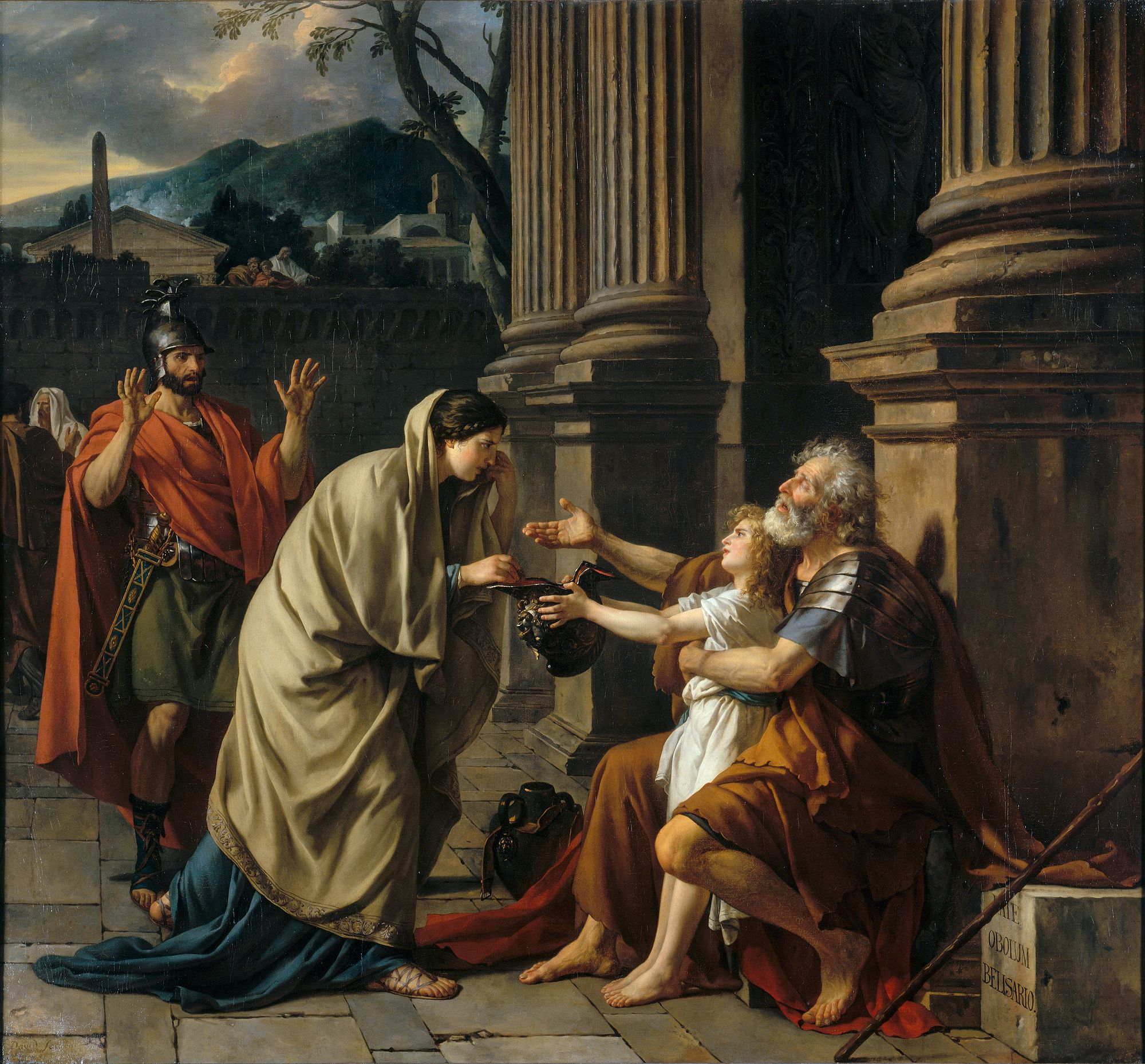
David, Belisarius Begging for Alms, 1781 (Palais des Beaux-Arts, Lille) was exhibited alongside Equestrian Portrait of Count Stanislas Potocki at the Paris Salon in 1781

In his 1930 biographical study of the artist, art historian Richard Cantinelli noted that David began working on the Equestrian Portrait of Count Stanislas Potocki in Rome and departed for Paris on July 17, 1780. In Paris, he finished the painting and displayed it at the 1781 Salon. The exhibition was David's Salon debut and Potocki's portrait was shown alongside Belisarius Begging for Alms, Saint Roch Interceding with the Virgin for the Plague-Stricken, The Funeral Games of Patroclus, and a composition titled A Woman Suckling Her Child, all of which were praised by the French Enlightenment philosopher and prominent writer Denis Diderot. When discussing Potocki's portrait, Diderot singled out David's light color palette, which stood in contrast to history paintings completed by the artist during the same period.

[David] displays the grand manner in everything he does. He has soul, his heads have expression without affectation, his attitudes are noble and natural, he draws, he knows how to arrange drapery and make handsome folds, his color is beautiful (...)

— Denis Diderot, 1781

Although Belisarius Begging for Alms has received the highest amount of praise from contemporary critics, Equestrian Portrait of Count Stanislas Potocki has since been described as one of the paintings that "cemented David's success". David's debut at the 1781 Salon proved to be an important artistic milestone and helped to establish him as "the most promising painter of the rising generation". Following its display in Paris, the portrait was sent to Warsaw, although the precise timeline of its movements remains uncertain. (Note: The first record of the work matching the description of David's portrait of Potocki appears in a register dated 1783–1794 (Cataloges des Tableaux, Estampe Portraits Dessins Statues Bustes ect de la Galleries de Willanow ait l’anne 1725. Chambre qui precede la Gallerie), under number 66 a work titled Portrait d'un homme à cheval gr: nat: Peintres: de David. Another source from 1791 indicates that the work was likely kept in the studio of the Polish painter Franciszek Smuglewicz (1745–1807) at the Royal Castle in Warsaw, where he would later produce his own copy of the composition. In a document dating back to 1798–1799 an "equestrian portrait" was listed as part of the art collection housed within the Potocki Palace, situated on Krakowskie Przedmieście in Warsaw. See detailed discussion of the painting's provenance during that period in Guzowska, Kwiatkowska & Walawender-Musz (2019).) Existing records indicate that it was transferred to Wilanów Palace, a former royal residence near Warsaw owned by Potocki, on December 5, 1801. The Baroque palace and its accompanying gardens, originally built for King John III Sobieski and his wife Marie Casimire Louise de La Grange d'Arquien in 1681–1696, was inherited by Izabela Lubomirska, Potocki's mother-in-law, in 1778.

=== Later years (1781–1939) ===
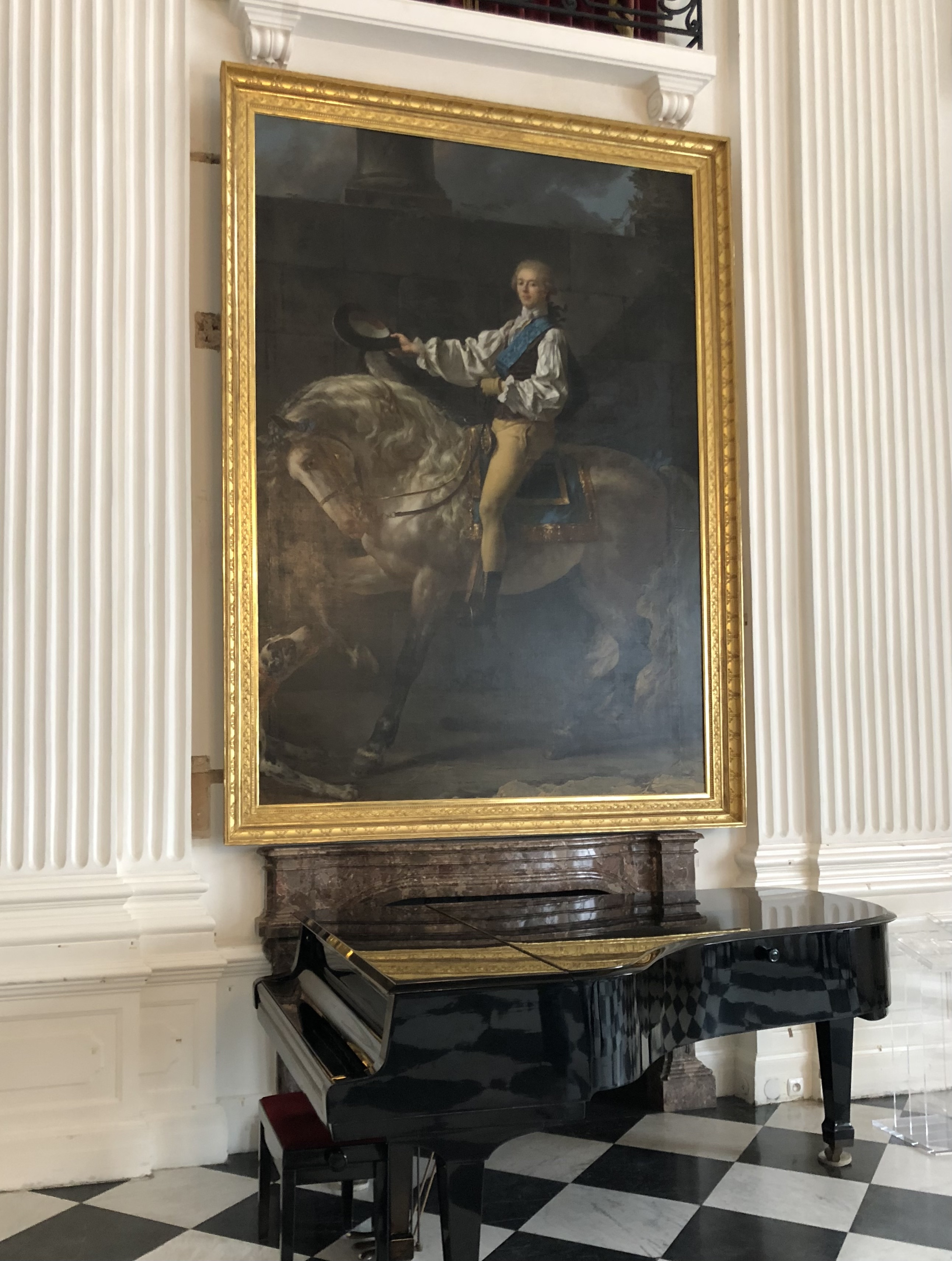
David's Portrait of Count Stanislas Kostka Potocki on display at Wilanów Palace in 2019 following conservation

The ownership of Wilanów was transferred to Potocki in 1799, who would amass a significant collection of European and East Asian art. David's portrait of Potocki was placed on the eastern wall of the Great Hall (now known as the White Hall) of the palace. In 1805, the collection was officially opened to the public, becoming one of the first public art museums in Poland. In 1831, amid concerns of potential Russian pillaging due to the November Uprising—an armed insurrection that had erupted on 29 November 1830 against the occupying Russian Empire—the portrait of Potocki was relocated to Warsaw for safekeeping, where it remained until 1834.

Placed on public display at the palace until 1864, it was then moved to private quarters to become part of the Potocki family portrait collection put together by August Potocki, Stanisław's grandson. In 1877, Aleksandra Potocka, August's widow, published an illustrated catalogue of the Wilanów collection, which included a reproduction of David's portrait of Stanisław Kostka Potocki. The ownership of the palace and the collection was subsequently passed to the Branicki family in 1892. In 1913, it was featured in David's retrospective titled David et ses élèves at the Petit Palais in Paris. In 1932, the portrait, along with several other works by David, was shown at the Exhibition of French Art 1200–1900, an extensive survey show of French art across seven centuries, organized at the Royal Academy of Arts in London. In 1937, it was exhibited at Exposition Internationale des Arts et Techniques dans la Vie Moderne in Paris.

=== World War II and its aftermath ===
In 1944, during World War II, Equestrian Portrait of Count Stanislas Potocki was looted by the Nazi forces. According to surviving records, the painting was stolen by a group led by the Wehrmacht General Eberhard Kinzel in December 1944, who first transported it to Świdnica and then to Germany. During Jacques-Louis David's bi-centenary exhibition in Paris in 1948, art historian Douglas Cooper described the portrait of Potocki as one of the "important works" missing from the show. In 1952, Soviet authorities informed the Polish government (by then the USSR-aligned Polish People's Republic), that they had retrieved numerous works from the Wilanów collection as part of their wider post-war restitution campaign that spanned across Germany. According to Stanisław Lorentz, who was the director of the National Museum in Warsaw at the time, the initial set of works was repatriated to Poland in the same year. The remaining works, which included the portrait by David and Jan Matejko's Stańczyk from 1862, among numerous other paintings and works on paper, were returned during an official ceremony held at the Hermitage Museum in St. Petersburg (then Leningrad) in 1956.

Subsequently, the portrait was placed in the collection of the National Museum in Warsaw. In 1990, after the fall of communism in Poland, the work was transferred back to Wilanów, then part of the National Museum in Warsaw, and placed on public display. In 1995, the palace became an independent national museum and in 2013, it was renamed the Museum of King Jan III's Palace at Wilanów. In 2016, after undergoing extensive conservation, the painting was moved from the North Hall to the White Hall, its original location during the early 1800s where David's painting remains on view as of April 2023.

=== Print reproductions and copies ===
The painting has been often reproduced in print, most famously in the 1880 publication by Jacques-Louis-Jules David, which resulted in renewed interest in David's portrait of Potocki at the end of the 19th century. Moreover, several copies of the painting are said to have been completed over time, including those painted by David himself. Some scholars proposed that the painting originally commissioned by Ferdinand IV could be distinct from another work intended for Potocki, as suggested by the existence of a receipt the artist provided to Potocki on 30 June 1780, and follow-up correspondence between the two dated 10 July 1780.

In an 1877 ledger from Wilanów Palace, Equestrian Portrait of Count Stanislas Potocki is described as "a study by David" made in 1781 which was bought later in Paris by Elżbieta Izabela Lubomirska for her daughter Aleksandra Potocka, prompting some researchers to speculate that the portrait currently in the Wilanów collection might itself be David's copy of the original work. The ledger also makes no mention of the 1781 Paris Salon, where the original painting is believed to have been first exhibited. (Note: This hypothesis is proposed by Guzowska, Kwiatkowska & Walawender-Musz (2019).) Existing records further point to versions of the work made by other artists, including a 1791 copy by the Polish artist Franciszek Smuglewicz, which has since been lost, as well as one made in or around 1905 by the painter Wacław Pawliszak. Assertions about the existence of purported additional copies of the portrait have also emerged in the 21st century, though these claims have not yet been verified by researchers. (Note: As of 2019, three additional existing copies by unknown David followers, including one sold in 2015 at the auction house Drouot, Paris, have been traced by researchers. Guzowska, Kwiatkowska & Walawender-Musz (2019).)

== Gallery ==
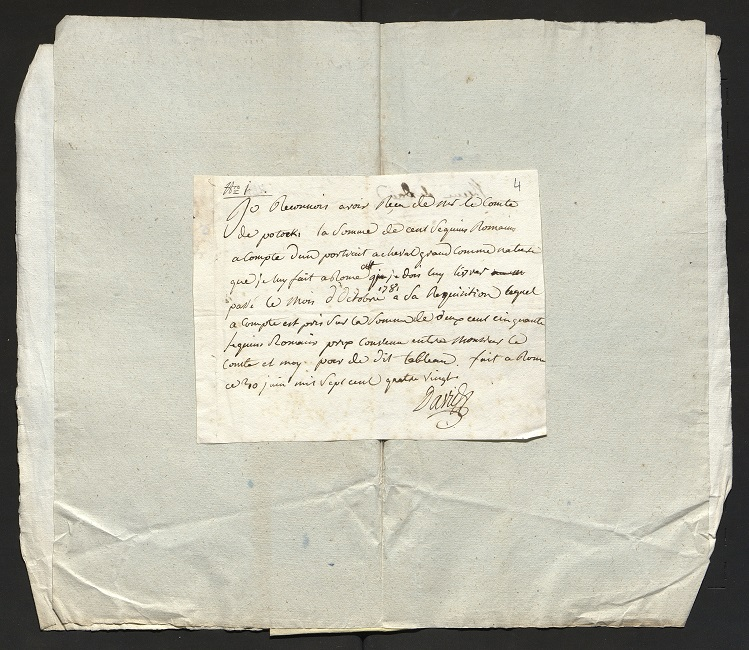
Receipt issued by David to Potocki for the sale of an artwork in Rome in 1780

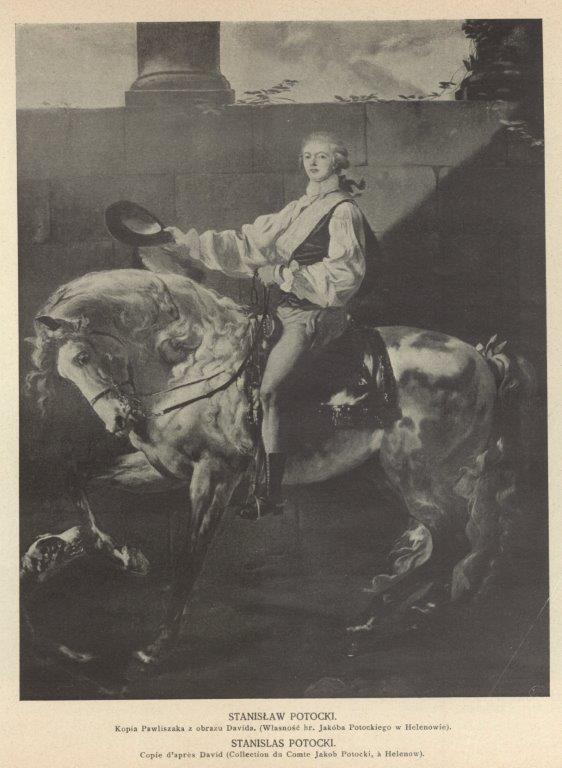
Reproduction of a copy of David's portrait made by Pawliszak in or around 1905

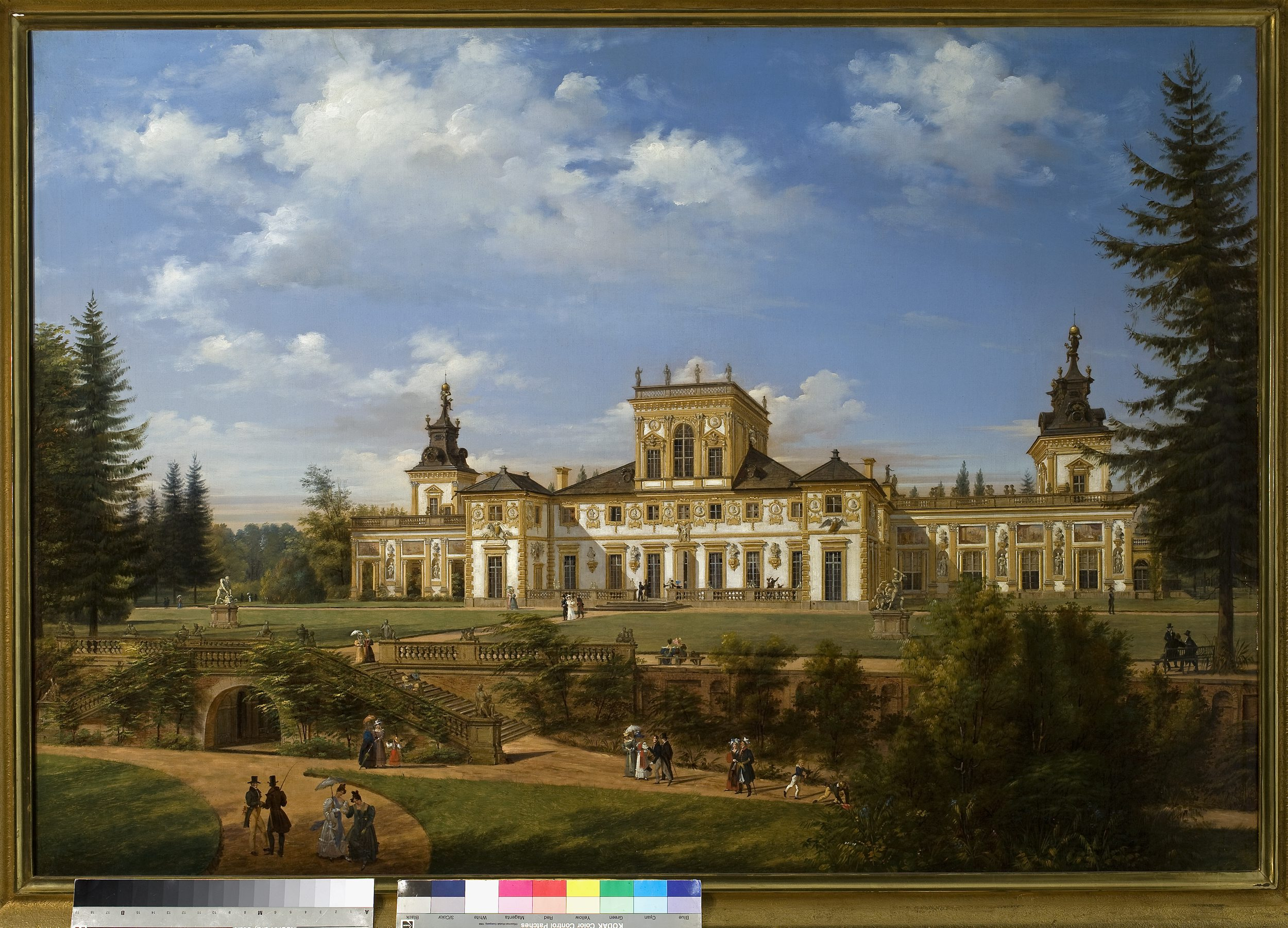
Wincenty Kasprzycki's View of the Palace from the Park, held in the National Museum in Warsaw, shows the wing of the palace in which David's painting was shown before 1834.

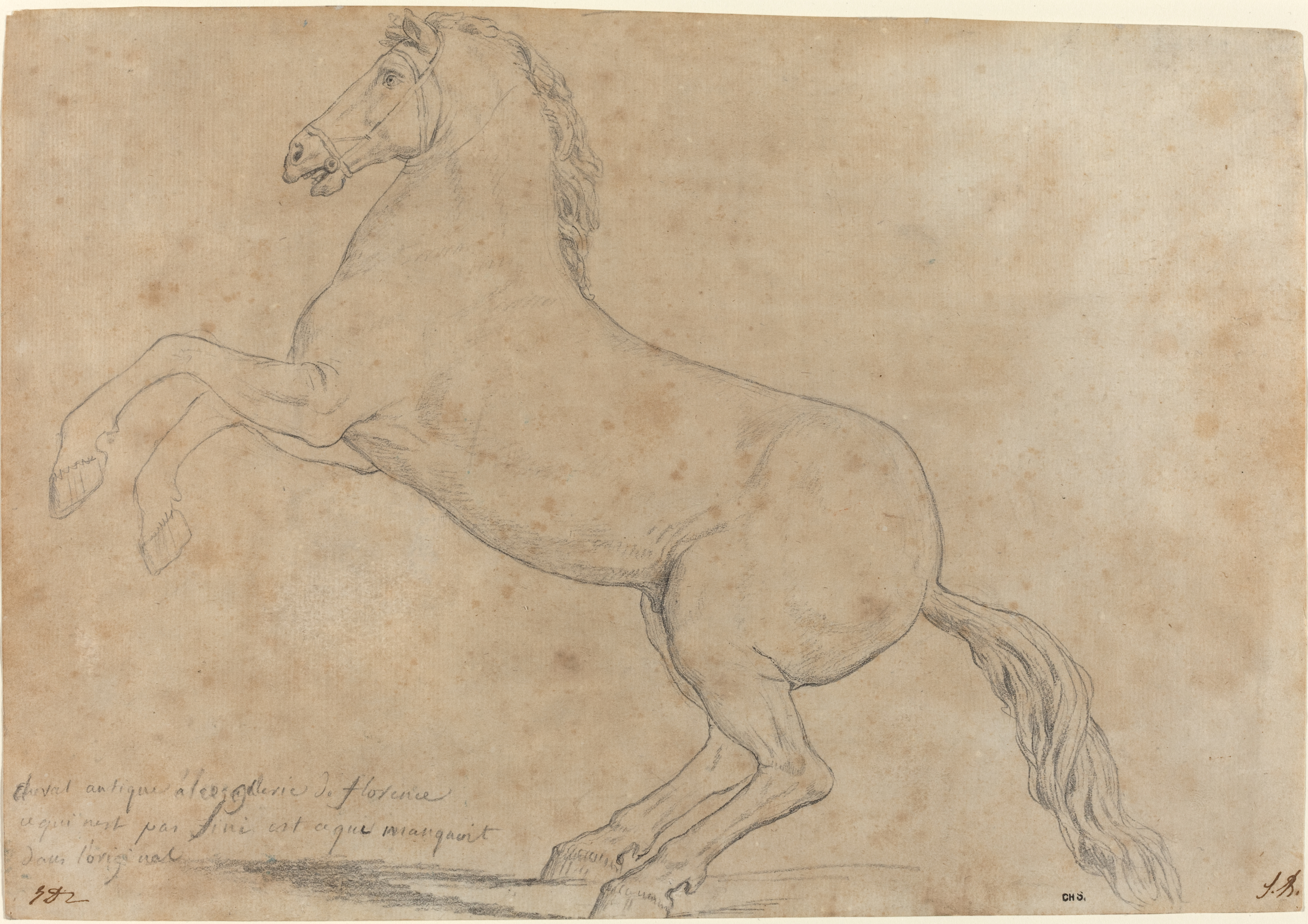
Jacques-Louis David, An Antique Sculpture of a Horse, 1780, graphite laid on paper (National Gallery of Art)

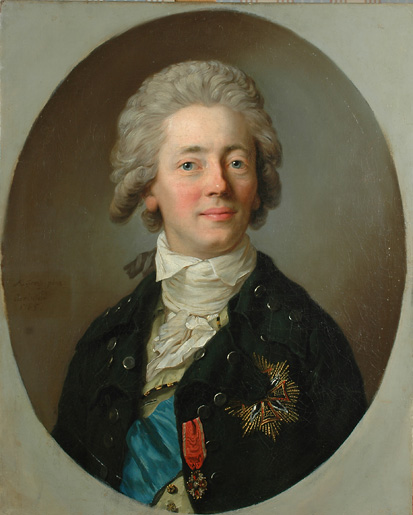
Anton Graff, Stanisław Kostka Potocki, 1785 (Wilanów Palace Museum)

== See also ==
- Academic art
- History of Poland
- History of Warsaw
- List of paintings by Jacques-Louis David
- Partitions of Poland
- Russian Empire
- Szlachta

== Sources ==
- Badea-Päun, Gabriel (2007). The Society Portrait: Painting, Prestige and the Pursuit of Elegance. London: Thames & Hudson. ISBN 978-0-500-23842-4. OCLC 185155882.
- Behrens, Edward (3 January 2023). "Rubens and an outstanding display of Roman virtue". Apollo Magazine.
- Bordes, Philippe (2005). Jacques-Louis David: Empire to Exile. New Haven, Connecticut: Yale University Press. ISBN 0-300-10447-2.
- Bordes, Philippe (2022). Jacques-Louis David: Radical Draftsman. New York: Metropolitan Museum of Art.
- Cantinelli, Richard R. (1930). Jacques-Louis David, 1748–1825 (in French). Paris: G. van Oest.
- Cooper, Douglas (October 1948). "Jacques-Louis David: A Bi-Centenary Exhibition". The Burlington Magazine. 90 (547): 276–280. JSTOR 869835.
- Crow, Thomas E. (1985). Painters and Public Life in Eighteenth-Century Paris. New Haven: Yale University Press. ISBN 0-300-03354-0.
- Cydzik, Jacek; Fijałkowski, Wojciech; Kupiecki, Edmund (1975). Wilanów. Warsaw: Arkady.
- David, Jacques-Louis-Jules (1880). Le peintre Louis David 1748–1825. Souvenirs et documents inédits (in French). Paris.
- Du Prey, Pierre de la Ruffinière (1994). The Villas of Pliny from Antiquity to Posterity. Chicago: University of Chicago Press. ISBN 0-226-17300-3.
- Eitner, Lorenz (2000). "Jacques-Louis David". French Paintings of the Nineteenth Century, Part I: Before Impressionism (PDF). Vol. 1. Washington, D.C.: The Collections of the National Gallery of Art Systematic Catalogue. pp. 193–196. ISBN 0-89468-227-X.
- Eitner, Lorenz (2021). An Outline of 19th-Century European Painting from David through Cézanne. New York: Routledge. ISBN 978-0-429-70891-6.
- Fijałkowski, Wojciech (1983). Wilanów. Rezydencja Króla Zwycięzcy [Wilanów. The residence of the Victorious King] (in Polish). Warsaw: Krajowa Agencja Wydawnicza.
- Fried, Michael (1988). Absorption and Theatricality: Painting and Beholder in the Age of Diderot (English translation after Fried). Chicago: University of Chicago Press. ISBN 0-226-26213-8.
- Galitz, Kathryn Calley (October 2004). "The Legacy of Jacques Louis David (1748–1825)". Heilbrunn Timeline of Art History. New York: The Metropolitan Museum of Art.
- Getka-Kenig, Mikołaj (2021). Stanisław Kostka Potocki: studium magnackiej kariery w dobie upadku i "wskrzeszenia" Polski (in Polish). Warszawa: Muzeum Pałacu Króla Jana III w Wilanowie. ISBN 978-83-66104-75-4.
- Gontar, Cybele (October 2003). "Neoclassicism". Heilbrunn Timeline of Art History. New York: The Metropolitan Museum of Art.
- Gronkowski, Camille (1913). "'David et ses Eleves' at the Petit Palais". The Burlington Magazine. 23.
- Guichard, Charlotte (April 2018). "Signatures, Authorship and Autographie in Eighteenth-Century French Painting". Art History. 41 (2). doi:10.1111/1467-8365.12328. ISSN 0141-6790.
- Guile, Carolyn C. (December 2013). "Winckelmann in Poland: An Eighteenth-Century Response to the 'History of the Art of Antiquity'". Journal of Art Historiography (9). University of Birmingham: 1–24.
- Guzowska, Anna; Kwiatkowska, Anna; Walawender-Musz, Dominika (15 October 2019). "Portret konny Stanisława Kostki Potockiego J.-L. Davida w świetle nowych badań konserwatorskich i archiwalnych" [Equestrian Portrait of Stanisław Kostka Potocki J.-L. David in Light of New Conservation and Archival Research]. Muzeum Pałacu Króla Jana III w Wilanowie (in Polish). Archived from the original on 28 May 2023.
- Jarocki, Robert (1981). Rozmowy z Lorentzem (in Polish). Warsaw: Państwowy Instytut Wydawniczy. ISBN 83-06-00572-4.
- Johns, Christopher M. S. (2006). "The Roman Experience of Jacques-Louis David, 1775–80". In Johnson, Dorothy (ed.). Jacques-Louis David: New Perspectives. Newark, Delaware: University of Delaware Press. ISBN 0-87413-930-9.
- Kaczmarzyk, Dariusz (1976). "Pamiętnik wystawy 'Warszawa oskarża': 3 maja 1945 – 28 stycznia 1946 w Muzeum Narodowym w Warszawie". Rocznik Muzeum Narodowego w Warszawie (in Polish) (20). National Museum in Warsaw. doi:10.11588/diglit.19582.17.
- Kangaslahti, Kate (12 December 2016). "Painting the National Portrait: Retrospective Exhibitions of French and Italian Art in the 1930's". Il Capitale Culturale. Studies on the Value of Cultural Heritage. 14. Macerata: University of Macerata.
- Kuc, Monika (7 August 2016). "Portret Stanisława Kostki Potockiego wrócił do Wilanowa" [The portrait of Stanisław Kostka Potocki returned to Wilanów]. Rzeczpospolita (in Polish).
- Kudelski, Jarosław Robert (7 August 2019). "Wilanów works of art in the German Catalogue Sichergestellte Kunstwerke im Generalgouvernement". Muzealnictwo. 60 (60): 189–198. doi:10.5604/01.3001.0013.3341 (inactive 12 July 2025). ISSN 2391-4815. Archived from the original on 5 September 2024.
- Levey, Michael (1993). Painting and Sculpture in France, 1700–1789. New Haven: Yale University Press. ISBN 0-300-05344-4. OCLC 26586498.
- Palmer, Allison Lee (2020). Historical Dictionary of Neoclassical Art and Architecture. Lanham, Maryland: Rowman & Littlefield Publishers. ISBN 978-1-5381-3359-0.
- Paprocka-Gajek, Joanna; Kwiatkowska, Anna (2021). "Dorobek i perspektywy badań nad życiem i działalnością Stanisława Kostki Potockiego prowadzonych w Muzeum Pałacu Króla Jana III w Wilanowie. W dwusetną rocznicę śmierci" [Achievements and Prospects in Studies on the Life and Actions of Stanisław Kostka Potocki Carried Out at the Museum of King Jan III's Palace at Wilanów on the 200th Anniversary of Potocki's Death]. Studia Wilanowskie (in Polish and English). 28: 21–39. doi:10.36135/MPKJIII.01377329.2021.SWXXVIII.pp.21-39. ISSN 0137-7329.
- Poprzęcka, Maria (2005). "Niezwyczajny portret" [Extraordinary portrait]. Mówią wieki (in Polish) (8). ISSN 1230-4018.
- "Potocki Stanisław Kostka". Encyklopedia PWN (in Polish). Warsaw: Polskie Wydawnictwo Naukowe.
- Rosenblum, Robert (1973). "David's 'Funeral of Patroclus'". The Burlington Magazine. 115 (846): 567–577. ISSN 0007-6287.
- Ryszkiewicz, Andrzej (1964). "Jacques Louis David i Polacy". Rocznik Historii Sztuki (in Polish). 4. Warsaw: Polish Academy of Sciences.
- Sandström, Birgitta (1988). "An Equestrian Portrait of the Duc d'Orléans by Alexander Roslin". Bulletin of the Detroit Institute of Arts. 64 (1). doi:10.1086/DIA41504785. ISSN 0011-9636. S2CID 192745494.
- Schnapper, Antoine (1975). "Portrait of Count Stanislas Potocki". In Cummings, Frederick J.; Rosenberg, Pierre; Rosenblum, Robert (eds.). French Painting 1774–1830: The Age of Revolution (exh. cat.). New York and Detroit: The Metropolitan Museum of Art, Detroit Institute of Arts. pp. 363–364.
- Schnapper, Antoine (1982). David. New York: Alpine Fine Arts Collection. ISBN 0-933516-59-2.
- Wita, Ignacy (10 July 1956). "Dzieła uratowane z wojennej pożogi". Życie Warszawy (in Polish).
- Wolff, Larry (1994). Inventing Eastern Europe: The Map of Civilization on the Mind of the Enlightenment. Stanford, California: Stanford University Press. ISBN 0-8047-2314-1.
