= Go (artwork) =

Oil painting and stained-glass installation by Kehinde Wiley

- Artist: Kehinde Wiley
- Year: 2020
- Medium: Stained glass with aluminum frame, gypsum molding, steel structure, and LED light panel
- Dimensions: 17'6" long × 55'8" wide × 10" deep
- Condition: extant
- Location: 33rd Street entrance of Moynihan Train Hall at Pennsylvania Station; New York City, U.S.

Go is the title of a pair of artworks by the American artist Kehinde Wiley. Both pieces depict young black people set against blue skies. The first piece, a series of oil paintings executed in 2003, are in the collection of the Brooklyn Museum; the second is a stained-glass triptych designed for the ceiling of the Moynihan Train Hall at Pennsylvania Station in Midtown Manhattan, New York City.

== Go painting series ==
The Go series of five panels painted in oil is in the collection of the Brooklyn Museum in New York City. Each panel measures 48 × 120 × 2 1/2 in. (121.9 × 304.8 × 6.4 cm). The panels are numbered a-e. The series has been exhibited on the ceiling of the museum.

== Go stained glass triptych ==
The Go triptych in stained glass one of three permanent artworks specifically designed for installation at the expanded Moynihan Train Hall at Pennsylvania Station in Midtown Manhattan, New York City. It was commissioned by the Empire State Development Corporation in partnership with the Public Art Fund of New York. It was unveiled in December 2020. It is situated across the ceiling of the 33rd Street Midblock Entrance Hall of the station. The metal molding that surrounds the panels is intended to complement the metal frames of the exterior windows of the train hall. The work is hand painted on Czech glass and lit from behind. It depicts break dancers set against a blue sky. The subjects of the piece wear contemporary clothing including "baggy yellow pants and a crop top" and a denim jacket. Wiley's use of foreshortening in the piece is in homage to the 18th century artist Giovanni Battista Tiepolo who was noted for his frescoed ceilings. Due to time constraints Wiley used subjects of his previous works as models for the piece instead of his usual practice of selecting strangers from the street.

Wiley stated that he wished to "play with the language of ceiling frescoes" finding that in ceiling frescoes "people [express] a type of levity and religious devotion and ascendancy" and that the movement in such frescos is reminiscent of breakdancing. Breakdancing originated in New York City and Wiley wanted to express "this idea of expressing absolute joy — break dancing in the sky". Wiley declared that the "aesthetic of Black culture is the aesthetic of survival, of buoyancy and saliency and the ability to float in the midst of so much". Wiley said that he hoped that people recognised themselves in the piece as he wished to create "at the intersection of trade, commerce and transportation in the capital of the world's economy, something that sits as a testament to Black possibility". The Public Art Fund described the piece as "[celebrating] the vibrancy and virtuosity of bodies in motion at monumental scale" and the figures as "contemporary avatars of the sublime".

Writing in The New York Times, Dionne Searcey felt the "outstretched finger" of a woman wearing camouflage was reminiscent of The Creation of Adam in Michelangelo's fresco for the Sistine Chapel ceiling. Searcey felt that "Instead of angels and gods in classical frescoes, Mr. Wiley offers Nike logos and pigeons in midflight".
