= Equestrian Portrait of Thomas Francis, Prince of Carignano =

1634 painting by Anthony van Dyck

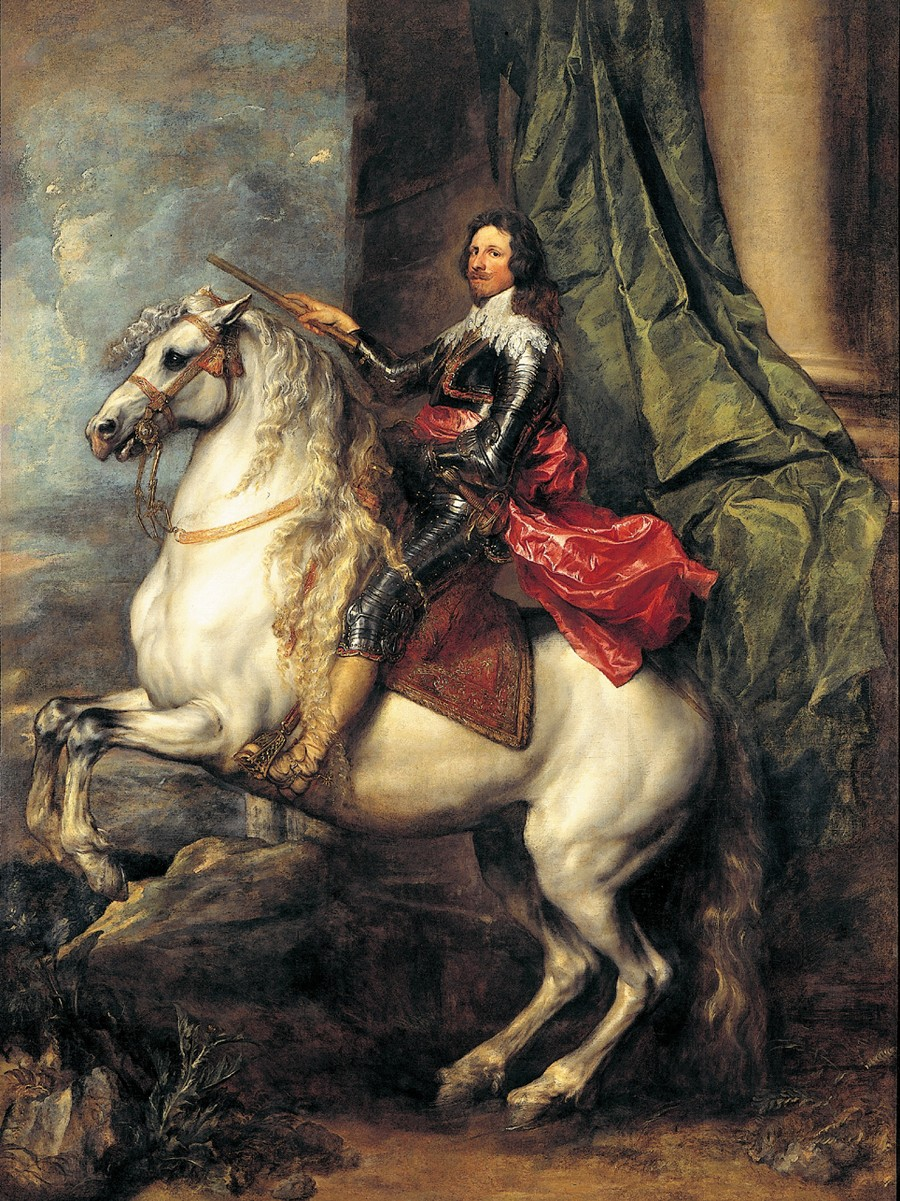

Equestrian Portrait of Thomas Francis, Prince of Carignano is a 1634 painting by Anthony van Dyck, now in the Galleria Sabauda in Turin. It shows Thomas Francis, Prince of Carignano on a prancing horse, as an allegory of his holding the reins of command even in difficult moments. He is shown wearing the insignia and red sash of the Supreme Order of the Most Holy Annunciation, conferred on him in 1616 by his father Charles Emmanuel I, Duke of Savoy. In 1742 the work was sold to the King of Sardinia.

== See also ==
- List of paintings by Anthony van Dyck
