= Portrait of Adele Bloch-Bauer =

Portrait of Adele Bloch-Bauer can refer to two paintings of Adele Bloch-Bauer by Gustav Klimt.

- Portrait of Adele Bloch-Bauer I, painted 1903–1907, oil and gold leaf on canvas
- Portrait of Adele Bloch-Bauer II, painted 1912, oil on canvas
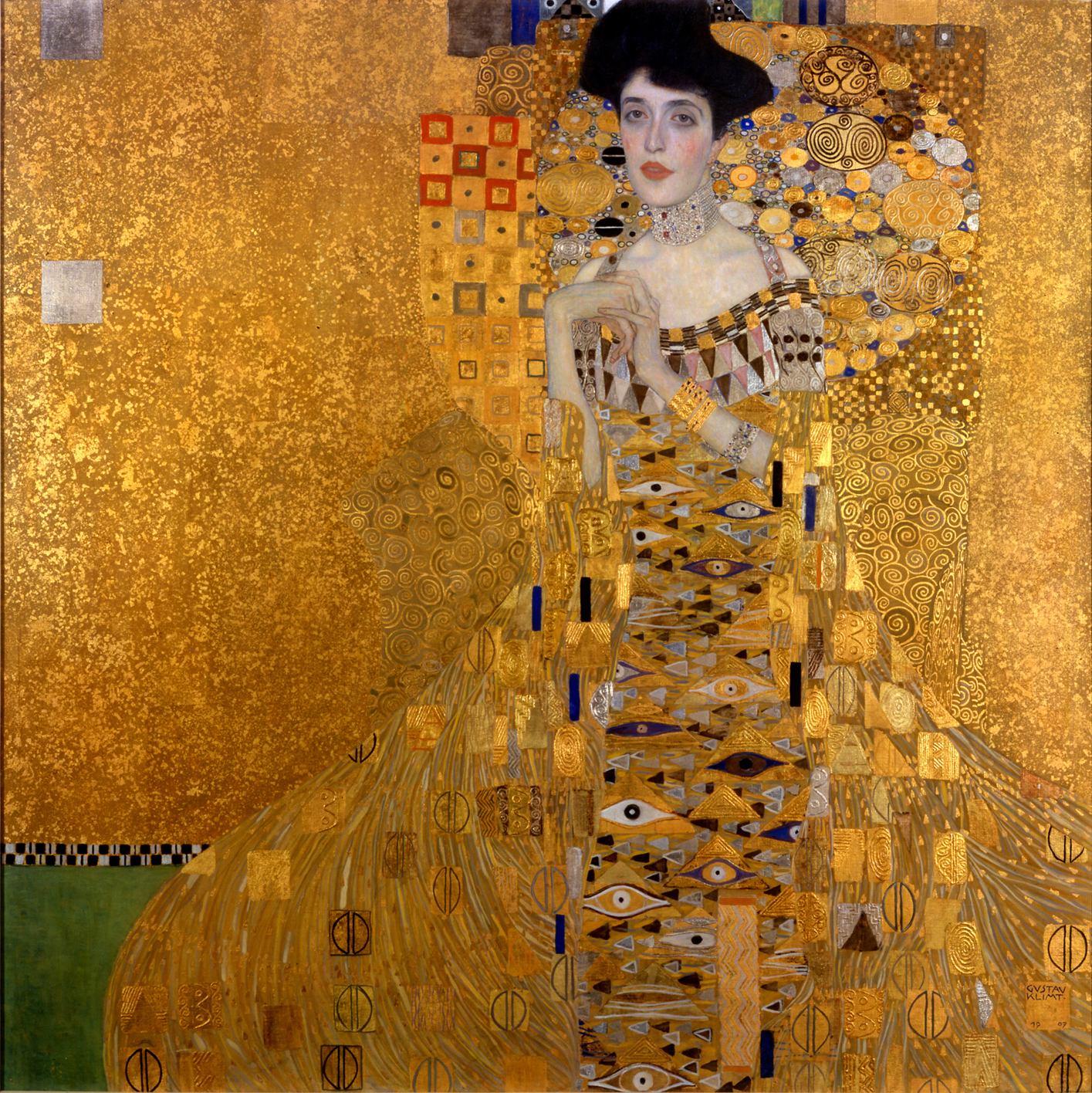
Portrait of Adele Bloch-Bauer I

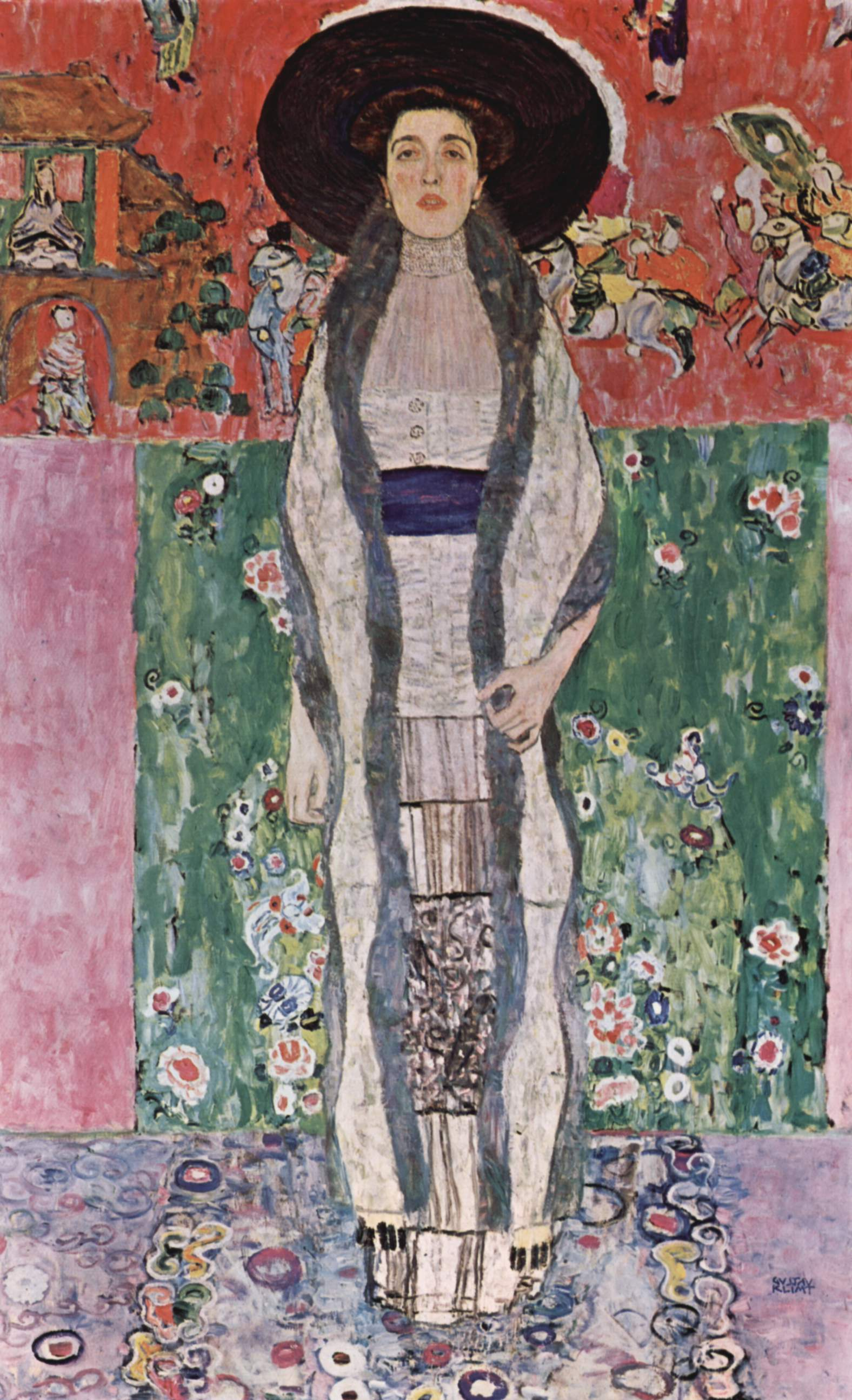
Portrait of Adele Bloch-Bauer II
