= Stephen Lash =

- Born: 10 February 1940 (age 86); Boston, Massachusetts
- Education: Yale University, Columbia Business School
- Occupations: Chairman Emeritus, Christie's New York
- Spouse: Wendy Lehman Lash
- Children: William Lash
- Website: https://www.christies.com/en

Stephen Lash (born February 10, 1940) is founder of Christie's North America and the Chairman Emeritus of Christie's New York.

== Biography ==
He attended Avon Old Farms boarding school for boys.

He was a trustee to the New York City Landmarks Preservation Commission. He also served as a Trustee of the Preservation League of New York State.

== Christie's North America ==
Christie's hired Lash in 1976. For over ten years, Lash was the chairman of Christie's Americas. In 1984, Lash became the vice president in the estates and appraisals department.

== Historic sale of Klimts ==
Under Lash's direction in 2006, the collection of Adele Bloch-Bauer niece Maria Altmann, which included four paintings by Gustav Klimt returned to Altmann after a decade-long legal battle, sold at Christie's. The paintings were Adele Bloch-Bauer II, Apple Tree I, Birch Trees, and Houses at Attersee. A fifth and final Klimt, Adele Bloch-Bauer I, sold in a private sale to billionaire Ronald Lauder in 2006 for $135 million.

== Past and current boards ==
Lash has served on various boards for several organizations, some being:

- Peabody Essex Museum (co-chair)
- Ocean Liner Museum (founder)
- Museum of the City of New York (board member)
- New York Landmarks Conservancy (board member)
- American Friends of the Israel Museum (co-chair)
- New York University Institute of Fine Arts (president)
