= Peter Bentley (businessman) =

Canadian businessman (1930–2021)

- Born: 1930; Vienna, Austria
- Died: 6 September 2021 (aged 90–91)
- Occupation: Businessman
- Known for: CEO of Canfor Corporation
- Parent(s): Leopold Bloch-Bauer, aka Poldi; Antoinette Ruth Pick
- Awards: Order of Canada

Peter John Gerald Bentley, OC (1930 – 6 September 2021) was a Canadian businessman and the third Chancellor of the University of Northern British Columbia.

== Early life and education ==
Bentley was born in Vienna, Austria to a Jewish family, the son of Leopold Lionel Bloch-Bauer and Antoinette Ruth Pick. His aunt was Maria Altmann, and his great-aunt was Adele Bloch-Bauer, of the Portrait of Adele Bloch-Bauer I. His family fled Vienna in 1938 after unsuccessfully trying to prevent the nationalization by the Nazis of the family business, one of the largest sugar mills in Austria which supplied twenty percent of the country's sugar. The facility was later sold to a Nazi sympathizer for a nominal cost. They moved to British Columbia where his father, who changed his name to Leopold "Poldi" Bentley, founded a furniture and paneling veneer company called Pacific Veneer with his brother-in-law John Prentice (of the Pick family) that later became Canfor Corporation, an integrated forest products company. Canfor went public in 1983 on the Toronto Stock Exchange. Bentley died peacefully in his sleep on 6 September 2021 at the age of 91.

== Career ==
In 1970, Bentley became executive vice-president of Canfor Corporation and president in 1975. In 1985, he became chairman and CEO, a position he held until 1995. From July 1997 to January 1998, he was again president and CEO. He stepped down as chairman of the board in 2009. He was a director and an honorary director of the Bank of Montreal, a member of the Canadian Council of Chief Executives, and a member of the board of directors of the Vancouver General Hospital & University of British Columbia Hospital Foundation.

He has also served in numerous other volunteer positions, including the BC Sports Hall of Fame, the Vancouver Police Foundation, Canadian Golf Association, two independent school boards, and UBC advisory boards. In 2004, he was appointed chancellor of the University of Northern British Columbia and held that post until mid 2007.

He was also the chair of FORED BC Society, a federally registered charity in British Columbia created in 1925, that offers balanced education about forestry and natural resources.

== Recognition ==
In 1983, he was made an officer of the Order of Canada for playing "an important role in manufacturing, business and finance in British Columbia."

== Personal life ==
In 2005, his family was awarded a portion of US$21.8-million in restitution payments for the theft of the family's sugar refinery in Austria by the Nazis.
