= Hubertus Czernin =

Austrian journalist (1956–2006)

- Born: Hubertus Alexander Felix Franz Maria Czernin von und zu Chudenitz; 17 January 1956; Vienna, Austria
- Died: 10 June 2006 (aged 50); Vienna, Austria
- Occupation: Investigative journalist
- Spouses: Cristina Teresa Countess Szapáry de Muraszombath Széchysziget et Szapár (1979–1981); Valerie Countess von Baratta-Dragona (1984)
- Children: 3

Hubertus Czernin (born Hubertus Alexander Felix Franz Maria Czernin von und zu Chudenitz; 17 January 1956 – 10 June 2006) was an Austrian investigative journalist.

From the mid-1980s to his untimely death in 2006, he was one of the most important journalists in the German-speaking world and a key figure in Austria. He is most known in Austria for helping to expose the child sex abuse scandal of Archbishop of Vienna Groer as well as the Nazi past of former United Nations Secretary-General and Austrian President Kurt Waldheim, and is most known in the United States for being instrumental in the eventual restitution of Gustav Klimt's Portrait of Adele Bloch-Bauer I – as depicted in the movie Woman in Gold – to its rightful Jewish heirs.

== Early life ==
Czernin was born in Vienna on 17 January 1956 to Felix Theobald Paul Anton Maria Reichsgraf Czernin von und zu Chudenitz (1902–1968) and his wife Franziska née Baronin von Mayer-Gunthof (1926–1987).

== Career ==
Czernin initially wrote for the news weekly Wochenpresse. In 1984 he was hired by the Viennese magazine Profil, eventually becoming its editor.

Czernin's investigation of Cardinal Hans Hermann Groër revealed that Groër had had sex with over 2,000 young men, starting in the 1950s and ending in the 1990s.

== Restitution of the Klimts ==
In 1998, Czernin was the first journalist to gain access to records at the Austrian Gallery in Vienna. Soon after he published a series of articles about the "suspicious" ownership of five famous paintings from artist Gustav Klimt, proving that claims by Austria that they had been donated to the gallery by Adele Bloch-Bauer were misleading. Adele had, in fact, requested in her will that the paintings be donated to the Österreichische Galerie Belvedere in Vienna upon her death, but in his plumbing of the archives, Czernin discovered the will of her husband Ferdinand Bloch-Bauer, who died 20 years after Adele and was the person who paid for the paintings, leaving all his estate to 2 nieces and 1 neffew."

Czernin's bombshell articles did two things: First, the Vienna archives, which were only open to certain officials before 1998, were now open to the general public. Second, they led to the passage of Austria's "Art Restitution Law", which allowed the family of Maria Altmann, the niece of Ferdinand Bloch-Bauer, along with Altmann's lawyer E. Randol Schoenberg, to pursue claims successfully for the Klimt paintings that had been looted during World War II (see Republic of Austria v. Altmann). In 2004 a United States Supreme Court ruling allowed Altmann to sue the Austrian government for ownership of the multimillion dollar Klimt paintings in the United States, and in 2006 Altmann successfully restituted the paintings. Hundreds of families had looted art restored to them, or restitution made, under the new law.

In 2006, just weeks before his death, Czernin was able to see the Klimt paintings debut for the first time on American soil at an exhibition at LACMA.

== Personal life ==
Czernin was married twice, first to Cristina Teresa Countess Szapáry de Muraszombath Széchysziget et Szapár in 1979 (first cousin to Cristina von Reibnitz, Princess Michael of Kent), ending in divorce in 1981. By his second marriage, to Valerie Countess von Baratta-Dragona, in 1984, he became the father of three daughters.

He died in Vienna of mastocytosis at the age of 50.

Czernin was portrayed by actor Daniel Brühl in the 2015 film Woman in Gold.

== Works ==
- Hubertus Czernin. Die Fälschung: Der Fall Bloch-Bauer und das Werk Gustav Klimts. Czernin Verlag, Vienna 2006. ISBN 3-7076-0000-9

== See also ==
- The Holocaust in Austria
- List of claims for restitution for Nazi-looted art
- Kurt Waldheim
