= Bernhard Altmann =

Austro-Hungarian socialite

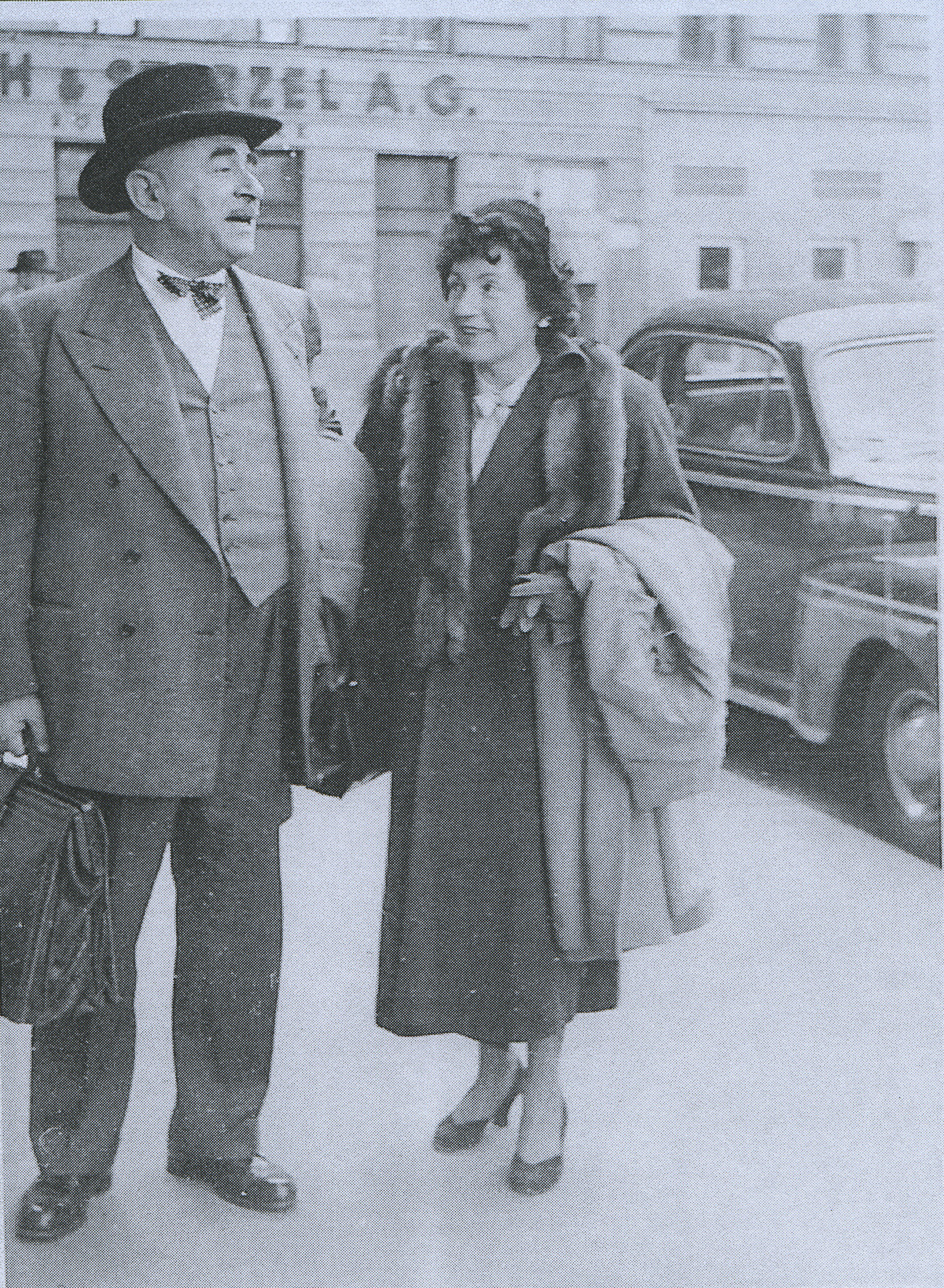
- Bernhard with wife Wilhelmine, Vienna, 1949
- Born: Bernhard Altmann; 23 December 1888; Przemyśl
- Died: 2 December 1960 (aged 71)
- Occupation: Textile manufacturer
- Relatives: Fritz Altmann (brother) Maria Altmann (sister-in-law)

Bernhard Altmann (23 December 1888 – 2 December 1960) was an Austrian textile manufacturer whose business was stolen and whose family's art collection was looted by Nazis because of their Jewish origins. He introduced cashmere wool to North America on a mass scale in 1947.

== Early life ==
Altmann was the son of Karoline Keile (Tischler) and Karl Chaskel Altmann. His family was Jewish. He entered the textile trade in Vienna in 1915, and in 1919 founded his knitwear manufacturing business. His company grew to employ 1,000 people by 1938 before the German Anschluss forced him to flee to London.

== Nazi persecution and exile ==
When Austria joined Hitler's Third Reich in 1938, Altman's textile plant and properties in Vienna were confiscated by the Nazis. His brother Fritz Altmann – husband of Jewish refugee Maria Altmann, who made her living in America after the war selling Bernhard's cashmere sweaters – was taken prisoner by the Nazis and Bernhard was forced to sign over the business in return for Fritz's release from Dachau Concentration Camp.

Altmann started a factory in Liverpool in 1938, where he hired his little brother Fritz - the husband of Maria Altmann - for $30 a week. But despite the promising beginnings he had to abandon it in 1939 as a result of The Blitz and the UK Enemy alien Act of 1939, in which all nationals of enemy countries had to withdraw from coastline cities in three days after the declaration of war. After Liverpool he immigrated to the United States, where he started a company in Fall River, Massachusetts. After two years he lost control of his assets. In 1941 Altmann moved to New York City, where he took a job at a yarn manufacturer for $50 a week.

In 1942, still in New York, Altmann focused again on what he had perfected in Vienna before being forced out by the Nazis: cashmere, as well as a new pattern he had been working on called argyle, neither of which the United States had seen on a mass scale. He put the two materials in a package and mailed it to his sister-in-law Maria, now living in Los Angeles with her husband Fritz. A note was enclosed that read: "See what you can do with these."

In the fall of 1944 Maria took the cashmere and argyle to Kerr's Department Store in Beverly Hills, showed them to the buyer, and, as Maria recounts in The Accidental Caregiver, "He said five words any salesman would dream of hearing: 'How many may we buy?'"

== Postwar life in the US ==
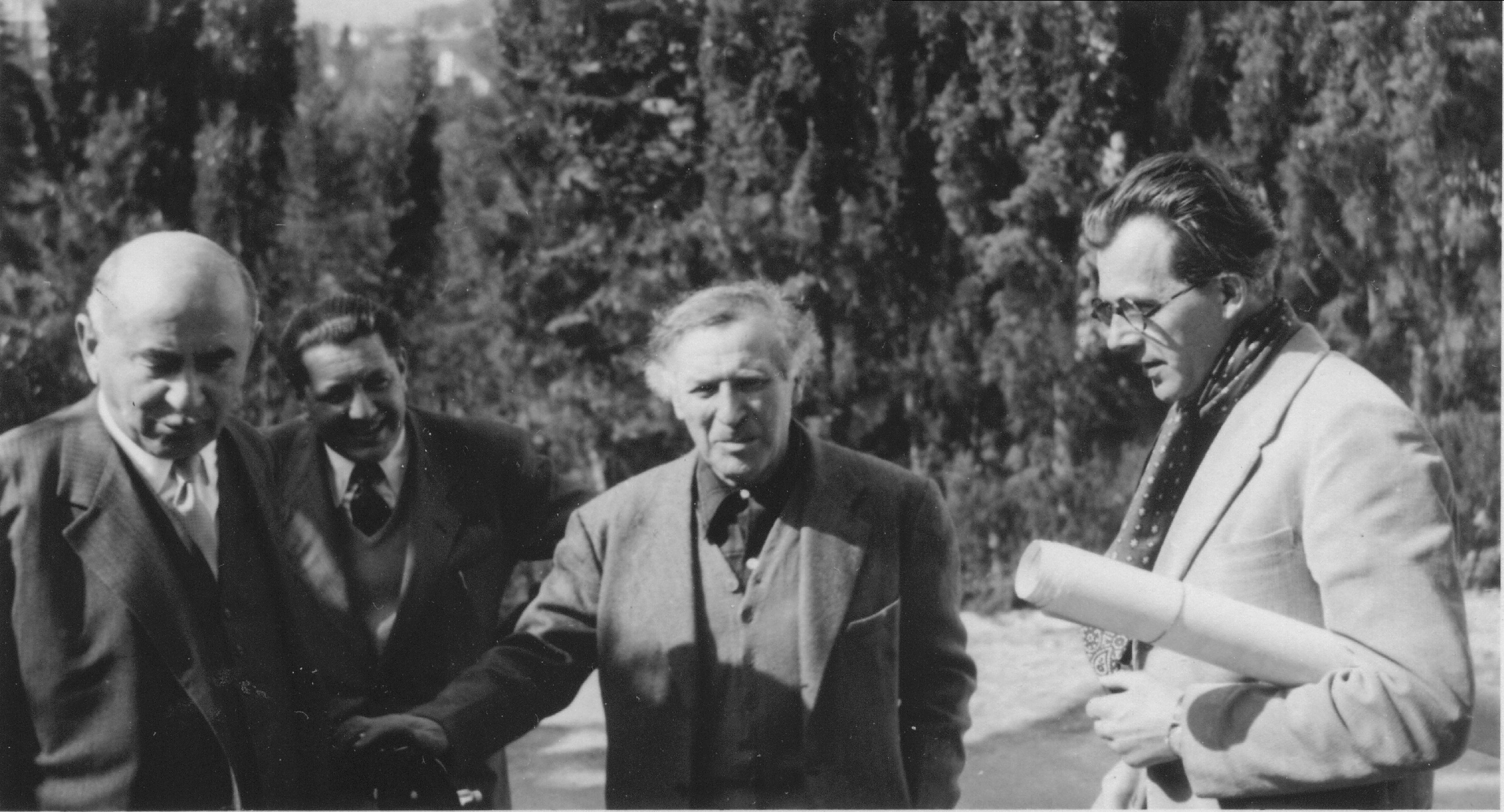
Altmann visiting Marc Chagall in Venice (1952): l.t.r.: Bernhard Altmann, Walter Reimann (driver of Bernhard Altmann), Marc Chagall, Hans Robert Pippal

With Maria and Fritz as the primary "boots on the ground" in California, the cashmere business started in North America in 1947; Bernhard subsequently opened a factory in Texas. By 1951 it was reported that one in every three cashmere sweaters sold in America came from Altmann's Texas mill.

Altmann also produced clothes in Shetland wool, vicuña and a lambswool/fur fibre blend called "Bernamere". A 1960s advertising tagline for the company ran: "The Legend of a Great Knitter."

== Nazi-looted art ==
Altmann is the brother-in-law of Maria Altmann, whose restitution claim for artworks looted by the Nazis went to the Supreme Court and was the subject of the film Woman in Gold starring Helen Mirren, and the father-in-law of painter and fashion designer Ruth Rogers-Altmann.

Artworks seized from Bernhard Altmann by the Gestapo in 1938, were sold via the Dorotheum auction house and ended up in Österreichische Galerie Belvedere, Vienna. Some artworks, like Klimt's "Portrait of a Lady" were restituted in 2004.

== See also ==
- Aryanization
- The Holocaust in Austria
- Vugesta
- Maria Altman
- List of claims for restitution for Nazi-looted art
