= Ferdinand Bloch-Bauer =

Austrian banker (1864–1945)

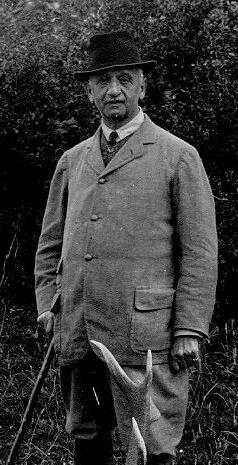
- Ferdinand Bloch-Bauer c. 1935
- Born: Ferdinand Bloch; 16 July 1864; Prague, Bohemia, Austrian Empire
- Died: 13 November 1945 (aged 81); Zurich, Switzerland
- Occupations: Banker, sugar industrialist
- Spouse: Adele Bloch-Bauer (m. 1899–1925)
- Relatives: Maria Altmann (niece)

Ferdinand Bloch-Bauer (16 July 1864 – 13 November 1945) was an Austrian banker and sugar business magnate who owned one of the most extensive art collections in Europe, most of which was looted by the Nazis during the Anschluss. Husband of salon hostess Adele Bloch-Bauer and uncle of Jewish refugee Maria Altmann, he commissioned Gustav Klimt to paint Adele Bloch-Bauer I and Adele Bloch-Bauer II, the former being the centerpiece of the 2015 movie Woman in Gold with Helen Mirren.

== Biography ==
Ferdinand Bloch was the youngest of six children of sugar industrialist David Bloch and Marie Bloch Straschnow. He worked his way into the family business in Prague in 1881 before becoming director of the company in 1892.

After wedding the notable socialite and patron of the arts Adele Bloch-Bauer in 1899, the couple moved to the 4th district of Vienna, where they expanded their art collection of paintings, sculpture, and classic Viennese porcelain that rivaled any museum in Europe. Ferdinand began commissioning the most sought after painter in Austria at that time, Gustav Klimt, to paint pictures of Adele, who became the only woman to have two full length portraits done by the artist.

Adele died in 1925 of Meningitis at the age of 43. One of Ferdinand's last art acquisitions was a portrait his friend Oskar Kokoschka painted of him in 1936.

After the Anschluss in March 1938, most of Ferdinand's art collection was looted and he was exiled from Austria for his Jewish ancestry. He eventually landed in Switzerland, where he died nearly penniless in 1945. In his will, Ferdinand Bloch-Bauer left his fortune to the children of his brother Gustav Bloch: half of his fortune went to his favorite niece Louise Baroness Gutmann (1907–1998), the other half in equal shares to his nephew Robert Bloch-Bauer Bentley (1903–1987) and his niece Maria Altmann.

== Restitution of Ferdinand's Klimt paintings ==
After Adele's passing in 1925 there was a request found in her will that upon her death Ferdinand was to donate Adele Bloch-Bauer I, dubbed The Gold Portrait, to the Belvedere Palace in Vienna. At the time she was "entirely unaware" of the pending horror that would come when the Nazis annexed Austria in 1938. When Ferdinand was forced to flee Austria just a few days before Kristallnacht, he had to leave the painting of Adele and other works from Gustav Klimt behind. Just as the will had instructed, the portrait was gifted to the Austrian Gallery, in 1941.

Over a half century later, in 1998, Austrian investigative journalist Hubertus Czernin was permitted access to records at the Austrian Gallery in Vienna. He began publishing articles about the "suspicious" ownership of Adele's portrait and four other Klimts. One of his finds was the will of Ferdinand, who died twenty years after Adele, indicating his heirs, including his niece Maria Altmann, were to receive all the paintings. Since he had paid for the works, his will had now essentially rendered Adele's will obsolete. Czernin's articles and his startling discovery paved the way for Maria and her lawyer E. Randol Schoenberg to launch a nearly decade long legal battle to gain rightful ownership of the Bloch-Bauer estate. In 2004, Altmann and two other heirs were awarded all five Klimt works in a landmark Supreme Court decision that restituted $325 million.
