= Anne-Marie O'Connor =

American writer

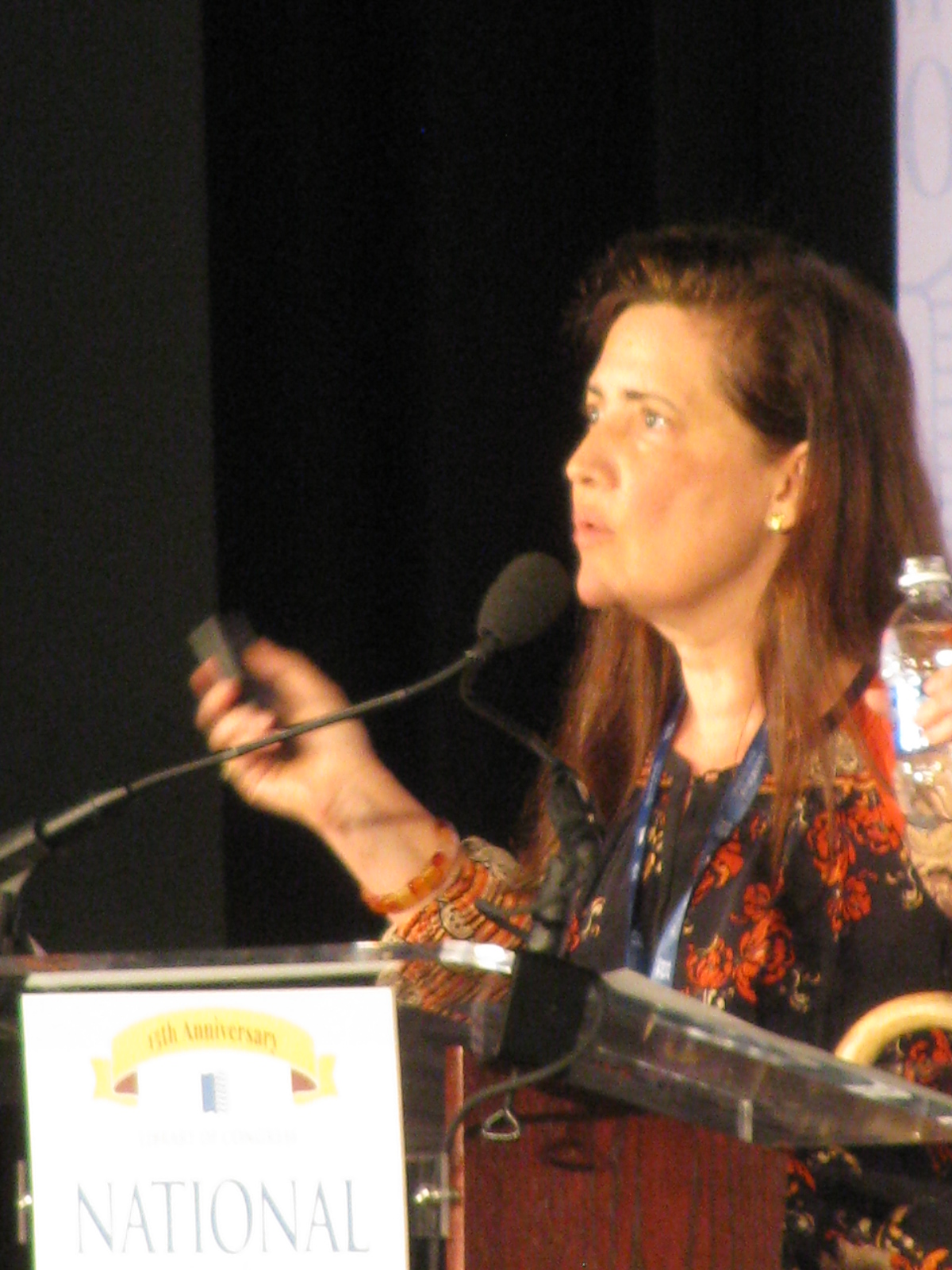
- Born: 1959 (age 66–67)
- Education: University of California at Berkley
- Occupation: Journalist
- Writing career
- Genre: Non-fiction
- Website: www.annemarieoconnor.com

Anne-Marie O'Connor is an American journalist and writer who authored The Lady in Gold: The Extraordinary Tale of Gustav Klimt's Masterpiece, Portrait of Adele Bloch-Bauer. The book is about the eight-year legal battle by Vienna emigre Maria Altmann, represented by Los Angeles attorney E. Randol Schoenberg, to reclaim five Gustav Klimt paintings from her native Austria. This saga that also inspired a Harvey Weinstein movie, Woman in Gold, in which Helen Mirren played Maria Altmann. One of the paintings, Portrait of Adele Bloch-Bauer, sold for a record $135 million in 2006 to Ronald Lauder's Neue Galerie New York, where the painting is on view.

== Career ==
A journalist and a writer, O'Connor was a correspondent in Mexico City for The Washington Post. She has also worked as a Reuters bureau chief for Central America, as a writer for the Los Angeles Times, and as a contributor to Esquire, The Nation, and Christian Science Monitor. As a foreign correspondent, O'Connor has covered wars in El Salvador, Nicaragua, and Guatemala. Her first book, The Lady in Gold, is about the Nazi plunder of paintings by Gustav Klimt.

== Selected works ==
- The Lady in Gold: The Extraordinary Tale of Gustav Klimt's Masterpiece, Portrait of Adele Bloch-Bauer. Knopf. January 2012. ISBN 978-0-307-26564-7.
