= Maria Altmann =

Austrian-American Jewish refugee (1916–2011)

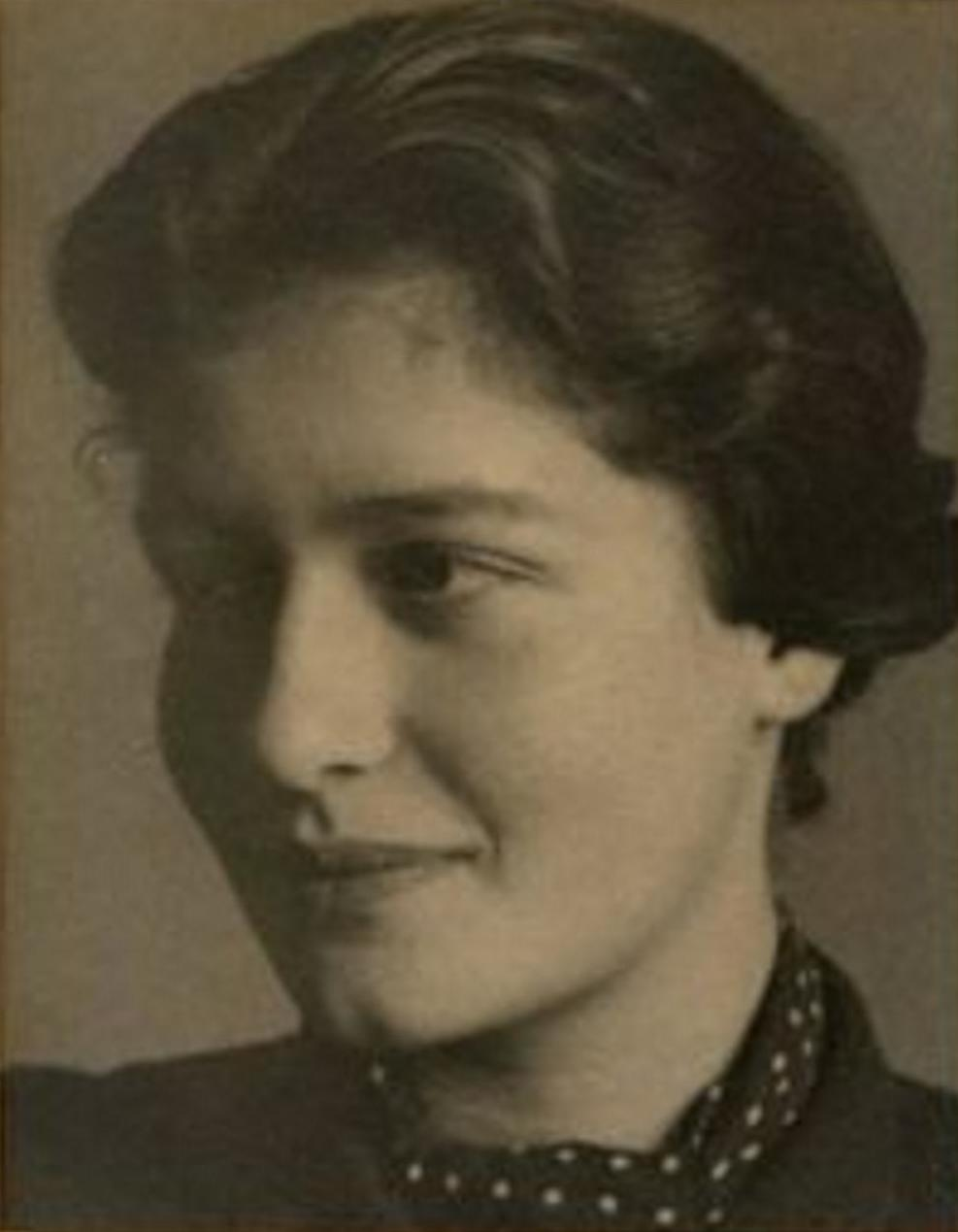
- Altmann in 1935
- Born: Maria Victoria Bloch; February 18, 1916; Vienna, Austria-Hungary
- Died: February 7, 2011 (aged 94); Los Angeles, California, U.S.
- Known for: The recovery of five family-owned paintings by Gustav Klimt, stolen by the Nazis during World War II
- Spouse: Frederick "Fritz" Altmann (m. 1937; died 1994)
- Children: 4
- Relatives: Viktor Gutmann (brother in law) Bernhard Altmann (brother in law) Ferdinand Bloch-Bauer (uncle) Adele Bloch-Bauer (aunt) Peter Bentley (nephew)

Maria Altmann (née Maria Victoria Bloch, later Bloch-Bauer; February 18, 1916 – February 7, 2011) was an Austrian-American, who fled her home country after it was annexed to the Nazi’s Third Reich. She is noted for her successful legal campaign to reclaim, from the Government of Austria, five family-owned paintings by the artist Gustav Klimt, stolen by the Nazis during World War II.

== Early life ==
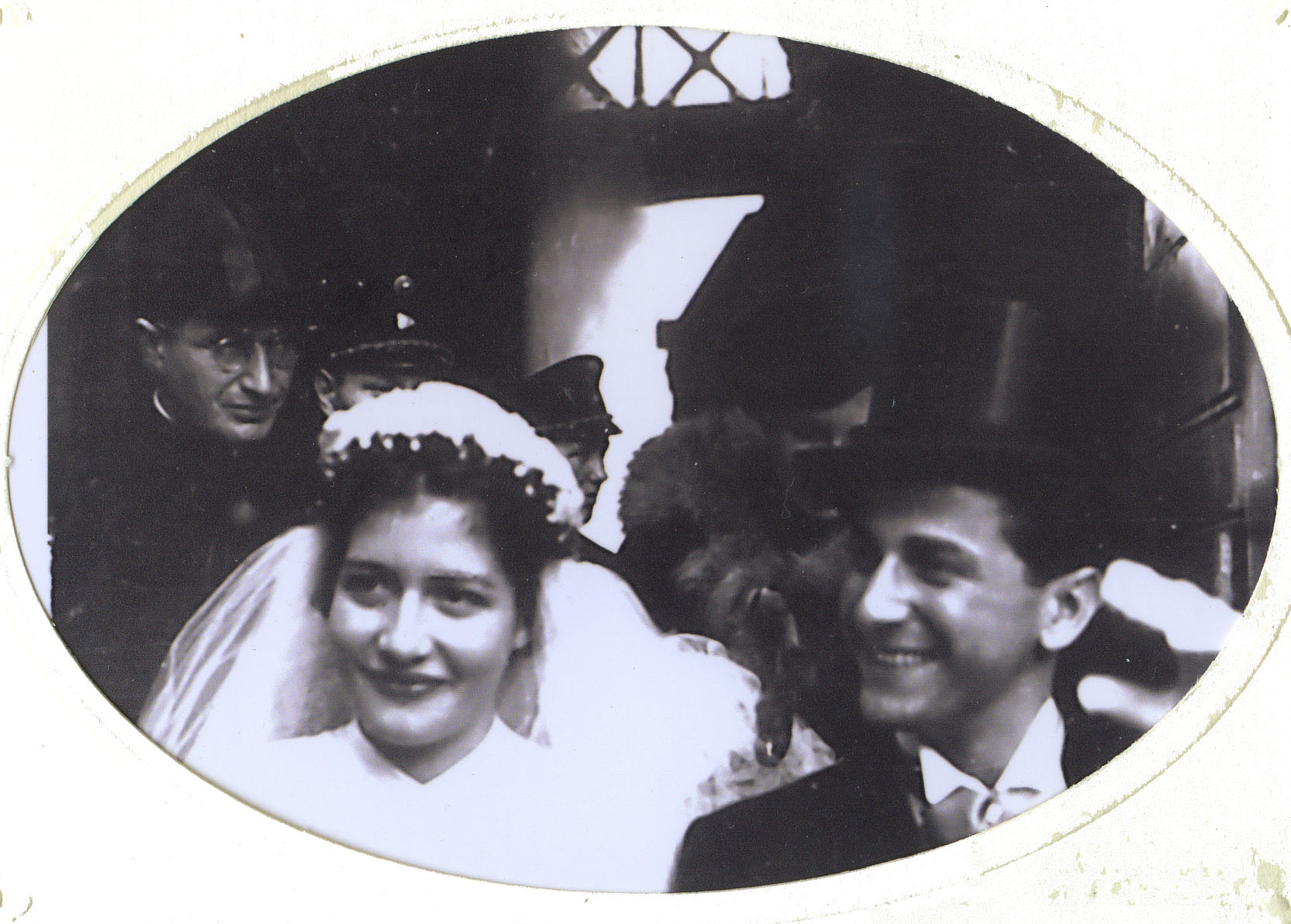
Maria and Fritz on their wedding day in 1937, three months before the Anschluss

Maria Altmann was born Maria Victoria Bloch on February 18, 1916, in Vienna, Austria-Hungary, the daughter of Marie Therese (née Bauer 1874–1961) and Gustav Bloch (1862–1938). The family name was changed to Bloch-Bauer the following year.

She was a niece of Adele Bloch-Bauer, a wealthy Jewish patron of the arts who served as the model for some of Klimt's best-known paintings. Her Viennese salon regularly attracted the most prominent artists of the day, including Gustav Mahler, Richard Strauss, Arthur Schnitzler, Franz Werfel, Alma Mahler, Leo Slezak, Otto Wagner, George Minne, Karl Renner, Julius Tandler, and Klimt. Maria was close friends in the 1930s with Viennese actor and Hollywood transplant Walter Slezak. Her nephew was Canadian businessman and arts patron Peter Bentley.

In 1937, Maria married Fredrick "Fritz" Altmann. Not long after their Paris honeymoon, Austria was annexed by Nazi Germany. Under the Nazis, Fredrick was arrested and held hostage at the Dachau concentration camp to force his brother Bernhard Altmann, by then safely in England, to transfer his successful Bernhard Altmann textile factory into German hands. Fredrick was released and the couple fled, leaving behind home, loved ones, and property (including jewelry that later found its way into the collection of Hermann Göring). Many of their friends and relatives were either killed by the Nazis or committed suicide. Traveling by way of Liverpool, England, they reached the United States and settled first in Fall River, Massachusetts, and finally in the Los Angeles neighborhood of Cheviot Hills. Maria Altmann's cousin, Ruth Rogers-Altmann, made it out of Vienna around the same time and settled in New York.

Shortly after Maria arrived in Los Angeles in 1942, Bernhard Altmann mailed her a sweater made of cashmere wool – a luxury fabric not yet widely available in the United States – accompanied with the note: "See what you can do with this." Maria took the sweater to Kerr's Department Store in Beverly Hills and attracted a multitude of buyers in California and across the United States for Bernhard Altmann's cashmere sweaters. Maria became the face of cashmere in California and eventually started her own clothing business. Among her clients was Caroline Brown Tracy, the mother of actor Spencer Tracy.

Altmann became a naturalized American citizen in 1945. Her husband died in 1994.

== Background to the Klimt case ==
Altmann's uncle, Czech sugar magnate Ferdinand Bloch-Bauer, owned a small collection of artwork by Gustav Klimt, including two portraits of his wife, Adele Bloch-Bauer. In her will, Adele, who died in 1925, had asked her husband to leave the Klimt paintings to the Austrian State Gallery upon his death; a much-debated point later was whether this request should be considered legally binding upon her husband, who was himself the owner of the paintings. Following the Anschluss of 1938 and Ferdinand's flight from Austria, the paintings were looted, initially falling into the hands of a Nazi lawyer. Ferdinand Bloch-Bauer died on November 13, 1945, leaving his estate to a nephew and two nieces, one of whom was Maria Altmann. By this time, six of the paintings, Buchenwald (1903), Adele Bloch-Bauer I (1907), Schloss Kammer am Attersee III (1910), Adele Bloch-Bauer II (1912), Apfelbaum I (1912) and Häuser in Unterach am Attersee (1916), had made their way into the possession of the Austrian government.

With Austria under pressure in the 1990s to re-examine its Nazi past, the Austrian Green Party helped pass a new law in 1998 introducing greater transparency into the murky process of dealing with the issue of restitution of artworks looted during the Nazi period. By opening the archives of the Ministry of Culture for the first time, the new law enabled Austrian investigative journalist Hubertus Czernin to discover that, contrary to what had been generally assumed, Ferdinand Bloch-Bauer had never donated the paintings to the state museum.

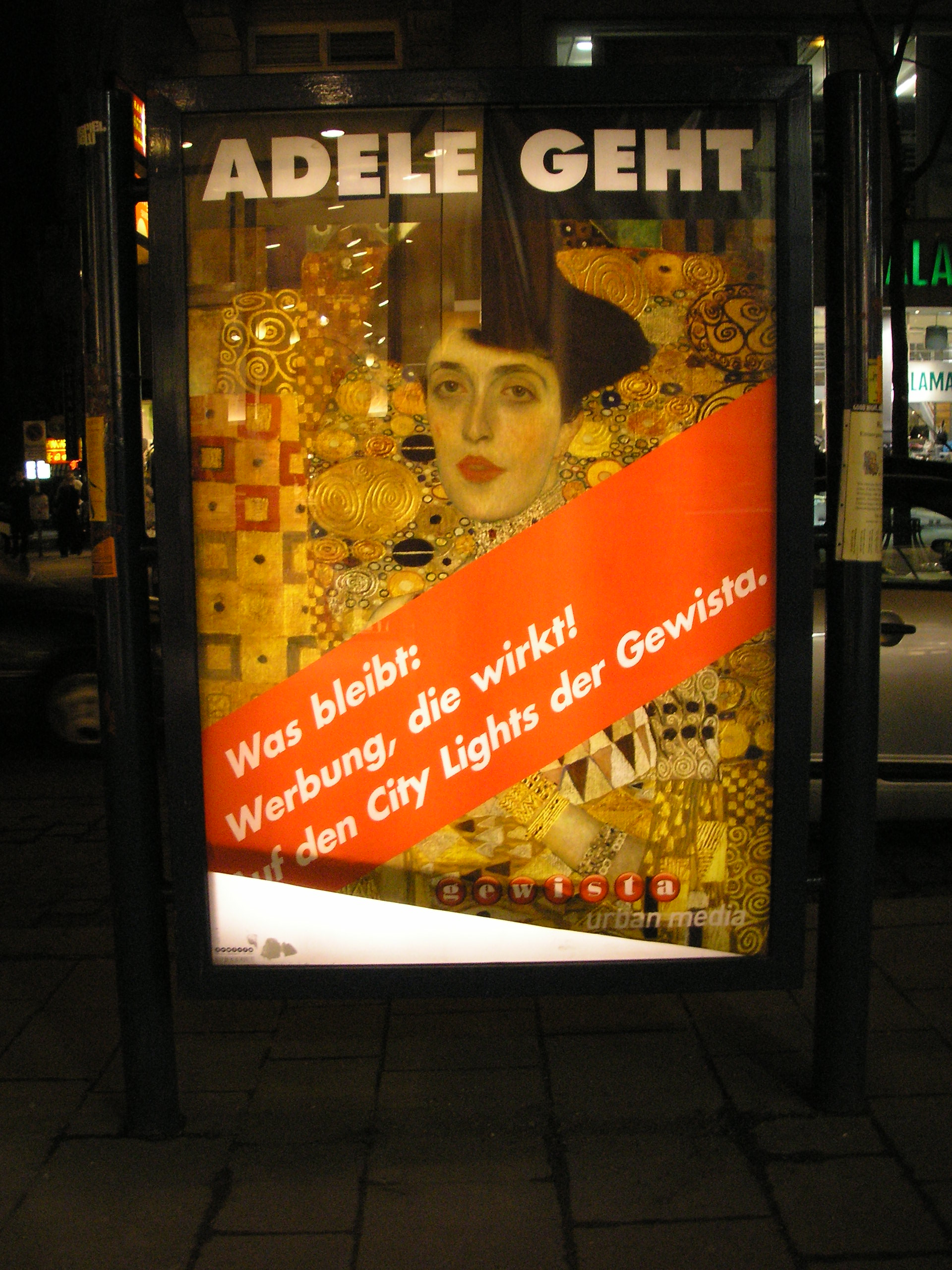
Poster in Vienna in 2006, bidding goodbye to the painting Adele Bloch-Bauer

On learning of Czernin's findings, Altmann first sought to negotiate with the Austrian government about retrieving some of the paintings. At this stage, she asked only for the Klimt landscapes belonging to her family, and was willing to allow Austria to keep the portraits. Her proposal was not, however, treated seriously by the Austrian authorities. In 1999, she tried suing the government of Austria in an Austrian court. Under Austrian law, however, the filing fee for such a lawsuit was determined as a percentage of the recoverable amount. At the time, the five paintings were estimated to be worth approximately US$135 million, making the filing fee over $1.5 million. Although the Austrian courts later reduced this amount to $350,000, this was still too much for Altmann, and she dropped her case in the Austrian court system.

In 2000, Altmann filed a lawsuit in the United States District Court for the Central District of California with her lawyer E. Randol Schoenberg under the Foreign Sovereign Immunities Act. The case, Republic of Austria v. Altmann, ended up in the Supreme Court of the United States, which ruled in 2004 that Austria was not immune from such a lawsuit. After this decision, Altmann and Austria agreed to binding arbitration by a panel of three Austrians. On January 16, 2006, the arbitration panel ruled that Austria was legally required to return the art to Altmann and the other family heirs, and in March of the same year Austria returned the paintings.

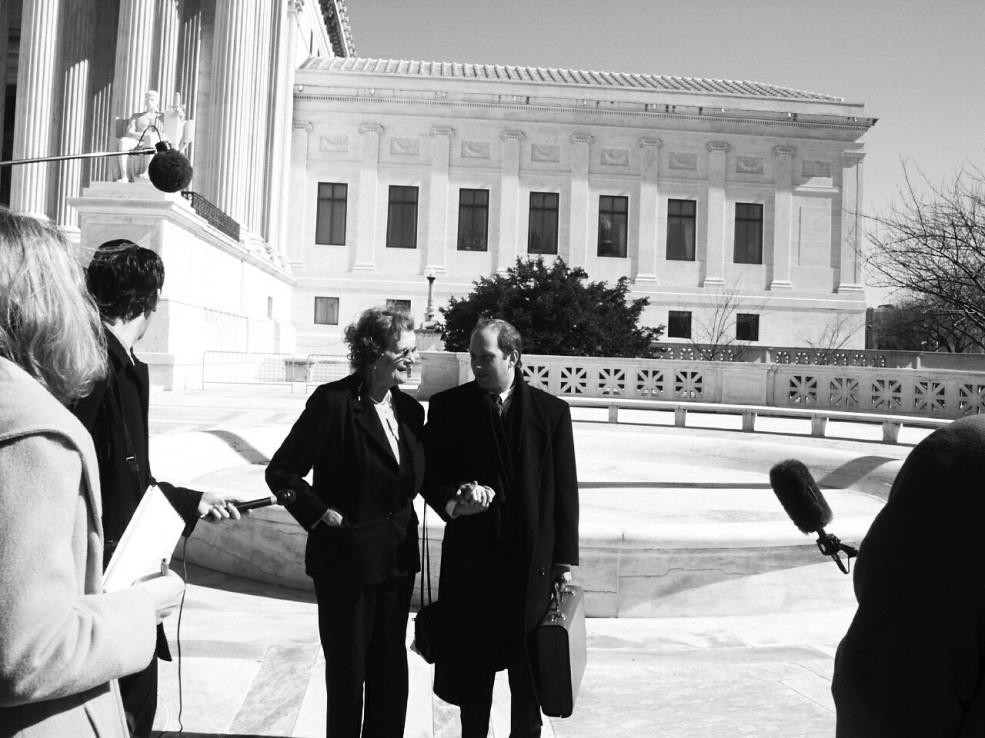
Maria and lawyer E. Randol Schoenberg in 2004 after Supreme Court victory

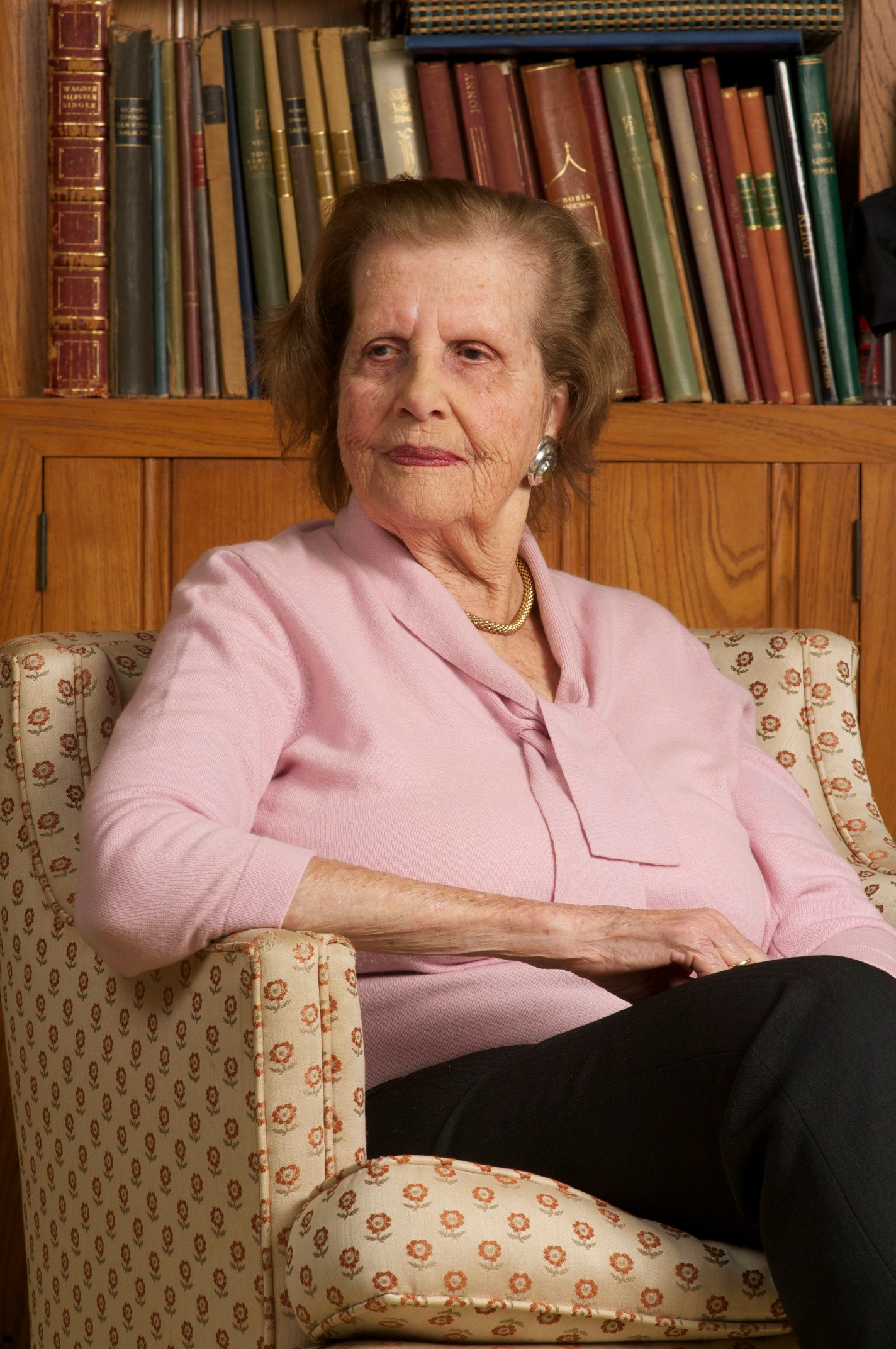
Altmann at her home in Cheviot Hills in 2010

The paintings were estimated to be collectively worth at least $150 million when returned. In monetary terms this represented the largest single return of Nazi-looted art in Austria. The paintings left Austria in March 2006 and were on display at the Los Angeles County Museum of Art until June 30, 2006. Months after the Austrian government returned Altmann's family's belongings, she consigned the Klimt paintings to the auction house Christie's to be sold on behalf of her family. The painting Portrait of Adele Bloch-Bauer I (1907) was sold to cosmetics heir Ronald Lauder for $135 million, at the time the highest sum ever paid for a painting. Since July 13, 2006, the painting has been on public display in the Neue Galerie in New York City, which was established by Lauder in 2001. The four additional works by Klimt were also exhibited at the Neue Gallerie for several weeks in 2006.

In November 2006, Adele Bloch-Bauer II was sold at auction at Christie's in New York to an undisclosed buyer, fetching almost $88 million. Christie's North America Chairman Stephen Lash later revealed that the buyer was Oprah Winfrey. In total, the four remaining paintings sold at auction for $192.7 million; coupled with the Lauder-bought painting the sum total was approximately $325 million. The proceeds were divided among several heirs.

A share of the money earned through the sale of the paintings was used to found the Maria Altmann Family Foundation, which supports the Los Angeles Museum of the Holocaust, the Los Angeles Opera, and other public and philanthropic institutions.

== Death ==
Altmann died on February 7, 2011, at her home in the Cheviot Hills neighborhood of Los Angeles, 11 days shy of her 95th birthday. Obituaries appeared in The New York Times, The Guardian, and many other publications internationally.

== Legacy ==
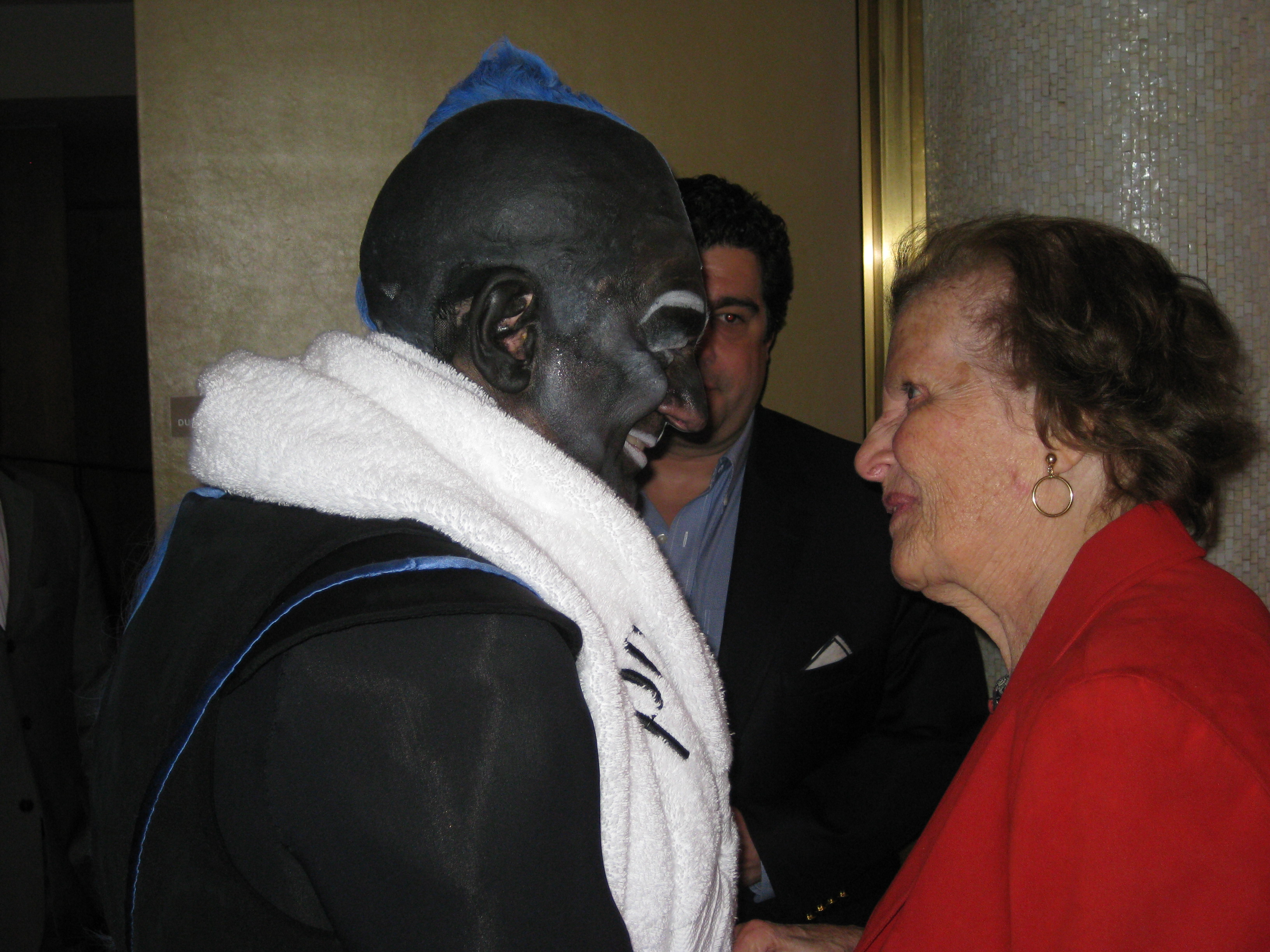
Backstage with Plácido Domingo at a production of Die Walküre at the Los Angeles Music Center in 2009; Domingo's son in background

Altmann's story has been recounted in three documentary films. Stealing Klimt, released in 2007, features interviews with Altmann and others who were closely involved with the case. Adele's Wish, released in 2008 by filmmaker Terrence Turner, features interviews with Altmann, Schoenberg, and leading experts from around the world. The Rape of Europa, a documentary about the Nazi plunder, also included material about Altmann. Her life story and battle to reclaim the family Klimt collection is recounted in the book The Lady in Gold, the Extraordinary Tale of Gustav Klimt's Masterpiece, Portrait of Adele Bloch-Bauer, by Anne-Marie O'Connor.

Altmann is portrayed in the 2012 memoir The Accidental Caregiver by Gregor Collins, which documents their chance meeting and three years together, ending at her death in 2011. Collins has spoken about their unusual relationship at several venues and events around the world.

Altmann is portrayed by Helen Mirren and Tatiana Maslany in the 2015 film Woman in Gold, chronicling Altmann's nearly decade-long struggle to recover the Klimt paintings. The film also stars Ryan Reynolds as E. Randol Schoenberg.

Laurie Lico Albanese's 2017 historical fiction novel, Stolen Beauty, tells the story of Maria Altmann and her aunt Adele Bloch-Bauer.

== See also ==
- National Fund of the Republic of Austria for Victims of National Socialism
- List of claims for restitution for Nazi-looted art
