= Portrait of Adele Bloch-Bauer II =

1912 painting by Gustav Klimt

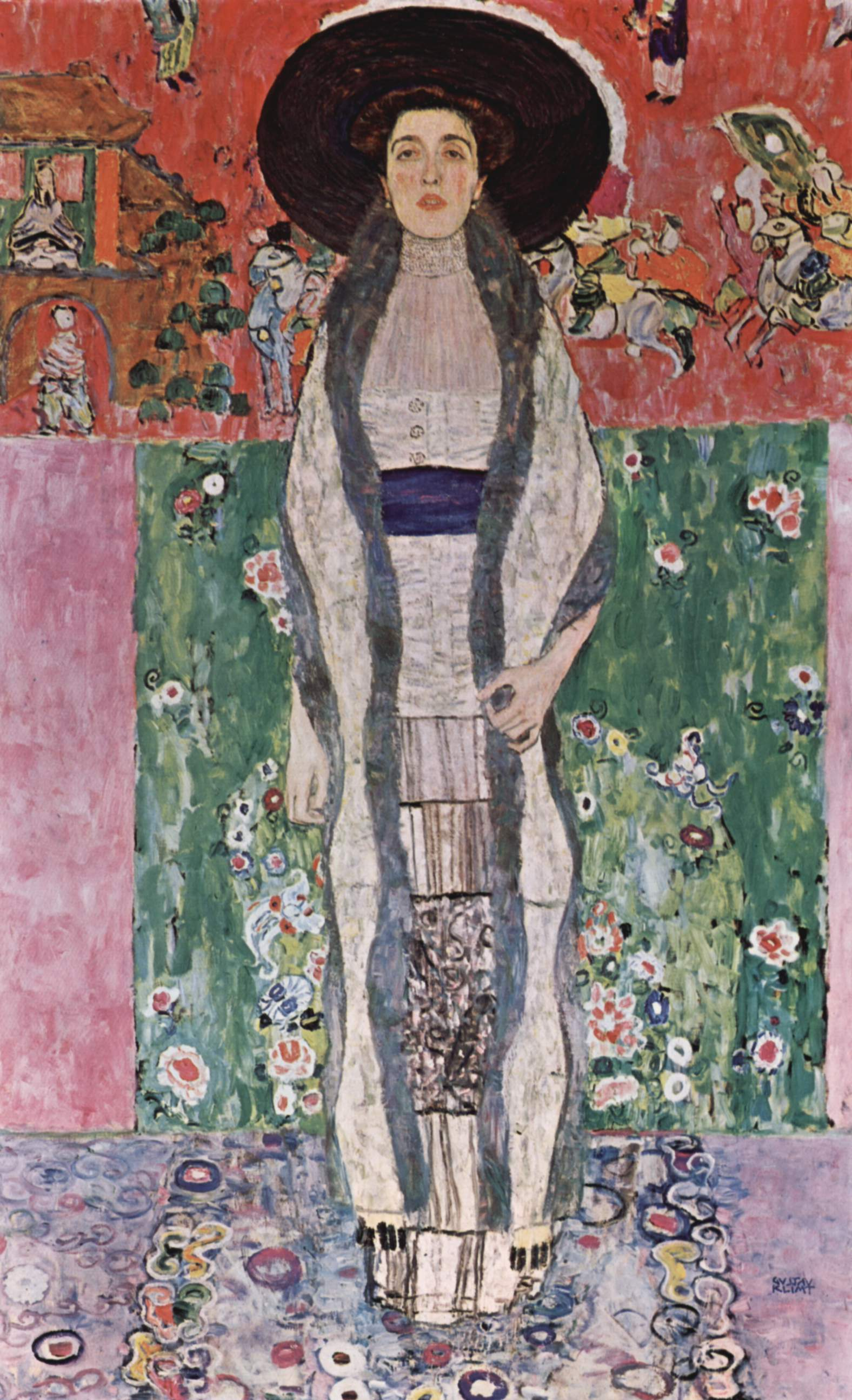
- Artist: Gustav Klimt
- Year: 1912
- Medium: Oil on canvas
- Subject: Adele Bloch-Bauer
- Dimensions: 190 cm × 120 cm (75 in × 47 in)
- Location: Private collection

Portrait of Adele Bloch-Bauer II is a 1912 painting by Gustav Klimt. The work is a portrait of Adele Bloch-Bauer (1881–1925), a Vienna socialite who was a patron and close friend of Klimt.

In 1907, Klimt completed an earlier portrait of Bloch-Bauer. During World War II, both portraits were among the artworks stolen by the Nazis from the family of Bloch-Bauer. After the war, Portrait of Adele Bloch-Bauer II was displayed at the Österreichische Galerie Belvedere until 2006, when it was returned to Adele Bloch-Bauer's niece Maria Altmann, following a decision by an Austrian arbitration panel.

== Ownership ==
Adele Bloch-Bauer was the wife of Ferdinand Bloch-Bauer, (Note: Born Ferdinand Bloch, the son of David Bloch (also known as Abraham Bloch), a banker and sugar factory owner, and his wife Marie, née Straschnow. Ferdinand married Adele Bauer, the daughter of Moritz Bauer (director of the Wiener Bankverein) and his wife Jeanette, née Honig) a wealthy industrialist who sponsored the arts and supported Gustav Klimt. Adele Bloch-Bauer was the only person whose portrait was painted twice by Klimt; she also appeared in the much more famous Portrait of Adele Bloch-Bauer I. Adele's portraits had hung in the family home prior to their seizure by the Nazis during World War II. The Austrian museum where they resided after the war was reluctant to return them to their rightful owners, hence a protracted court battle in the United States and in Austria (see Republic of Austria v. Altmann) ensued, which resulted in the two Adele Bloch-Bauer portraits and three other Gustav Klimt paintings being returned to Maria Altmann, the niece of Ferdinand Bloch-Bauer, in January 2006.

In November 2006, Christie's auction house under New York Chairman Stephen Lash sold Portrait of Adele Bloch-Bauer II at auction for almost $88 million, the fourth-highest priced piece of art at auction at the time. The buyer was Oprah Winfrey.

The painting was temporarily lent to Neue Galerie New York for the exhibition "Klimt and the Women of Vienna’s Golden Age, 1900–1918", temporarily reuniting it with Portrait I. In the fall of 2014, Adele Bloch-Bauer II was given as a special long-term loan to the Museum of Modern Art in New York City. During the summer of 2016, Winfrey sold it to an unidentified Chinese buyer for $150 million.

== Exhibitions ==
- 4 April – 30 June 2006: Gustav Klimt: Five Paintings from the Collection of Ferdinand and Adele Bloch-Bauer; LACMA, Los Angeles, USA
- 13 July – 9 October 2006: Gustav Klimt: Five Paintings From the Collection of Ferdinand and Adele Bloch-Bauer; Neue Galerie, New York City, USA
- 5 September 2014 – 15 August 2016: Gustav Klimt's Adele Bloch-Bauer II; MoMa, New York City, USA
- 22 September 2016 – 16 January 2017: Klimt and the Women of Vienna's Golden Age, 1900–1918; Neue Galerie, New York City, USA
- 7 October 2022 – 8 January 2023: Golden Boy Gustav Klimt: Inspired by Van Gogh, Rodin, Matisse...; Van Gogh Museum, Amsterdam, Netherlands
- 9 November 2023 – 11 February 2024: Adele Bloch-Bauer II; Belvedere, Vienna, Austria

== See also ==
- Portrait of Adele Bloch-Bauer I
- Republic of Austria v. Altmann
- List of paintings by Gustav Klimt
- List of most expensive paintings
