= Portrait of Adele Bloch-Bauer I =

1907 painting by Gustav Klimt

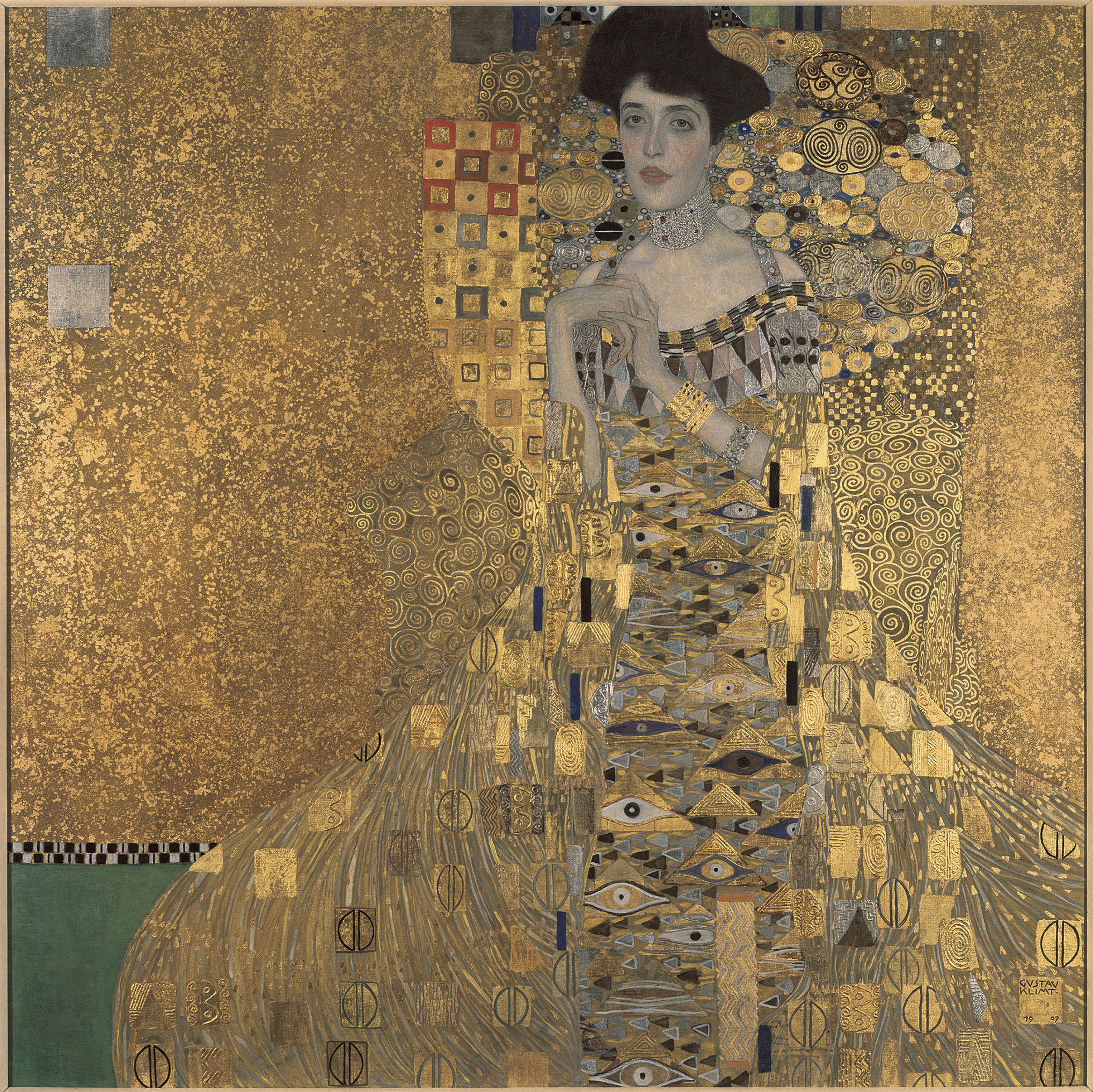
- Artist: Gustav Klimt
- Year: 1907
- Type: Oil and gold leaf on canvas
- Subject: Adele Bloch-Bauer
- Dimensions: 140 cm × 140 cm (55⅛ in × 55⅛ in)
- Location: Neue Galerie, New York City

Portrait of Adele Bloch-Bauer I (also called The Lady in Gold or The Woman in Gold) is an oil painting on canvas, with gold leaf, by Gustav Klimt, completed between 1903 and 1907. The portrait was commissioned by the sitter's husband, Ferdinand Bloch-Bauer, a Viennese and Jewish banker and sugar producer. The painting was stolen by the Nazis in 1941, and displayed at the Österreichische Galerie Belvedere. The portrait is the final and most fully representative work of Klimt's golden phase. It was the first of two depictions of Adele by Klimt—the second was completed in 1912; these were two of several works by the artist that the Bloch-Bauer family owned.

Adele died in 1925; her will asked that the artworks by Klimt be eventually left to the Galerie Belvedere, although these works belonged to Ferdinand, not her. Following the Anschluss of Austria by Nazi Germany, and due to the Nazi persecution of Jews, Ferdinand fled Vienna, and made his way to Switzerland, leaving behind much of his wealth, including his large art collection. The painting was stolen by the Nazis in 1941, along with the remainder of Ferdinand's assets, after a false charge of tax evasion was made against him. The lawyer acting on behalf of the German state gave the portrait to the Galerie Belvedere, claiming he was following the wishes Adele had made in her will. Ferdinand died in 1945; his will stated that his estate should go to his nephew and two nieces.

In 1998 the Austrian investigative journalist Hubertus Czernin established that the Galerie Belvedere contained several works stolen from Jewish owners in the war and that the gallery had refused to return the art to their original owners or to acknowledge a theft had taken place. One of Ferdinand's nieces, Maria Altmann, hired the lawyer E. Randol Schoenberg to make a claim against the gallery for the return of five works by Klimt. In 2006 after a seven-year legal claim, which included a hearing in front of the Supreme Court of the United States, an arbitration committee in Vienna agreed that the painting, and others, had been stolen from the family and that it should be returned to Altmann. She sold it the same year for US$135 million, at the time a record price for a painting, to the businessman and art collector Ronald Lauder to place the work in the Neue Galerie, the public New York–based gallery he co-founded.

== Background ==
=== Gustav Klimt ===
Gustav Klimt was born in 1862 in Baumgarten, near Vienna in Austria-Hungary. He attended the Vienna School of Arts and Crafts (German: Kunstgewerbeschule Wien) before taking on commissions with his brother, Ernst, and a fellow-student Franz von Matsch from 1879. Over the next decade, alongside several private commissions for portraiture, they painted interior murals and ceilings in large public buildings, including the Burgtheater, the Kunsthistorisches Museum and the ceiling of the Great Hall at the University of Vienna.

Klimt worked in Vienna during the Belle Époque, during which time the city made "an extreme and lasting contribution to the history of modern art". During the 1890s he was influenced by European avant-garde art, including the works of the painters Fernand Khnopff, Jan Toorop, and Aubrey Beardsley. In 1897 he was a founding member and president of the Vienna Secession, a group of artists who wanted to break with what they saw as the prevailing conservatism of the Viennese Künstlerhaus. Klimt in particular challenged what he saw as the "hypocritical boundaries of respectability set by Viennese society"; according to the art historian Susanna Partsch, he was "the enfant terrible of the Viennese art scene, [and] was acknowledged to be the painter of beautiful women". By 1900 he was the preferred portrait painter of the wives of the largely Jewish Viennese bourgeoisie, an emerging class of self-made industrialists who were "buying the innovative new art that state museums rejected", according to the journalist Anne-Marie O'Connor.

From 1898 Klimt began to experiment with the style in what became known as his Byzantine or Golden period, when his works, stylistically influenced by Art Nouveau and the Arts and Crafts movement, were gilded with gold leaf. (Note: There is no agreed view on the dates of the golden period, although the art historian Elizabeth Clegg, writing in The Burlington Magazine puts the dates as 1903–1908; Néret writes that the period begins in 1906 and ends in 1909.) Klimt had begun using gold in his 1890 portrait of the pianist Joseph Pembauer, but his first work that included a golden theme was Pallas Athene (1898). The art historian Gilles Néret considers that the use of gold in the painting "underlines the essential erotic ingredient in ... [Klimt's] view of the world". Néret also states that Klimt used the gold to give subjects a sacred or magical quality.

=== Ferdinand and Adele Bloch-Bauer ===
Adele Bloch-Bauer, c. 1910

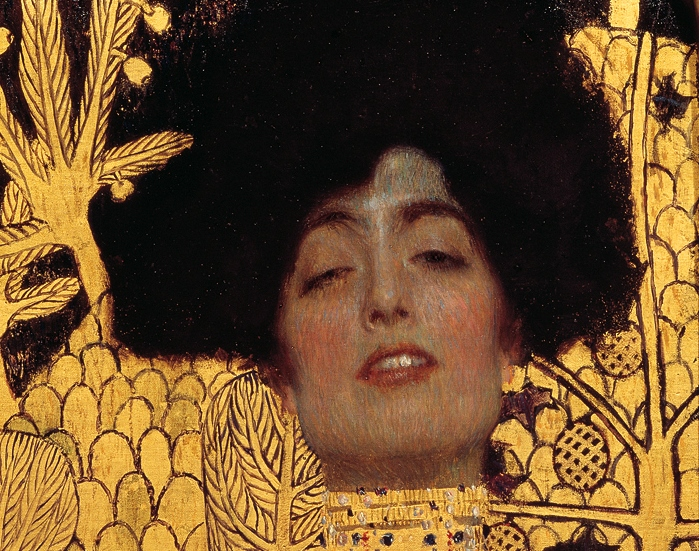
Detail of Judith I (1901), for which Adele modelled

Adele Bauer was from a wealthy Jewish-Viennese family. Her father was a director of the Wiener Bankverein, the seventh largest bank in Austria-Hungary, and the general director of the Oriental Railway. In the late 1890s Adele met Klimt, and may have begun a relationship with him. Opinion is divided on whether Adele and Klimt had an affair. The artist Catherine Dean considered that Adele was "the only society lady painted by Klimt who is known definitely to be his mistress", while the journalist Melissa Müller and the academic Monica Tatzkow write that "no evidence has ever been produced that their relationship was more than a friendship". The author Frank Whitford observes that some of the preliminary sketches that Klimt made for The Kiss showed a bearded figure which was possibly a self-portrait; the female partner is described by Whitford as an "idealised portrait of Adele". Whitford writes that the only evidence put forward to support the theory is the position of the woman's right hand, as Adele had a disfigured finger following a childhood accident.

Adele's parents arranged a marriage with Ferdinand Bloch, a banker and sugar manufacturer; Adele's older sister had previously married Ferdinand's older brother. Ferdinand was older than his fiancée and at the time of the marriage in December 1899, she was 18 and he was 35. The couple, who had no children, both changed their surnames to Bloch-Bauer. Socially well-connected, Adele brought together writers, politicians and intellectuals for regular salons at their home. (Note: Guests at the salon included the composers Gustav Mahler, Richard Strauss, and Alma Mahler, the politicians Karl Renner and Julius Tandler, and the writers Jakob Wassermann and Stefan Zweig.)

The couple shared a love of art and patronised several artists, collecting primarily nineteenth-century Viennese paintings and modern sculpture. Ferdinand also had a passion for neoclassical porcelain, and by 1934 his collection was over 400 pieces and one of the finest in the world.

In 1901 Klimt painted Judith I; the art historian Gottfried Fliedl observes that the painting is "widely known and interpreted as Salome". Adele was the model for the work and wore a heavily jewelled deep choker given to her by Ferdinand, in what Whitford describes as "Klimt's most erotic painting". Whitford also writes that the painting displays "apparent evidence of ... cuckoldry". In 1903 Ferdinand purchased his first Klimt work from the artist, Buchenwald (Beech Forest). (Note: Ferdinand later purchased other works by Klimt. In 1910 he obtained Schloss Kammer am Attersee III, a second commissioned portrait and Apfelbaum in 1912, and Häuser in Unterach am Attersee and Portrait of Amalie Zuckerlandl in 1918–1919.)

== The painting ==
=== Preparation and execution ===
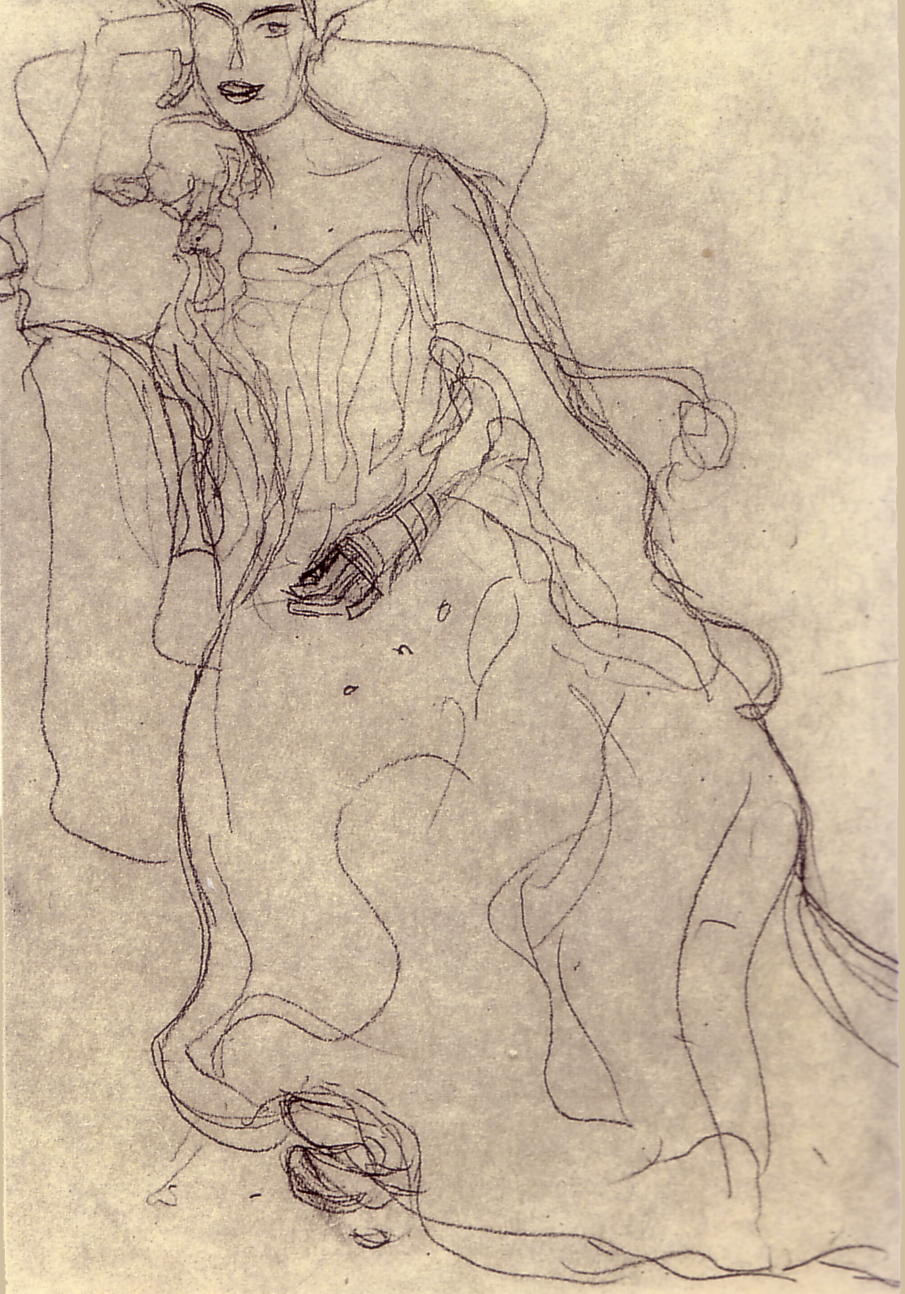
Preparatory sketch for the portrait, c.1903

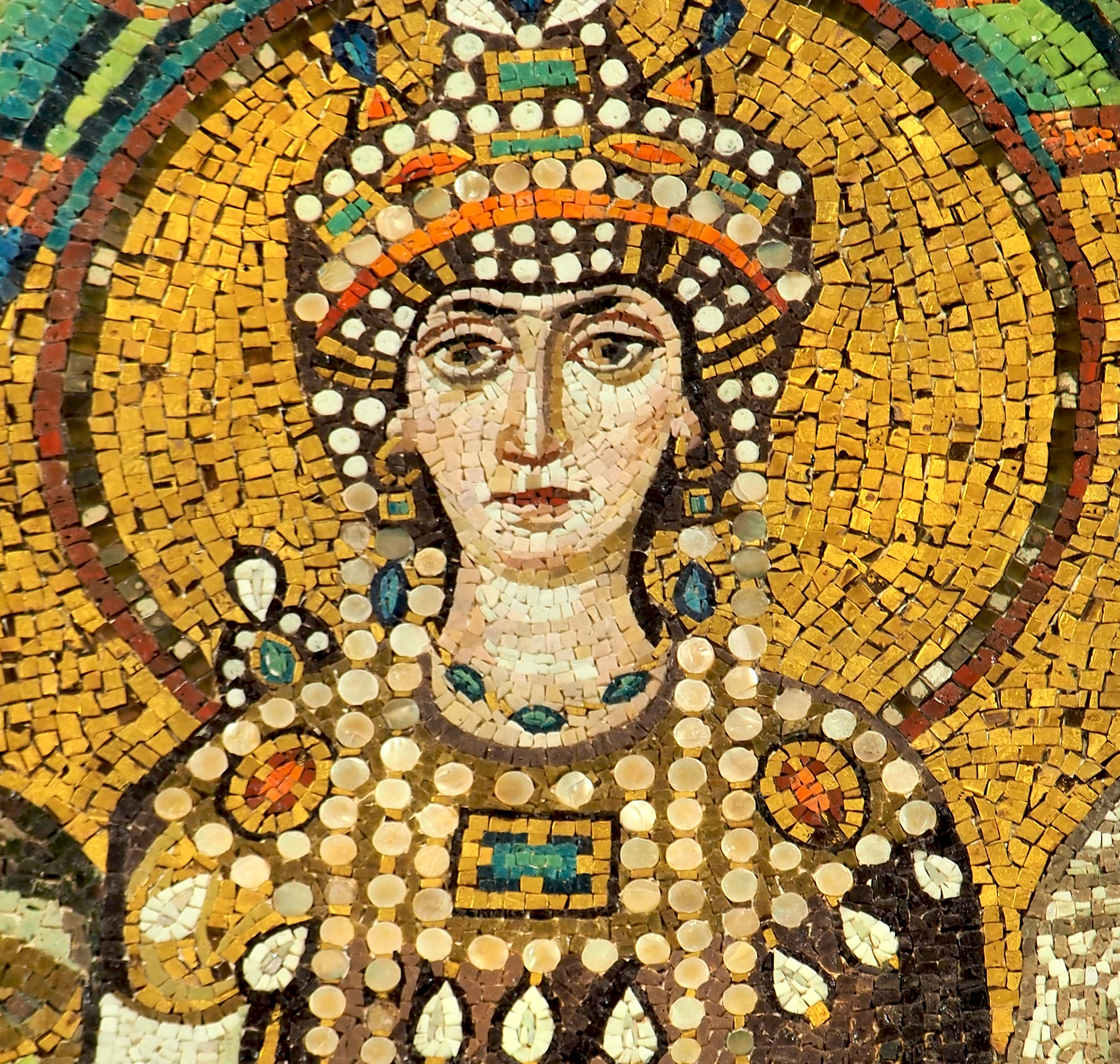
The mosaic of Empress Theodora at the Basilica of San Vitale, Ravenna

In mid-1903 Ferdinand Bloch-Bauer commissioned Klimt to paint a portrait of his wife; he wished to give the piece to Adele's parents as an anniversary present that October. Klimt drew over a hundred preparatory sketches for the portrait between 1903 and 1904. (Note: Without reference to a date of commission, Partsch considers that some initial sketches were undertaken in 1900.) The Bloch-Bauers purchased some of the sketches he had made of Adele when they obtained 16 Klimt drawings. In December 1903, along with fellow artist Maximilian Lenz, Klimt visited the Basilica of San Vitale in Ravenna, where he studied the early-Christian Byzantine gold ground mosaics of Justinian I and his wife, Empress Theodora. Lenz later wrote that "the mosaics made an immense decisive impression on ... [Klimt]. From this comes the resplendence, the stiff decoration of his art". Klimt later said that the "mosaics of unbelievable splendour" were a "revelation" to him. The Ravenna mosaics also attracted the attention of other artists who provided illustrations of the work, including Wassily Kandinsky in 1911 and Clive Bell in 1914.

Klimt undertook more extensive preparations for the portrait than any other piece he worked on. Much of the portrait was undertaken by an elaborate technique of using gold and silver leaf and then adding decorative motifs in bas-relief using gesso, a paint mixture consisting of a binder mixed with chalk or gypsum. The frame for the painting, covered in gold leaf, was made by the architect Josef Hoffmann. Klimt finished the work by 1907.

=== Description ===
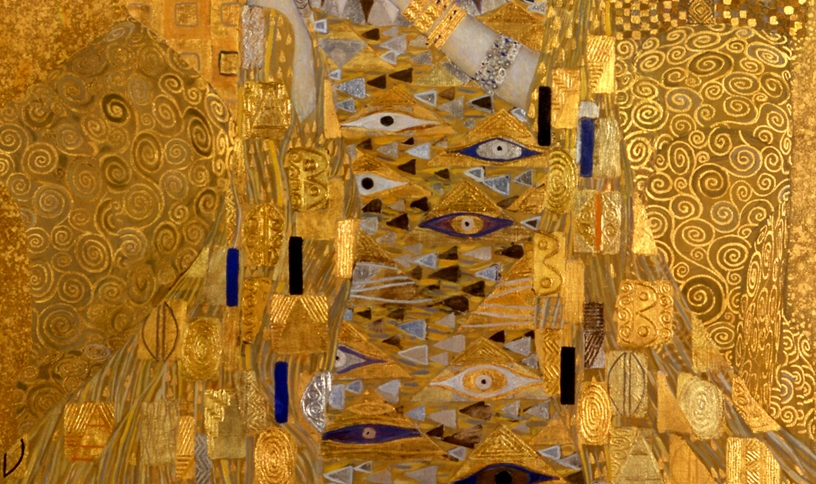
The decorative motifs: symbols suggestive of erotica

The painting measures 138 by 138 cm (54 by 54 in); (Note: The current holder of the portrait, the Neue Galerie New York, puts the measurement as 140 by 140 cm (55 by 55 in).) it is composed of oil paint and silver and gold leaf on canvas. The portrait shows Adele Bloch-Bauer sitting on a golden throne or chair, in front of a golden starry background. Around her neck is the same jewelled choker Klimt included in the Judith painting. She wears a tight golden dress in a triangular shape, made up of rectilinear forms. In places the dress merges into the background so much so that the museum curator Jan Thompson writes that "one comes across the model almost by accident, so enveloped is she in the thick geometric scheme". Peter Vergo, writing for Grove Art, considers that the painting "marks the height of ... [Klimt's] gold-encrusted manner of painting".

Adele's hair, face, décolletage and hands are painted in oil; they make up less than a twelfth of the work and, in Whitford's opinion, convey little about the sitter's character. For Whitford the effect of the gold background is to "remove Adele Bloch-Bauer from the earthly plane, transform the flesh and blood into an apparition from a dream of sensuality and self-indulgence"; he, and Thomson, consider the work to look more like a religious icon than a secular portrait. O'Connor writes that the painting "seem[s] to embody femininity" and thus likens it to the Mona Lisa, while for Müller and Tatzkow, the gold gives the effect that Adele appears "melancholy and vulnerable, unapproachably aloof and yet rapt".

Both the current holder of the portrait—the Neue Galerie New York—and the art historian Elana Shapira describe how the background and gown contain symbols suggestive of erotica, including triangles, eggs, shapes of eyes and almonds. Also present are decorative motifs on the theme of the letters A and B, the sitter's initials. Whitford identifies influences of the art of the Byzantine, Egypt, Mycenae, and Greece, describing that "the gold is like that in Byzantine mosaics; the eyes on the dress are Egyptian, the repeated coils and whorls Mycenaean, while other decorative devices, based on the initial letters of the sitter's name, are vaguely Greek".

== Reception ==
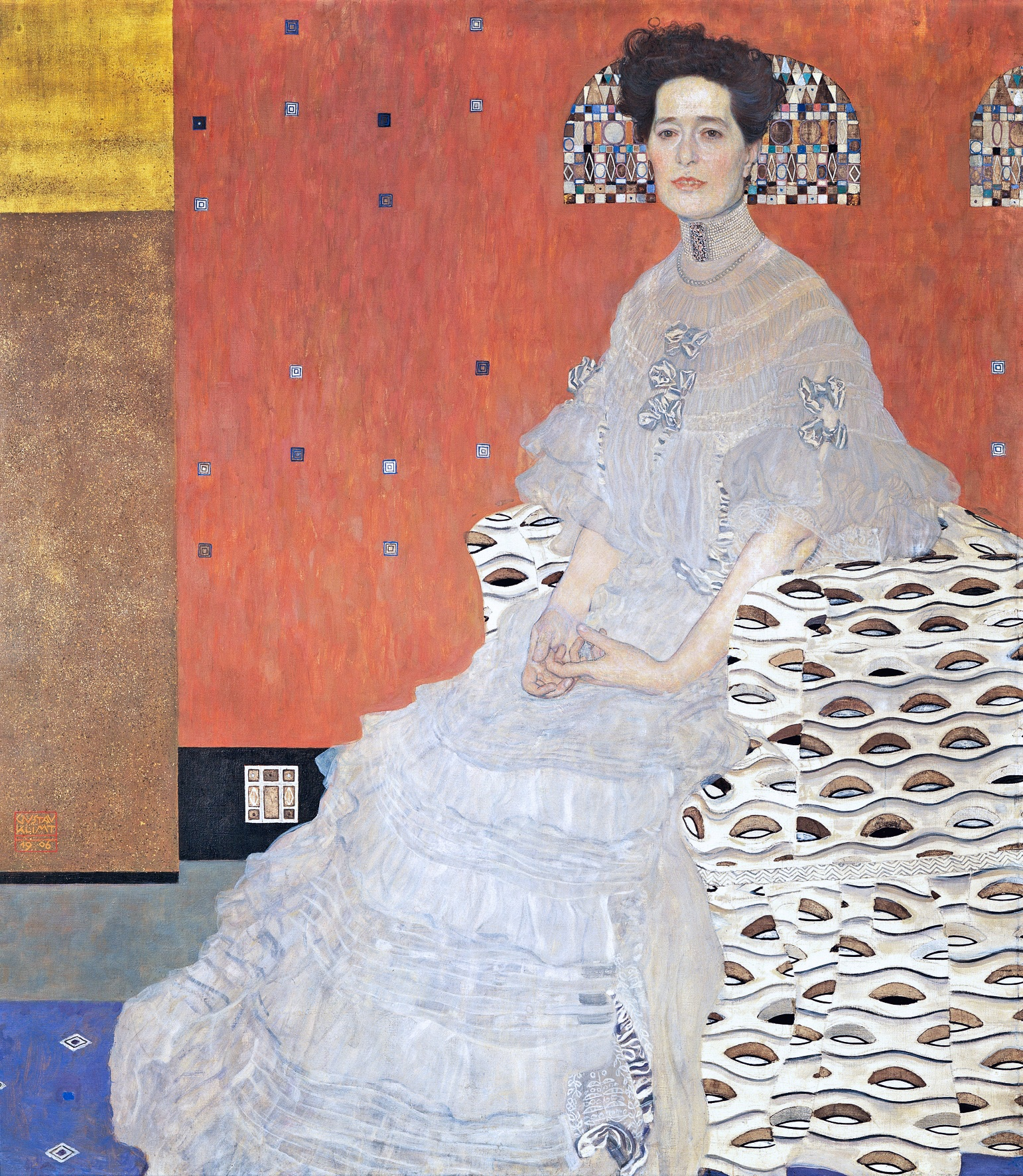
Portrait of Fritza Riedler (1906), exhibited and criticised alongside the Portrait of Adele Bloch-Bauer in 1907

Klimt exhibited his portrait at the 1907 Mannheim International Art Show, alongside the Portrait of Fritza Riedler (1906). Many of the critics had negative reactions to the two paintings, describing them as "mosaic-like wall-grotesqueries", "bizarre", "absurdities" and "vulgarities".

In 1908 the portrait was exhibited at the Kunstschau in Vienna, where critical reaction was mixed. The unnamed reviewer from the Wiener Allgemeine Zeitung described the painting as "an idol in a golden shrine", while the critic Eduard Pötzl described the work as "mehr Blech als Bloch" ("more brass than Bloch"). (Note: The art historian Julle M. Johnson states that the writer was Karl Kraus, not Pötzl.) According to the art historian Tobias G. Natter, some critics disapproved of the loss of the sitter's individuality, while others "accused Klimt of endangering the autonomy of art".

== History and ownership ==
=== Bloch-Bauer (1907–1941) ===
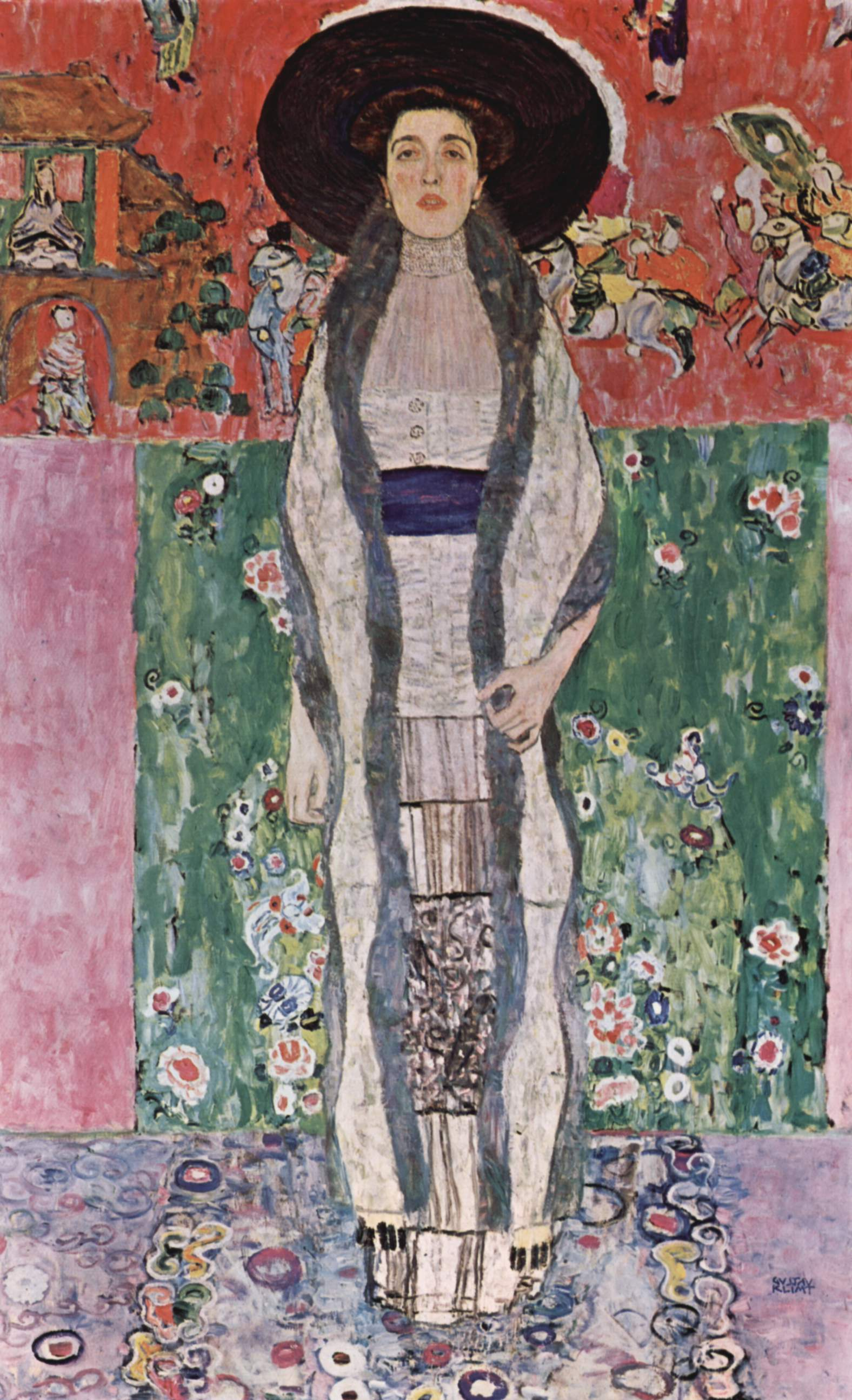
Portrait of Adele Bloch-Bauer II, the 1912 painting by Klimt

After exhibition at the Kunstschau, the portrait was hung at the Bloch-Bauer's Vienna residence. In 1912 Ferdinand commissioned a second painting of his wife, in which "the erotic charge of the likeness of 1907 has been spent", according to Whitford. In February 1918, Klimt suffered a stroke and was hospitalised; he caught pneumonia due to the worldwide influenza epidemic and died that month.

On 19 January 1923 Adele Bloch-Bauer wrote a will. Ferdinand's brother Gustav, a lawyer by training, helped her frame the document and was named as the executor. The will included a reference to the Klimt works owned by the couple, including the two portraits of her:

German: "Meine 2 Porträts und 4 Landschaften von Gustav Klimt, bitte ich meinen Ehegatten nach seinem Tode der österr. Staats-Galerie in Wien, die mir gehörende Wiener und Jungfer."

"I ask my husband, upon his death, bequeath my 2 portraits and the 4 landscapes by Gustav Klimt to the Austrian State Gallery in Vienna, namely Wiener ('Viennese') and Jungfer ('Maiden'), which belong to me."

In February 1925 Adele died of meningitis. Shortly afterwards Gustav Bloch filed for probate; he included a document that stated that the clause in the will was precatory, i.e. a request rather than a binding testament. He added that Ferdinand had said he would honour the clause, even though he, not Adele, was the legal owner of the paintings. The works by Klimt which Ferdinand owned, including the two portraits, were moved to Adele's bedroom as a shrine to her. The painting was lent for an exhibition at the Vienna Secession in 1928 to mark the tenth anniversary of Klimt's death; in 1934 it was displayed in London as part of the Austria in London exhibition. In 1936 Ferdinand gave Schloss Kammer am Attersee III to the Österreichische Galerie Belvedere; he later acquired a further Klimt painting, the Portrait of Amalie Zuckerkandl (1917–1918). In 1937 the golden portrait of Adele was lent for display at the Paris Exposition.

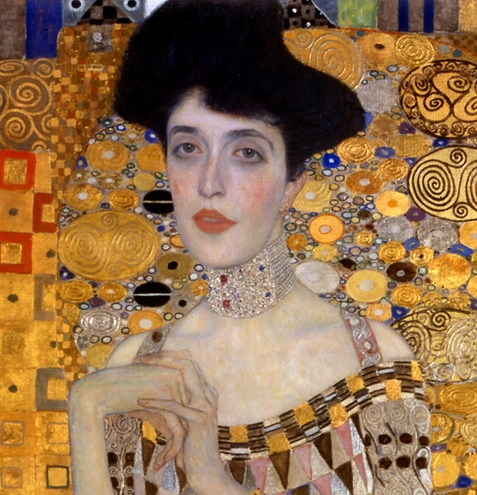
Detail showing the jewelled choker given to Maria Altmann on her wedding day and stolen by the Nazis

In December 1937 Gustav's daughter–and Ferdinand's niece–Maria, married the young opera singer Fritz Altman. Ferdinand gave her Adele's jewelled choker, depicted in the painting, as a wedding present. Ferdinand left Vienna for his Czechoslovak castle in March 1938, following the Anschluss (annexation) of Austria by Nazi Germany. That autumn, following the Munich Agreement allowing the Nazi annexations in Czechoslovakia, he realised he was not safe and left for Paris. In September the following year, he moved to neutral Switzerland where he lived in a hotel. In his absence the Nazi regime falsely accused him of evading taxes of 1.4 million Reichsmarks. His assets were frozen and, in May 1938, a seizure order was issued that allowed the state to dispose of his property as they felt fit. His sugar factory was confiscated and turned over to the state, and went through a process of Aryanisation as Jewish shareholders and managers were replaced. His Viennese residence became an office of Deutsche Reichsbahn, the German railway company, while his castle in Czechoslovakia was taken after the German occupation as the personal residence of the SS-Obergruppenführer Reinhard Heydrich.

As part of the process to deal with the purported tax evasion, the Nazi lawyer Friedrich Führer was appointed as the administrator of the estate. In January 1939 he convened a meeting of museum and gallery directors to inspect the works and to give an indication of which they would like to obtain. After the collection was catalogued, Adolf Hitler used the Führervorbehalt decree to obtain part of the collection at a reduced price. (Note: Hitler ordered three works by Rudolf von Alt and Ferdinand Georg Waldmüller's Portrait of Prince Esterhazy with White Rabbit to be transferred to his personal collection.) Several other Nazi leaders, including Hermann Göring, the Commander-in-Chief of the Luftwaffe, also obtained works from the collection. Göring also used the Führervorbehalt decree to obtain the jewelled choker that had been given to Maria Altmann; it was given as a gift to Emmy, his wife.

=== Österreichische Galerie Belvedere (1941–2006) ===
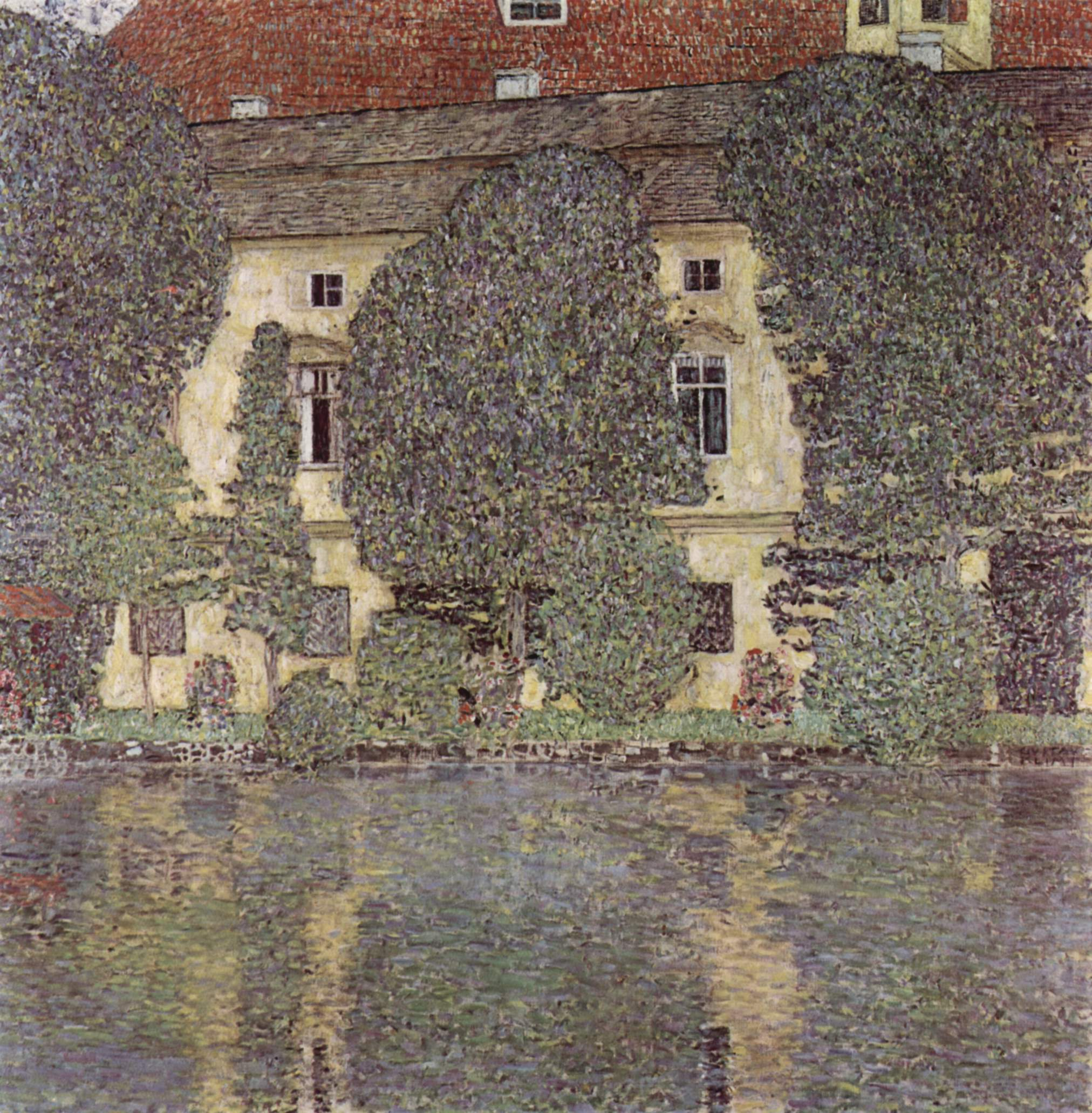
Klimt's Schloss Kammer am Attersee III (1910), which was swapped for the Portrait of Adele Bloch-Bauer I

In December 1941 Führer transferred the paintings Portrait of Adele Bloch-Bauer I and Apfelbaum I to the Galerie Belvedere in return for Schloss Kammer am Attersee III, which he then sold to Gustav Ucicky, an illegitimate son of Klimt. A note accompanying the paintings stated he was acting in accordance with Adele's will. To remove all reference to its Jewish subject matter, the gallery renamed the portrait with the German title Dame in Gold (translates as Lady in Gold).

In August 1945 Ferdinand wrote a final will that revoked all previous ones. It made no reference to the pictures, which he thought had been lost forever, but it stated that his entire estate was left to his nephew and two nieces—one of whom was Maria Altmann. Ferdinand died in Switzerland in November that year.

In 1946 the Austrian state issued an Annulment Act that declared all transactions motivated by Nazi discrimination were void; any Jews who wanted to remove artwork from Austria were forced to give some of their works to Austrian museums in order to obtain an export permit for others. The Bloch-Bauer family hired Dr Gustav Rinesh, a Viennese lawyer, to reclaim stolen artwork on their behalf. Using the records produced by Führer, he traced most of the works to the Galerie Belvedere, and Häuser in Unterach, to Führer's own private collection. Several works were returned to the Bloch-Bauer estate, but no Klimt paintings; to obtain the necessary export permits, the family were forced to let the Austrian state retain Häuser in Unterach am Attersee, Adele Bloch-Bauer I, Adele Bloch-Bauer II, and Apfelbaum I. They were also forced to relinquish any claims on Buchenwald and Schloss Kammer am Attersee III. The Galerie Belvedere based its claim of retention of the Klimt works on Adele's will.

In 1998 the Austrian government introduced the Art Restitution Act, (Note: The Bundesgesetz über die Rückgabe von Kunstgegenständen aus den Österreichischen Bundesmuseen und Sammlungen, 4 December 1998, Federal Law Gazette 1998/181.) which looked again at the question of art stolen by the Nazis. (Note: The Austrian Art Restitution Act was brought in following the seizure in the US of Portrait of Wally, which had been loaned to the Museum of Modern Art in New York from the Leopold Museum in Vienna. The painting had been stolen by the Nazis and was one of several such stolen works held by the Leopold.) The government formed a restitution committee to report on which works should be returned; government archives were opened up to research into the provenance of works held by the government. Hubertus Czernin, an Austrian investigative journalist, undertook extensive research in the newly opened archives and published a story about the theft of art by the Nazis; with the subsequent refusal of the Austrian state to return the art or to acknowledge a theft had taken place, Czernin described the situation as "a double crime".

=== Maria Altmann (2006) ===
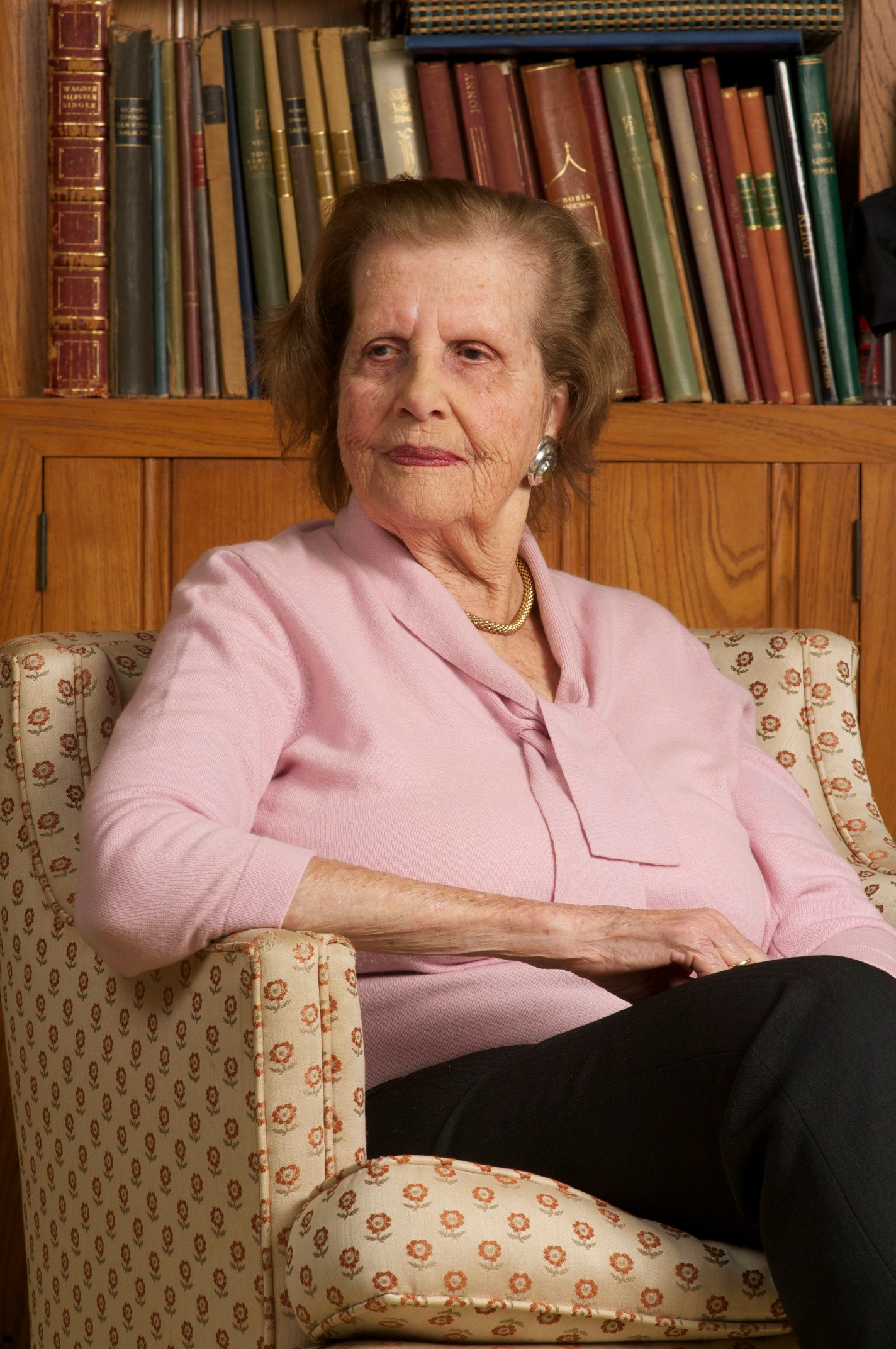
Maria Altmann, a niece of Adele and Ferdinand, in 2010

Altmann, then living in the US, hired E. Randol Schoenberg to act on her behalf. Schoenberg was the son of a woman she had been friends with since they lived in Vienna. (Note: Schoenberg was the grandson of the composer Arnold Schoenberg, who had fled to the US from Vienna in 1933.) They filed a claim with the restitution committee for the return of six paintings: Adele Bloch-Bauer I, Adele Bloch-Bauer II, Apple Tree I, Birch Forest, Häuser in Unterach am Attersee, and Amalie Zuckerkandl. The committee turned down the request, again citing Adele's will as the reason they were retaining the works. The committee's decision recommended that 16 Klimt drawings and 19 pieces of porcelain that had been held by Ferdinand and Adele and which were still at the Galerie Belvedere should be returned, as they fell outside the request of the will.

In March 2000 Altmann filed a civil claim against the Austrian government for the return of the paintings. She was informed that the cost of filing (consisting of 1.2% of the amount in question, plus a filing fee), would have meant a fee of €1.75 million. To avoid the prohibitively high costs, Altmann and Schoenberg sued the Galerie Belvedere, and the museum’s owner, the Austrian government, in the US courts. The Austrian government filed for dismissal, with arguments based on the Foreign Sovereign Immunities Act (1976). The Act granted immunity to sovereign nations except under certain conditions. Schoenberg showed that three of the conditions pertinent to the case were that Altmann's property had been taken in violation of international law; the property was in the possession of the state in question, or one of its agencies; and that the property had been used on a commercial basis in the US. Over four years of litigation followed as to whether the case could be brought against a sovereign state before it was brought before the U.S. Supreme Court in Republic of Austria v. Altmann. (Note: The case passed through the United States District Court for the Central District of California, the Ninth Circuit Court of Appeals and the Supreme Court.) In June 2004 the Supreme Court determined that the paintings had been stolen and that Austria was not immune from a claim from Altmann; the court made no comment on the current ownership of the paintings.

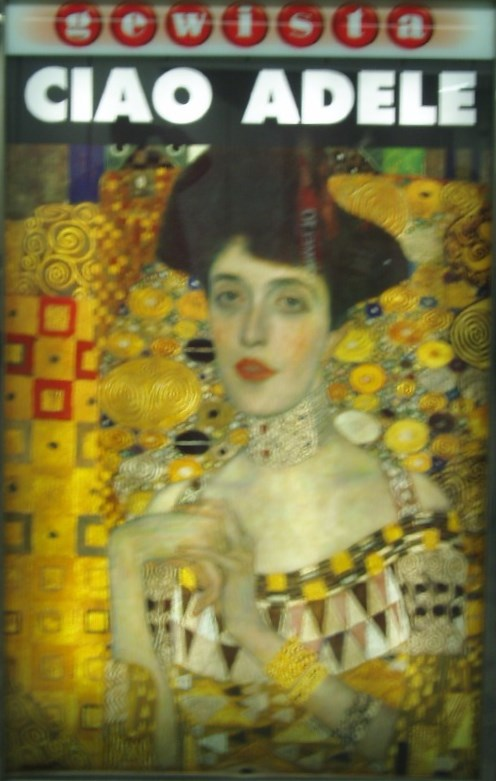
Public poster in Vienna concerning the departure of the painting from Austria

To avoid returning to the courts in what could have been lengthy litigation process, arbitration in Austria was agreed upon by both parties, although the Austrians had turned down such a move in 1999. Three arbitrators formed the panel: Andreas Nödl, Walter Rechberger, and Peter Rummel. (Note: Schoenberg selected Nödl, a Viennese barrister; the Austrian government picked Rechberger, the dean of the Faculty of Law at the University of Vienna. The two panellists agreed on Rummel, a law professor and an expert on Austrian civil law.) Schoenberg gave evidence before them in September 2005 and, in January 2006, they delivered their judgement. They stated that five of the six paintings in question should be returned to the Bloch-Bauer estate, as outlined in Ferdinand's will; only the Portrait of Amalie Zuckerkandl was to be retained by the gallery. (Note: The Portrait of Amalie Zuckerkandl moved from ownership by Ferdinand back to the Zuckerkandl family between 1938 and 1942, although details of the transaction are unclear. It was then sold for a low price to Viktoria Künstler, the director of the Neue Galerie, Vienna. On her death she left the painting to the Galerie Belvedere. Altmann claimed the transfer was through an illegal act by Führer; the Zuckerkandl heirs claimed the printing was donated freely by Ferdinand. With no clear evidence to show the transfer from Ferdinand had been coerced or illegal, the panel stated that the Restitution Act did not apply, and the painting should remain with the Galerie Belvedere.)

After the panel's decision was announced, the Galerie Belvedere ran a series of advertisements that appeared in bus stops and on underground railway platforms. The posters said "Ciao Adele", advertising the last opportunity before the painting left the country and long queues formed around the block. Although there were calls from some Austrians for the state to purchase the five paintings, the government stated that the price would be too high to justify the expense. The paintings were exported from Austria in March 2006 and exhibited together at the Los Angeles County Museum of Art from April to June that year.

=== Ronald Lauder (2006–present) ===
When Altmann was asked what she wanted to do with the paintings, she stated "I would not want any private person to buy these paintings, ... It is very meaningful to me that they are seen by anybody who wants to see them, because that would have been the wish of my aunt." However, eventually all paintings except for Portrait of Adele Bloch-Bauer I ended up in private collections.

In June 2006 the Portrait of Adele Bloch-Bauer I was sold to Ronald Lauder for US$135 million for his public art museum, at the time a record price for a painting. Eileen Kinsella, the editor of ARTnews, considered the high price was due to several factors, particularly the painting's provenance, the increasing demand for Austrian Expressionism, rising prices in the art world and "Lauder's passion for and pursuit of this particular work". Lauder placed the work in the Neue Galerie, the New York–based gallery he co-founded. The painting has been on display at the location since.

In November 2006 the remaining four Klimt paintings were sold at Christie's auction house. Adele Bloch-Bauer II sold for US$87.9 million, Apfelbaum I for US$33 million, Buchenwald for US$40.3 million and Häuser in Unterach am Attersee for US$31 million. All went to private collections.

Michael Kimmelman, the chief art critic for The New York Times, was critical of the sale, and wrote that "A story about justice and redemption after the Holocaust has devolved into yet another tale of the crazy, intoxicating art market." Altmann said of the sale that it was not practical for her, or her relatives who were also part of the estate, to retain any of the paintings.

Altmann died in February 2011, aged 94. Schoenberg, who had worked on a 40% conditional fee throughout, received US$54 million for the sale of Portrait of Adele Bloch-Bauer I, and US$55 million for the sale of the remaining four paintings. After he donated over US$7 million for the building of the new premises of the Los Angeles Museum of the Holocaust, he said that he had "tried to do good things with the money". He subsequently specialised in the restitution of artwork plundered by the Nazis.

== Legacy ==
The history of the Portrait of Adele Bloch-Bauer I and the other paintings taken from the Bloch-Bauers has been recounted in three documentary films, Stealing Klimt (2007), The Rape of Europa (2007) and Adele's Wish (2008).

The painting's history is described in the 2012 book The Lady in Gold: The Extraordinary Tale of Gustav Klimt's Masterpiece, Portrait of Adele Bloch-Bauer, by the journalist Anne-Marie O'Connor.

The history, as well as other stories of other stolen art, is told by Melissa Müller and Monika Tatzkow in Lost Lives, Lost Art: Jewish Collectors, Nazi Art Theft, and the Quest for Justice, published in 2010.

The portrait is featured in the memoir of Gregor Collins, The Accidental Caregiver, about his unusual bond with Adele's niece Maria Altmann, published in August 2012.

In 2015 Altmann's story was dramatised for the film Woman in Gold starring Helen Mirren as Maria and Ryan Reynolds as Schoenberg. The painting of Adele – Maria's aunt – was the centrepiece for the story.

The story of Adele Bloch-Bauer and Maria Altmann formed the basis for the 2017 novel Stolen Beauty by Laurie Lico Albanese.

Elements of the portrait have been noted by art critics to have influenced the painting First Lady Michelle Obama, by Amy Sherald in 2018.

== See also ==
- List of paintings by Gustav Klimt

== Notes and references ==
=== Sources ===
==== Books ====
- Dean, Catherine (1996). Klimt. London: Phaidon Press. ISBN 978-0-7148-3377-4.
- Fliedl, Gottfried (1989). Gustav Klimt. Translated by Beyer, Hugh. Cologne: Benedikt Taschen. ISBN 978-3-8228-0290-8.
- Frodl, Gerbert (1992). Klimt. Translated by Campbell, Alexandra. London: Barrie & Jenkins. ISBN 978-0-7126-5168-4.
- Grunenberg, Christoph; Natter, Tobias Günter; Asenbaum, Paul (2008). Gustav Klimt: Painting, Design and Modern Life. Liverpool: Tate. ISBN 978-1-85437-735-7.
- Kenny, Shannon L. (2011). Gold: A Cultural Encyclopedia: A Cultural Encyclopedia. Santa Barbara, CA: ABC-CLIO. ISBN 978-0-313-38431-8.
- Müller, Melissa; Tatzkow, Monica (2010). Lost Lives, Lost Art: Jewish Collectors, Nazi Art Theft, and the Quest for Justice. New York: The Vendome Press. ISBN 978-0-86565-263-7.
- Nebehay, Christian M. (1994). Gustav Klimt. New York: Harry N. Abrams. ISBN 978-0-8109-3510-5.
- Nelson, Robert S. (2015). "Modernism's Byzantium Byzantium's Modernism". In Betancourt, Roland; Taroutina, Maria (eds.). Byzantium/Modernism: The Byzantine as Method in Modernity. Leiden: Brill. ISBN 978-90-04-30001-9.
- Néret, Gilles (2005). Klimt. Cologne: Taschen. ISBN 978-3-8228-5980-3.
- O'Connor, Anne-Marie (2015). The Lady in Gold: The Extraordinary Tale of Gustav Klimt's Masterpiece, Bloch-Bauer. New York: Vintage Books. ISBN 978-1-1018-7312-0.
- Partsch, Susanna (2006). Gustav Klimt: Painter of Women. Munich: Prestel. ISBN 978-3-7913-3282-6.
- Rogoyska, Jane; Bade, Patrick (2012). Gustav Klimt. New York: Parkstone International. ISBN 978-1-78042-729-4.
- Schwartz, Agata (2010). Gender and Modernity in Central Europe: The Austro-Hungarian Monarchy and Its Legacy. Ottawa, ON: University of Ottawa Press. ISBN 978-0-7766-0726-9.
- Shapira, Elana (2016). Style and Seduction: Jewish Patrons, Architecture, and Design in Fin de Siècle Vienna. Lebanon, NH: Brandeis University Press. ISBN 978-1-61168-969-3.
- Thompson, Don (2008). The $12 Million Stuffed Shark: The Curious Economics of Contemporary Art. London: Aurum Press. ISBN 978-1-8451-3302-3.
- Whitford, Frank (1990). Klimt. London: Thames and Hudson. ISBN 978-0-5002-0246-3.

==== Journals and newspapers ====
- Clegg, Elizabeth (December 2008). "Klimt and the 1908 Kunstschau". The Burlington Magazine. 150 (1269): 852–853. JSTOR 40480009.
- Florman, Lisa (June 1990). "Gustav Klimt and the Precedent of Ancient Greece". The Art Bulletin. 72 (2): 310–326. doi:10.2307/3045736. JSTOR 3045736.
- Gallagher, Paul (20 October 2013). "'Nazi loot' is in major National Gallery show; Specialist in tracking of stolen artworks says curators must not return Klimt portrait to Austria". The Independent on Sunday. p. 10.
- Green, Tyler (28 September 2006). "This is our Mona Lisa". Fortune. Archived from the original on 24 January 2008.
- Haithman, Diane; Reynolds, Christopher (17 January 2006). "Court Awards Nazi-Looted Artworks to L.A. Woman". Los Angeles Times.
- Johnson, Julle M. (2003). "Athena Goes to the Prater: Parodying Ancients and Moderns at the Vienna Secession". Oxford Art Journal. 26 (2): 49–69. doi:10.1093/oxartj/26.2.47. JSTOR 3600390.
- Kimmelman, Michael (19 September 2006). "Klimts Go to Market; Museums Hold Their Breath". New York Times.
- Kinsella, Eileen (January 2007). "Gold rush" (PDF). ARTnews: 110–125.
- Kirsta, Alix (10 July 2006). "Glittering Prize". The Daily Telegraph.
- McNay, Michael (12 February 2011). "Obituary: Maria Altmann". The Guardian. p. 51.
- Morrison, Patt (17 March 2012). "Patt Morrison Asks: E. Randol Schoenberg—for the gold Klimt". Los Angeles Times. Archived from the original on 21 March 2012.
- Muchnic, Suzanne (16 March 2006). "LACMA to show Klimts". Los Angeles Times. p. E 4.
- Rothstein, Edward (23 March 2011). "Bearing Witness Beyond the Witnesses". New York Times.
- Seaman, Donna (1 February 2012). "The Lady in Gold: The Extraordinary Tale of Gustav Klimt's Masterpiece, Portrait of Adele Block-Bauer". Booklist. 108 (11): 16. ISSN 0006-7385.
- Shapiro, Herbert E. (1 November 2010). "Lost Lives, Lost Art: Jewish Collectors, Nazi Art Theft, and the Quest for Justice". Library Journal Reviews. 135 (18): 60.
- Thompson, Jan (1971). "The Role of Woman in the Iconography of Art Nouveau". Art Journal. 31 (2): 158–167. doi:10.1080/00043249.1972.10792994. JSTOR 775570.
- "United States (US) Court of Appeals for the Ninth Circuit: Altmann V. Republic of Austria". International Legal Materials. 42 (1). American Society of International Law: 216–229. January 2003. doi:10.1017/S0020782900009621. JSTOR 20694339. S2CID 232252256.
- Vogel, Carol (19 June 2006). "Lauder Pays $135 Million, a Record, for a Klimt Portrait". New York Times.
- Williams, Maxwell (9 February 2017). "The Gustav Klimt Painting Oprah Reportedly Sold for $150M Has Quite a Story". The Hollywood Reporter.

==== Internet and television media ====
- "Arbitral Award – 5 Klimt paintings Maria V. Altmann and others v. Republic of Austria, 15 January 2004" (PDF). University of Geneva. 15 January 2004.
- Bloch-Bauer, Adele (1923). "Testament vom 19.1.1923 von Adele Bloch-Bauer" (PDF). University of Geneva.
- Contel, Raphael; Soldan, Giulia; Chechi, Alessandro. "Portrait of Wally – United States and Estate of Lea Bondi and Leopold Museum". University of Geneva.
- Donovan, Diane (1 October 2012). "Donovan's Bookshelf; Book Review". MBR Bookwatch.
- "Gustav Klimt: Adele Bloch-Bauer". Grove Art Online. Oxford University Press.(subscription required)
- "Gustav Klimt and Adele Bloch-Bauer: The Woman in Gold". Neue Galerie.
- "Gustav Klimt: Five Paintings from the Collection of Ferdinand and Adele Bloch-Bauer". Los Angeles County Museum of Art. 2006.
- "Neue Galerie New York Agrees to Acquire Spectacular Klimt Painting, Adele Bloch-Bauer I". Neue Galerie. 19 June 2006. Archived from the original on 18 October 2017.
- "The Woman in Gold: Historical Timeline" (PDF). Neue Galerie. Archived from the original (PDF) on 11 May 2016.
- "New York: Staged Reading: The Accidental Caregiver (presented by the ACF New York)". Embassy of Austria in Washington. Archived from the original on 14 March 2017.
- "Portrait of Adele Bloch-Bauer". Neue Galerie. Archived from the original on 1 October 2018.
- Renold, Carolin; Chechi, Alessandro; Bandle, Anne Laure; Renold, Marc-André. "Six Klimt paintings – Maria Altmann and Austria". University of Geneva.
- "Republic of Austria v. Altmann 541 U.S. 677 (2004)". US Supreme Court.
- Schoenberg, E. Randol (9 June 2014). The Recovery of Nazi-Looted Art: The Bloch-Bauer Klimt Paintings (Video). University of California. Archived from the original on 21 December 2021.
- Shapira, Elana (1 March 2009). "Adele Bloch-Bauer". Jewish Women: A Comprehensive Historical Encyclopedia. Jewish Women's Archive.
- "Stolen Beauty by Laurie Lico Albanese". Kirkus Reviews.
- Vergo, Peter. "Klimt, Gustav". Grove Art Online. Oxford University Press.(subscription required)
- Wigley, Samuel (20 July 2015). "British Films at Berlin 2015". British Film Institute.
