= Adele Bloch-Bauer =

Austro-Hungarian socialite (1881–1925)

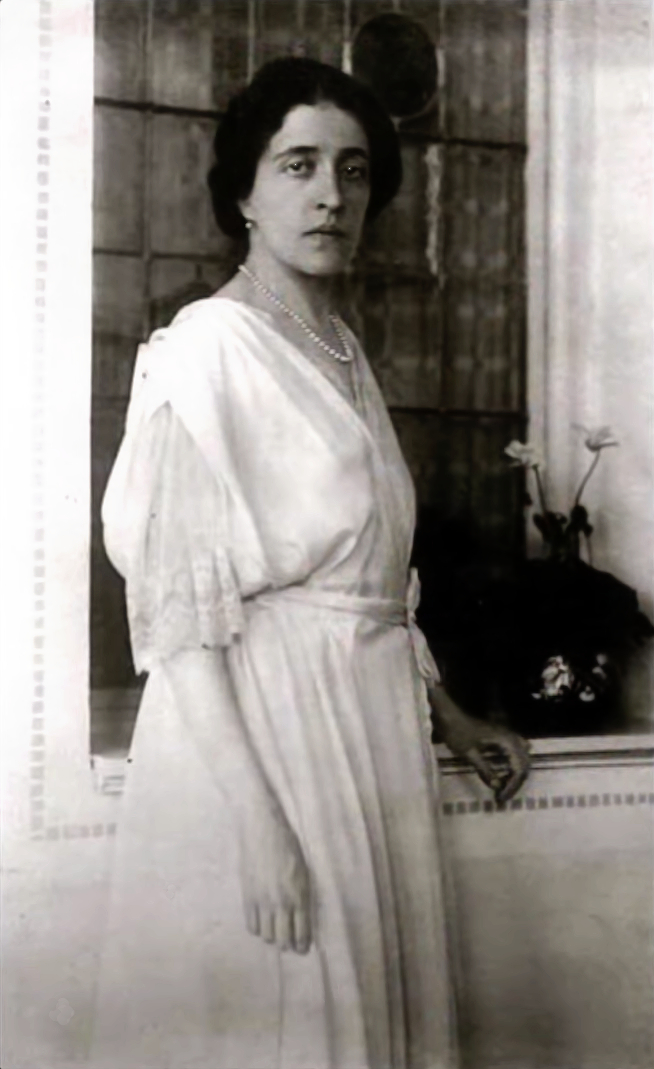
- Adele Bloch-Bauer in 1920
- Born: Adele Bauer; August 9, 1881; Vienna, Austria-Hungary
- Died: January 24, 1925 (aged 43)
- Occupations: Socialite, arts patron
- Spouse: Ferdinand Bloch-Bauer (m. 1899)
- Relatives: Maria Altmann (niece)

Adele Bloch-Bauer (née Bauer; August 9, 1881 – January 24, 1925) was a Viennese socialite, salon hostess, and patron of the arts from Austria-Hungary, married to sugar industrialist Ferdinand Bloch-Bauer. A Jewish woman, she is most well known for being the subject of two of artist Gustav Klimt's paintings: Portrait of Adele Bloch-Bauer I and Portrait of Adele Bloch-Bauer II, and the fate of the paintings during and after the Nazi Holocaust. She has been called "the Austrian Mona Lisa."

== Biography ==
Adele Bauer was born in Vienna, Austria-Hungary, on August 9, 1881, to Moritz and Jeannette (née Honig) Bauer. Her father was a railway and bank director.

She met her future husband, Ferdinand Bloch, at the wedding of her sister Therese to Ferdinand's brother Gustav Bloch in 1898. Adele and Ferdinand became engaged the next year, followed by marriage in Vienna's Stadttempel on December 19, 1899. Ferdinand was a wealthy businessman who owned a sugar refinery in Bruck an der Mur, Austria.

In 1903, he commissioned the artist Gustav Klimt to paint a portrait of his wife, which was completed in 1907 and became the Portrait of Adele Bloch-Bauer I. Kimberly Bradley of the BBC has written that the portrait transformed Bloch-Bauer into an "icon". In 1912, Bloch-Bauer again sat for Klimt for a portrait, which became the Portrait of Adele Bloch-Bauer II.

In sitting for Klimt twice, she is the only verified person to be painted by the artist twice in full length. Bloch-Bauer became a Viennese socialite, regularly hosting artists and authors in her salon. Among the many people she hosted were conductors Gustav Mahler and Richard Strauss. She also socialized with royalty, and high nobility including Prince Adolph Schwarzenberg.

Maria Altmann, the niece of Bloch-Bauer, stated:

[Bloch-Bauer was a] rather cold, intellectual woman who was very politically aware and became a socialist. She wasn't happy. It was an arranged marriage but she was childless, after two miscarriages and the death of a baby. I remember her as extremely elegant, tall, dark and thin. She always wore a slinky white dress and used a long, gold cigarette holder.

In 1925, Bloch-Bauer died of meningitis.

== Paintings ==
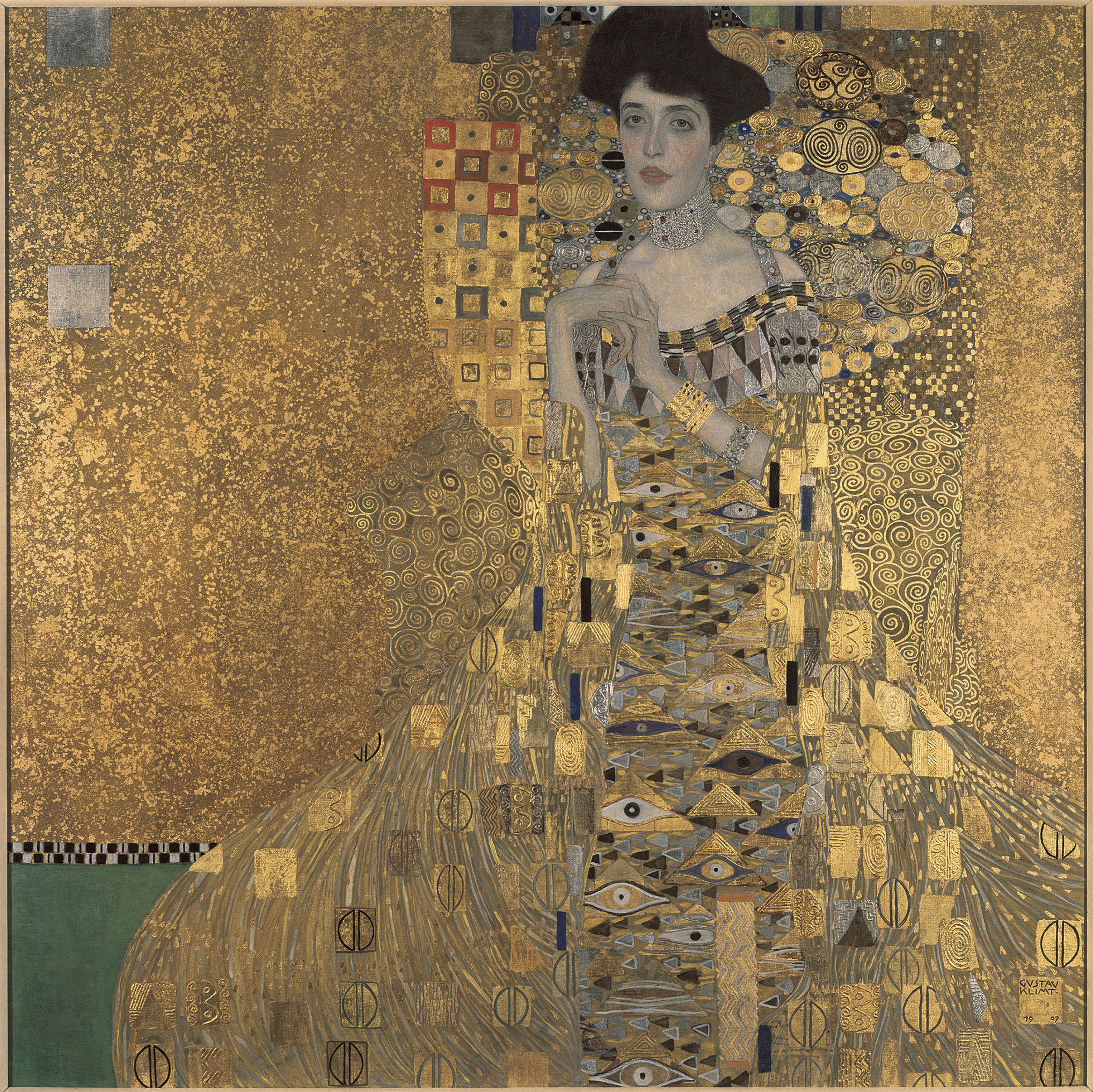
Portrait of Adele Bloch-Bauer I, painted in 1907. The movie Woman in Gold is named after this painting.

Klimt painted Bloch-Bauer at least twice. The first portrait was a gift to Adele's parents. Some artists also think Adele Bloch-Bauer might be the woman in The Kiss and Judith I.

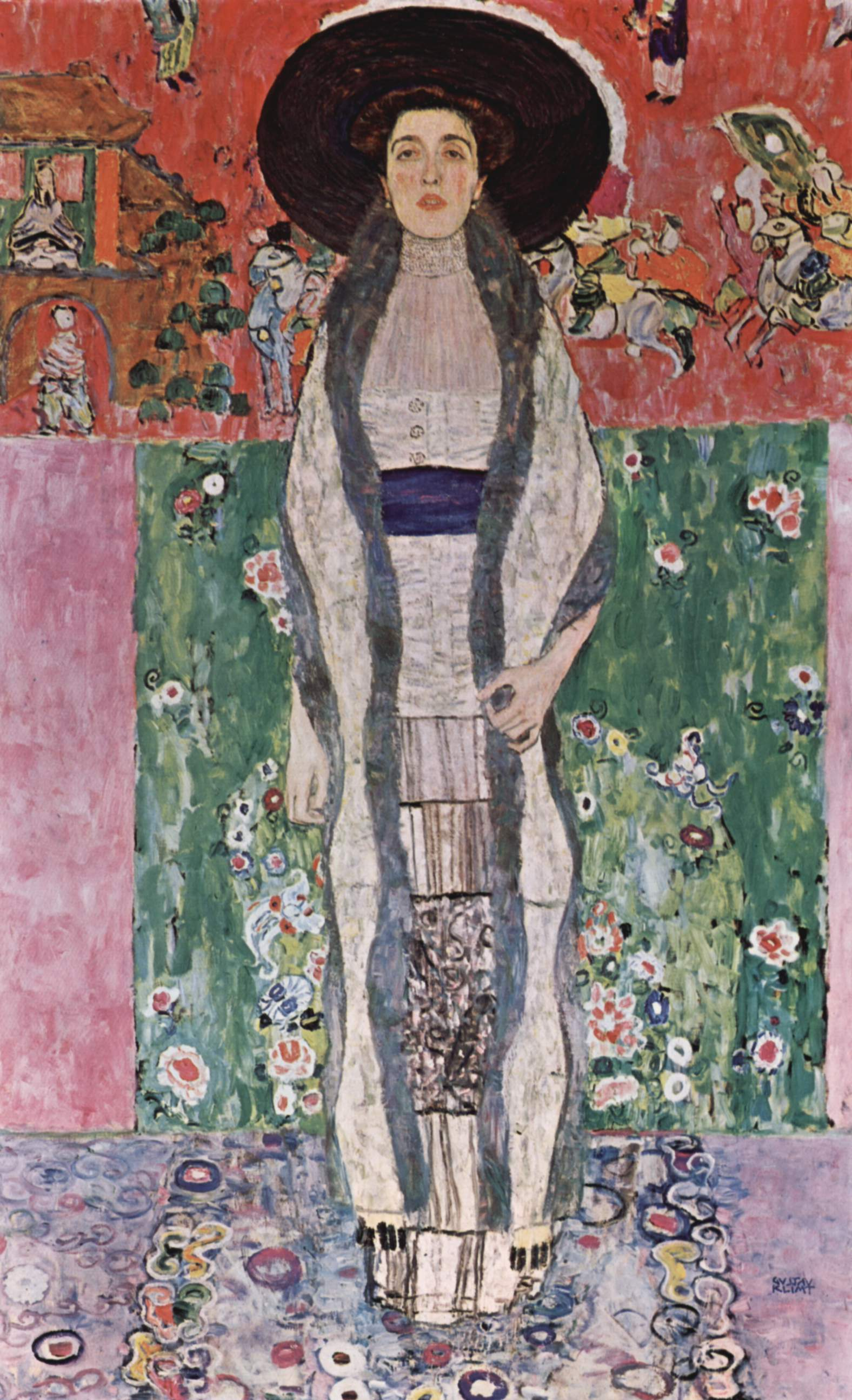
Portrait of Adele Bloch-Bauer II, painted in 1912.

== Legal case ==
During World War II, the Nazis stole Portrait of Adele Bloch-Bauer I from Bloch-Bauer's family. It ended up in the Belvedere Gallery.

In Republic of Austria v. Altmann in 2004, Adele Bloch-Bauer's niece, Maria Altmann, tried to get the painting back from the Belvedere Gallery. The Supreme Court of the United States said the painting was Altmann's. Because Altmann could not pay for insurance and storage, she sold the painting to Ronald Lauder to put in the Neue Gallery in New York City.

== Legacy ==
Bloch-Bauer was the subject of the 2009 children's book Adorable Adele by Peter Stephan Jungk.

In 2016, the city of Vienna named a street, Bloch-Bauer Promenade, after her and her husband.

== In popular culture ==
The 2015 documentary film Adele's Wish recounts the Maria Altmann legal battle to recover five Gustav Klimt paintings stolen by the Nazis in 1938.

The 2015 film Woman in Gold is also about Maria Altmann's case. Adele Bloch-Bauer is shown in flashbacks, portrayed by Antje Traue.

In the German-Italian children's series Mia and Me (2012), the teenager Mia is transported into a world of elves. The king and queen of the elves wear dresses that very closely resemble Adele's in the Woman in Gold painting.

First-hand anecdotes of Adele by her niece Maria Altmann appear throughout 2012's The Accidental Caregiver, a memoir written by her millennial caregiver, about Altmann's upbringing in Vienna.
