= Republic of Austria v. Altmann =

2004 United States Supreme Court case

- Supreme Court of the United States

Argued February 24, 2004 Decided June 7, 2004
- Full case name: Republic of Austria et al. v. Altmann
- Citations: 541 U.S. 677 (more) 124 S. Ct. 2240; 159 L. Ed. 2d 1; 2004 U.S. LEXIS 4030

Case history
- Prior: Motion to dismiss denied, Altmann v. Republic of Austria, 142 F. Supp. 2d 1187 (C.D. Cal. 2001); Affirmed and remanded, 317 F.3d 954 (9th Cir. 2002); Rehearing en banc denied, opinion amended, 327 F.3d 1246 (9th Cir. 2003); Stay granted, Republic of Austria v. Altmann, 538 U.S. 1029 (2003); Cert. granted, 539 U.S. 987 (2003).
- Subsequent: Remanded, Altmann v. Republic of Austria, 377 F.3d 1105 (9th Cir. 2004); Motion to dismiss denied, 335 F. Supp. 2d 1066 (C.D. Cal. 2004).

Holding
- The Foreign Sovereign Immunities Act applies retroactively.

Court membership
- Chief Justice William Rehnquist Associate Justices John P. Stevens · Sandra Day O'Connor; Antonin Scalia · Anthony Kennedy; David Souter · Clarence Thomas; Ruth Bader Ginsburg · Stephen Breyer

Case opinions
- Majority: Stevens, joined by O'Connor, Scalia, Souter, Ginsburg, Breyer
- Concurrence: Scalia
- Concurrence: Breyer, joined by Souter
- Dissent: Kennedy, joined by Rehnquist, Thomas

Republic of Austria v. Altmann, 541 U.S. 677 (2004), was a case in which the Supreme Court of the United States held that the Foreign Sovereign Immunities Act, or FSIA, applies retroactively to acts prior to its enactment in 1976.

== Decision ==
The case turned on the "anti-retroactivity doctrine", which is a doctrine that holds that courts should not construe a statute to apply retroactively (to apply to situations that arose before it was enacted) unless there is a clear statutory intent that it should do so. This means that, regarding lawsuits filed after its enactment, the FSIA standards of sovereign immunity and its exceptions apply even to conduct that took place before 1976. Since the intent of FSIA was the codification of already existing well settled standards of international law, Austria was deemed not immune from litigation, for acts that first arose from criminal conduct during World War II.

The result of this case for the plaintiff, Maria Altmann, was that she was authorized to proceed with a civil action against Austria in a U.S. federal district court for recovery of five paintings stolen by the Nazis from her relatives and then housed in Österreichische Galerie Belvedere, an Austrian governmental museum. As the Supreme Court noted in its decision, Altmann had already tried suing the museum before in Austria, but was forced to voluntarily dismiss her case because of Austria's rule that court costs are proportional to the amount in controversy (in this case, the enormous monetary value of the paintings). Under Austrian law, the filing fee for such a lawsuit is determined as a percentage of the recoverable amount. At the time, the five paintings were estimated to be worth approximately US$135 million, making the filing fee over US$1.5 million. Although the Austrian courts later reduced this amount to US$350,000, this was still too much for Altmann, and she dropped her case in the Austrian court system.

The high court remanded the case for trial in the Los Angeles district court. Back in the district court, both parties agreed to arbitration in Austria in 2005, which in turn ruled in favor of Altmann on 16 January 2006.

== Case ==
Adele Bloch-Bauer, the subject of two of the paintings, had written in her last will:

German: "Meine 2 Porträts und 4 Landschaften von Gustav Klimt, bitte ich meinen Ehegatten nach seinem Tode der österr. Staats-Galerie in Wien, die mir gehörende Wiener und Jungfer."

"I ask my husband, upon his death, bequeath my 2 portraits and the 4 landscapes by Gustav Klimt to the Austrian State Gallery in Vienna, namely Wiener ('Viennese') and Jungfer ('Maiden'), which belong to me."

Ferdinand Bloch-Bauer signed a statement acknowledging Adele's wish in her last will. He also donated one of the landscape paintings to the Belvedere Gallery in Vienna in 1936. The Austrian arbitration determined that Adele was probably never the legal owner of the paintings. Rather, it viewed it as more likely that Ferdinand Bloch-Bauer was their legal owner and that in turn his heirs, including Altmann, were the rightful owners.

== Aftermath ==
=== Reactions ===
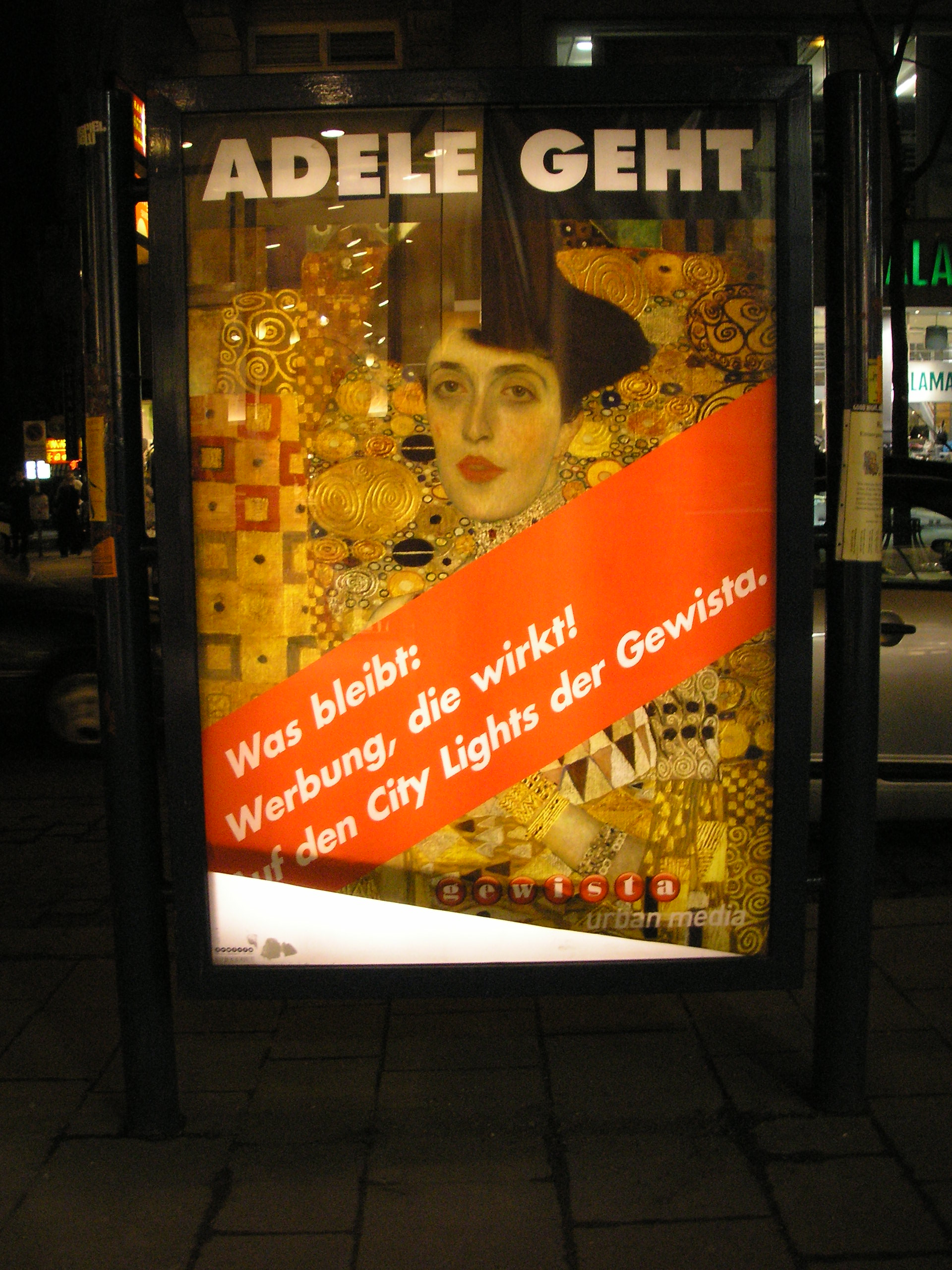
Poster in Vienna, bidding goodbye to the painting Adele Bloch-Bauer.

The ruling in favor of Maria Altmann came as a great shock to the Austrian public and the government. The loss of the paintings was regarded in Austria as a loss of national treasure. She had attempted earlier to come to some mutual agreement in 1999; however, the government repeatedly ignored her proposals. Maria Altmann told the government that time had run out, and there would be no deal from her side anymore. The Austrian government declined to accept a condition of the arbitration which would have allowed it preferentially to purchase the paintings at an attested market price. The paintings left Austria in March 2006 and were returned to Altmann. Consequently, the Austrian government received criticism from the opposition parties for its failure to secure a deal with Altmann at an earlier stage. The city of Vienna also asserted that buying back the paintings was a "moral duty".

=== Auction ===
When Altmann was asked what she wanted to do with the paintings, she stated "I would not want any private person to buy these paintings, ... It is very meaningful to me that they are seen by anybody who wants to see them, because that would have been the wish of my aunt." However, eventually all paintings except for Portrait of Adele Bloch-Bauer I ended up in private collections.

Just months after the Austrian government finally returned Ms. Altmann's family's heirlooms to her, she consigned the Klimts to the auction house Christie's, to be sold on her behalf. Portrait of Adele Bloch-Bauer I sold for allegedly US$135 million in a private sale, the others in auction, e.g., Adele Bloch-Bauer II for US$88 million, with the five paintings fetching a total of over US$327 million. (Note: Figure is calculated as $135 million for Adele I plus $192.7 million for the other four.)

Altmann died in February 2011, aged 94. Her lawyer, E. Randol Schoenberg, who had worked on a 40% conditional fee throughout, received US$54 million for the sale of Portrait of Adele Bloch-Bauer I, and US$55 million for the sale of the remaining four paintings. After he donated over US$7 million for the building of the new premises of the Los Angeles Museum of the Holocaust, he said that he had "tried to do good things with the money". He subsequently specialised in the restitution of artwork plundered by the Nazis.

== Gallery of the Klimts ==
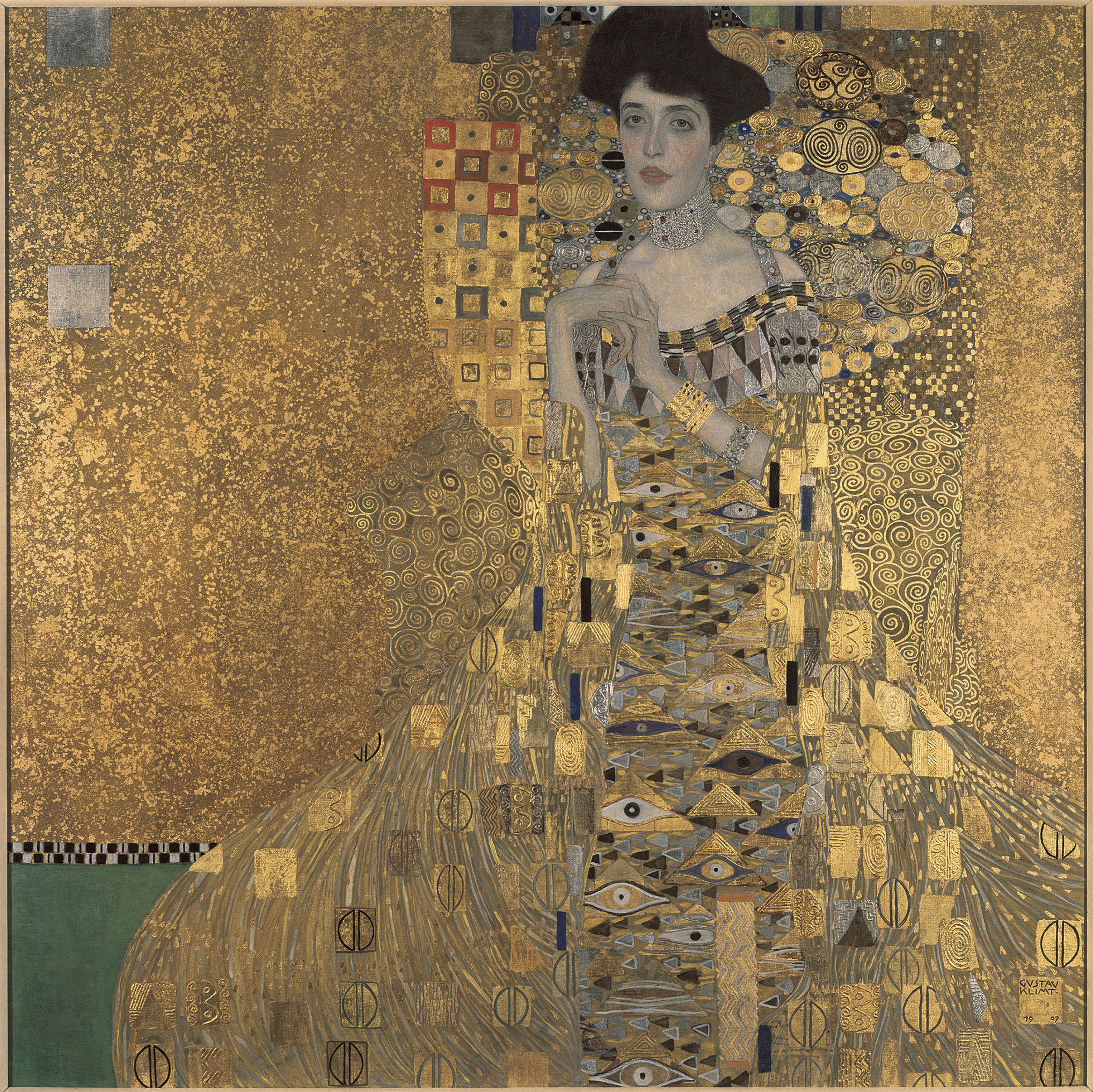
Portrait of Adele Bloch-Bauer I, 1907

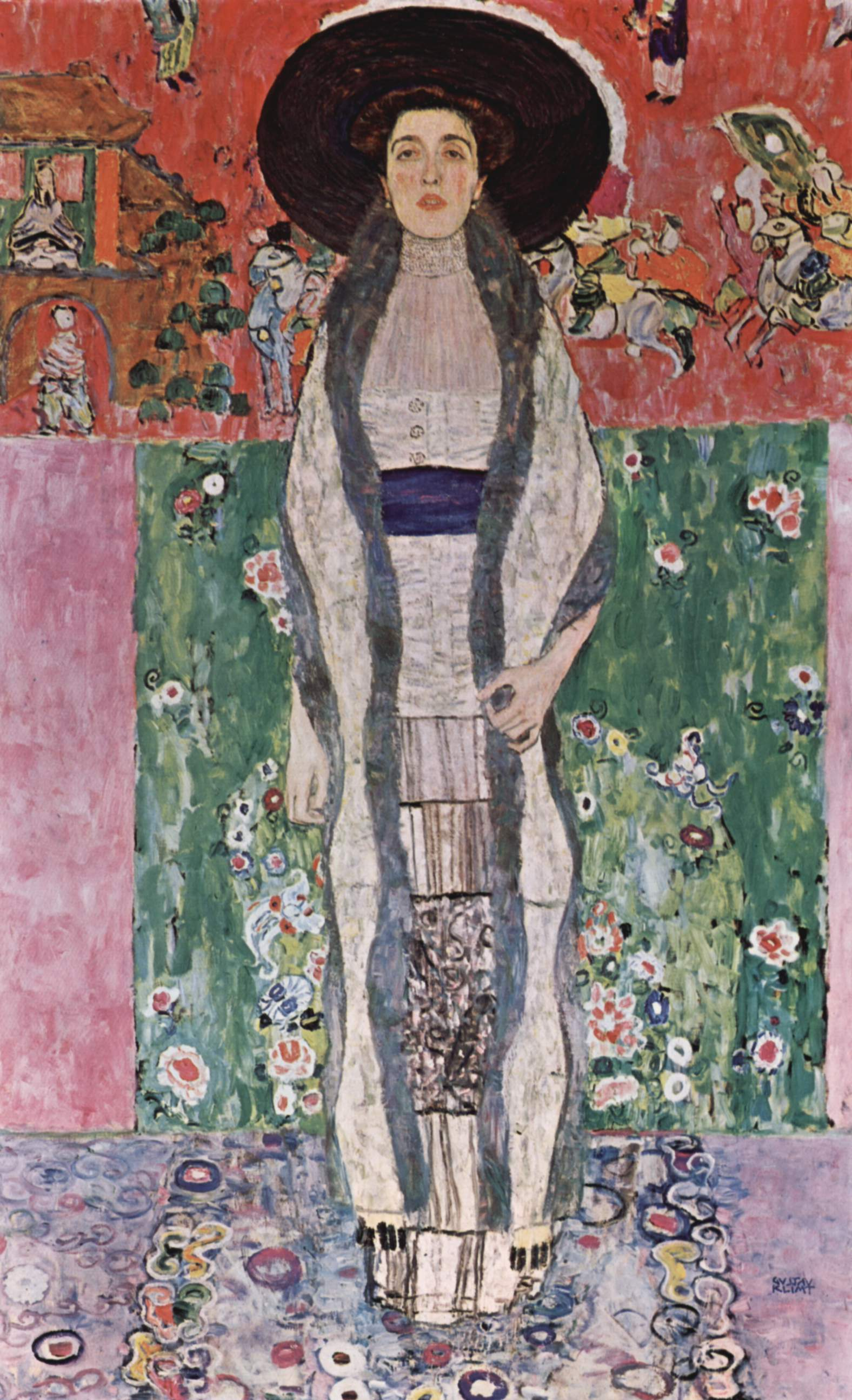
Adele Bloch-Bauer II, 1912

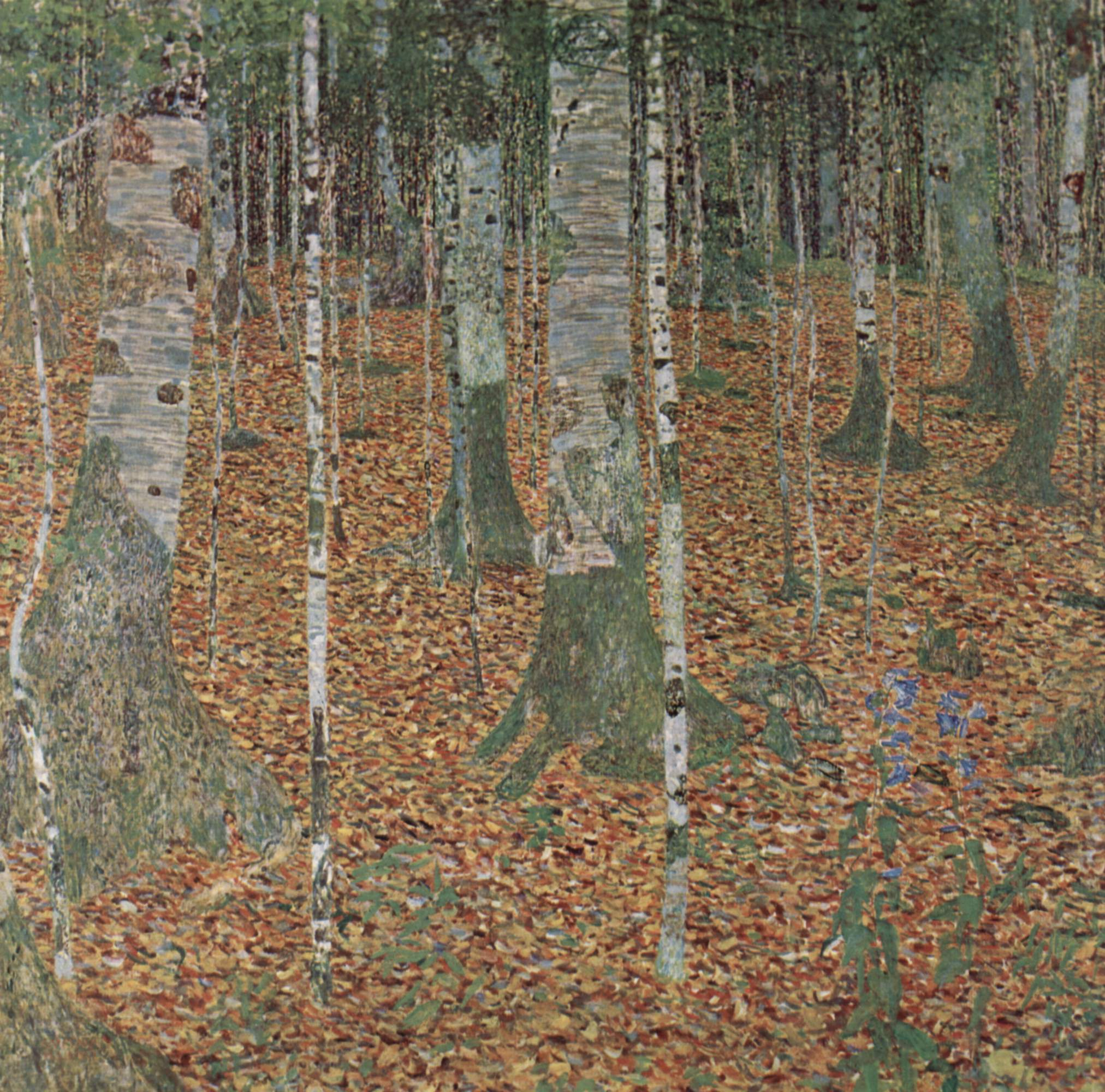
Birch Forest, 1903

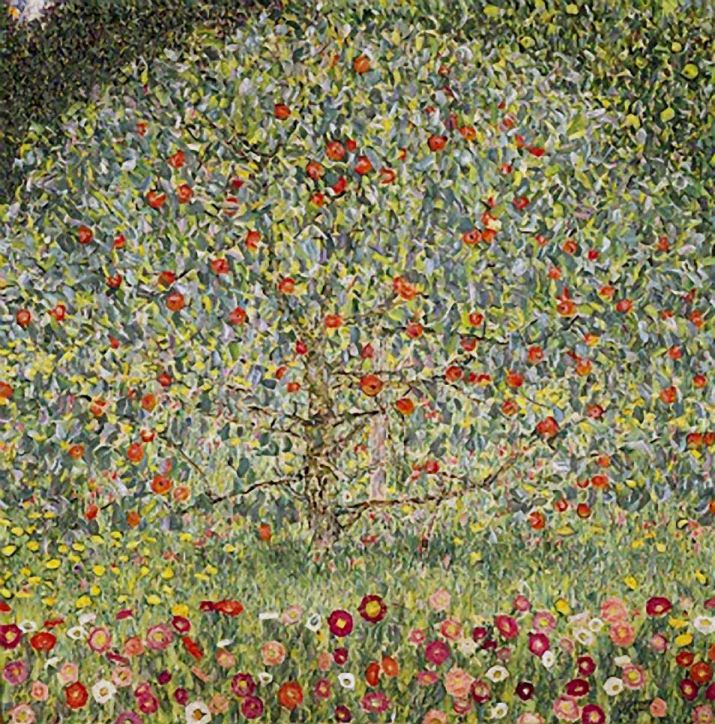
Apple Tree I, 1912

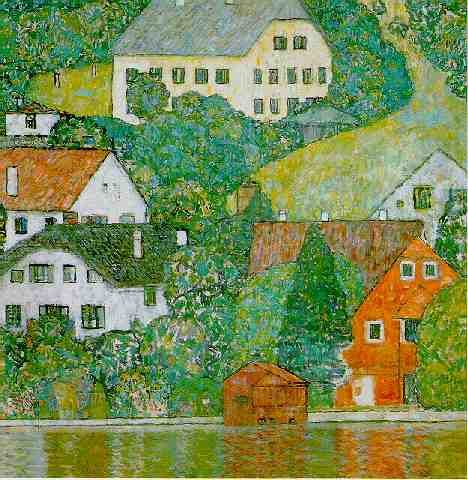
Häuser in Unterach am Attersee, 1916

== In popular media ==
Maria Altmann's story has been recounted in three documentary films. Stealing Klimt, which was released in 2007, featured interviews with Altmann and others who were closely involved with the story. Adele's Wish by filmmaker Terrence Turner, who is the husband of Altmann's great-niece, was released in 2008, and features interviews with Altmann, Schoenberg, and leading experts from around the world. The piece was also featured in the 2006 documentary The Rape of Europa, which dealt with the massive theft of art in Europe by the Nazi Government during World War II.

Altmann is portrayed by Helen Mirren, and Schoenberg by Ryan Reynolds in the 2015 film Woman in Gold, chronicling Altmann's nearly decade-long struggle to recover the Klimt paintings.

== See also ==
- List of United States Supreme Court cases, volume 541
- Art repatriation
- National Fund of the Republic of Austria for Victims of National Socialism
- Alperin v. Vatican Bank
- Woman in Gold (film)

== Sources ==
- Czernin, Hubertus (2006), Die Fälschung: Der Fall Bloch-Bauer und das Werk Gustav Klimts (in German), Vienna: Czernin Verlag, ISBN 3-7076-0000-9.
