= Marlena Fejzo =

American medical scientist

Marlena Schoenberg Fejzo (born February 20, 1968) is an American medical scientist and professor. She researches women's health, including hyperemesis gravidarum.

== Education ==
She received her undergraduate degree from Brown University in Applied Math in 1989 and a Ph.D. in Genetics from Harvard University in 1995. From 2000-2020, while working on the side on Hyperemesis Gravidarum due to her own personal experience with the condition, she worked on ovarian cancer in the department of Medicine at the University of California, Los Angeles, in the laboratory of Dennis J. Slamon. Currently she is research faculty at the University of Southern California, Keck School of Medicine.

== Research ==
She has published peer-reviewed scientific articles on many diseases of women including ovarian cancer, breast cancer, multiple sclerosis, and discovered the first genes for uterine fibroids, nausea and vomiting of pregnancy, and hyperemesis gravidarum. In 2018, Fejzo, in collaboration with personal genetics company 23andMe, Inc, published the first link between nausea and vomiting of pregnancy and the placenta, appetite, and vomiting hormone GDF15 as well as other genes. In 2022, she published the first mutation in GDF15 associated with Hyperemesis Gravidarum (HG), solidifying the role of GDF15 as a predisposing factor for HG. In December, 2023, in collaboration with Stephen O'Rahilly and a team of international researchers, Fejzo published a study that identified the mechanism involved in nausea and vomiting of pregnancy and HG. The study identified ways to potentially prevent and treat both nausea and vomiting in pregnancy (common misnomer "morning sickness") and HG. Fejzo is a Research Advisor and Board Member of the Hyperemesis Education and Research Foundation.

== Recognition ==
In 2023 Fejzo was named one of ten fiercest women in life sciences by Fierce Pharma and in 2024 was selected as a TIME Women of the year, a Time100 Health honoree, and a National NOW awardee. In 2025, Fejzo was awarded the BioInnovation Institute & Science Translational Medicine Prize for Innovations in Women’s Health.

== Personal life ==
Fejzo is the granddaughter of the Austrian composers Arnold Schoenberg and Eric Zeisl, and the sister of the attorney E. Randol Schoenberg. She is the great-granddaughter of the Austrian physician and endocrinologist Rudolf Rafael Kolisch. Fejzo has three children.
