= Klimt (disambiguation) =

Gustav Klimt (1862–1918) was an Austrian painter.

Klimt may also refer to:

- Ernst Klimt, younger brother of Gustav Klimt
- Klimt (film), a 2006 film about Gustav Klimt
- Klimt University of Vienna Ceiling Paintings
- Klimt 1918, Italian band
- Stealing Klimt, a 2007 documentary film on five stolen Klimt paintings
- 16445 Klimt, a minor planet

== See also ==
- Hilma af Klint, Swedish artist
- Baltic Klint, a landform on the Baltic Sea
