= Matthew Mishory =

Film director (b. 1982)

- Born: July 17, 1982 (age 44); Santa Monica, California, U.S.
- Education: University of California, Santa Barbara
- Occupation: Film director

Matthew Mishory is an American film director of Israeli descent. He has directed both narrative and documentary films and was named a "rising talent" by Variety Magazine in 2013. His award-winning 2009 film, Delphinium, about Derek Jarman, was preserved by the British Film Institute in its National Film Archive.

== Early life and education ==
Mishory was born on July 17, 1982, in Santa Monica, California, and grew up in Los Angeles, California. He is a citizen of the United States and Israel. He studied film at the University of California, Santa Barbara where he received his Bachelor of Arts in 2004.

== Career ==
Mishory's 2009 short film, Delphinium, about the legendary English artist Derek Jarman, was screened at dozens of film festivals before being permanently installed in the British Film Institute's National Film Archive. The film was subsequently re-released in the UK by the BFI as part of the year-long Jarman 2014 celebration. In 2017, it was presented by the Tate Britain Museum in London. The film's score was composed by Siouxsie and the Banshees co-founder Steven Severin.

His feature film debut, the 35 mm black-and-white Joshua Tree, 1951: A Portrait of James Dean, debuted at the Transilvania International Film Festival on June 10, 2012, and was released theatrically in the United States, the UK, and Germany, and received a Jury Prize at the 2012 Image+Nation Montreal Film Festival. Writing for Film International, Robert Kenneth Dator wrote, "Matthew Mishory has managed to capture an austere beauty of a kind little known by all but the likes of Baudelaire.”

Mishory's second feature film, the documentary Absent, was filmed in remote rural Moldova. It concerns the village of Mărculeşti, site of a horrible atrocity in 1941 in which all of the village's Jews were massacred by the Romanian army.

The film introduces the current residents of Mărculeşti, who seem to be unaware (or unwilling to discuss) what happened. Mishory's grandparents lived in the village, escaping to Israel just before the start of the Holocaust.

In an interview with the online magazine Tablet, Mishory discussed the complex emotions of filming there: "The history of Mărculeşti and the Holocaust pose impossible intellectual and theological questions. All I can say is that my feelings about what happened in Mărculeşti are complicated. I remain a practicing Jew. And I also have serious doubts about human nature. I’m angry that people who live overlooking a killing field lie about their history. But I also have a lot of empathy for the current residents of the village and their difficult circumstances.”

Mishory's third feature, Artur Schnabel: No Place of Exile, was made for the German-French television network Arte. The film was shot in Switzerland, Italy, Vienna, and Berlin, utilizing unexpected textures (such as Super 8, drone footage, and back-projection) and the German actor Udo Samel to chart pianist/composer Artur Schnabel's course through the emotional and physical landscapes of the European 20th century. In November 2018, the film was screened at The Library of Congress in Washington D.C. In 2019 it was released on the classical music channel medici.tv.

In March 2018, Mishory began filming Mosolov's Suitcase, the story of the Soviet avant-garde composer Alexander Mosolov, sent to the gulag by Joseph Stalin, with César Award-nominated actor Kirill Emelyanov in the title role. Over five years, production was delayed numerous times due to a global pandemic and the outbreak of war. In December 2023, Deadline Hollywood announced the casting of Lior Ashkenazi and the resumption of production on the film. In the first of three intersecting plotlines, Ashkenazi plays a celebrated film director who "recounts his unconventional efforts to complete a film abandoned in the wake of the Russian invasion of Ukraine". Deadline further reported the completion of principal photography and the release of a teaser trailer in February 2024.

In 2021, it was announced in Variety Magazine that Mishory would be directing the documentary Who Are the Marcuses? for Stone Canyon Entertainment and Rhino Films. The film premiered at the 2022 Newport Beach Film Festival and 2023 Santa Barbara International Film Festival. Film Threat reported that the film "offers a perspective on how philanthropy can make a change for the better, save a planet in crisis, and maybe even bring about lasting peace in the Middle East". Guitarist David Broza composed and performed the film's score. Mishory directed the 2023 documentary film Fioretta (film), that follows E. Randol Schoenberg and his son Joey in reclaiming 500 years of their family story.

Mishory also directs commercials. In 2018, he directed the "Powerful Performance” campaign for the brand TCL, starring NBA All-Star Giannis Antetokounmpo. In 2020, he again directed Antetokounmpo, along with his brother, Thanasis, in the "Enjoy More" campaign. He also directed a surf campaign with pro surfer Tia Blanco, filmed in Los Cabos, Mexico.

== Filmography ==
- Delphinium: A Childhood Portrait of Derek Jarman (2009)
- Joshua Tree, 1951: A Portrait of James Dean (2012)
- Absent (2015)
- Artur Schnabel: No Place of Exile (2018)
- Who Are the Marcuses? (2022)
- Fioretta (2023)
- Mosolov's Suitcase (2025)
