= Felix Khuner =

Austrian violinist (1906–1991)

- Born: 1906; Vienna, Austria
- Died: June 10, 1991 (aged 84–85) San Francisco, United States
- Genre: Classical
- Occupation: Violinist
- Years active: 1920s–1990s

Felix Khuner (1906 – June 10, 1991) was the second violinist of the Kolisch Quartet. He joined the quartet, then the Wien Quartet, in 1926 when the quartet needed a new second violinist. Khuner was reluctant, but when he visited Rudolf Kolisch, he was in conversation with Arnold Schoenberg. "Does the quartet rehearse with Schoenberg?" Khuner asked. When Kolisch answered yes, Khuner agreed to join the quartet. He was also once said to have echoed Kolisch's remarks about Stravinsky's compositions as "music about music". One of the notable places he performed with the Kolisch Quartet was Stephen Foster Memorial Hall in Pittsburgh, Pennsylvania.

He fled Vienna, Austria in 1938 and settled in Northern California where he joined the San Francisco Symphony Orchestra, where he would stay for 41 years. Upon the quartet's visit to Berkeley, California in the mid-1930s, Khuner chose Berkeley as the ideal place to live. He liked the cool Mediterranean climate. He met his future wife, Gertrude, in New York, and they wed in California in 1942. In 1943, he jointly performed with pianist Carl Fuerstner for several performances, playing piano-violin sonatas from between the 18th century and 1942 including composers such as George Frederick Handel, Ludwig van Beethoven, Robert Schumann and Igor Stravinsky. In the 1940s, he also performed with other San Francisco Symphony Orchestra members as the East Bay String Quartet.

Months before he was too old for the draft, Khuner was drafted into the US Army. He served first as a musician, and was later sent to New Guinea. After leaving the Army, he continued playing in the first violin section of the San Francisco Symphony Orchestra, and in the San Francisco Opera and in the orchestra of the San Francisco Ballet. After he retired from the San Francisco Symphony, Khuner did one more stint, joining them for their 1972 tour of Russia. He retired from the San Francisco Opera, which did not have a mandatory retirement age, a few years later.

In the 1970s, Khuner was an instructor in the music department of the University of California, teaching chamber music. He was also concert master of the Monterey Symphony in the late 1960s and early 1970s until retiring from performing in 1983. Khuner always had private violin students, giving lessons in his home in the Berkeley hills. He also performed regularly with the San Francisco Chamber Orchestra conducted by Edgar Braun.

He gave his last violin lesson only a few days before he died of lung cancer in June, 1991. He was survived by his wife of 49 years, Gertrude Khuner, four children, and four grandchildren. The Khuner Young Artist Concerto Competition is named after him.
