= Delphinium: A Childhood Portrait of Derek Jarman =

2009 short documentary film

- Directed by: Matthew Mishory
- Written by: Matthew Mishory
- Produced by: Stephanie Frank; Edward Singletary, Jr. Joe Wihl; Lili Wilde; Matthew Mishory; Andreas Andrea
- Starring: Samuel Garfield; Jeremiah Dupre; Keith Collins; Edward Singletary, Jr. Dalilah Rain; Clint Catalyst
- Cinematography: Lili Wilde
- Edited by: Johannes Bock
- Music by: Arban Severin and Steven Severin
- Release date: 26 September 2009
- Running time: 12 minutes
- Countries: United States; United Kingdom
- Language: English

Delphinium: A Childhood Portrait of Derek Jarman is a 2009 short film based on the early years, work, and legacy of British artist and filmmaker Derek Jarman. The film was written and directed by Matthew Mishory and produced by Iconoclastic Features. It was executive produced by Andreas Andrea. Keith Collins, Jarman's surviving muse, participated in the making of the film. Jonathan Caouette served as a creative advisor. It is the first narrative work about the life of Derek Jarman.

== Soundtrack ==
The original score was composed by Arban Severin and Steven Severin, founding member of Siouxsie and the Banshees and The Glove. The first ever appearance by Siouxsie and the Banshees in a motion picture had been a brief scene in Jarman's Jubilee (1978 film).

== Cast ==
The ensemble cast includes Samuel Garfield as a teenage Derek Jarman, Australian actor Jeremiah Dupre as The Groundskeeper, Keith Collins as The Man in the Window, Edward Singletary Jr., as The Headmaster, Dalilah Rain as Betts Jarman, Kamran Ali as the young Derek, and Clint Catalyst as The Interviewee.

== Production history ==
From inception to delivery, the film took two years to complete, including fundraising efforts, principal photography, and post-production; large sections were shot on super 8 at Jarman's iconic Prospect Cottage in Dungeness, Kent, and other scenes were shot in SoHo and on the Hampstead Heath in London.

== Reception ==
The film has been described as a "stylized and lyrical coming-of-age portrait of legendary painter, filmmaker, and activist Derek Jarman's artistic, sexual, and political awakening in post-War England." It had its world premiere at the 2009 Reykjavik International Film Festival in Iceland, its UK premiere at the Raindance Film Festival in London, and its California premiere at the 2010 Frameline International Film Festival in San Francisco. It won the Eastman Kodak Grand Prize for Best Short Film at the 2010 United States Super 8 and DV Film Festival and in 2011 was permanently installed in the British Film Institute's National Film Archive in London in the special collection Beautiful Things, "a major collection of over 100 films and television programmes that chronicle and explore queer representation and identities over the last century." The film received two sold-out screenings at the BFI Southbank as part of the British Film Institute's 2011 London Lesbian and Gay Film Festival. The film was released theatrically in Berlin at the Kino Moviemento and on DVD and VOD in the UK, North America, Germany, and France. In 2014, the film was re-released by the BFI as part of the Jarman2014 celebration. The film was later released by the BFI on its streaming platform BFI Player.
