= Othmar Steinbauer =

Austrian composer and music theorist

- Born: 6 November 1895; Vienna, Austria
- Died: 5 September 1962 (aged 66); Altenburg (Wilhelmsburg), Sankt Pölten District, Lower Austria
- Occupations: composer music theorist instrumentalist (volin/viola)
- Spouse(s): 1. Viola Thern; 2. Emmi Ukena
- Children: Gudrun Lifka (1921–1995)

Othmar Steinbauer (6 November 1895 – 5 September 1962) was an Austrian composer and music theorist. He progressed developments in twelve-tone composition (Klangreihenmusik). His own teachers included Joseph Marx, Anton Webern, Arnold Schoenberg and Josef Matthias Hauer.

== Life ==
Othmar Steinbauer was born in Vienna. His father was a bank employee, originally from Styria. Steinbauer attended teacher training college on the northwest side of Vienna. On passing his exams here he volunteered for military service in 1915. By the time the war ended, in 1918, he had reached the rank of a junior reserve officer (Oberleutnant). He now studied the violin, with both Otakar Ševčík and Gottfried Feist as teachers. He also studied music theory with Joseph Marx and later, after 1919, with Arnold Schoenberg. In the Society for Private Musical Performances (Verein für musikalische Privataufführungen) he quickly built a reputation for his musical interpretation. During 1921/22 he was also playing the viola in the Kolisch Quartet.

In 1922 he moved north, to Berlin, where he worked as a theatre musician. Together with Josef Rufer (1893–1985) and Karl Wiener (1891–1942) and Schoenberg's pupil Max Deutsch (1892–1982), he was a founder of the Society for Contemporary Music Performances in Berlin (Gesellschaft für moderne Musikaufführungen in Berlin). In this connection he organised a large number of concert performances. However, the peaking of the German inflation crisis forced him to return to Vienna in 1923.

Between 1924 and 1928 he focused on giving music lessons, both for the violin and for music theory. He also studied intensively some issues in music theory. Around 1927 he produced a paper entitled "The Nature of Tonality" (Das Wesen der Tonalität), which was published in 1928 by C.H. Beck in Munich. In it he attempted to provide a philosophical underpinning for tonality based on the idealistic Philosophy of Totality propounded by Othmar Spann, of whose teachings Steinbauer was an enthusiastic adherent between 1925 and 1930.

In February 1928 Steinbauer set up a chamber orchestra, the "Wiener Kammer Konzert Vereinigung" which performed successfully under his direction for the next three years in Germany and Austria. The early focus was on the baroque and early classical repertoires, but Steinbauer soon found himself asked to include modern music in the orchestra's programmes. Steinbauer set about getting hold of published works, turning to the Vienna-based Universal Edition company which published music both for the "Schoenberg circle" and for Josef Matthias Hauer. However, the publishers recommended only the music by Schoenberg and his adherents, Steinbach increasingly turned to Hauer directly. A friendship developed between them which included exchanges of ideas in the field of music theory, and which led, on 7 March 1930, to the first performance of Hauer's Symphonic Pieces Op. 49 by Steinbauer. Hauer was able to instruct Steinbauer on the basis of his Divertimento for smnall orchestra Op.61 which he dedicated to him. Based on the insights provided by Hauer, Steinbauer went on to develop his own "twelve tone theory" which he first summarised in a (never finished) manuscript as a "doctrine of sound and melody" (Klang- und Meloslehre) in 1934. The years from 1930 to 1935 he devoted, primarily, to composition and other work around his new doctrine, most of which was developed during this period even though it was not till the end of the 1950s that it acquired the soubriquet Klangreihenlehre (commonly translated as "twelve tone technique").

In 1935 Steinbauer again relocated to Berlin, where he took a small job as artistic research assistant (künstlerisch-wissenschaftlicher Hilfsarbeiter) in the National Institute for Music Research. He worked in the museum of old instruments which was part of the institute. And he composed. Early in 1938 Austria was merged into an enlarged Nazi German state and the regional Gauleiter (governor), Odilo Globocnik, gave orders for the establishment of a new music academy for Vienna, to be divided into two sections. One would focus on members of the Hitler Youth organisation and be headed up by Gottfried Preinfalk, and a second for German adult education under the auspices of the Nazi Strength Through Joy (Kraft durch Freude) leisure time and recreation operation. Steinbauer, who now moved back to Vienna, was given the headship of the overall organisation. The academy was quickly built and reportedly functioned to a high standard. In 1939 he also set up the Working Association for Old Music (Arbeitsgemeinschaft für alte Musik). In 1945 war ended and the Nazis fell from power. Steinbauer was dismissed and devoted himself primarily to composition and teaching. He also found time to invent a new type of violin based instrument, the so-called "Viellen", patented in 1951 and said to be particularly suitable for making music in the home.

From 1952 Steinbauer taught the violin at the Vienna Music Academy (today the University for the Music and Presentational Arts). Between 1959 and his retirement in 1961 he also provided special courses on twelve-tone composition. Composers who received certificates after completing one of these course included Erich Eder de Lastra, Kim Dal-Sung, Heinz Kratochwil, Hans Herbert Müller, Norbert Nowotny, Johann Sengstschmid, Otto Sulzer und Günther Theil. In 1961, after his retirement, he founded the Institute for Twelve-tone Composition in Vienna" (Seminar für Klangreihenkomposition in Wien) which he headed till his death the next year. Others involved with the institute included Helmut Neumann who still teaches and composes, according to Steinbauer's precepts. During the final year of his life Steinbauer also gave violin lessons to members of the Vienna Boys' Choir.

Steinbauer died on 5 September 1962 while taking a summer break at Altenburg (Wilhelmsburg) in the Lower Austrian countryside to the west of Vienna. The teaching book he had been writing on twelve-tone composition was unfinished at the time of his death. Later it was completed by former student Helmut Neumann, and published in 2001.
