= Kolisch Quartet =

The Kolisch Quartet was a string quartet musical ensemble founded in Vienna, originally (early 1920s) as the New Vienna String Quartet for the performance of Schoenberg's works, and (by 1927) settling to the form in which it was later known. It had a worldwide reputation and made several recordings. The quartet disbanded in the United States during the early 1940s.

== Personnel ==
violin 1:

- Rudolf Kolisch

violin 2:

- Jaromir Czerny (1921−1922)
- Gustav Kinzel (1922)
- Oskar Fitz (1922−1923)
- Fritz Rothschild (1924−1927)
- Felix Khuner (1927−1941)
- Daniel Guilevitch (1941−1943)
- Lorna Freedman (1943−1944)

viola:

- Othmar Steinbauer (1921−1922)
- Herbert Duesberg (1922−1923)
- Marcel Dick (1924−1927)
- Eugene Lehner (1927−1939)
- Jascha Veissi (1939−1941)
- Kurt Frederick (1941−1942)
- Ralph Hersh (1942−1943)
- Bernhard Milofsky (1943−1944)

violoncello:

- Erik Skeel-Görling (1921−1922)
- Wilhelm Winkler (1922−1923)
- Joachim Stutschewsky (1924−1927)
- Benar Heifetz (1927−1939)
- Stefan Auber (1939−1941)
- Fritz Magg (1942−1943)
- János Scholz (1943−1944)
- Stefan Auber (1944)

== Origins ==
In the early 1920s, the Viennese violinist Rudolf Kolisch began to study composition with Arnold Schoenberg, who also put Kolisch to work in the composer's "Society for Private Musical Performances" (Verein fuer musikalische Privatauffuehrungen). This led to the creation of a string quartet ("Neue Wiener Streichquartett") dedicated to performing Schoenberg's music, but also to performing the classical string quartet repertoire in a manner which would take into account the principles of Schoenberg's teaching. The quartet consisted initially of Kolisch and Fritz Rothschild (alternating first and second violins), Marcel Dick (viola) and Joachim Stutschewsky (cello). This ensemble began to concertize and tour in central Europe.

By 1927, the membership of the ensemble had settled: Kolisch played first violin, Felix Khuner played second violin, Eugene Lehner played viola and Benar Heifetz played cello; this group became known as the Kolisch Quartet. Numerous works were written for them by composers including Alban Berg, Anton Webern, Arnold Schoenberg, and Béla Bartók. The Quartet's tours extended eventually to include all European countries including Scandinavia, and also (by the mid-1930s) North and South America.

One notable aspect of the Quartet was that they generally performed from memory, including difficult modern works such as the Lyric Suite of Berg. This was not intended as a demonstration of any special powers of memorization, but rather of an approach which involved such careful rehearsal that by the time a piece was ready for performance, the musicians no longer required the score. The quartet used eye contact and were more able to respond musically to one another without music stands interfering.

The Quartet was on tour in Paris in 1938 when Nazi Germany annexed Austria. Because of their association with Schoenberg (whose music had been banned by the Nazis) and because most of the members of the Quartet were considered Jewish according to the Nazi legal definition, they did not return to Vienna. They set up their headquarters in Paris and toured from there.

Béla Bartók's String Quartet No. 6 is dedicated to the Kolisch Quartet, and it was they who gave its premiere at The Town Hall in New York City on 20 January 1941.

They were on tour in the United States when that country entered the war and civilian transport across the ocean suddenly became unavailable. Rather than continue with the Quartet in the face of great uncertainty about the future, the cellist and violist soon took jobs with major U.S. orchestras (Philadelphia and Boston, respectively). The Quartet continued to play concerts with replacement players for some time, but when the second violinist left to join an orchestra in San Francisco, the Quartet finally disbanded.

== Recordings ==
The Kolisch Quartet recorded several albums of string quartets of Franz Schubert and Wolfgang Amadeus Mozart on 78s for the Columbia Records and RCA record labels. In 1937 they recorded the four string quartets of Arnold Schoenberg privately under the composer's supervision; these were re-issued several years later as LP recordings on the "Alco" label. All the commercial recordings of the Kolisch Quartet are currently available on compact discs.

- Bartók: Quartet No. 5
- Mozart: Quartet in C major, K 465; Jascha Veissi, viola; Stefan Auber, cello (Columbia M439)
- Mozart: Quartet in D major, K 575 'Cello' or 'Solo' (Columbia LX 337-8).
- Schoenberg: Quartets 1-4
- Schubert: Quartet in A minor, Op. 29 (Columbia LX 286-9).
- Schubert: Quartettsatz in C minor (Columbia LX 289).
- Schubert: Quartet in G major, Op. 161 (Columbia LX 357-60).

== Sources ==
- R.D. Darrell, The Gramophone Shop Encyclopedia of Recorded Music (New York 1936).
