= E. Randol Schoenberg =

American lawyer

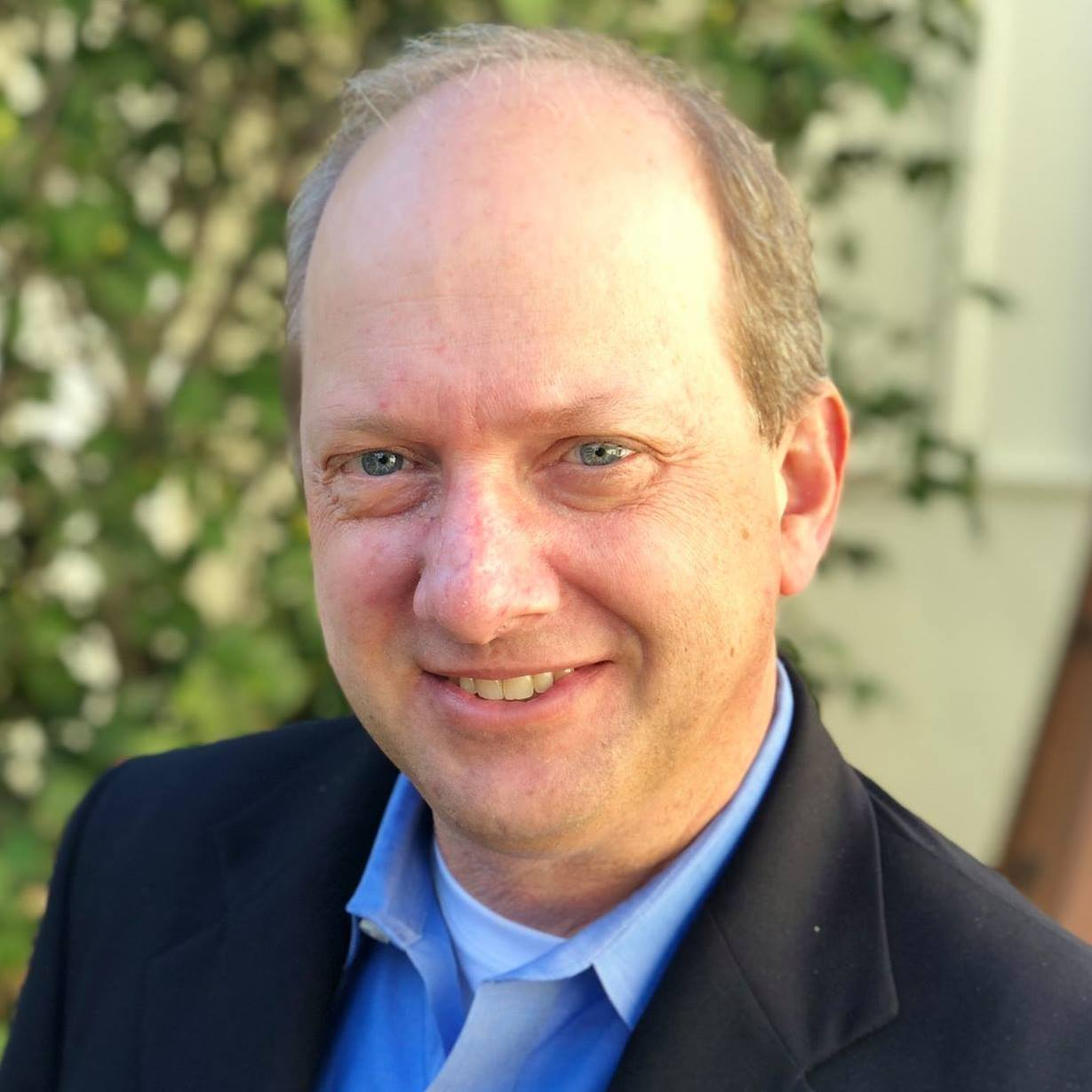
- Born: September 12, 1966 (age 60); Los Angeles County, California, U.S.
- Education: Princeton University (BA); University of Southern California (JD)
- Occupation: Lawyer
- Spouse: Pamela Mayers-Schoenberg
- Children: 2 sons, 1 daughter
- Parent(s): Ronald R. Schoenberg; Barbara Zeisl Schoenberg
- Relatives: Arnold Schoenberg (paternal grandfather); Eric Zeisl (maternal grandfather); Gertrud Schoenberg (paternal grandmother); Luigi Nono (uncle); Marlena Fejzo (sister); Rudolf Kolisch (paternal granduncle)

Eric Randol Schoenberg (born September 12, 1966) is a US attorney and genealogist, based in Los Angeles, California, specializing in legal cases related to the recovery of looted or stolen artworks, particularly those by the Nazi regime during the Holocaust.

Schoenberg is widely known as one of the central figures of the 2015 film Woman in Gold, which depicted the case of Maria Altmann against the government of Austria. Schoenberg is portrayed by Ryan Reynolds. He is also the subject of the 2023 genealogical documentary Fioretta.

== Early life and education ==
E. Randol Schoenberg was born to a Jewish American family of Austrian Jewish descent in 1966. He is the grandson of two Austrian-Jewish composers: Arnold Schoenberg and Eric Zeisl. His parents are Ronald R. Schoenberg and Barbara Zeisl Schoenberg. His grandmother Gertrud Schoenberg was the sister of Jewish violinist Rudolf Kolisch. His aunt Nuria is the widow of the Italian composer Luigi Nono. His younger sister Marlena Fejzo is a medical scientist. Both "Randol" and "Ronald" (father of E. Randol) are anagrams of "Arnold" (grandfather of E. Randol).

Schoenberg graduated from Princeton University in 1988 and graduated with a J.D. degree from the University of Southern California.

== Legal career ==
Schoenberg represented Maria Altmann in her suit to obtain five Gustav Klimt paintings from the estate of Ferdinand and Adele Bloch-Bauer as well as the "Palais", the Viennese house in which the paintings had been housed. Altmann won her case before the Supreme Court of the United States against the government of Austria in Republic of Austria v. Altmann in 2004. Schoenberg operated on a contingent fee basis and reportedly received 40% of the proceeds from the Klimt paintings, amounting to a legal fee of over $120 million. He used a portion of his fee to fund a new building and expansion of the Los Angeles Museum of the Holocaust. Schoenberg is featured in the documentary films Stealing Klimt and Adele's Wish, which deal with the events surrounding Altmann's case against the government of Austria. He is depicted by Ryan Reynolds in Woman in Gold, a 2015 feature film dramatizing the case.

Schoenberg acted for the defendants-appellants in the case of Yahoo! Inc. v. La Ligue Contre Le Racisme et l'Antisemitisme (LICRA) 433 F.3d 1199 (9th Ci. 2006), in the United States Court of Appeals for the Ninth Circuit.

In 2016, Schoenberg filed suit to obtain the release of the October 2016 search warrant obtained by the FBI against Hillary Clinton. In 2020, the 9th Circuit Court of Appeals affirmed the U.S. District Court's summary judgment ruling for the FBI.

As of April 2015, Schoenberg was counsel at the small law firm of Burris, Schoenberg & Walden, LLP, and a lecturer at the University of Southern California. He previously was an associate of the law firms Fried Frank and Katten Muchin. He was awarded the California Lawyer "Attorney of the Year" award in 2007.

== Philanthropy and genealogy ==
Schoenberg served as president of the Los Angeles Museum of the Holocaust from 2005 to 2015. He is an avid genealogist and serves as a volunteer curator for Geni.com, one of its most active users, managing over 150,000 profiles. He is a board member of JewishGen and the Co-Founder of its Austria-Czech Special Interest Group. He is the author of the Beginner's Guide to Austrian-Jewish Genealogy and the co-author of Getting Started with Czech-Jewish Genealogy.

== Personal life ==
Schoenberg resides in Brentwood, Los Angeles, California, with his wife, Pamela Mayers Schoenberg. They have two sons and a daughter.
