= Heinz Kratochwil =

Heinz Kratochwil (23 February 1933 – 2 April 1995) was an Austrian composer and music teacher.

== Life ==
Heinz Kratochwil was asked in 1992 why he was not better known.

"I do not belong to any clique and am probably too progressive for the conservatives and too conservative for the progressives, because my objective is a synthesis precisely between the two."
"Ich gehöre zu keiner Clique und bin wahrscheinlich den Konservativen zu progressiv, und den Progressiven zu konservativ, weil ich gerade in meinem Sythesebestreben dazwischen liege."

Heinz Kratochwil was born in Mödling a short distance to the south of Vienna. He graduated with a teaching qualification in 1955 from the Faculty of German Studies at the University of Vienna and was then, till 1961, a student of composition at the city's University of Music and Performing Arts ("Universität für Musik und darstellende Kunst Wien") where his teachers included Alfred Uhl and Othmar Steinbauer.

He started teaching at the University of Music and Performing Arts in 1962, teaching harmony and, from 1969, composition. He was appointed Professor of Composition ("Professor für Tonsatz") in 1980.

Most of his published compositions date from the final two decades of his life. His compositions blended elements of late romantic, impressionist, twelve-tone and jazz styles.

A highlight, published in 1987, was his first "opera" (described as a "church opera" / "Kirchenoper"), "Franziskus" (op. 161), a setting lasting approximately 75 minutes, using a libretto by Herbert Vogg, and concerned with the life of St. Francis. The first performance took place at the appropriately futuristic Wotruba Church on the western fringe of Vienna only in 1999, however, several years after the composer's death.

== Awards and prizes ==
- 1969 First Prize in "The New Song!" ("Das neue Lied!") competition from Austrian Radio
- 1978 First Prize for Composition from the Austrian Choral Association ("Chorverband Österreich")
- 1980 First Prize for Composition from the Carinthia Choral Association ("Kärntner Sängerbund")
- 1987 City of Vienna Music Prize
