= Fioretta =

2023 American documentary film

- Directed by: Matthew Mishory
- Written by: Matthew Mishory; Rob Levine
- Produced by: Álvaro Fernández; Bradford L. Schlei; Anneta Furdecká
- Cinematography: Maciej Twardowski
- Music by: Ohad Stemati
- Release date: September 30, 2023 (Woodstock)
- Countries: United States; Czech Republic; Austria; Italy
- Language: English

Fioretta is a 2023 documentary film directed by Matthew Mishory. It tells the story of American lawyer and genealogist E. Randol Schoenberg, who brings his reluctant teenage son Joey along for the journey of a lifetime to reclaim 500 years of their family story.

== Story ==
The film begins in Malibu, California, where Schoenberg and his son live, and navigates through Austria, Italy and the Czech Republic to track down their ancestors. Along the way they meet a motley cast of characters who guide them towards their ultimate goal of finding Fioretta, the family’s matriarch, buried five centuries ago in a Venice Jewish cemetery.

== Reception ==
Shula Kopf of The Jerusalem Post called Fioretta a "beautifully crafted, visually elegant documentary through five centuries of Jewish history".

Robert Abele of the Los Angeles Times said "A well-meaning but slapdash travelogue, Fioretta does find gratifying closure in the company that the Schoenbergs find: curators of a collective memory that won’t fade on their watch."

Samantha Bergeson of IndieWire said "Genealogist Randy Schoenberg, the grandson of composer Jewish-Austrian Arnold Schoenberg, sets out to reclaim his Viennese family legacy, but gets bogged down by intricate details."
