= Eugene Lehner =

Hungarian musician

Eugene Lehner (1906 – 13 September 1997) was a violist and music educator.

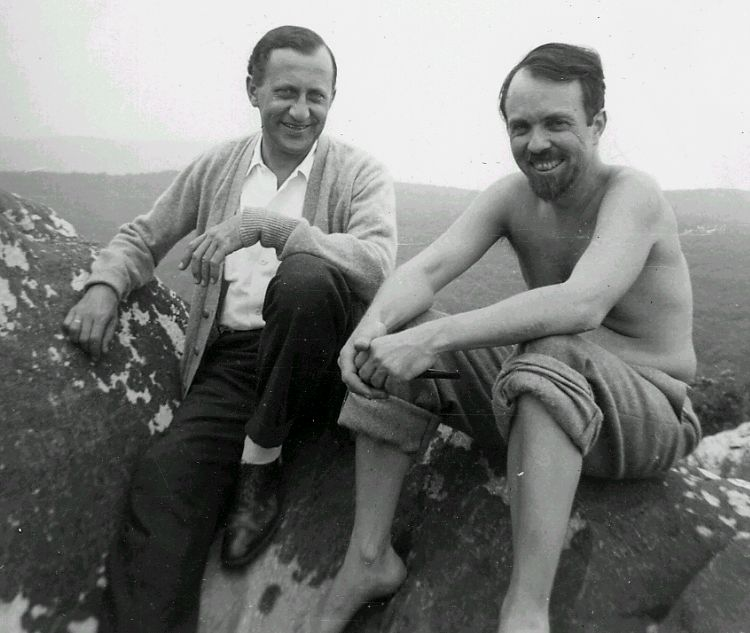
New England Conservatory of Music colleagues, Eugene (Jeno) Lehner and Francis Judd Cooke

Lehner, as he preferred to be addressed, was born in the Austro-Hungarian Empire in 1906. Originally named Jenö Léner, he performed as a self-taught violinist from the time he was 7. When he was 13, the composer Béla Bartók heard him play, and arranged for him to pursue his studies formally. At the Royal Conservatory of Music in Budapest, he studied the violin with Jeno Hubay and composition with Zoltán Kodály. In 1925, soon after his graduation from the conservatory at 19, he joined the Kolisch Quartet.

Lehner was a violist with the Kolisch Quartet from 1926 until 1939, performed with the Boston Symphony Orchestra for 39 years (the only player to be invited to join without an audition by Serge Koussevitzky), and continued teaching chamber music at the New England Conservatory of Music and Boston University well into his retirement. Late in his life most coachings were given at his home in Newton. The modest upstairs room he coached in contained photographs covering every wall from all the quartets that he mentored – a real "wall of fame". Lehner was widely regarded as one of the greatest living experts of the interpretation of chamber works by Alban Berg, Anton Webern, Arnold Schoenberg, and Béla Bartók, having been involved in the premieres of several of such works during his time with the Kolisch Quartet. As a member of the quartet, Lehner gave the premieres of Berg's Lyric Suite, Schoenberg's Third and Fourth String Quartets, Bartók's Fifth Quartet and Webern's Second Quartet.

When the Juilliard Quartet was formed, they spent a summer in intensive coachings with Lehner. He advocated playing string instruments with tempered intonation, in the spirit of Bach.
