= Holocaust Museum LA =

Museum in Los Angeles, California

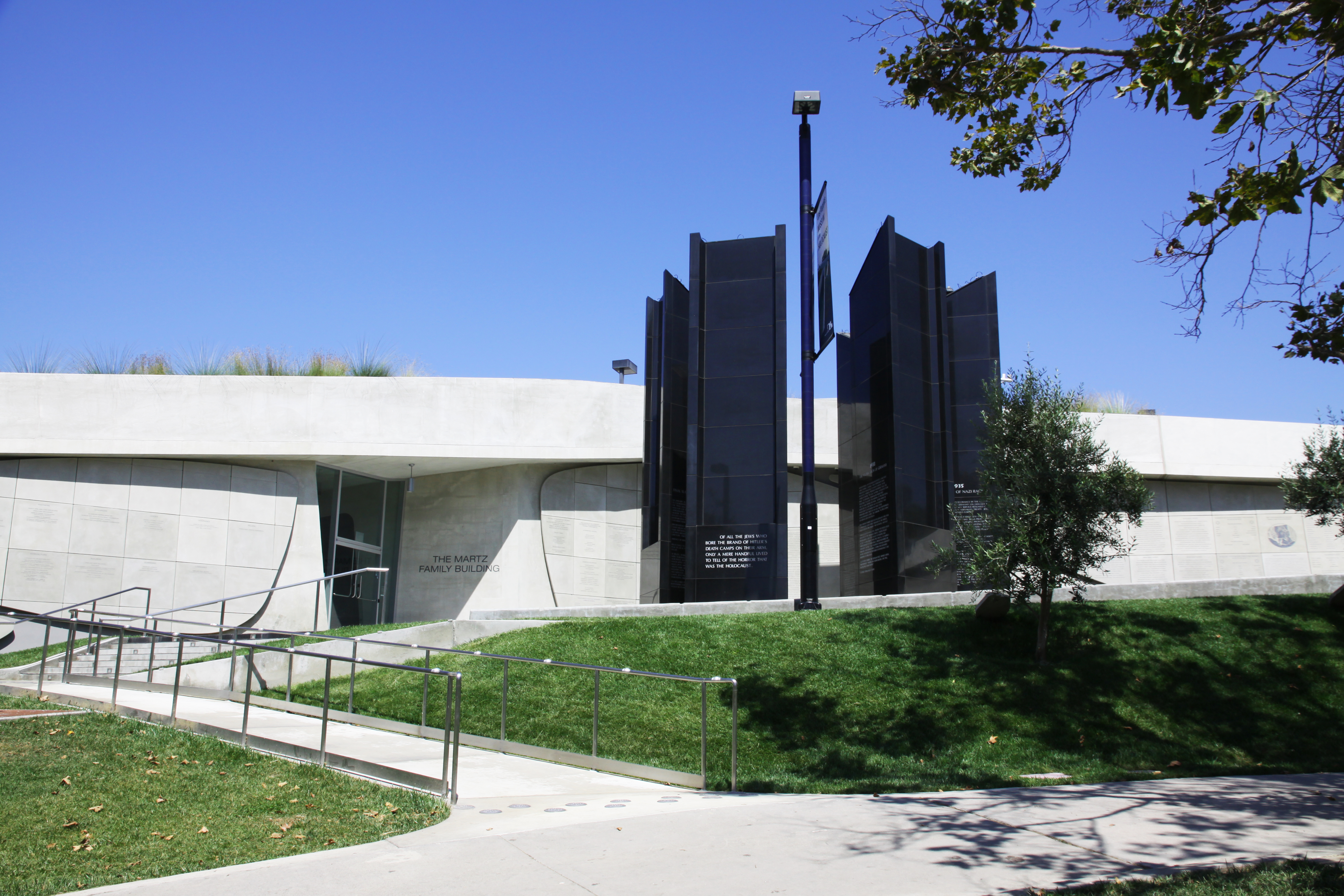

- Location of Holocaust Museum LA
- Former name: Los Angeles Museum of the Holocaust
- Established: 1961; 65 years ago
- Location: Pan Pacific Park; 100 S The Grove Dr; Fairfax District, Los Angeles, CA 90036
- Coordinates: 34.074609°N 118.356230°W
- Type: Holocaust / history museum
- Visitors: 500,000
- Director: Beth Kean
- Website: www.holocaustmuseumla.org

Holocaust Museum LA, formerly known as Los Angeles Museum of the Holocaust, is a museum located in Pan Pacific Park within the Fairfax district of Los Angeles, California. Founded in 1961 by Holocaust survivors, Holocaust Museum LA is the oldest museum of its kind in the United States. Its stated purpose is to commemorate those murdered in the Holocaust and those who survived, educate about the history, culture, and politics that led up to and facilitated the Holocaust, and warn about the potential for future genocides.

== History ==
Holocaust Museum LA is the oldest museum founded by Holocaust survivors in the United States. In 1961, a group of Holocaust survivors in an English as a second language class at Hollywood High School met and realized their deep connection and drive to steward the past. They began meeting to discuss their personal experiences, and the importance of commemorating their lost relatives and friends and educating future generations. They all had primary sources, such as photographs, artifacts, documents, and memories, and they decided that these objects needed a permanent home – a sanctuary for documentation, commemoration, preservation, and education.

Holocaust Museum LA opened its permanent subterranean building in Pan Pacific Park in October, 2010. Since then, it has had over 500,000 visitors.

=== Instagram post controversy ===
In September 2025, Holocaust Museum LA posted on their Instagram account a post that says "'Never again' can’t only mean never again for Jews ... Jews were raised to say 'Never Again.' That means never again. For anyone. ... Jews must not let the trauma of our past silence our conscience. Standing with humanity does not betray our people. It honors them." While the post does not mention nor alludes to any specific wars or conflicts, many interpreted it as an indirect statement from the museum towards the humanitarian crisis in the Gaza Strip. Following criticism from pro-Israel users, the museum deleted the post and later posted an apology post that stated that the deleted post was part of a pre-planned social media campaign intended to "promote inclusivity and community" and wasn't their intent to make statements about "the ongoing situation in the Middle East". The move was criticized by social media users, with some accusing the museum of betraying the memory of the Holocaust, and one unnamed donor threatened to withdraw donations.

== Education ==
Public programs: Museum admission is free for all students and California residents. Visitors can explore the museum independently and take a self-guided tour using the museum's free audio guide. Staff and docents also offer guided tours throughout the week. The museum offers public events, in-person and online, including conversations with Holocaust survivors, lectures, film screenings and concerts. In 2020, the museum launched "Building Bridges," a cross-cultural discussion series that brings together leaders from diverse communities for conversations about working toward common social justice goals.

Student education: Museum tours are designed to conform to the California State's curriculum, legislation, and academic standards regarding Holocaust education. In cooperation with teachers, museum staff customize each tour to fit the age level, prior knowledge, background and interests of the students. The museum uses personal narratives, artifact-rich exhibits, and technology to provide access to this history. The “Art & Memory” creative educational programs annually connect survivors with teens, who learn about their own heritage, retell the survivors’ stories, and share their reflections through different art mediums such as film, theatre and photography.

== Architecture ==
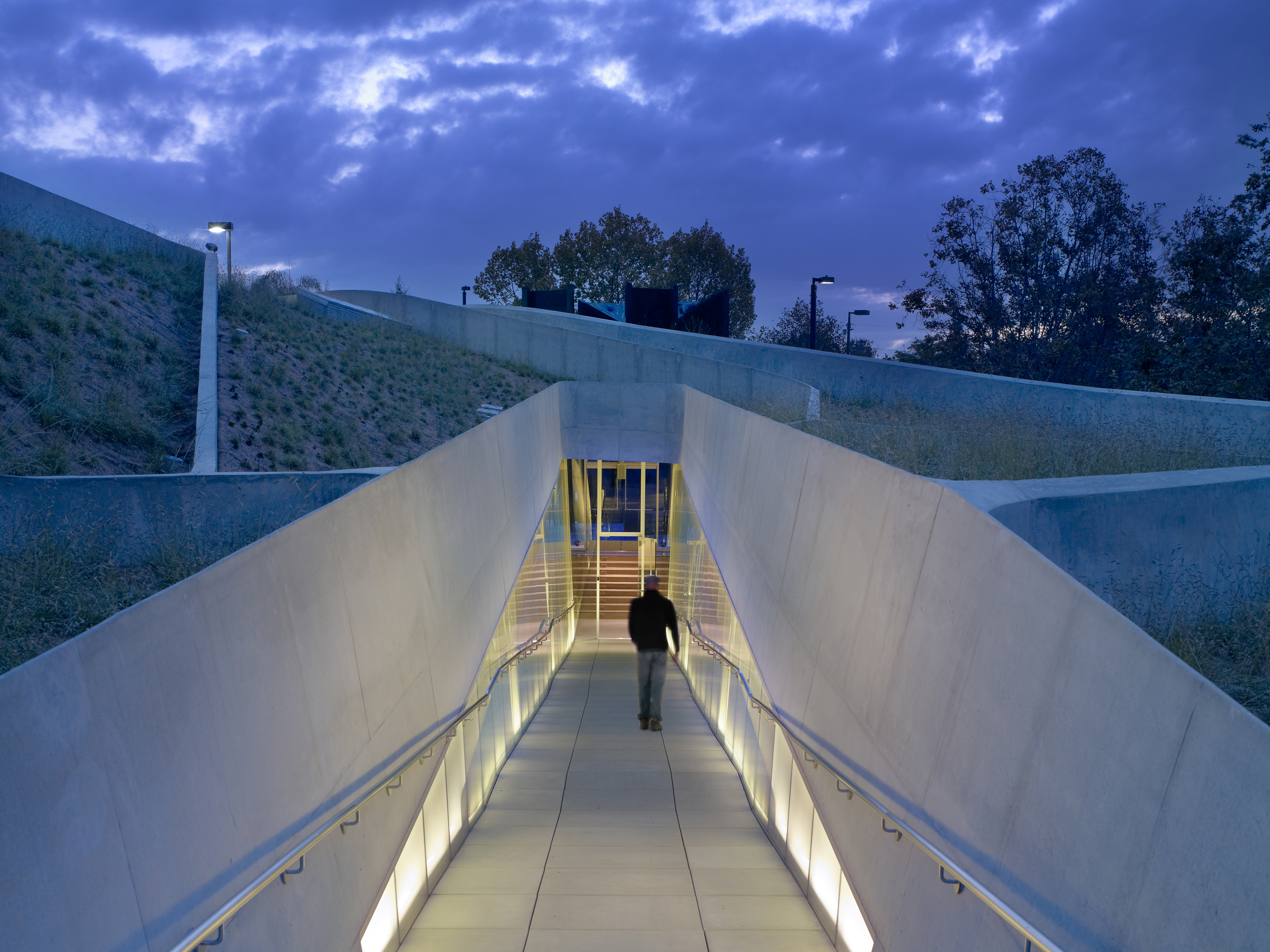
Holocaust Museum LA

In 2010, the President of the Museum Board, Randy Schoenberg, led the museum to move into its permanent home, designed by renowned architect Hagy Belzberg. Schoenberg's story of litigating the return of the Klimt painting, Adele Bloch-Bauer I, from Austria was featured in the film Woman in Gold.

The juxtaposition of the physical building and the surrounding park is a key component in the architectural design of the building. The museum is divided into three spaces: the internal museum space, the Goldrich Family Foundation Children's Memorial, and the outdoor Martyrs Memorial.

As visitors move through the internal museum the light and space change, mirroring the change of time through history. The galleries are organized chronologically and cover Jewish life before the Holocaust, as well as key historical events between 1933 and 1945. The museum features a collection of primary sources, and Holocaust Museum LA holds one of the largest collections in the United States of artifacts from the Holocaust period.

The Children's Memorial is an outdoor reflective space where the approximately 1.5 million children who were murdered in the Holocaust are remembered. There are 1.2 million holes of various sizes in the walls of the Children's Memorial, and visitors can write messages to the children. A small Garden of the Righteous pays homage to non-Jews who risked their lives to save others.

Finally, the Martyr's Memorial monument, which was built in the early 1990s, consists of six 18-foot-high (5.5 m) triangular, black granite pillars. Each one honors the 6 million Jews who were murdered in the Holocaust. These pillars are also meant to symbolize the crematoria smokestacks.

The building design received the Los Angeles Cultural Affairs Commission Design Honor Award, the Green Building Design Award, and a Gold LEED rating – the national standard of sustainable architecture. The award-winning interior and exterior architecture reflect the poignant history covered in the museum's galleries.

== Exhibitions ==
- Tour Holocaust Museum LA from Home!
- Dimensions in Testimony: Renee Firestone.
- Tree of Testimony: In collaboration with the USC Shoah Foundation, Holocaust Museum LA installed a 70-screen video sculpture that displays the 52,000 survivor testimonies from the USC Shoah database. Visitors can use their audio guides to listen to any of the 70 testimonies that are being highlighted. Since there are about 50,000 stories and only 70 screens, each Survivor is guaranteed to be shown at least once a year, ensuring that each visitor experiences a different testimony. At any given time, there are survivors speaking in up to 32 different languages.
- The Sobibor Model: Sobibor was one of the six main death camps established by the Nazis and was part of the Operation Reinhard plan to murder all the Jews of Poland. Survivor Thomas Blatt built a model of the Sobibor Extermination camp solely from memory, and it is permanently displayed at Holocaust Museum LA. There is also a video screen above the model where Blatt talks about his experience in the camp. Blatt was a part of the 250 prisoners who carefully planned and executed their escape from Sobibor. Blatt was one of only about 50 survivors.
- Symbols of Hate
- Childhood Left at the Station
- Children's Memorial

== Expansion ==
Because the number of visitors to the museum increased by 400% since 2011, an expansion was planned in 2021. The Jona Goldrich Campus will be designed by architect Hagy Belzberg, with new indoor and outdoor spaces that will double its footprint in Pan Pacific Park. The museum hopes to amplify its reach and impact and increase its visibility. In June 2022, Susan and Eric Smidt donated $5 million toward the development of the Jona Goldrich Campus.

A new Learning Center Pavilion along The Grove Drive, adjacent to the existing building, will include a dedicated theater for USC Shoah Foundation’s Dimensions in Testimony. This 200-seat theater will be used for film screenings, concerts, conferences and public programs. The Learning Center Pavilion will also have outdoor reflective spaces, two classrooms for large student groups and programs for younger audiences, and 2,500 sq. ft. of special exhibit space. In addition, a new Boxcar Pavilion built to house an authentic boxcar found outside of Majdanek death camp in Poland will be constructed on top of the existing building.

== See also ==
- History of the Jews in Los Angeles
- Jews and Judaism in Los Angeles topics
- Austrian Holocaust Memorial Service of Austrian Service Abroad — Holocaust Museum LA participates
- List of Holocaust memorials and museums in the United States
