= Gertrud Schoenberg =

Austrian opera librettist

Gertrud Bertha Schoenberg (née, Kolisch; pen name, Max Blonda; 11 July 1898 – 14 February 1967) was an Austrian opera librettist. She was the second wife of Austrian composer Arnold Schoenberg, whom she married in 1924, and the sister of his pupil, the violinist Rudolf Kolisch.

== Life and career ==
Schoenberg was born in Karlovy Vary, and raised in Vienna, the daughter of Henriette Anna Theresia (Hoffmann) and Rudolf Rafael Kolisch a physician and docent at the University of Vienna. Her father and maternal grandfather were Jewish, while her maternal grandmother was Catholic.

She wrote the libretto for Schoenberg's one-act opera Von heute auf morgen under the pseudonym Max Blonda. At her request Schoenberg's (ultimately unfinished) piece, Die Jakobsleiter was prepared for performance by Schoenberg's student Winfried Zillig. After her husband's death in 1951 she founded Belmont Music Publishers devoted to the publication of his works, and was also a key figure in bringing about the premiere of Schoenberg's opera Moses und Aron. Arnold used the notes G and E♭ (German: Es, i.e., "S") for "Gertrud Schoenberg", in the Suite, for septet, Op. 29 (1925).

She is not to be confused with either Gertrud Schönberg (1902–1947), who was Arnold Schoenberg's eldest child by his first wife Mathilde and who later married composer Felix Greissle, or with the soprano Gertrude Schoenberg (1914–1999) who had been a student of Schoenberg's and was the wife of composer Leon Kirchner.

From the marriage of Arnold Schoenberg and Gertrude Kolisch there were three children: Nuria Dorothea (born 1932), Ronald Rudolf (born 1937), and Lawrence Adam (born 1941). Their daughter Nuria married Italian composer Luigi Nono in 1955. One of Gertrud Schoenberg's grandsons is lawyer E. Randol Schoenberg.
