= Felix Greissle =

Austrian-American conductor (1894–1982)

- Born: November 15, 1894; Vienna, Austria
- Died: April 26, 1982 (aged 87) Manhasset, New York, U.S.
- Genre: Classical
- Occupations: Conductor; arranger; music editor; educator
- Instrument: Cello
- Years active: 1919–1982
- Formerly of: Society for Private Musical Performances; Vienna State Opera Cantata Society

Felix Greissle (November 15, 1894 – April 26, 1982) was an Austrian-born American conductor, arranger, music editor and educator. He was the son-in-law of composer Arnold Schoenberg with whom he had studied. He worked closely with Schoenberg as a rehearsal coach and conductor; leading the premiere performances of several of Schoenberg's works. He was also a conductor at the Vienna State Opera prior to fleeing Germany for the United States after the Anschluss in 1938. He became a naturalized American citizen and worked as a music editor and music educator in New York City and Philadelphia.

== Life and career ==
Felix Greissle was born in Vienna, Austria on November 15, 1894. He began his musical training as a cellist. He studied musicology at the University of Vienna where he was a pupil of Guido Adler.

In 1919 Greissle began private lessons with composer Arnold Schoenberg, and in 1921 Griessle married Gertrud Schoenberg (named for her mother Gertrud Schoenberg); the composer's eldest daughter. He was married to Gertrud until her death in 1947. Schoenberg employed Greissle as a rehearsal coach and conductor for his Society for Private Musical Performances. This led to Greissle conducting the premieres of several of Schoenberg's works; including the Schoenberg Wind Quintet (1924). Schoenberg's Drei Satiren (Op. 28) was composed for Greissle in 1925–1926. He also wrote new arrangements for several of Schoenberg's pieces; including one for Five Pieces for Orchestra.

From 1925 to 1937 Greissle was conductor of the Cantata Society of the Vienna State Opera. With the events surrounding the Anschluss in 1938, Greissle fled Germany for the United States. He settled in New York City where he married his second wife, Jacqueline S. Rafkind, in 1948. He became a naturalized American citizen that same year.

Greissle worked as a music editor for G. Schirmer from 1938 to 1946 and then Edward B. Marks from 1946 until his retirement. He concurrently taught music theory and conducting both privately and on the faculties of several institutions; including Columbia University, the Philadelphia Musical Academy (later renamed the University of the Arts), the 92nd Street Y, and The New School for Music. He wrote a manuscript about Schoenberg which he completed shortly before his death in Manhasset, New York on April 26, 1982, at the age of 87.
