= Arban Severin =

American composer

Arban Severin (née Ornelas) (born October 20, 1976) is an American composer and musician.

Born in Beaumont, Texas, USA, to two classical musicians; her mother is a violinist, her father, a trumpet player, jazz bassist and professor of music. She is named after the 19th century French cornet composer, Jean-Baptiste Arban who her father wrote his doctoral dissertation on. Arban is married to Steven Severin (former bassist/songwriter with Siouxsie and the Banshees and latterly film and theatre score composer) by whom she has had a son, Cage. (named after 20th-century American avant-garde composer, John Cage)

Her maternal grandmother, Violette Newton, was named Poet Laureate of Texas in 1973, and is the author of several books, mostly poetry.

She comes from a long line of musicians on her father's side. Her paternal grandfather, Antonio "Tony" Ornelas, was part of a group of jazz musicians who started the Corpus Christi Jazz Festival. His saxophone hangs in a museum in that city, Corpus Christi, Texas

She attended art schools in Texas and Seattle, studying painting, multi-media and design.

Although she comes from a family of musicians she never learned to play an instrument, instead focusing on the visual arts, specifically drawing and painting. It was not until she was 24, that she started up an electronic duo named Darling Hate with SoCal electronic musician Paul Palazuelos. They released a few songs as demos online, which caught the attention of Siouxsie and the Banshees bassist Steven Severin. Severin brought Arban over to London to record the demos in a "proper" studio, this is how they met and consequently fell in love and married.

Her father's family is originally from Mexico. Her mother's family immigrated to America from England, Scotland (by way of Northern Ireland), Germany and France.

Formerly the singer and a musician in the band Darling Hate, she is now credited as the co-producer (with her husband) of the soundtrack derived album "London Voodoo" (the original soundtrack to the British independent supernatural thriller) and joint composer, again with her husband, of Beauty and the Beast; a score originally created for performances by dancer/choreographer Shakti. Arban and Steven Severin's soundtrack for the film Nature Morte, was released on their Subconscious music label on 16 October 2006. Arban's first solo score is for the British independent sci-fi thriller Mindflesh, which is currently in post-production.

Previously an actress, notably with the independent US film company Troma, as Arban Ornelas, she has also portrayed the popular comic book character "Vampirella". She had a brief pin-up career before devoting herself fully to music and her family. She has been painted by famous pin up artist Olivia De Berardinis, as well as fantasy artists Luis Royo and Simon Bisley.

In late 2007, Arban hooked up with Demian Castellanos (the Orichalc Phase/the Oscillation) to form a new group called The Dream Machine.

== See also ==
- Troma
