= Rudolf Rafael Kolisch =

Austrian physician

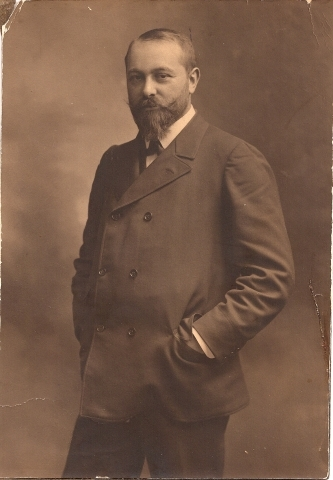
Rudolf Kolisch

Rudolf Rafael Kolisch (10 December 1867 – 7 April 1922) was an Austrian physician.

== Biography ==
Kolisch was born at Koryčany, Moravia on 10 December 1867, the son of postmaster Adolf Kolisch and Amalie Reif. He was the nephew of the author and journalist Sigmund Kolisch. He studied medicine at Vienna and Heidelberg (M.D. 1891). In 1895 he became privat-docent in medicine at the University of Vienna. Besides lecturing during the sessions of the university he practised medicine in Karlsbad during the summer months.

Kolisch was one of the first authors in Germany to support the view of French physiologist Claude Bernard that diabetes is caused by increased formation of sugar in the tissues. He was the principal champion of a vegetarian diet and a restriction of protein to treat diabetes. Kolisch's work had a strong influence on the development of diabetes therapy in the two decades prior to the first use of insulin in 1922, a time when the most important problem in diabetes therapy was balancing the ratio between protein and carbohydrates.

Kolisch was father of the violinist Rudolf Kolisch and Gertrud Schoenberg. He died on 7 April 1922 in Vienna.

== Publications ==
- Kolisch, Rudolf: Die Reiztheorie und die modernen Behandlungsmethoden des Diabetes. Vienna 1918.
- Kolisch, Rudolf: Über Wesen und Behandlung der uratischen Diathese. Stuttgart 1895.
- Kolisch, Rudolf: Lehrbuch der diätetischen Therapie chronischer Krankheiten für Ärzte und Studierende. I. Allgemeinder Theil. Bd. 1. Leipzig and Vienna 1899.
- Kolisch, Rudolf, Schumnn-Leclerq F.: Zur Frage der Kohlehydrattoleranz der Diabetiker. In: Wiener klinische Wochenschrift No. 48. 1903.
- Kolisch, Rudolf: Die diätetische Behandlung der Choleithiasis. In: Monatsschrift für die physikalisch-diätetischen Heilmethoden in ärztlicher Praxis. No. 2. 1909.
- Kolisch, Rudolf: Beiträge zur Diabetesdiät. In: Zentralblatt für die gesamte Therapie. No. 23. 1905.
- Kolisch, Rudolf: Experimenteller Beitrag zur Lehre von der alimentären Glykosurie. In: Centralblatt für klinische Medicin. No. 35. 1892.
- Kolisch, Rudolf: Grundzüge der diätetischen Behandlung des schweren Diabetes. In: Zeitschrift für physikalische und diätetische Therapie. No. 12. 1908-1909.
- Kolisch, Rudolf: Zur Theorie der Diabetesdiät. In: Wiener medicinische Wochenschrift. No. 20-22. 1902.
- Kolisch, Rudolf, von Stejskal, Karl: Ueber den Zuckergehalt des normalen und diabetischen Blutes. In: Wiener klinische Wochenschrift. No. 50. 1897.
- Kolisch, Rudolf: Die functionellen Beziehungen der Leber zur Pathologie des Stoffwechsels. In: Wiener medicinische Wochenschrift. No. 5–8. 1898.
- Kolisch, Rudolf, Pichler, Karl: Ein Fall von Morbus Addisonii mit Stoffwechseluntersuchung. In: Centralblatt für klinische Medizin. No. 12. 1893.
- Kolisch, Rudolf, Karl von Stejskal, Karl: Ueber die durch Blutzerfall bedingten Veränderungen des Harns. In: Zeitschrift für klinische Medizin. No. 27. 1895.
- Kolisch, Rudolf: Das Verhalten der Alloxurkörper im pathologischen Harn. In: Wiener klinische Wochenschrift No. 23–24. 1895.
