= Stealing Klimt =

2007 documentary film

Stealing Klimt is a 2007 documentary film about Maria Altmann's attempt to recover five Gustav Klimt paintings, stolen from her family by the Nazis in 1938, from Austria. The story covers the 2004-'06 legal case of the Republic of Austria v. Altmann, which resulted in the Österreichische Galerie Belvedere being forced to hand over the five paintings to Altmann. One was sold and donated to the Neue Galerie New York; the other four were sold to private collectors.

== Storyline ==
The paintings included Portrait of Adele Bloch-Bauer I, the portrait of Altmann's aunt, Adele Bloch-Bauer, which had been renamed the Woman in Gold. Stealing Klimt recounts Altmann's youth in early 20th century Vienna, her escape from the Nazis, and her struggle to recover the five paintings.

Altmann selected Randol Schoenberg, a US lawyer from California with an Austrian background, to represent her in her legal quest to recover the five Klimts. Altmann and Schoenberg were assisted by Hubertus Czernin, an Austrian journalist, who had previously investigated and revealed the World War II activities of Kurt Waldheim, former President of Austria and UN Secretary General.

Altmann's legal battle eventually ended up in the US Supreme Court where she had to face not only Austria but also the US State Department.

The US Supreme Court gave jurisdiction over Austria, and an Austrian arbitration panel then decided that the five paintings belonged to her.

The ruling in favour of Maria Altmann came as a great shock to the Austrian public and the government. The loss of the paintings was regarded in Austria as a loss of national treasure.

The five paintings

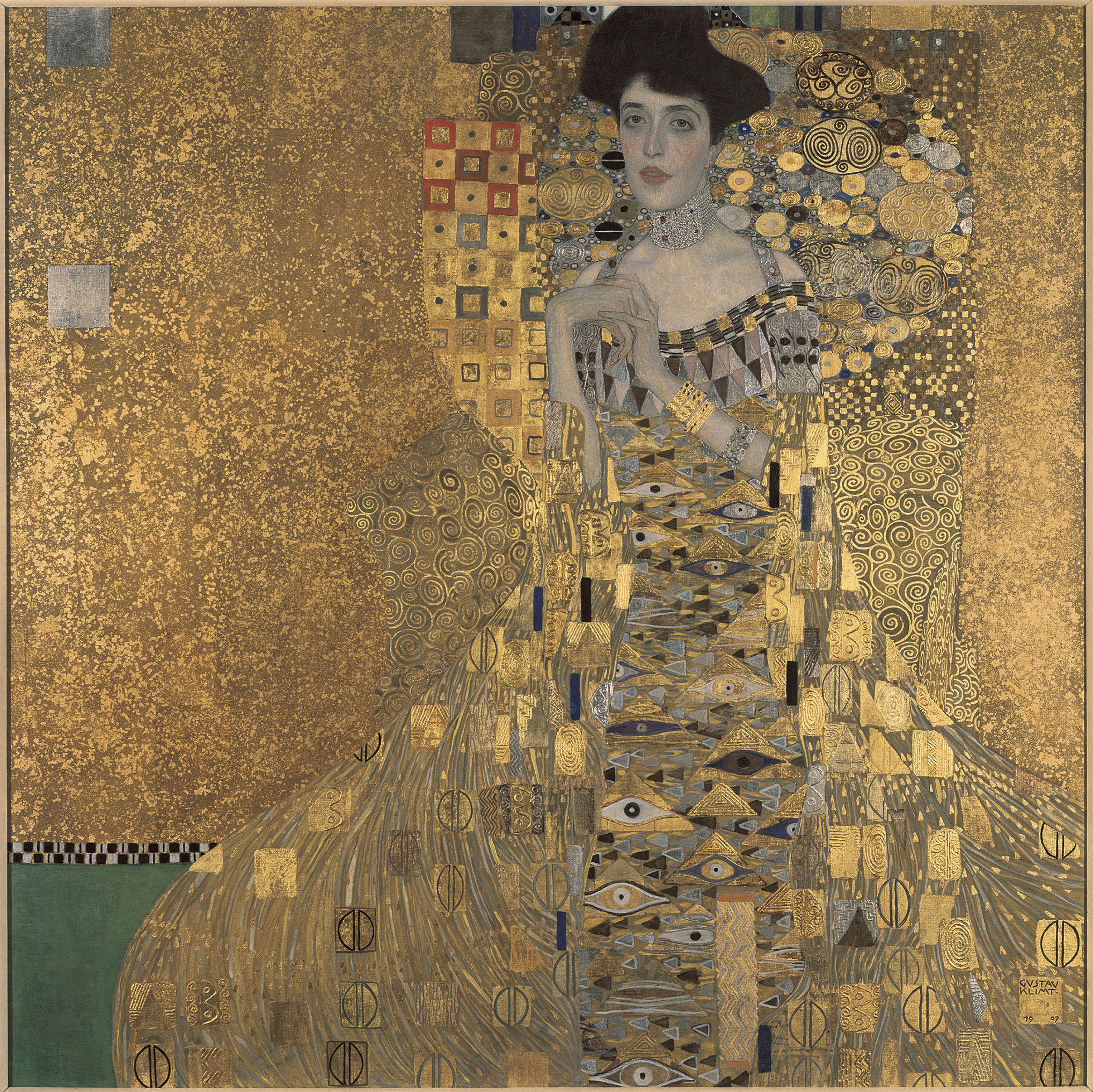
Portrait of Adele Bloch-Bauer, 1907

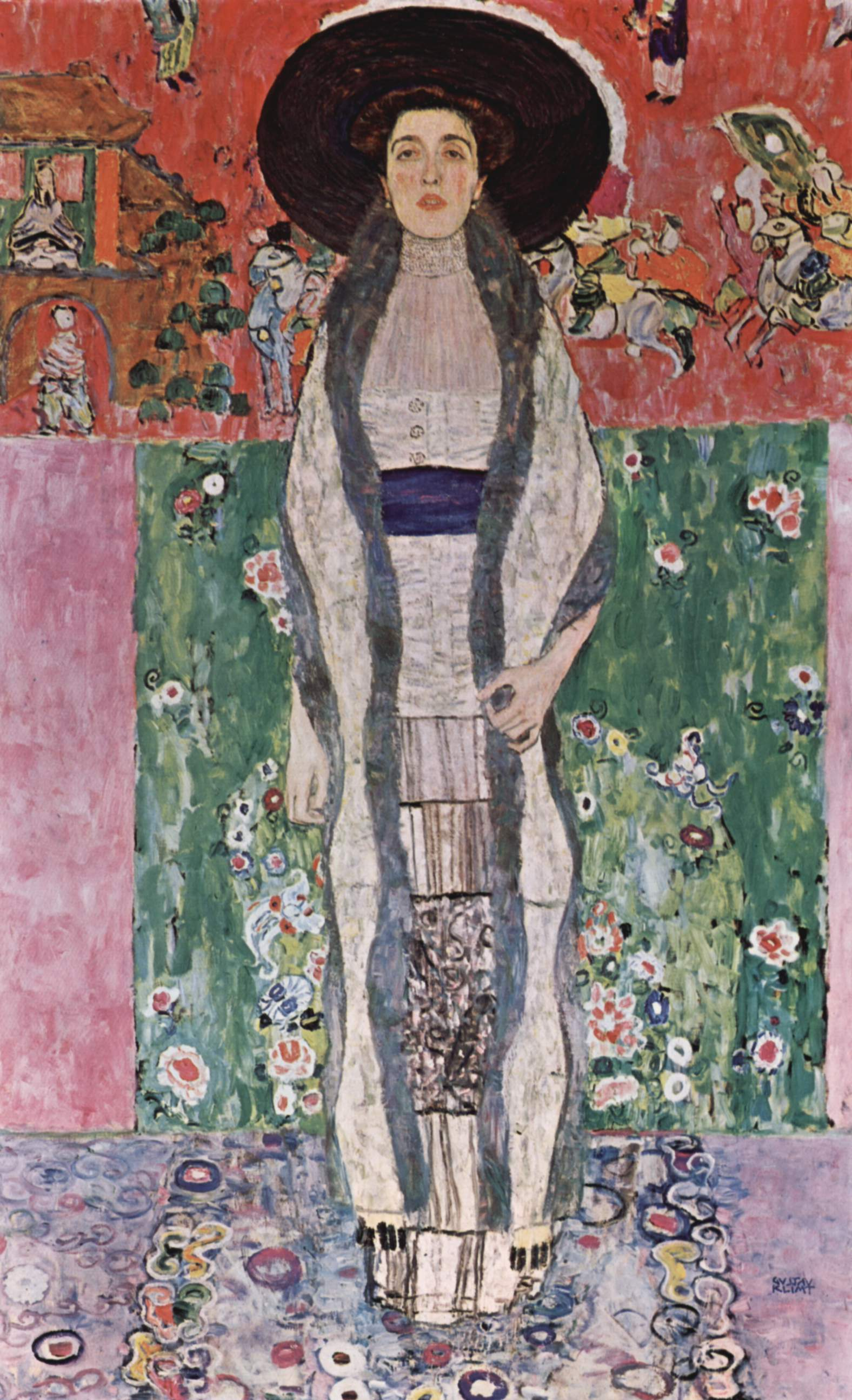
Adele Bloch-Bauer II, 1912

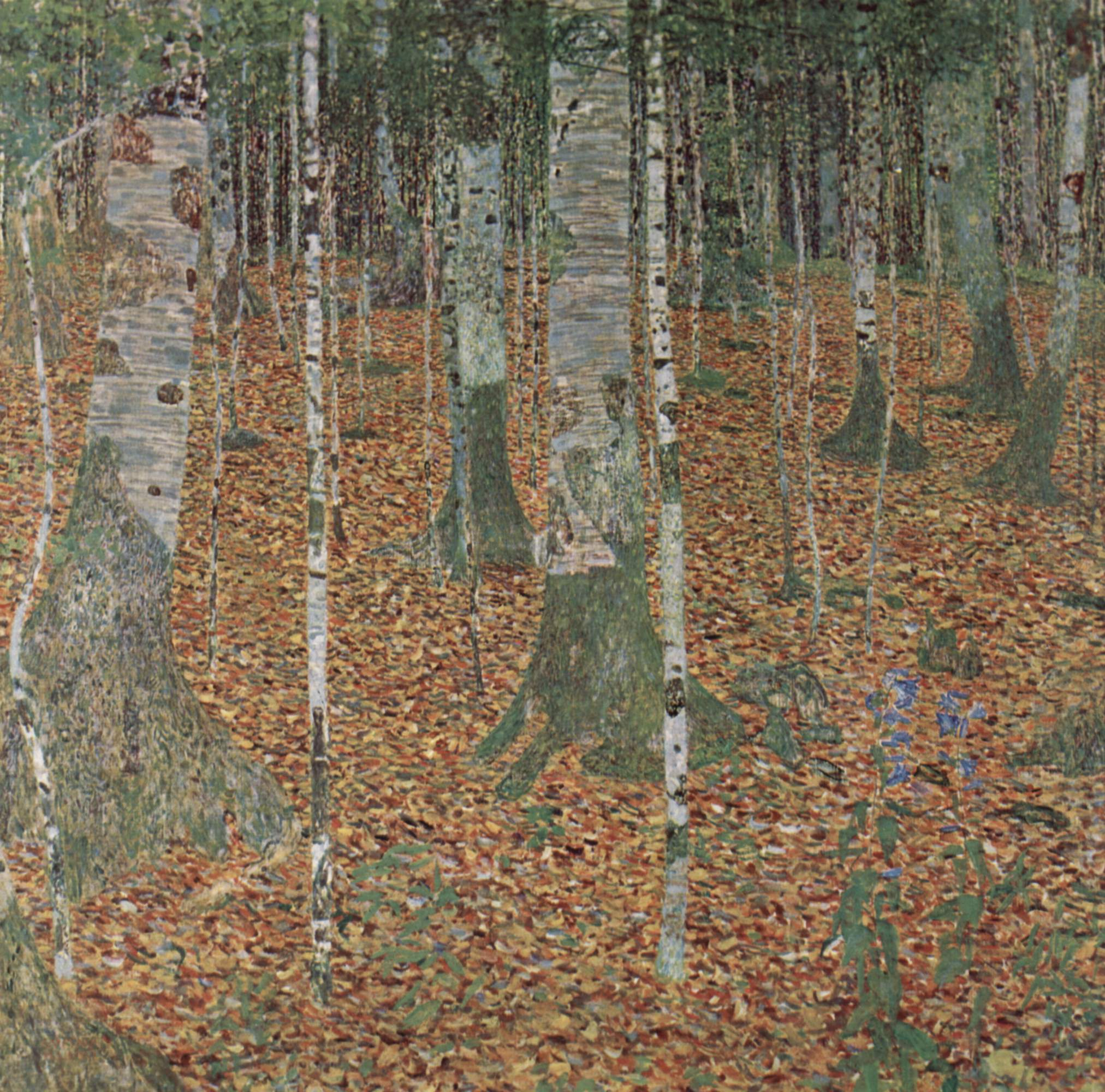
Buchenwald/Birkenwald, 1903

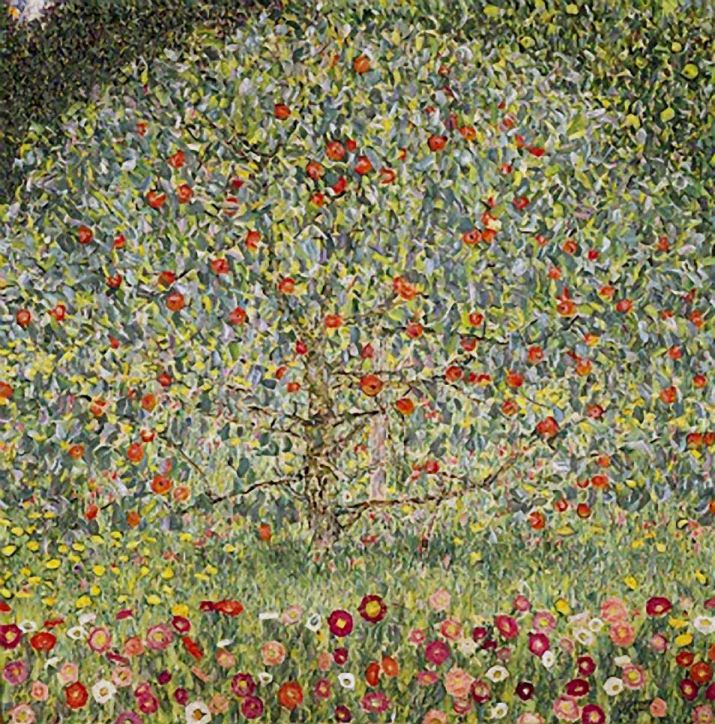
Apfelbaum I, 1912

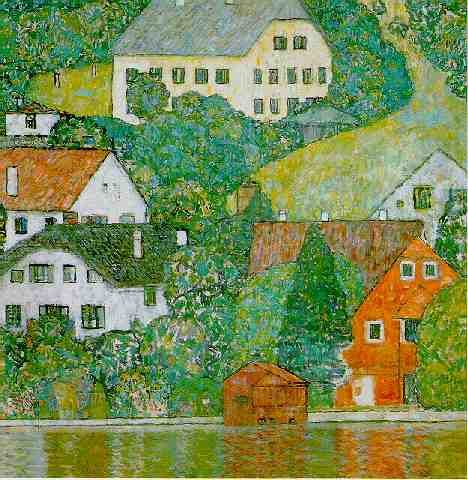
Häuser in Unterach am Attersee, 1916

Ronald Lauder paid US$135 million for the Woman in Gold to hang in his Neue Galerie in New York. The other four paintings were sold through Christie's to private buyers.

== Aftermath ==
Stealing Klimt formed the inspiration for the 2015 movie, Woman in Gold, and received a credit to that effect ("Inspired by the documentary, Stealing Klimt").
