= Wilhelmsburg, Austria =

Wilhelmsburg
- Municipality
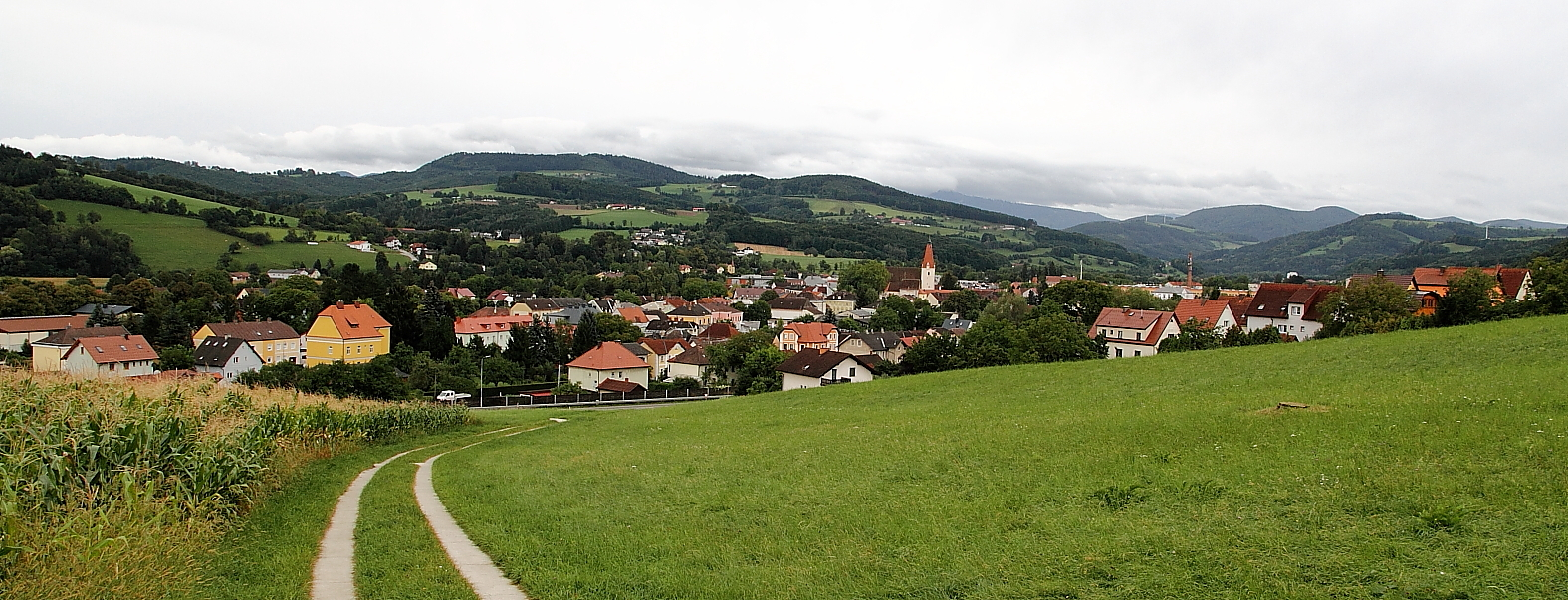
- View from north

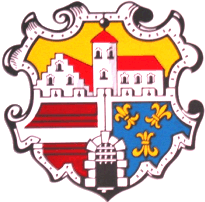
- Coat of arms

- Location within Austria
- Coordinates: 48°06′39″N 15°36′36″E
- Country: Austria
- State: Lower Austria
- District: Sankt Pölten-Land

Government
  - Mayor: Peter Reitzner (SPÖ)

Area
  - Total: 45.78 km^{2} (17.68 sq mi)
- Elevation: 321 m (1,053 ft)

Population (2018-01-01)
  - Total: 6,557
  - Density: 143.2/km^{2} (371.0/sq mi)
- Time zone: UTC+1 (CET)
  - Summer (DST): UTC+2 (CEST)
- Postal code: 3150
- Area code: 0 27 46
- Vehicle registration: PL
- Website: www.wilhelmsburg.gv.at

Wilhelmsburg is a municipality in the district of Sankt Pölten-Land District in the Austrian state of Lower Austria.

== Population ==
Historical population
Year	Pop.	±%
1869	3,291	—
1880	3,405	+3.5%
1890	4,141	+21.6%
1900	4,965	+19.9%
1910	6,419	+29.3%
1923	6,015	−6.3%
1934	5,499	−8.6%
1939	5,642	+2.6%
1951	5,724	+1.5%
1961	6,196	+8.2%
1971	6,408	+3.4%
1981	6,331	−1.2%
1991	6,572	+3.8%
2001	6,660	+1.3%
2011	6,534	−1.9%
