= Rudolf Kolisch =

Rudolf Kolisch (July 20, 1896 – August 1, 1978) was a Viennese violinist and leader of string quartets, including the Kolisch Quartet and the Pro Arte Quartet.

== Early life and education ==
Kolisch was born in Klamm, Schottwien, Lower Austria and raised in Vienna, the son of Henriette Anna Theresia (Hoffmann) and Dr. Rudolf Rafael Kolisch, a prominent physician and Dozent at the University. One of his two sisters was Gertrud Schoenberg, Arnold Schoenberg's second wife. His father and maternal grandfather were Jewish, while his maternal grandmother was Catholic. Due to a childhood injury to the middle finger of his left hand, Kolisch, who had already begun to play the violin, relearned the instrument with the functions of the hands reversed. Following service in World War I, Kolisch attended both the University and the Musikakademie, where he studied violin with Otakar Ševčík, composition with Franz Schreker and conducting with Franz Schalk, intending at first to make a career as a conductor.

== Career ==
In 1919, he began studying composition with Arnold Schoenberg, who became his brother-in-law in 1924. He put Kolisch to work in the "Society for Private Musical Performances in Vienna" (Verein für musikalische Privataufführungen in Wien). This led to the creation of a string quartet ("Wiener Streichquartett") to perform both Schoenberg's music and the classical string quartet repertoire in a manner that would take into account the principles of Schoenberg's teaching. Schoenberg directed many rehearsals of this quartet. By 1927, the ensemble had become known as the Kolisch Quartet and premiered contemporary works including those written for them by Alban Berg, Anton Webern, Schoenberg, and Béla Bartók.

Stranded in New York by the entrance of the United States into World War II, Kolisch at first tried to keep the Quartet together. When this failed, he took a position on the faculty of The New School, lecturing on "Musical Performance: The Realization of Musical Meaning". With Otto Klemperer, he co-founded a chamber orchestra at the school, with which he gave the first U.S. performances of Bartók's Music for Strings, Percussion and Celesta, Igor Stravinsky's l'Histoire du Soldat and Schoenberg's Chamber Symphony No. 1. During this time he prepared the ensemble and participated in the recording of Schoenberg's Pierrot lunaire, conducted by the composer. He researched and wrote an article, "Tempo and Character in Beethoven's Music" which was presented to the New York chapter of the American Musicological Society and later published in two installments in the magazine Musical Quarterly.

In 1944, Kolisch was invited to the University of Wisconsin–Madison to become the new leader of the Pro Arte String Quartet (recorded as the first Quartet in Residence at any U.S. university). He was also granted a full professorship. From then through the 1960s, he frequently performed with fellow artist-in-residence Gunnar Johansen, a Danish-born pianist who played for Franz Liszt and Ferruccio Busoni and studied with Egon Petri.

In the 1950s, he began to tour in Europe again as a recitalist. He became a member of the faculty at the Internationale Ferienkurse für Neue Musik in Darmstadt, Germany, along with his close friends and long-time associates Eduard Steuermann and Theodor Adorno. Except for one year (1956) spent in Darmstadt, he remained active in Madison until reaching the mandatory retirement age in 1966.

At that time he was invited by Gunther Schuller to become head of the Chamber Music department at the New England Conservatory in Boston. He remained on the faculty until the end of his life. During the summers of 1974 through 1977, he also taught chamber music performance at the annual Schoenberg Seminars in Mödling, Austria near Vienna.

== Marriage and family ==
Kolisch was married in the 1930s to Josefa Rosanska (b. 1904, d. 1986), a concert pianist. The marriage ended in divorce. In the early 1940s, he married Lorna Freedman, (1917–2006), a professional violinist and violist.

== Legacy and honors ==
- The papers of Rudolf Kolisch are held in the Manuscript Department of the Houghton Library at Harvard University.
- The Library of Congress Music Division holds the Rudolf Kolisch collection, a gift from Lorna Kolisch in 1983. The collection contains valuable correspondence between Kolisch and composers Arnold Schoenberg, Alban Berg, and Anton Webern.
