= Slovin =

Slovin is a surname. Notable people with the surname include:

- Hamutal Slovin (born 1967), Israeli neuroscientist
- Rochelle Slovin, American theater actress and museum director
