= Gregor Collins =

American actor, writer and producer (born 1976)

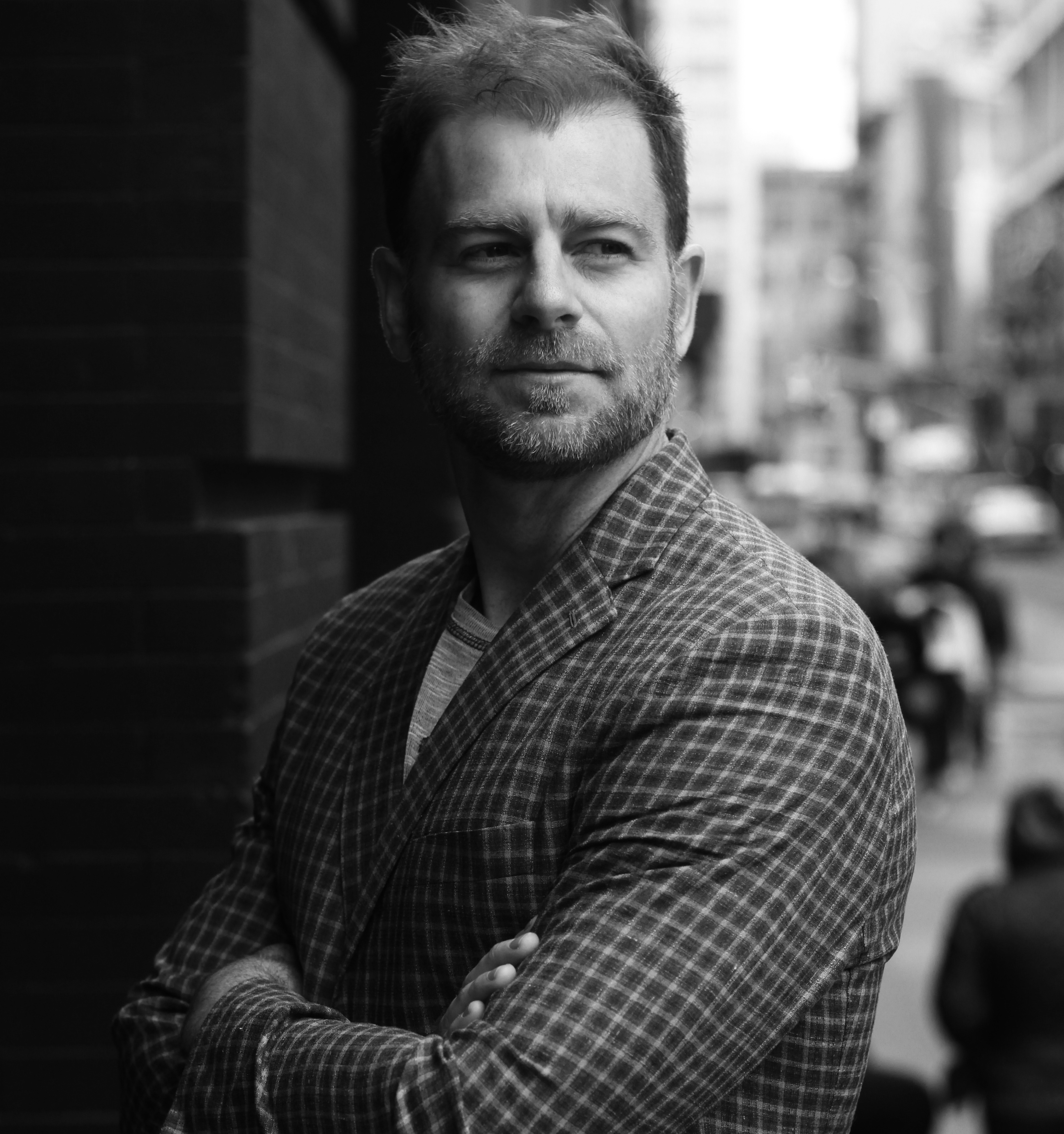
- Collins in Soho in 2019
- Born: Mountain View, California
- Education: Florida State University
- Occupations: Author; Producer
- Notable work: The Accidental Caregiver; Goodbye Promise
- Website: https://www.gregorcollins.com/

Gregor Collins is an American author, speaker, producer and former actor, most known for writing The Accidental Caregiver, a memoir about the three years he spent with Maria Altmann.

== Career ==
Collins moved to Los Angeles in 2000 to pursue a career in entertainment. He worked his way into producing various reality television shows such as Blind Date, Celebrity Mole: Yucatán, Girls Gone Wild, Ripley's Believe it or Not, E! at the Emmy Awards, Welcome to Myrtle Manor and Counting Cars. In 2004 he began to pursue professional acting, eventually performing on stage, in television and in independent films, landing lead roles in the indie feature Night Before the Wedding and the improvised feature Goodbye Promise, which the Los Angeles Times called a "simple, richly emotional look at a failed actor's introspective last days in Hollywood."

In October 2014 Collins moved to the Murray Hill, Manhattan section of New York City, living with and serving as a caregiver to Austrian painter Ruth Rogers-Altmann while he prepared a stage production of his book The Accidental Caregiver, about his experience caring for Rogers-Altmann's cousin Maria Altmann.

Collins has written essays about Ruth and Maria for The Guardian, Focus, Huffington Post and others, and has been a regular contributor to CinemaEditor since 2013.

== The Accidental Caregiver ==
In 2012 Collins released the memoir The Accidental Caregiver: How I Met, Loved and Lost Legendary Holocaust Refugee Maria Altmann, detailing his chance meeting and unusual bond with Jewish émigré Maria Altmann, culminating in her death in early 2011.

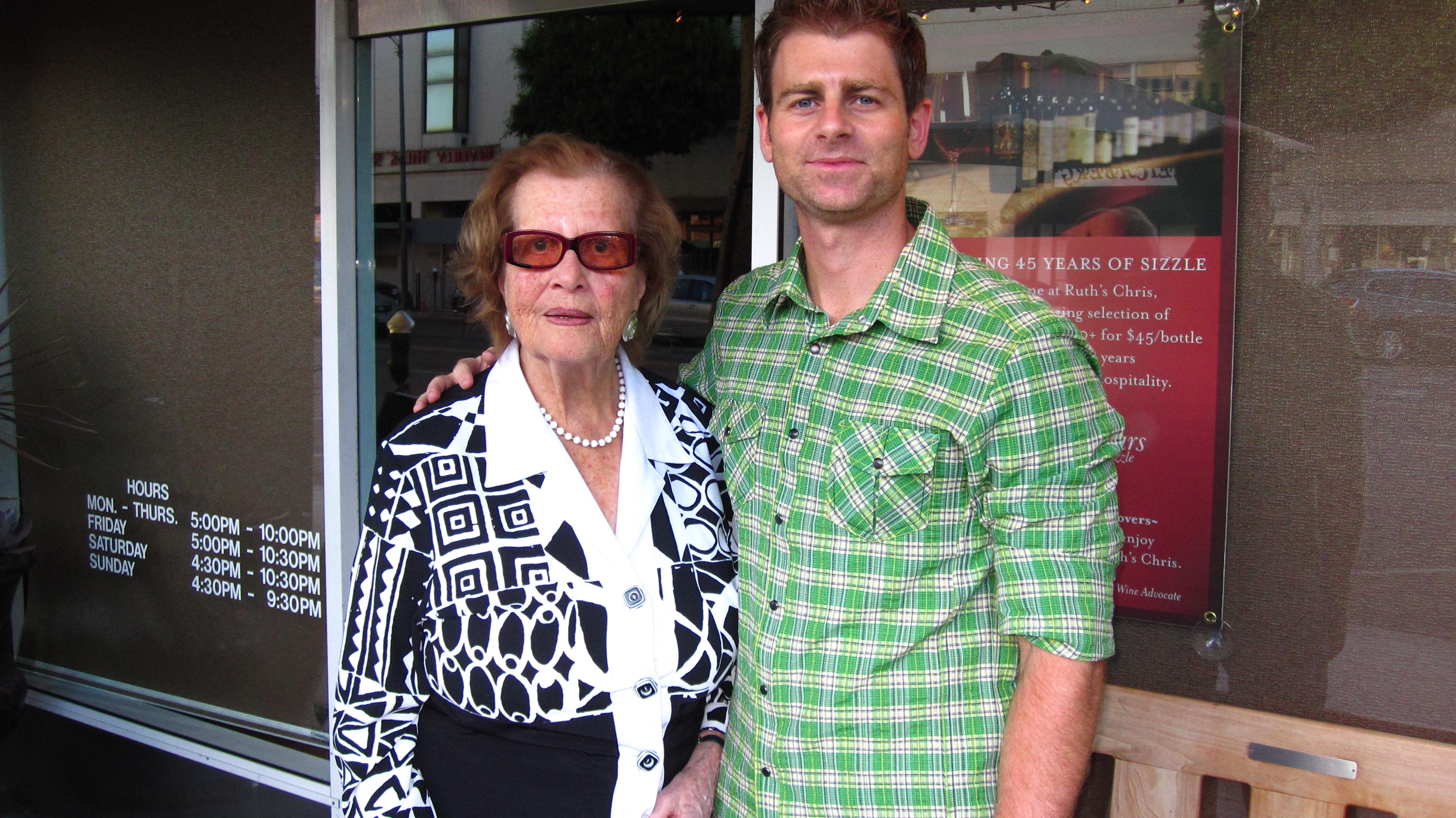
Collins and Maria Altmann in 2010

In 2018 Collins was the keynote speaker for events called Love, Maria in New York City, Miami, Melbourne, Sydney and Perth—all sponsored by the Women's International Zionist Organization—and in 2019 was the keynote speaker for an event called Te Amo, Maria at the Jewish Cultural and Community Center in San Miguel de Allende, Mexico.

The Accidental Caregiver Part 2 was published in 2020 by Balboa Press, a division of Hay House, and follows Collins' life after Maria's death and his accidental speaking tour across Australia with WIZO. As of 2024, Collins is working on a third and final installment of the caregiver series.

== Stage plays ==
The Accidental Caregiver stageplay premiered at Playwrights Horizons' Robert Moss Theater in New York City on January 26, 2015, and was directed by British theatre director Alice Kornitzer. The play also had a staged reading at the Austrian Cultural Forum New York on June 25, 2015, which was directed by Collins. Actors Christian Scheider and Rochelle Slovin read the parts of Gregor and Maria, respectively.

In November 2015 Collins wrote the Oscar Wilde-inspired dark comedy Pentonville for the Manhattan Repertory Theatre in New York, which was directed by Jonathan Stuart Cerullo. In June 2016 Collins created, co-wrote and co-produced the black comedy series Stories for Ali Farahnakian and the People's Improv Theater in New York.

In January 2017 Collins' play The Secret World Inside Me was developed and performed as a staged reading at the IATI Theater in New York.

== Personal life ==
Collins resides in Arlington, Virginia and has a Vizsla named Lucy.

== Filmography ==
Year	Title	Role	Notes
2004	Passions	Bartender	TV-series
2005	Creepies 2	Jeff Quest	Film
2005	Manhater	Jackson Botero	Film
2005	The Witch's Sabbath	Derek	Film
2006	The World's Astonishing News	Prison Guard	TV-series
2006	Blood Legend	Clark	Film
2007	Ned's Declassified School Survival Guide	Bouncer	TV-Series
2007	Ocean's Thirteen	Stickman	Film
2007	Loveless in Los Angeles	Peter	Film
2009	Night Before the Wedding	Bronco	Film
2009	Chloe and Keith's Wedding	Zach	Film
2011	Urban Jungle Dating Dilemmas	Matt	TV-Series
2012	Goodbye Promise	Matt	Film
