= The Accidental Caregiver =

Memoir

- Author: Gregor Collins
- Language: English
- Subject: Memoir, intergenerational relation, art restituion
- Genre: Non-fiction
- Publisher: Bloch-Bauer Books
- Publication date: 2012
- Publication place: United States
- Pages: 362
- ISBN: 9780985865405
- OCLC: 820878705

The Accidental Caregiver: How I Met, Loved, and Lost Legendary Holocaust Refugee Maria Altmann is a 2012 memoir by Gregor Collins, recounting the three years he was a caregiver for Maria Altmann, as well as a stageplay, which premiered in New York City in 2015.

== Book ==
In late 2007 a friend of Collins's, Tom Trudeau, answered an ad on Craigslist for a caregiver to a 92-year-old woman from Austria who lived in Cheviot Hills, Los Angeles. Trudeau mentioned to Collins he had taken the job, moved into her bungalow on Danalda Drive, and urged him to visit. But Collins was focused on his acting career. A few weeks later, in January 2008, another caregiver quit, leaving Trudeau as the lady's sole caregiver. The family asked Trudeau if he knew anyone who could immediately fill the vacant position, and he asked Collins again, who eventually agreed to take the job. The lady was Holocaust refugee Maria Altmann.

Aside from their day-to-day relationship chronicled in journal-entry-style chapters, the book depicts Maria's childhood in pre-Hitler Vienna as a member of the influential Bloch-Bauer family, and their relationship with the painter Gustav Klimt, who was regularly commissioned by Maria's Uncle Ferdinand Bloch-Bauer to paint portraits of his wife Adele Bloch-Bauer, a prominent Jewish patron of the arts. It also depicts Altmann and her family’s relationships with an array of figures such as Joan Sutherland, Walter Slezak, Hedy Lamarr, Placido Domingo, Danny Thomas, Gary Cooper, Ezio Pinza, Paul Henreid and others, and Altmann and her husband Fritz's escape from Austria during the Anschluss, fleeing through Holland, England and Massachusetts, and their eventual nesting in Los Angeles.

In 2012, a year and a half after Altmann's death, Collins published his book to commemorate the 37 months they spent together, meticulously detailing their chance meeting and unusual bond, culminating in Altmann's death in early 2011. The book received favorable reviews in the US, as well as in the Australian, German and Austrian press.

The book was also sold at the Neue Galerie New York, where the Portrait of Adele Bloch-Bauer I remains in permanent collection.

In 2015 a translated version of the book was published in Poland.

== Public Speaking ==
Collins has spoken at various public venues around the world sharing his experience as Altmann's caregiver, including Richmond's Tuckahoe Woman's Club, The Brotherhood Synagogue in Greenwich Village, Herndon ArtSpace, Austrian Cultural Forum New York, the San Miguel de Allende Jewish Cultural Center, and in private residences in multiple countries.

He has been the keynote speaker at functions at Crown Melbourne, Central Synagogue, Sydney, and the Bendat Centre in Perth, all sponsored by the Women's International Zionist Organization.

== Stageplay ==
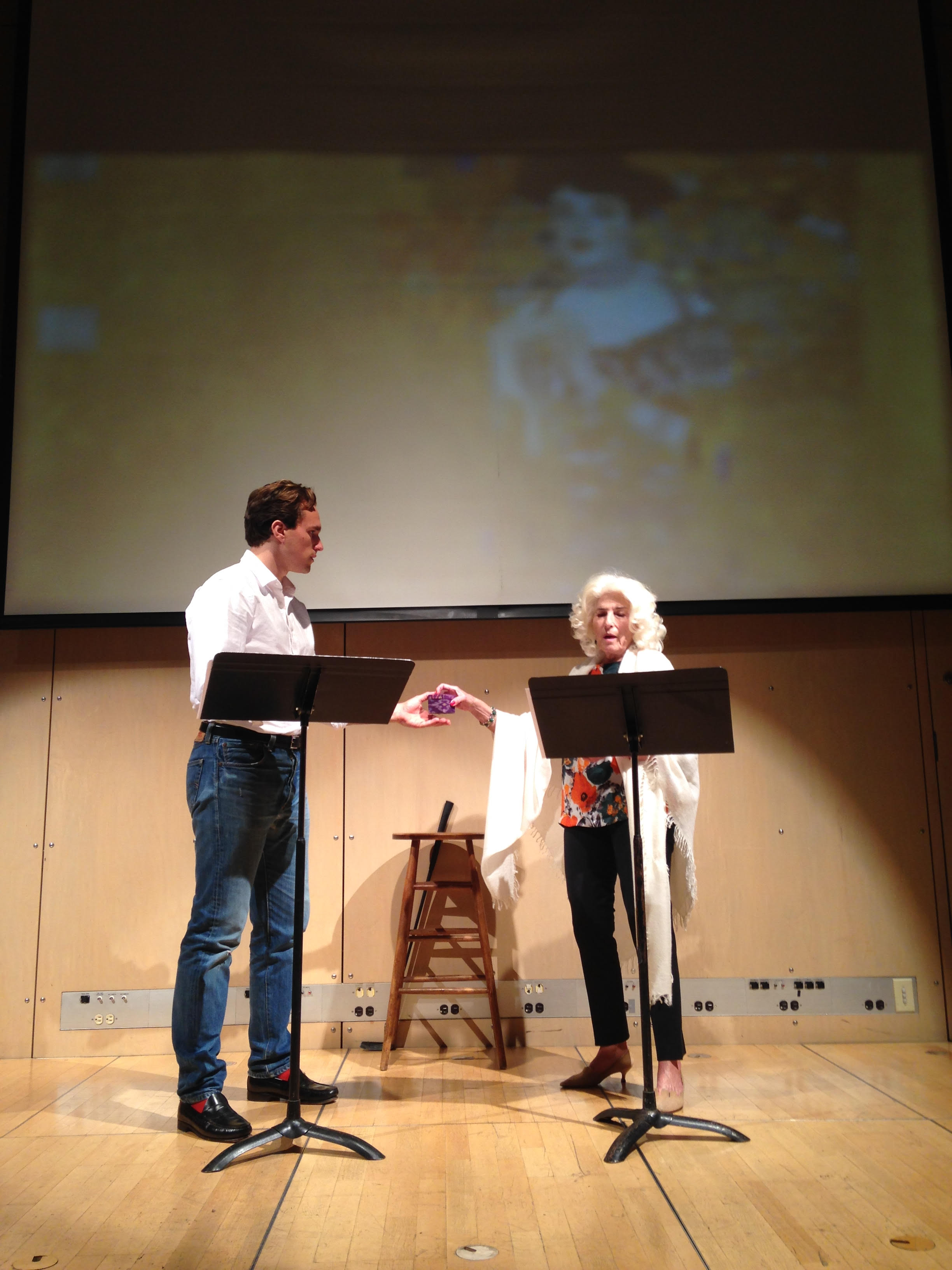
Christian Scheider and Rochelle Slovin in a staged reading at the Austrian Cultural Forum New York in 2015

The Accidental Caregiver stageplay premiered at the Robert Moss Theater in New York City on January 26, 2015, and was directed by British theatre director Alice Kornitzer. The play was also presented as a staged reading at the Austrian Cultural Forum New York on June 25, 2015. Directed by Collins, Actors Christian Scheider and Rochelle Slovin read the parts of Gregor and Maria, respectively.

== Sequel ==
The book's sequel, The Accidental Caregiver Part 2, was released in July 2020 by Balboa Press, a division of Hay House. As of 2024, Collins is working on a third and final installment to the series.

== See also ==
- Art theft and looting during World War II

== Editions ==
- The Accidental Caregiver, Bloch-Bauer Books, ISBN 9780985865405
- "Kobieta ze złota. Moje życie z Marią Altmann", Wydawnictwo Replika, ISBN 978-83-7674-446-9
