= Alexandra Wescourt =

English actress

Alexandra Michele Wescourt (born 12 July 1975) is an English actress.

== Early life ==
Wescourt was born in London, England, the daughter of Gordon Wescourt Sr. and Gillian Margaret Elvins. Her father, an American residing in Los Angeles, California, was the son of Lithuanian-Jewish immigrants and made a career as an actor. Her mother was a vicar's daughter who had met Gordon in London, in the early 1970s. Gillian was a member of the famous dance troupe, The Bluebell Girls in Paris in the 1960s, who then went into modeling and performing in television shows. Wescourt spent the early part of her childhood living in Los Angeles before returning to London.

== Acting career ==
Wescourt studied at the Webber Douglas Academy of Dramatic Art in Kensington, London, graduating in 1998. Her first part out of acting school was to play Shelley Bower in the Liverpool-based television drama Brookside in the summer of 1999. She received much publicity from her characters' lesbian love affairs. Despite being offered a contract renewal she decided to quit the series in the Winter of 2000 to pursue a career in America.

== American life ==
Wescourt settled into her new life stateside and found roles in television commercials before landing the part of Gwen in Bug. Wescourt's biggest role came in the vampire thriller Dracula III Legacy, starring alongside established actors such as Jason Scott Lee, Jason London, Roy Scheider and Rutger Hauer. In 2006 she landed the role of Dr. Baden in the TV thriller Watch Over Me, before appearing as a news anchor in an episode of Ugly Betty in 2007.
