= Stephen Billington =

English actor (born 1964)

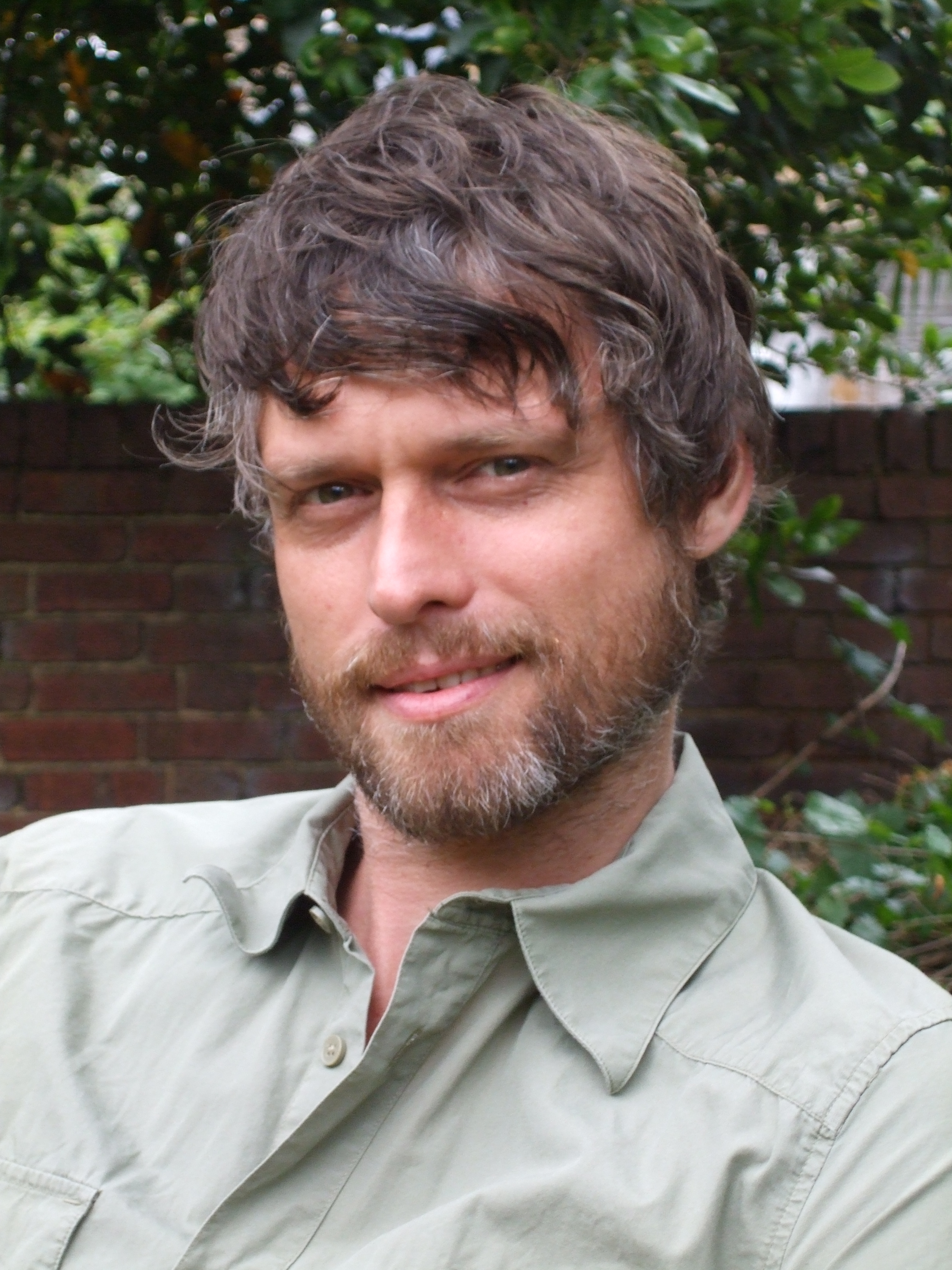
- Billington in 2008
- Born: 10 December 1964 (age 61); Farnworth, Lancashire, England
- Occupation: Actor
- Years active: 1994–present

Stephen Billington (born 10 December 1964) is an English actor. He is known for his role as Greg Kelly in the ITV1 soap opera Coronation Street, for which he won the 1999 British Soap Award for Villain of the Year.

== Career ==
Born in Farnworth, Lancashire, Billington trained at the Drama Centre London, and was an unknown when chosen from hundreds who auditioned to play the lead part of Lysander Hawkley in The Man Who Made Husbands Jealous (1997). He has gone on to work with many leading film directors, including Peter Greenaway, Franco Zeffirelli, and Mel Gibson. He also now teaches at the London School of Dramatic Art, the Drama Centre London, the Method Studio, London, and the City Literary Institute.

In 2011 he took to the stage to play John Proctor in Arthur Miller's The Crucible at the York Theatre Royal. In 2013, he joined the cast of Channel 4 soap opera, Hollyoaks playing Danny Lomax.

== Personal life ==
By 2026, Billington was attempting to launch a bed and breakfast establishment in Piedmont, Italy. His efforts are documented in some episodes of Channel 4's daytime lifestyle television series A New Life in the Sun.

== Filmography ==
=== Film ===
Year	Title	Role	Notes
1995	Braveheart	Phillip	
2002	Resident Evil	Mr. White	
2002	Callas Forever	Brendan	
2003	Dracula II: Ascension	Dracula II	
2004	The Tulse Luper Suitcases, Part 3: From Sark to the Finish	Tulse Luper	
2005	The Prophecy: Uprising	Ion	
2005	Dracula III: Legacy	Dracula II	
2005	A Life in Suitcases	Tulse Luper	
2007	Northern Cowboys	Deano	
2007	Oh Happy Day	David	
2007	Exitz	Theo	
2007	The Un-Gone	Julian Salinger	Short
2010	Exorcismus	Christopher	
2015	Lake Placid vs. Anaconda	Beach	
2015	Angel	Blunt	

=== Television ===
Year	Title	Role	Notes
1994	Space Precinct	Ross	1 episode
1995	The Buccaneers	Lieutenant James	1 episode
1995	Out of the Blue	P.C. Alex Holder	6 episodes
1997	The Man Who Made Husbands Jealous	Lysander Hawkley	3 episodes
1997	Rules of Engagement	Gary	Television film
1998	Jonathan Creek	Neville Bruce	2 episodes
1998–1999	Coronation Street	Greg Kelly	Regular role
1999	Highlander: The Raven	Derrick Markham	1 episode
2001	Queen of Swords	Bernardo	1 episode
2001	Relic Hunter	Palmer	1 episode
2002	Inquisition	The healer / prisoner	Television film
2002	Young Arthur	Lord Vortigen	Television film
2006–2013	Doctors	Dutch / Colin Tierney	3 episodes
2010	Casualty	Edward Thurlow / Edward Furlow	11 episodes
2013	Invasion Roswell	Burkis	Television film
2013–2014	Hollyoaks	Danny Lomax	Regular role
2017	Armchair Detectives	DI Knight	20 episodes
2026	A New Life in the Sun	Himself	Lifestyle television series

== Awards and nominations ==
Year	Award	Category	Nominated work	Result	Ref.
1999	British Soap Awards	Villain of the Year	Coronation Street	Won	
