= Money Plays =

1998 film by Frank D. Gilroy

- Written by: Frank D. Gilroy
- Directed by: Frank D. Gilroy
- Starring: Roy Scheider; Sonia Braga
- Music by: Philip Marshall
- Country of origin: United States
- Original language: English

Production
- Producers: Terri Pappas; Wayne Rogers; Henry Schleiff; William Tannen
- Cinematography: Ric Waite
- Editor: Bill Johnson
- Running time: 92 minutes
- Production companies: Money Plays Company Inc. Showtime Networks

Original release
- Release: August 21, 1998

Money Plays (stylized as Money Play$) is a 1998 American drama TV movie written and directed by Frank D. Gilroy and starring Roy Scheider and Sonia Braga.

== Plot ==
When a customer dies, prostitute Irene discovers his money vest containing half a million dollars. She asks her regular client Johnny to help her double the money at the casino where he works in order to return the money to some gangsters and keep the rest.

== Cast ==
- Roy Scheider as Johnny
- Sonia Braga as Irene
- Jon Polito as Lou Spano
- Carmine Caridi as Victor
- Seth Jaffe as Carmine
- Elisabeth Lund as Stacy
- John Durren as Jester
- John Buchanan as Dealer #1
- Ken Coleman as Boxman
- Michael Kelsey as Dealer #2
- Steve May as Casino Executive
- Vince Del'Ostia as Casino Manager
- Michael Flynn as The Shylock
- Nancy Gentry as Cashier
- Rick Bugg as Motel Clerk
- Donré Sampson as Hood #1
- Zane Parker as Hood #2
- Fenton Quinn as Hood #3
- Josephine Thaut as Woman Tourist
- David Jensen as Cab Driver
- Laura Rogers as Kitty
- Michelle Wilson as Alice
- Ivan Crosland as Maitre'd
- Geoffrey Bennett as Young Man
- Sue Jarrad as Woman Shopper
- Christian Scheider as Gilly
- Jeff Olson as Photographer
- Dennis Saylor as Coroner
- Michael Scott as Minister
- Rita Bankhead as Mrs. Williams
- Daniel Dudley as Stickman
- Teddy Costanzo as Dealer #3
- Paul Mugerian as Tourist

== Reception ==
The website veronicasuperguide.nl gave the film a rating of 2 out of 5 stars, writing, "The twisty plot with more coincidences than logic does not do any justice to the dramatic core of the film, namely the relationship of the two jaded lovers. This very thing could have still made this routine thriller interesting, but Gilroy barely pays attention to it."
