= Dracula II: Ascension =

2003 vampire film by Patrick Lussier

- DVD cover
- Directed by: Patrick Lussier
- Written by: Joel Soisson; Patrick Lussier
- Produced by: W.K. Border; Joel Soisson
- Starring: Jason Scott Lee; Diane Neal; Jason London; Craig Sheffer; Roy Scheider; Brande Roderick
- Cinematography: Douglas Milsome
- Edited by: Lisa Romaniw
- Music by: Kevin Kliesch (Note: Original themes by Marco Beltrami.)
- Production companies: Castel Film Romania; Neo Art & Logic
- Distributed by: Dimension Home Video
- Release date: June 7, 2003
- Running time: 81 minutes
- Countries: United States; Romania
- Language: English
- Budget: $3.2 million

Dracula II: Ascension is a 2003 direct-to-video American-Romanian horror film, directed by Patrick Lussier. It stars Jason Scott Lee, Stephen Billington and Diane Neal. Filmed entirely in Romania by Castel Film Studios, the film is the sequel to Dracula 2000. It was released direct-to-video on June 7, 2003. (VHS cassette has a print date of May 24, 2003)

The film was followed by a sequel, Dracula III: Legacy (2005).

== Plot ==
The film opens with a priest, Uffizi, hunting down a pair of twin female vampires. He manages to kill them, but not before one of them bites and infects him with vampirism. As the sun rises, he exposes himself to sunlight, which manages to halt the infection.

Elizabeth Blaine, a medical student working at the New Orleans morgue, receives Dracula's corpse from her friend and co-worker Luke, following the events of the first film. Elizabeth examines the body and accidentally pricks her finger on a fang. As they begin to believe that the body is a vampire, the two argue about what to do with it. Elizabeth calls her husband Lowell, a professor at her college, who is suffering from an ultimately fatal degenerative sickness. Luke also gets a call from someone claiming to be a wealthy investor, who wants to fund research into the mysterious corpse for the secrets of immortality. Father Uffizi arrives at the morgue to grant Dracula absolution after the Church learns that Dracula is in fact Judas Iscariot. Elizabeth and Luke manage to escape the morgue, with Lowell instructing them to take the body to his secluded family home to conduct the experiment.

Elizabeth and Luke invite fellow students, Kenny and Tanya, to assist with the experiment. Lowell instructs them to submerge the body in a bathtub full of blood. After some time passes, without results, Dracula suddenly emerges from the tub in a frenzy. The students attempt to hold him down, but Tanya is pulled into the tub and pushed out the window to her death. The benefactor, Eric, arrives and manages to hold the vampire back with a modified light gun. Although Tanya's death disheartens some of the team, they decide to continue with the research after burying her. Two police officers arrive the next morning after receiving a call about strange noises from last night. One officer finds Uffizi and, seeing the blood from the night before, attempts to arrest him. Tanya, revealed to have been turned into a vampire, kills one officer and goes after Uffizi. He subdues her and exposes her to sunlight, killing her. Uffizi later goes to a local church and flagellates himself, with the sunlight on him to hold back his vampirism.

The team moves the body to an abandoned pool where they chain him up and subdue him with ultraviolet light. As they study him, Luke starts to have doubts that Dracula will be held indefinitely and begins to surround the vampire with folkloric wards. Meanwhile, Elizabeth feels increasingly strange as the infection in her grows, as does her attraction and bond to Dracula. Having become greedy with the prospect of immortality, Kenny injects himself with Dracula's blood and becomes a vampire, setting out to feed with Eric in pursuit. The others go back to see Lowell injured and bleeding in the pool, having been enticed by Dracula to do so. In desperation, Elizabeth takes more blood from Dracula and injects him, hoping that he will be healed. Kenny kills a woman, making her undead like himself. Before he can kill Eric, Uffizi arrives and decapitates him. He warns Eric that he is coming for the body and leaves to kill the female vampire.

The injection works, and Lowell is able to walk again. Returning to Dracula, Lowell reveals that there was no investor and that he had used Elizabeth and the others to cure himself. He and Eric had concocted the ruse to become rich off the immortality serum. Elizabeth splashes holy water onto his face in anger and he runs off in pain. Uffizi arrives and meets Lowell, now a vampire, before killing him. After recovering some of his strength, Dracula breaks free of his restraints and bites Eric's face off. He effortlessly passes through the wards and escapes. Eric is turned into a faceless vampire and attacks the group, but is killed with holy water by Luke. Uffizi tells Elizabeth, now on the verge of becoming a vampire herself, to enter the sunlight and burn away her vampirism. Luke attempts to bring Elizabeth outside, but she resists and disappears, having already been turned.

Uffizi catches up with Dracula, who taunts him with the knowledge that Elizabeth will simply die, and Uffizi knows it. Dracula fights Uffizi, but his weakened state allows Uffizi to get the upper hand. The priest manages to subdue Dracula and begins the rite of absolution. Dracula then taunts Uffizi with visions of Christ's betrayal by him and crucifixion. Before Uffizi can finish him off, Elizabeth appears and wounds the priest. She leaves with Dracula, who lets Uffizi live, knowing that he will continue to hunt him.

== Cast ==
- Jason Scott Lee as Uffizi
- Jason London as Luke
- Khary Payton as Kenny
- Craig Sheffer as Lowell
- Diane Neal as Elizabeth Blaine
- Brande Roderick as Tanya
- Tom Kane as the voice of Cartoon Voice of Doctor
- John Light as Eric
- Stephen Billington as Judas Iscariot/Dracula
- Nick Phillips as Officer Smith
- John Sharian as Officer Hodge
- Roy Scheider as Cardinal Siqueros
- David J. Francis as Jesus Christ

== Production ==
=== Development ===
Despite Dracula 2000 being a box office bomb, Dimension Films approached filmmakers Patrick Lussier and Joel Soisson for a sequel. The pair decided to use their original pitch for Dracula 2000, where Dracula is captured and studied. The character of Father Uffizi was initially a part of Dracula 2000, but was ultimately taken out in later drafts. Lussier and Soisson would write each scene individually and trade their scenes for revisions. The filmmakers opted not to include the year in the title as neither were "overly enamored" with the title of the previous film. Stephen Billington was cast as Dracula in place of Gerard Butler due to scheduling conflicts.

=== Filming ===
Production took place in the fall in Romania, concurrently with Dracula III: Legacy. Roy Scheider shot all of his scenes for both films in a single day.

== Reception ==
Critical reaction to Dracula II: Ascension has been mixed to negative. On Rotten Tomatoes, Dracula II: Ascension holds an approval rating of 0% from seven reviews.

Rebecca Isenberg of Entertainment Weekly said: "Dracula II is dripping with clichéd scare tactics, from abandoned houses to bathtubs filled with blood, [and] death scenes are equally predictable". John Puccio of DVD Town said: "The movie is a tired collection of tired clichés bound together by tired characters in tired roles. By the time the eighty-five minutes of movie are over, you'll be pretty tired, too. Nothing happens that is in the least bit frightening. ... [T]he filmmakers splatter the screen with buckets of blood, severed heads, and gory, close-up autopsies, but while all this may be gross and disgusting, it's not scary".

Patrick Naugle of DVD Verdict said: "In Dracula II: Ascension, co-writer/director Patrick Lussier has crafted an only mediocre sequel that is sub-par in every respect: acting, plot, and special effects. In place of an interesting story is a movie that takes the character of Dracula, binds him to a cross, and keeps him locked up for most of the feature's running time. While the filmmakers' intentions were good, I can't really recommend this sequel to horror fans looking for true cinematic terror". Craig Villinger of Digital Retribution called the film "a disappointing sequel and a disappointing vampire film in general", adding: "Despite the obviously limited budget, Lussier has tried to make a visually impressive feature, and to an extent he succeeds, but ultimately the film is dragged down by an uneventful script, poor performances, and a terrible ending which offers the viewer no closure whatsoever".

== See also ==
- Dracula III: Legacy
- Vampire film
