= Rochelle Slovin =

American actress

Rochelle Slovin is an American stage actress, and founding director of Museum of the Moving Image in Astoria, Queens, New York City, which she led for 30 years, from 1981 until 2011. A native New Yorker, Slovin was educated at Cornell University and the Columbia Business School. She began her career in the 1960s as a performer in New York’s avant-garde theater, appearing often at La Mama Experimental Theatre Club and other off-off-Broadway venues.

Slovin has lectured internationally on museum planning, exhibition philosophy, and the use of audiovisual media in museums. She is a former chair of the Cultural Institutions Group, a member of the Board of Directors of The Wooster Group, and currently serves on the President’s Council of Cornell Women. She lives in Manhattan with her husband, the philosopher Edmund Leites.

On January 26, 2015, Slovin portrayed Holocaust refugee Maria Altmann in the stage version of the memoir The Accidental Caregiver by Gregor Collins, which premiered at the Robert Moss Theater in New York City. Slovin also played Altmann in a staged reading at the Austrian Cultural Forum New York on June 25, 2015, opposite Actor Christian Scheider.
