= The Murderer =

- Short story by Ray Bradbury
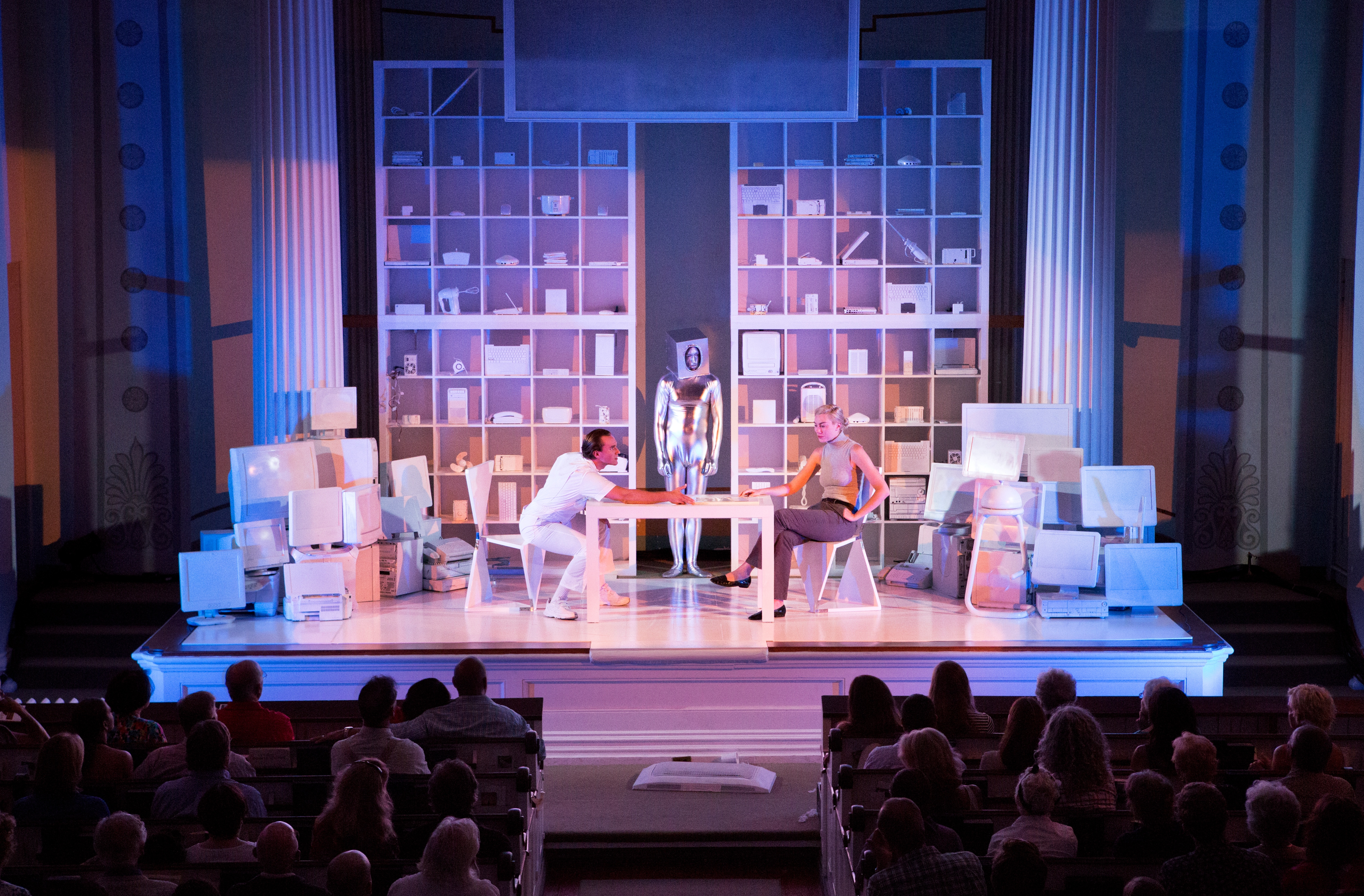
- Image from the 2013 theatrical adaption.
- Country: United States
- Language: English
- Genre: Short Story

Publication
- Published in: The Golden Apples of the Sun
- Publication type: Anthology
- Publisher: Doubleday
- Media type: Print
- Publication date: 1953
- Pages: 375 pp.

"The Murderer" (1953) is a short story by Ray Bradbury, published in his collection The Golden Apples of the Sun.

== Plot summary ==
The scene is set in an unspecified future, in an apparently sterile and clinical building. There is music coming from every direction; each person, it seems, is listening to music, talking on a phone, using an intercom, or communicating constantly in some other way. Most people seem to be engaged in several of these activities at the same time.

A psychiatrist exits the noisy environment to confront a patient confined to a small safe-room. The psychiatrist notes that its patient has ripped the radio out of the wall to silence it. The room seems unnaturally quiet to the psychiatrist, yet the patient seems perfectly at ease, even happy. The patient, Albert Brock, calls himself "The Murderer", and demonstrates his murderous ability by destroying the psychiatrist's wrist radio.

Questioning reveals that the man had one day been driven mad by the constant expectations of communication inflicted upon him by society - his wife and children could speak with him whenever they wished, wherever they were; any person could call on him, and many did, simply to make use of their communications devices. He gives a striking image of a world in which humans are constantly bombarded by music, advertisement, propaganda and communication. He then describes his revelation; that if he shut off his phone, he could not be bothered by it. When he arrived home on that day, he discovered his wife, frantic at being out of touch with him for so long. This apparently drives home to him their terrible addiction to technology of communication. He begins to destroy things - his phone, his wrist radio, the television, any thing that could disrupt the peace he seeks. The man regrets only destroying the Insinkerator, which he used to mangle another piece of equipment. The Insinkerator, a sink drain disposal, he says, was a machine with a good solid purpose which did not disturb him with its functions, did not demand his attention, which only functioned when he asked it to.

The man then describes his wonderful state of calm and relaxation, moments of total freedom of all responsibility and worry inflicted upon him by machines. The psychiatrist makes due note of this, prompting him with questions, even seeming to perhaps understand what the man feels. At the end of The Murderer's tale, however, the psychiatrist steps back into the world of music and talk, quickly relaying information on the man's condition to an aide over another communication device, and re-immerses himself into the glare of technology's power.

== Adaptations ==
When Bradbury re-worked this story for his TV program The Ray Bradbury Theater, he changed the ending of the story. In the revised version, the psychiatrist returns to his office and, barraged by noise and electronics, destroys his newly replaced "lapel phone" and asks his secretary for a chocolate milkshake (to pour into his fax machine).

The story was adapted as a dark comedy/musical one-act play, marking the first collaboration of actor/writer Christian Scheider and artist Tucker Marder. It first premiered in August 2013 in Sag Harbor, NY. The cast consisted of Christian Scheider (The Murderer), Madeline Wise (The Psychiatrist), and Britt Mosley (Technology). The Production was directed by Tucker Marder.
