= Dracula 2000 =

2000 film by Patrick Lussier

- Theatrical release poster
- Directed by: Patrick Lussier
- Screenplay by: Joel Soisson
- Story by: Joel Soisson; Patrick Lussier
- Based on: Dracula by Bram Stoker
- Produced by: W.K. Border; Joel Soisson
- Starring: Jonny Lee Miller; Justine Waddell; Gerard Butler; Colleen Fitzpatrick; Jennifer Esposito; Danny Masterson; Jeri Ryan; Lochlyn Munro; Sean Patrick Thomas; Omar Epps; Christopher Plummer
- Cinematography: Peter Pau
- Edited by: Patrick Lussier; Peter Devaney Flanagan
- Music by: Marco Beltrami
- Production companies: Dimension Films; Neo Art & Logic
- Distributed by: Dimension Films
- Release date: December 22, 2000
- Running time: 99 minutes
- Country: United States
- Language: English
- Budget: $54 million
- Box office: $47.1 million

Dracula 2000 (also known as Wes Craven Presents: Dracula 2000 and internationally as Dracula 2001) is a 2000 American supernatural horror film co-written and directed by Patrick Lussier, produced by Joel Soisson, and starring Gerard Butler in the title role along with Christopher Plummer, Jonny Lee Miller, Justine Waddell, Omar Epps, Colleen Fitzpatrick, Jeri Ryan, and Jennifer Esposito. Its plot follows Count Dracula, who, after having escaped captivity by Abraham Van Helsing over a century following the events of the novel Dracula, arrives in New Orleans, Louisiana in the 21st century and seeks out Mary Heller, the modern-day daughter of Van Helsing. The screenplay incorporates a theological subplot regarding Dracula's origins, revealing him to be Judas Iscariot.

Principal photography of Dracula 2000 took place on location in New Orleans and Toronto in the summer of 2000. The film had a rushed post-production process, with reshoots and editing occurring in the fall of 2000, shortly before the studio's December release deadline. Dracula 2000 was released theatrically in the United States and Canada on December 22, 2000. It received largely negative reviews from critics, and was a box-office bomb, grossing $47.1 million against a $54 million budget.

Dracula 2000 was followed by two direct-to-video sequels, Ascension in 2003 and Legacy in 2005. Series director Lussier and Joel Soisson, who co-wrote all three films, created a plot for a fourth film and discussed releasing it theatrically, but the film was not produced.

== Plot ==
In 2000 London, wealthy antiquary Matthew Van Helsing runs an antique shop on the site of Carfax Abbey, a business inherited from his grandfather, the Dutch physician and polymath Abraham Van Helsing. Solina, Van Helsing’s American secretary, orchestrates a heist with her boyfriend, Marcus, and their crew—Trick, Nightshade, Dax, and Eddie—to infiltrate the shop's fortified high-tech vault in search of riches. Instead, they discover a sealed silver coffin. While attempting to open the coffin, Eddie and Dax are impaled by spikes, spraying the coffin with blood and alerting Van Helsing to their presence. Assuming the coffin must contain Van Helsing's valuables, the group escapes with it aboard a plane to New Orleans, and Van Helsing pursues them with his apprentice, Simon Sheppard, in tow.

Aboard their plane, Nightshade unlocks the coffin, revealing the withered body of Dracula. Having been awakened by the blood on his coffin, Dracula attacks and vampirizes Solina and her group. Rejuvenated, Dracula shares a telepathic link with Mary Heller, an English expatriate who sees him as he sees her. Following a Louisiana swamp crash, Dracula emerges to vampirize anchorwoman Valerie Sharpe after killing her cameraman, while local authorities take the other victims to a makeshift morgue. He then travels to New Orleans to find Mary. Haunted by dreams of an unknown Dracula, Mary clings to her resentment toward the father she blames for her late mother’s mental decline.

Upon arrival, Van Helsing and Simon thin the vampire ranks, but Dracula infiltrates a police station to claim Solina, leaving a trail of slaughtered officers in their wake. Van Helsing confesses he is the 19th-century original; having survived since Dracula's 1897 attacks, (Note: These attacks correspond to the events of Bram Stoker’s 1897 novel, Dracula, which serves as the canonical backstory for the film.) he has cheated death for over a hundred years by harvesting the vampire's blood via leeches and hiding behind his own family tree. Despite a century of effort, Van Helsing cannot kill Dracula, the primordial vampire who reviles God, silver, and Christian cultures. Conceived after his prolongation began, Mary is Van Helsing’s contemporary daughter—a child born into a shared bloodline with the vampire himself. Petrified by his true identity, Van Helsing’s wife fled with Mary to escape both the monster and the man, fearing the latent vampirism taking root in her daughter's blood; however, Van Helsing secretly tracked their every move and grieved in silence after his wife's death.

Dracula is led to Mary's home by her friend Lucy Westerman, whom he seduces and vampirizes. There, he confronts and kills Van Helsing. On her return, Mary finds her father's carcass and is ambushed by Dracula and his brides: Solina, Valerie, and Lucy. Simon rushes Mary into a church to escape Dracula, but the vampire easily invades the sanctuary. Though they escape into a cemetery, Dracula intercepts them and abducts Mary, craving a born equal over a mere sired thrall.

On a rooftop, Dracula transforms Mary and reveals that he is Judas Iscariot, the Apostle who betrayed Jesus Christ to the Sanhedrin for a bribe of thirty pieces of silver. After Jesus was crucified, Judas hanged himself in contrition, only to be cursed by God with eternal life as the world’s first vampire. Dracula blames Jesus for his damnation because he had foreknowledge of his betrayal and failed to avert the prophecy. Seeking revenge, the fallen Apostle aims to spite Christ by causing the world to be overrun by vampires. Dracula's immortality is a choice; he refuses to seek the redemption required to end his eternal life. After Simon kills Valerie, he is subdued by Solina and Lucy and brought to Dracula, who offers his blood to Mary. Mary feigns biting Simon, then turns on the brides and stabs Dracula, proving her free will remains intact.

Matched in strength, Mary loops a crucifix cable around Dracula's neck and drags him off the roof. As the sun consumes him, Dracula looks to the crucifix as Judas, freeing Mary from her curse before finally perishing.

Returning to the United Kingdom to claim the Van Helsing estate, Mary assumes watch over Dracula's remains with Simon steadfastly at her side. Despite being able to stand in the sunlight without burning pain, Mary's eyes briefly flicker with an eerie glow, suggesting she has not fully returned to normal.

== Cast ==
- Jonny Lee Miller as Simon Sheppard
- Justine Waddell as Mary Heller / Mary Van Helsing
- Gerard Butler as Judas Iscariot / Dracula
- Jennifer Esposito as Solina Portersmith
- Christopher Plummer as Abraham Van Helsing
- Colleen Ann Fitzpatrick as Lucy Westerman
- Danny Masterson as Nightshade
- Jeri Ryan as Valerie Sharpe
- Lochlyn Munro as Eddie
- Sean Patrick Thomas as Trick
- Omar Epps as Marcus
- Tony Munch as Charlie
- Shane West as J.T.
- Tom Kane as Anchor Man
- Nathan Fillion as Father David
- David J. Francis as Jesus Christ

== Production ==
=== Development ===
While finalizing post-production on Scream 3, Bob Weinstein approached editor Patrick Lussier on a modernized take on Dracula entitled Dracula 2000. When Lussier asked Weinstein what the film was about, Weinstein responded "I don't know." Joel Soisson, having written under Lussier for The Prophecy 3: The Ascent, was brought on board to flesh out the film. The filmmakers quickly drafted a screenplay by January 2000, which envisioned a smaller scale story than Weinstein had hoped for. Soisson's initial pitch, which included a vampire hunting priest, would ultimately be recycled for the sequel, Dracula II: Ascension. Inspired by the prior Hammer Horror entries, particularly Dracula A.D. 1972, Lussier attempted to employ similar methods for his film. Lussier and Soisson also sought to differentiate their Dracula from other adaptations. The director took note of the character's scorn for Christian iconography, ultimately linking him to Judas Iscariot.

Wes Craven served as an executive producer on the project. Craven's name was used heavily in marketing, as done on previous films such as Wishmaster and Don't Look Down. Ehren Kruger performed a script polish, while Scott Derrickson and his writing partner Paul Harris Boardman were enlisted for a rewrite just two weeks before production. According to Derrickson, Weinstein thought the script was "terrible" but was moving forward with production regardless; when Derrickson asked why he was making the movie, Weinstein replied "Because it's called Dracula 2000".

=== Casting ===
During pre-production in Toronto, Lussier had already blocked several scenes using assistants. Christopher Plummer, Jennifer Esposito, Colleen Fitzpatrick, Omar Epps, Justine Waddell, Jonny Lee Miller, and Jeri Ryan arrived on set, but no actor had been cast in the title role. Gerard Butler would be cast as Dracula only two days before filming commenced.

=== Filming ===
Filming took place in New Orleans and Toronto, beginning on June 26, 2000, and wrapping on September 6. A rough cut of the film was assembled in only six days. Additional photography occurred on October 23 and spanned eight days. Nathan Fillion was added during the reshoots, filming his brief scenes on Halloween night. In November, the Writers Guild of America ruled that Soisson would receive sole screenplay credit and share story credit with Lussier. The final cut of the film was expected to be delivered on December 12, 2000, a mere ten days before its theatrical release. Speaking to Entertainment Weekly, Craven compared Dracula 2000's rushed production to his time working on Scream 2, which was released in December 1997 after being filmed between June and August of that year. Craven said "What's the benefit of making movies so fast? There's no benefit whatsoever. It's terribly difficult, and completely unnecessary."

== Release ==
Dracula 2000 premiered in the United States on December 22, 2000.

=== Home media ===
Dracula 2000 was first released on home video in the United States by Dimension Home Video on July 17, 2001. The DVD edition included a variety of special features, such as deleted and extended scenes, a behind-the-scenes featurette, and auditions, including those featuring Gerard Butler. The release also offered an audio commentary with director Patrick Lussier and screenwriter Joel Soisson. The DVD was presented in a 2.35:1 widescreen aspect ratio with English and French 5.1 Dolby Digital audio options. A VHS release accompanied the DVD, also distributed by Dimension Home Video on July 17, 2001. The VHS version included the film in its theatrical aspect ratio.

Dimension Films was sold by The Walt Disney Company in 2005, with its parent label Miramax then being sold by Disney in 2010. That same year, private equity firm Filmyard Holdings took control of Miramax and the pre-October 2005 library of Dimension. Filmyard sublicensed the home media rights for several Dimension and Miramax films to Echo Bridge Entertainment. Echo Bridge released Dracula 2000 on Blu-ray on May 18, 2011. On September 11, 2012, Echo Bridge also released a double-feature Blu-ray set, pairing Dracula 2000 with its first direct-to-video sequel, Dracula II: Ascension.

In March 2016, Filmyard Holdings sold Miramax and the pre-October 2005 Dimension library to Qatari company beIN Media Group. Then in April 2020, ViacomCBS (now known as Paramount Skydance) bought a 49% stake in Miramax, which gave them the rights to the Miramax library and the pre-October 2005 Dimension library. Through this April 2020 deal, Paramount Pictures became the worldwide distributor of Dracula 2000 and its sequels Dracula II: Ascension (2003) and Dracula III: Legacy (2005). Dracula III: Legacy was released in July 2005, before the October 2005 cutoff for Paramount's rights to Dimension films.

Paramount Home Entertainment re-released the film on DVD on July 27, 2021, also re-releasing many other Dimension/Miramax titles around this time. The home video rights were later sublicensed from Paramount to Shout! Factory, who re-released the film on an individual Blu-ray on May 14, 2024. Paramount also made the film available on their subscription streaming service Paramount+, as well as on their free streaming service Pluto TV.

== Reception ==
=== Box office ===
On its opening weekend, Dracula 2000 released alongside Cast Away, The Family Man, The Gift, Miss Congeniality, O Brother, Where Art Thou?, and Thirteen Days. The studio hoped the film would counterprogram against the "season's romantic comedies and dramas".

The film opened at #7 in its first week at the box office with $8,636,567. In its second week, the film had a 56.5% drop-off, but hung onto the #8 spot. The film grossed $33,022,767 domestically and $14,030,858 overseas for a worldwide total of $47,053,625, failing to make back its $54 million budget. Dracula 2000 was the sixth-highest-grossing film for Miramax/Dimension Films in 2000, exceeding the box office takes of such expensive Dimension Films releases like Reindeer Games, as well as Miramax's December opener for that year, All the Pretty Horses.

=== Critical response ===
The film received generally negative reviews from critics. Rotten Tomatoes reports a rating of 19% based on 70 reviews, with an average score of 3.59/10. The site's consensus states: "This retelling tries to offer a different spin on the origin of Dracula. Unfortunately, there's nothing here audiences haven't seen before". On Metacritic, the film has a 26 out of 100 rating, based on 14 critics, indicating "generally unfavorable" reviews.

Berge Garabedian of JoBlo offered a positive review, calling it "A fun vampire movie", "a novel adaptation of an old time legend", and "[good] for pretty much anyone looking for some enjoyable bloody fun". BeyondHollywood.com wrote: "Dracula 2000 is not the worst vampire movie I've seen, but it's definitely not the best either. There are some very good moments, most of them featuring the frail Van Helsing as he attempts to battle the fast and deadly vampires. Also, I appreciated the background given to Dracula's aversion to silver, crosses, and God, as well as Dracula's 'true' origins. Not bad work, but it could have been much better".

Owen Gleiberman of Entertainment Weekly gave the film a "C−" score, while James Berardinelli of ReelViews panned the film, writing: "Of all the indignities to have been visited upon Dracula during the past century (including being the "inspiration" for a cereal and a Sesame Street character, and being lampooned by Mel Brooks), none is more unsettling than what has happened to the world's most famous vampire in Dracula 2000". Jane Crowther of the BBC gave the film 1/5 stars, saying it was "Destined to enter the so-bad-it's-good hall of fame" and "a prime example of that old remake adage; if you can't do it better or different – don't do it at all."

=== Accolades ===
| Award/association | Year | Category | Result | Ref. |
|---|---|---|---|---|
| Saturn Awards | 2001 | Best Horror Film | Nominated | |
| Stinkers Bad Movie Awards | 2001 | Remake or Sequel Nobody Was Clamoring For | Nominated | |

== Soundtrack ==
The film's rock and metal soundtrack includes Powerman 5000's song "Ultra Mega", Linkin Park's song "One Step Closer", Pantera's song "Avoid the Light", System of a Down's cover of Berlin's "The Metro", Slayer's song "Bloodline" and Disturbed's song "A Welcome Burden". The original score composed by Marco Beltrami was released in 2017 by Varèse Sarabande as part of the label's Little Box Of Horrors limited edition 12-disc set. The score was released separately by the label in July 2020.

== See also ==
- Vampire film
