= Conspiracy? =

Television documentary series

Conspiracy? is a documentary television series that was created and originally aired on the History Channel that examines recent historical events from the perspective of conspiracy theory.

Premiering in 2004 and hosted by Tom Kane, notable episodes have examined the President John F. Kennedy assassination, the Senator Robert F. Kennedy assassination, the conspiracy theory that President Franklin Roosevelt had knowledge of the Japanese attack on Pearl Harbor before December 7, 1941, and theories about government agencies covering up UFO reports. It is one of the few conspiracy theory shows to not cover the 9/11 terrorist attack, while it is mentioned in a few episodes. The show is unique in that it also shows evidence that the subject conspiracy theory is not a conspiracy and isn't presented from a biased pro-conspiracy argument.

In 2009, the entire series was released in a box set DVD.

== Episodes ==
1. TWA Flight 800
2. Majestic Twelve: UFO Cover-Up
3. FDR and Pearl Harbor
4. Area 51
5. Who killed Martin Luther King, Jr.?
6. Princess Diana
7. Lincoln Assassination
8. Oklahoma City bombing
9. The CIA and the Nazis
10. Jack Ruby
11. RFK Assassination
12. Kecksburg UFO
