= Dracula III: Legacy =

2005 vampire film by Patrick Lussier

- DVD cover
- Directed by: Patrick Lussier
- Written by: Joel Soisson; Patrick Lussier
- Produced by: W.K. Border; Joel Soisson
- Starring: Jason Scott Lee; Jason London; Alexandra Wescourt; Diane Neal; Roy Scheider; Rutger Hauer
- Cinematography: Douglas Milsome
- Edited by: Lisa Romaniw
- Music by: Kevin Kliesch (Note: Original themes by Marco Beltrami.); Ceiri Torjussen
- Production companies: Castel Film Romania; Neo Art & Logic
- Distributed by: Dimension Films
- Release date: July 12, 2005
- Running time: 90 minutes
- Countries: United States; Romania
- Languages: English; Romanian; French

Dracula III: Legacy is a 2005 horror film and the sequel to Dracula 2000 and Dracula II: Ascension. The film was directed by Patrick Lussier and stars Jason Scott Lee, Jason London, Roy Scheider, and Diane Neal. It was released direct-to-video on July 12, 2005.

The role of Dracula is played by Rutger Hauer, following Gerard Butler in Dracula 2000 and Stephen Billington in Dracula II: Ascension, continuing the theme of Dracula's appearance changing due to "regeneration". Hauer had played vampires before, in Salem's Lot and in Buffy the Vampire Slayer, and he later portrayed Dracula's nemesis Abraham Van Helsing in Dario Argento's Dracula 3D (2012).

== Plot ==
Five years after the events of Dracula II: Ascension, Uffizi and Luke discover that Dracula has returned with Elizabeth to his castle in the Carpathian Mountains. But fearing that Uffizi has been tainted by Dracula, Cardinal Siqueros refuses to give Uffizi his blessing for the mission. Uffizi defrocks himself and sets out with Luke to Bucharest.

Romania has been devastated by a civil war, and NATO peacekeepers line the streets. In an abandoned village, Uffizi and Luke find a crashed helicopter containing a news reporter, Julia, and her cameraman Tommy. Tommy is turned by the vampire clowns terrorising the village, but all are destroyed by Uffizi and Luke. They leave Julia but are soon lured into a rebel trap. They find Julia with the rebels, refusing to return to England with nothing but a story on vampires.

The undead attack the rebel base during the night, but Uffizi, Luke and Julia survive, proceeding to Dracula's castle. There they find Elizabeth, almost totally turned to Dracula's way of life. Dracula mortally wounds Julia and tells Uffizi that only through God's forgiveness can he truly die, but Uffizi engages the ancient vampire in a duel and apparently destroys him by first biting him and draining him of his blood, then beheading him, announcing that he should consider himself forgiven. Meanwhile, Luke, on her request, beheads Elizabeth. Luke leaves the castle, while Uffizi sits on Dracula's throne, with Julia revived as a vampire. The film ends with the implication that Uffizi succeeds Dracula as the vampire king with Julia as his queen.

== Cast ==
- Jason Scott Lee as Uffizi
- Rutger Hauer as Judas Iscariot/Dracula
- Diane Neal as Elizabeth Blaine
- Jason London as Luke
- Roy Scheider as Cardinal Siqueros
- Alexandra Wescourt as Julia Hughes
- Claudiu Bleonț as Bogdan
- Serban Celea as Gabriel
- Ioana Ginghina as Bride of Dracula
- Ilinca Goia as Marta
- George Grigore as Bruno
- Ioan Ionescu as Ragman
- Tom Kane as EBC Anchorman

== Reception ==
Critical reaction to Dracula III: Legacy has been mixed, though more positive in general than that of Dracula II: Ascension. John Puccio of DVD Town said: "This one is no world beater and hardly scary, but at least it's got mood and tone and atmosphere to spare, something the first two movies in the ongoing series lacked entirely. ... Dracula III: Legacy contains some decent acting and some solid atmospherics". Kevin Carr of 7M Pictures said: "At least in the cinematic morass that is modern movies, Dracula III is better than the wimpy vampire lore pioneered by Anne Rice. ... Dracula III falls somewhere below Hellraiser but above the Crow sequels. It's not a grand placement, but there's always a market for vampire movies".

== Home media ==
This film was released on DVD and VHS on July 12, 2005.

Walter Chaw of Film Freak Central wrote: "The strength of Dracula III is in its use of locations, with Lussier finally figuring out how to work with a DP to create a foreboding atmosphere. ... If reports are true and this is Lussier's last dip in the Carpathian pool, at least he's ending somewhere just north of mediocre". Dread Central's review stated that "Lussier and company aren't out to reinvent the wheel, but they do one hell of a good job of keeping it turning. ... Each shot is brimming with authentic feeling vampire flavor, at times achieving an almost Hammer Film type ambiance. Truly inspired stuff".

== See also ==
- Vampire film
