= If I Didn't Care (film) =

- Directed by: Benjamin Cummings; Orson Cummings
- Written by: Benjamin Cummings; Orson Cummings
- Produced by: Benjamin Cummings; Orson Cummings
- Starring: Bill Sage; Susie Misner; Noelle Beck; Roy Scheider; Ronald Guttman
- Cinematography: Brian Pryzpek
- Edited by: Geoffrey Richman
- Music by: Michael Tremante
- Production company: Sweetooth
- Distributed by: Artistic License Films
- Release date: August 3, 2007 (New York City)
- Running time: 90 minutes 75 minutes
- Country: United States
- Languages: English; French

If I Didn't Care (aka Blue Blood) is a 2007 American mystery film written and directed by Benjamin Cummings and Orson Cummings and starring Bill Sage, Susie Misner, Noelle Beck, Roy Scheider and Ronald Guttman.

== Cast ==
- Bill Sage as Davis Myers
- Susan Misner as Hadley Templeton
- Roy Scheider as Linus
- Noelle Beck as Janice Myers
- Ronald Guttman as Ayad
- Brian McQuillan

== Reception ==
The film has a 37% rating on Rotten Tomatoes.
