= Tom Kane =

American voice actor (1962–2026)

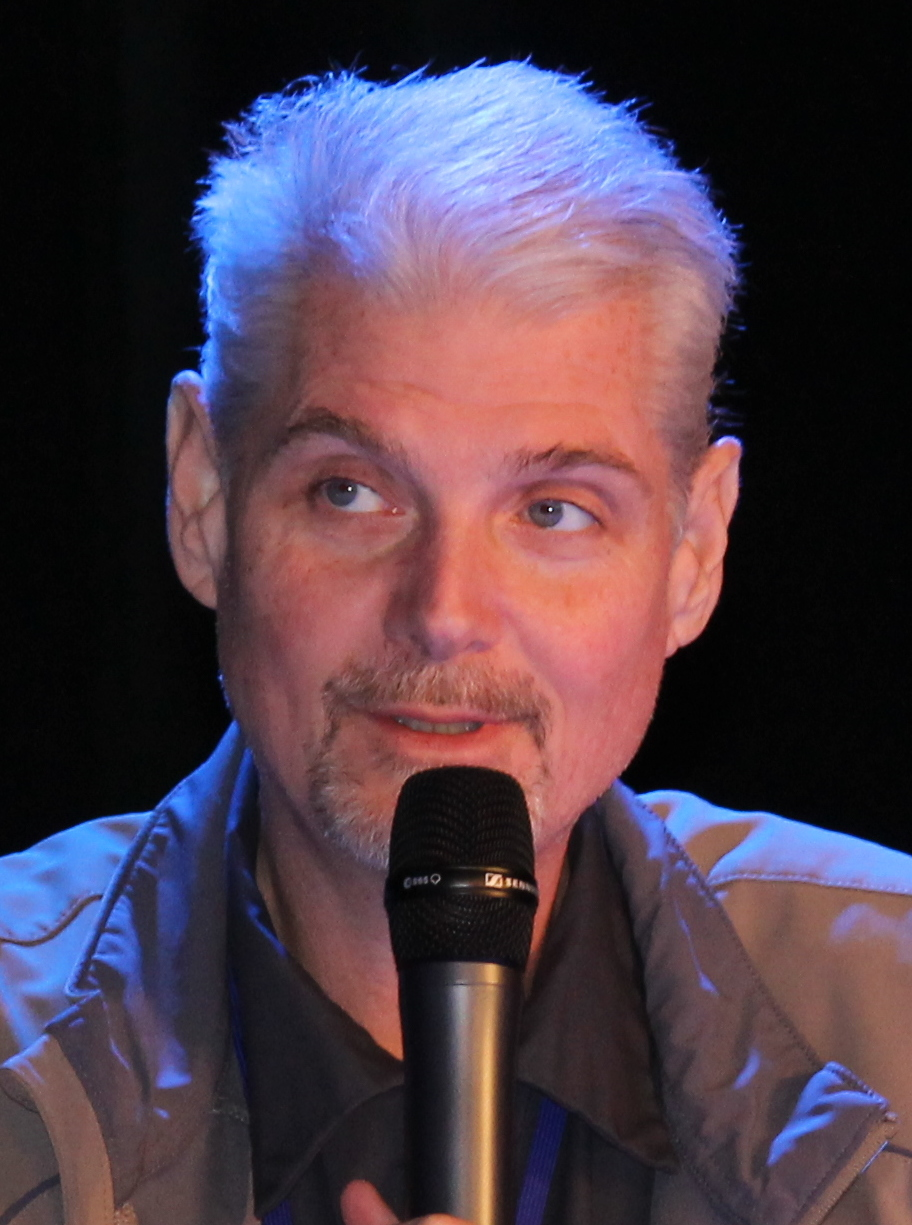
- Kane in 2015
- Born: Thomas Kane Roberts; April 15, 1962; Overland Park, Kansas, U.S.
- Died: May 18, 2026 (aged 64); Kansas City, Missouri, U.S.
- Education: University of Kansas
- Occupation: Voice actor
- Years active: 1977–2022
- Spouse: Cindy Roberts (m. 1982)
- Children: 9
- Website: tomkane.com

Thomas Kane Roberts (April 15, 1962 – May 18, 2026) was an American voice actor. He was known for his work in animation and video games, most notably the Star Wars franchise, voicing established characters Yoda, Admiral Ackbar, Boba Fett, Qui-Gon Jinn, and C-3PO. Other notable roles include Professor Utonium, Talking Dog, and HIM in The Powerpuff Girls, Chancellor Ferdinand from 9 (2009), Darwin Thornberry in The Wild Thornberrys, Mr. Herriman in Foster's Home for Imaginary Friends, and Woodhouse in Archer, taking the role over from George Coe following his death in 2015.

Kane provided his voice as an announcer for theme park attractions at Disneyland and Walt Disney World, and served as an announcer for several Academy Awards ceremonies, as well as for the Adult Swim series The Eric Andre Show in its second season.

== Early life ==
Thomas Kane Roberts was born in Overland Park, Kansas on April 15, 1962.

He attended Shawnee Mission South High School and graduated from the University of Kansas in 1984, where he began at Lucasfilm handling miscellaneous for small voice parts in video games.

== Career ==
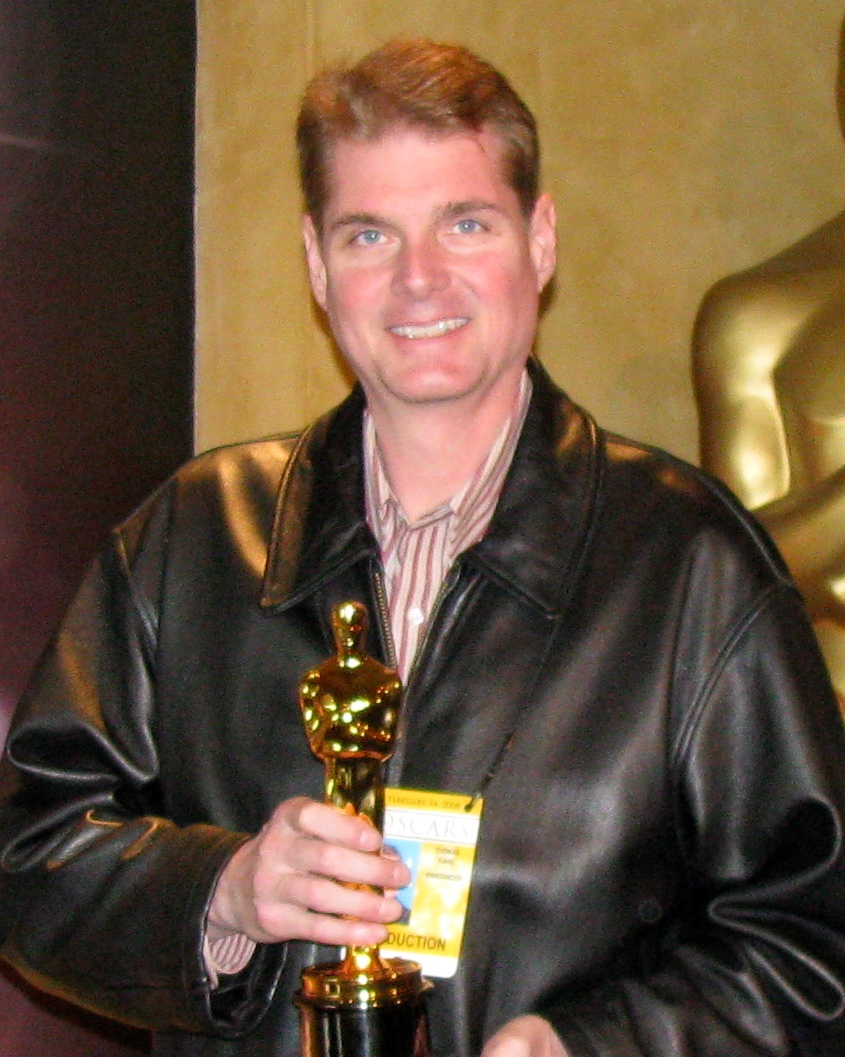
Kane in 2008

Kane began his voice acting career in 1977, when he was 15 years old. Some of his best-known roles include Jedi Master Yoda and Admiral Yularen in Star Wars: The Clone Wars feature film and television series, The Chancellor in 9, Magneto in Wolverine and the X-Men and Marvel vs. Capcom 3: Fate of Two Worlds, Ultron in Next Avengers: Heroes of Tomorrow and The Avengers: Earth's Mightiest Heroes, Mr. Herriman in Foster's Home for Imaginary Friends, Lord Monkey Fist in Kim Possible, Professor Utonium and HIM in The Powerpuff Girls, Oxnard Montalvo in The Angry Beavers, and Darwin Thornberry in The Wild Thornberrys.

He was also a prominent video game voice actor, appearing in numerous titles, from bit parts, to major roles such as Gandalf, Professor X and lead characters in many Star Wars games like Star Wars: The Force Unleashed as Imperial Captain Ozzik Sturn, Lobot and Kento Marek (the father of Sam Witwer's Galen Marek) thanks to Industrial Light & Magic's motion capture technology. In Call of Duty: World at War, Black Ops, Black Ops II, Black Ops III and Black Ops IV, he provided the voice of Takeo Masaki, a Japanese WWII soldier and WWI warrior in the Zombies game mode. In Fortnite: Save the World, Kane voiced the robot Lok.

In the arena of non-animation voiceover work, Kane recorded commercials, film trailers and television promos. In addition, he had been the announcer for the AFI Life Achievement Award show twice, as well as the 78th, 80th, 83rd, 84th, and 90th Academy Awards, and also did the voiceover for the Disney's FastPlay bumper in 2004. He also played Odin (the father of Thor and Loki) in the video game adaptation of Thor as well as the Disneyland attraction: Thor: Treasures of Asgard, replacing Anthony Hopkins, who played the character in the film.

On April 13, 2012, Kane replaced Joe Hursh as the voice of the Walt Disney World Monorail System. His voice was used until August 2026.

In 2013, he became the announcer of The Eric Andre Show, replacing Gary Anthony Williams.

Kane made his debut in the Star Wars film saga as the voice of Admiral Ackbar in 2017's Star Wars: The Last Jedi, succeeding Erik Bauersfeld. He had experience in voicing the character on several occasions for video games in the franchise prior to the film's release. He also voiced Plague Champion in Warhammer 40,000: Dawn of War II – Chaos Rising and Retribution.

During the COVID-19 pandemic, Kane was one of several voices for health and safety announcements at Walt Disney World. He also narrated the series premiere of Star Wars: The Bad Batch in May 2021.

== Personal life ==
Kane married his wife Cindy Roberts in 1982; they remained married until his death. The pair had three biological children, and adopted six others.

== Illness and death ==
In November 2020, Kane suffered a stroke which left him with significant weakness on the right side of his body and damage to his speaking, writing, and reading abilities. In September 2021, his daughter Sam confirmed that he had to retire from voice acting. She gave regular updates on Facebook about his condition.

Kane later died from complications of the stroke at a hospital in Kansas City, Missouri, on May 18, 2026, at the age of 64. His talent agency, Galactic Productions, announced the news on Facebook. Others such as The Powerpuff Girls and Foster's Home for Imaginary Friends creator Craig McCracken, and the titular cast members of The Powerpuff Girls of Cathy Cavadini, Tara Strong, and E. G. Daily paid their respects to him on their social medias, with the latter three reuniting with him at the Lexington Comic and Toy Convention in March 2026, his final public appearance prior to his death.

== Filmography ==
=== Voice acting ===
==== Film ====
Year	Title	Role	Notes
2001	Scooby-Doo and the Cyber Chase	Professor Kaufman	Direct-to-video
2002	The Powerpuff Girls Movie	Professor Utonium	
2002	The Wild Thornberrys Movie	Darwin Thornberry	
2003	Rugrats Go Wild	Darwin Thornberry	
2003	Dracula II: Ascension	Doctor	
2007	Shrek the Third	Guard #1	
2008	Star Wars: The Clone Wars	Yoda, narrator, Admiral Yularen	
2008	Next Avengers: Heroes of Tomorrow	Tony Stark / Iron Man, Ultron	Direct-to-video
2008	Foster's Home for Imaginary Friends: Destination Imagination	Mr. Herriman	Television film
2009	Hulk Versus	The Professor	
2009	District 9	News Reporter	
2009	9	The Chancellor	
2010	Angelo Della Morte	Azreal Collins	
2011	Star Tours – The Adventures Continue	Admiral Ackbar	Theme park attraction
2011	Hughes the Force	TK-5703	Theme park attraction
2011	The Smurfs	Narrator Smurf	
2012	Red Tails	Bomber Pilot	Uncredited
2012	Star Wars Droids: The Jawa Adventure	C-3PO	Short film
2012	Halloween Awakening: The Legacy of Michael Myers	Dr. Samuel Loomis	Short film
2012	Grand Deception	Narrator	Documentary
2013	The Smurfs 2	Narrator Smurf	
2013	The Smurfs: The Legend of Smurfy Hollow	Narrator Smurf	
2015	Star Wars: The Force Awakens	Additional voices	
2016	Rogue One	Additional voices	
2017	Star Wars: The Last Jedi	Admiral Ackbar	
2018	Solo: A Star Wars Story	Additional voices	
2019	Star Wars: The Rise of Skywalker	Additional voices	

==== Television ====
Year	Title	Role	Notes
1992	Who's the Boss?	Announcer	Episode: "Tony, Can You Spare a Dime?"
1992	The Legend of Prince Valiant	Additional voices	Episode: "The Curse"
1993	Great Wonders of the World	Narrator	Documentary
1995–1996	Iron Man	H.O.M.E.R., Century, Stingray, Ghost, Sunturion	8 episodes
1995–1996	The Twisted Tales of Felix the Cat	Additional voices	Unknown episodes
1996	Phantom 2040	Mr. Hand, Vagrant, GP Biot	Episode: "The Second Time Around"
1996	Wing Commander Academy	Additional voices	Episode: "On Both Your Houses"
1996–1997	The Incredible Hulk	Scimitar, H.O.M.E.R.	Episodes: ”The Lost Village” (Scimitar); ”Helping Hand, Iron Fist” (H.O.M.E.R.)
1997	Duckman	Gene Vuuck, Bill Clinton	
1997	Spider-Man: The Animated Series	Doctor Doom	Episode: "Secret Wars, Chapter 3: Doom"
1997–1998	The Angry Beavers	Oxnard Montalvo, Mayor, Jack Stagger, Male Hero, Archaeoligist, Hero	
1997–1998	Team Knight Rider	Dante	22 episodes
1997, 1999	Cow and Chicken	Announcer, Roman Soldier, Voice on TV, Super Hero #1	2 episodes
1997–2001	Johnny Bravo	Berry Vanderbolten, Pantene Claw, Golf Announcer, Tabby	8 episodes
1998–2004	The Wild Thornberrys	Darwin Thornberry, additional voices	Unknown episodes
1998–2005	The Powerpuff Girls	Professor Utonium, HIM, Talking Dog, Stanley Whitfield, additional voices	71 episodes
1998	I Am Weasel	Anchor Man, Master of Ceremonies, Conductor	Episode: "I Are Music Man"
1999–2007	Xyber 9: New Dawn	Captain Montand	3 episodes
2000	Buzz Lightyear of Star Command	Soldier, Tech	Episode: "Strange Invasion"
2000	Psyko Ferret	Narrator	Television film
2001	Cartoon Cartoon Fridays	Him	Episode: "Mojo Jojo Takes Over"
2001	The Wild Thornberrys: The Origin of Donnie	Darwin Thornberry	Television film
2001	Heavy Gear: The Animated Series	Greco	
2002	Totally Spies!	C.H.A.D., Helmut	
2002–2007	Kim Possible	Lord Monkey Fist, additional voices	11 episodes
2003	Codename: Kids Next Door	Simon	
2003	Kim Possible: A Sitch in Time	Monkey Fist, Real Estate Agent	Television film
2003–2005	Star Wars: Clone Wars	Yoda	9 episodes
2003–2005	Duck Dodgers	Walter Carbonite, President, Cooter, Nostrillian Captain	6 episodes
2004	CatDog	Evil Eric	
2004	Disney Fast Play	Announcer	
2004–2005	Conspiracy?	Host	11 episodes
2004–2005	The Grim Adventures of Billy & Mandy	Professor Utonium, Cap'n, Captain Heifer	2 episodes
2004–2009	Foster's Home for Imaginary Friends	Mr. Herriman, Sloppy Moe, additional voices	66 episodes
2005	Teen Titans	Bob	Episode: "Employee of the Month"
2005	Avatar: The Last Airbender	Additional voices	Episode: "Imprisoned"
2005	The Adventures of Jimmy Neutron: Boy Genius	Dean Cain	Episode: "Jimmy Goes to College"
2005	UFO Files	Narrator	2 episodes
2005–2006	The X's	Lorenzo, Old Guy, Alien	8 episodes
2006	Four Eyes!	Headmaster Payne	Episode: "Pilot"
2006	The Case for a Creator	Narrator	Documentary
2006	Inside Saddam's Reign of Terror	Narrator	Documentary
2006–2009	9/11 Commission Report	Narrator	16 episodes
2006–2011	Robot Chicken	Additional voices	5 episodes
2006	Ben 10	Ultimos, Arctiguana, Donovan Grandsmith	
2007	Robot Chicken: Star Wars	C-3PO	TV special
2008	Robot Chicken: Star Wars Episode II	Yoda	Uncredited; TV Special
2008	The Powerpuff Girls Rule!!!	Professor Utonium, Him, Talking Dog	Television film
2008	Back at the Barnyard	Freddy's Dad	Episode:"Meet the Ferrets"
2008–2009	Wolverine and the X-Men	Erik Lehnsherr / Magneto, Professor Thorton	13 episodes
2008–2014, 2020	Star Wars: The Clone Wars	Narrator, Yoda, Admiral Yularen	132 episodes
2009	Titan Maximum	Chip	Episode: "One Billion Dead Grandparents"
2010	The Boondocks	Dr. Doomis	Episode: "Smokin' with Cigarettes"
2010	Robot Chicken: Star Wars Episode III	Yoda, TV Announcer	TV special
2011	Lego Star Wars: The Padawan Menace	Yoda, narrator, Senator Yaun, Admiral Ackbar	Television short
2011–2012	The Avengers: Earth's Mightiest Heroes	Ultron, Jasper Sitwell, Professor Thorton	6 episodes
2011–2012	Mad	Morgan Freeman, HIM, Announcer, Narrator	4 episodes
2011–2015	Archer	Woodhouse, Hans Hessler	16 episodes
2012	Lego Star Wars: The Empire Strikes Out	Narrator, Yoda	Television short
2013	The Smurfs: The Legend of Smurfy Hollow	Narrator Smurf	Television short
2013	The Legend of Korra	Judge Hotah	Episode: "Civil Wars: Part 2"
2013	Lady Gaga and the Muppets Holiday Spectacular	Announcer	Television special
2013–2014	Lego Star Wars: The Yoda Chronicles	Yoda, narrator, Red Guard Pilot	7 episodes
2014	The Powerpuff Girls: Dance Pantsed	Professor Utonium, additional voices	Television film
2014	Saber	Announcer	Episode: "Return of the Threesome"
2015	Lego Star Wars: Droid Tales	Narrator, Yoda, Ghost, Qui-Gon Jinn	5 episodes
2016	The Grindhouse Radio	Himself	Episode: "GHR: Erin J. Cahill/Tom Kane"
2016–2019	The Powerpuff Girls	Professor Utonium, Him, additional voices	61 episodes
2017	Star Wars Rebels	Colonel Yularen, Stormtrooper #3	Episode: "Through Imperial Eyes"
2017–2018	Star Wars Forces of Destiny	Yoda	3 episodes
2018	Fortnite: Aquavita Live Stream	Lok	Episode: "Season 4 RELEASE!"
2020	Sarah Cooper: Everything's Fine	Narrator	TV special
2020	The Lego Star Wars Holiday Special	Qui-Gon Jinn, Yoda	Television film
2021	Star Wars: The Bad Batch	Narrator	Episode: "Aftermath"
2021	Cake	Trobotto	Episode: "Dinner Party"

==== Video games ====
Year	Title	Role	Notes	Source
1994	Might and Magic: World of Xeen	Additional voices	Credited as Tom Keane	
1995	The Dark Eye	Narrator		
1995	Shannara	Allanon, Seneschal, Brona, Davio, Bremen		
1996	Star Wars: Shadows of the Empire	Leebo	PC version	
1996	Star Wars: X-Wing vs. TIE Fighter	Imperial Officer #1, Rebel Pilot #4	Credited as Tom Kayne	
1997	The Curse of Monkey Island	Captain Rottingham, The Flying Welshman		
1997	Pitfall 3-D: Beyond the Jungle	Arcam, Scourge		
1997	Interstate '76	Skeeter		
1998	Star Wars: Rebellion	Additional voices		
1998	Grim Fandango	Raoul, 2nd Mayan Mechanic, Gate Keeper, Cat Track Announcer		
1998	Return to Krondor	Additional voices		
1998	Star Wars: Droid Works	C-3PO, British Droid, Male Pedestrian		
1998	Interstate '76 Nitro Pack	Skeeter, Natty Dread		
1998	Interstate '76 Arsenal	Skeeter		
1999	Star Wars: Episode I – The Phantom Menace	C-3PO, Barbo, Jym Lang		
1999	Gabriel Knight 3: Blood of the Sacred, Blood of the Damned	Mallory, Jesus		
1999	Star Wars: X-Wing Alliance	Commander Beckman, Golov Nakhym, Imperial Officer		
1999	Star Wars: Yoda's Challenge Activity Center	Yoda, Announcer		
2000	Star Wars Episode I: Jedi Power Battles	Yoda, Commander Droid, Gungan Guard #2		
2000	Star Wars Episode I: Racer	Elan Mak, Slide Paramita		
2000	Escape from Monkey Island	Bagel the LUA Bar Patron, Pegnose Pete		
2000	Star Wars: Demolition	Boba Fett, Bib Fortuna, General Otto		
2000	Ground Control: Dark Conspiracy	Cardinal Galen Yi, Units #13		
2000	The Wild Thornberrys: Rambler	Darwin Thornberry		
2000	Star Wars: Force Commander	AT-AT Driver, ATC-Airfield, ATC-Star Destroyer		
2000	Nicktoons Racing	Darwin Thornberry	Archival recording	
2001	Star Wars: Starfighter	Mercenary Pilot, Wingman		
2001	Star Wars: Super Bombad Racing	Yoda, Chancellor Valorum, Battle Droid		
2001	The Powerpuff Girls: Mojo's Pet Project	Professor Utonium		
2001	Star Wars: Galactic Battlegrounds	Boba Fett, C-3PO, Empire Missile Destroyer Captain, Imperial Air Cruiser	Also Clone Campaigns	
2001	Star Wars Rogue Squadron II: Rogue Leader	Crix Madine, Imperial Pilot #2, Transport Captain #3		
2001	The Powerpuff Girls: Chemical X-Traction	Professor Utonium, Him		
2002	Star Wars: Racer Revenge	Dax Gazaway, Shrivel Braittrand		
2002	Star Wars: Jedi Starfighter	Yoda, Captain Juno		
2002	Star Wars Jedi Knight II: Jedi Outcast	Reborn 2, Rodian #1, Shadow Trooper		
2002	Star Wars: The Clone Wars	Yoda		
2002	The Powerpuff Girls: Gameville	Professor Utonium, Him		
2002	Star Wars: Bounty Hunter	M.C. Droid, Male Civilian #2, Longo Two-Guns		
2002	The Lord of the Rings: The Fellowship of the Ring	Gandalf, additional voices		
2002	The Powerpuff Girls: Relish Rampage	Professor Utonium, Male Citizen #3, Monkey Man #2		
2002	The Wild Thornberrys Movie	Darwin Thornberry, Guard		
2003	Rugrats Go Wild	Darwin Thornberry		
2003	RTX Red Rock	M.E.L., Panel Voice		
2003	Star Trek: Elite Force II	Additional voices		
2003	Star Wars: Knights of the Old Republic	Vander Tokare, Additional voices		
2003	Star Wars Jedi Knight: Jedi Academy	Boba Fett, Cultist #3, Stormtrooper #1		
2003	Star Wars Rogue Squadron III: Rebel Strike	C-3PO, Crix Madine, Imperial Pilot #2		
2003	The Hobbit	Narrator, Voice talent		
2004	Star Wars: Battlefront	Admiral Ackbar, Yoda		
2004	X-Men Legends	Chuck Simms, additional voices		
2004	Star Wars: Knights of the Old Republic II - The Sith Lords	Vandar Tokare, Additional voices		
2005	Dear Santa	Santa Narration	Television film	
2005	Mercenaries: Playground of Destruction	Additional voices		
2005	Shadow of Rome	Narratore, Extras		
2005	Star Wars: Republic Commando	Yoda, Captain Talbot, Trandoshan Slaver #2		
2005	Star Wars: Episode III - Revenge of the Sith	Yoda, Cin Drallig, Neimoidian Guard		
2005	Star Wars: Battlefront II	Yoda, Imperial Officer #3		
2006	Star Wars: Empire at War	C-3PO, additional voices		
2006	Final Fantasy XII	Marquis Halim Ondore IV	English version	
2006	Lego Star Wars II: The Original Trilogy	Additional voices		
2006	Marvel: Ultimate Alliance	Professor Charles Xavier, Grey Gargoyle, Kurse		
2006	Kim Possible: What's the Switch?	Monkey Fist		
2006	Kim Possible: Revenge of Monkey Fist	Monkey Fist		
2006	Star Wars: Empire at War - Forces of Corruption	Additional voices		
2006	Cartoon Network Racing	Professor Utonium, Him		
2008	Lego Indiana Jones: The Original Adventures	Indiana Jones		
2008	Star Wars: The Force Unleashed	Captain Ozzik Sturn, Kento Marek, Lobot, Imperial Officer	Also Ultimate Sith Edition	
2008	Zen Pinball	Magneto, C-3PO, Yoda		
2008	Soulcalibur IV	Yoda	English version	
2008	Fracture	Additional voices		
2008	Star Wars: The Clone Wars – Lightsaber Duels	Yoda, narrator		
2009	Cartoon Network Universe: FusionFall	Professor Utonium, Him, Mr. Herriman		
2009	Wanted: Weapons of Fate	Sloan		
2009	Wolfenstein	Leonid Alexandrov		
2009	Call of Duty: World at War	Takeo Masaki, additional voices	Uncredited	
2009	Batman: Arkham Asylum	James "Jim" Gordon, Quincy Sharp, Louie Green, Amadeus Arkham		
2009	Fat Princess	Narrator		
2009	Star Wars: The Clone Wars - Republic Heroes	Narrator, C-3PO, Yoda		
2009	Marvel Super Hero Squad	Magneto		
2010	Resonance of Fate	Antourion	English version	
2010	Warhammer 40,000: Dawn of War II – Chaos Rising	Plague Champion		
2010	The Lord of the Rings: Aragorn's Quest	Gandalf, Gamling, Hama		
2010	Star Wars: The Force Unleashed II	Yoda, Rebel Pilot		
2010	Call of Duty: Black Ops	Takeo Masaki, Dr. Schuster		
2011	Marvel vs. Capcom 3: Fate of Two Worlds	Magneto		
2011	Warhammer 40,000: Dawn of War II - Retribution	Plague Champion		
2011	Lego Star Wars III: The Clone Wars	Yoda, C-3PO, additional voices		
2011	Thor: God of Thunder	Odin		
2011	Iron Brigade	Woodruff		
2011	Batman: Arkham City	Quincy Sharp		
2011	Dance Central 2	Dr. Tan		
2011	The Lord of the Rings: War in the North	Gandalf		
2011	Ultimate Marvel vs. Capcom 3	Magneto	English version	
2011	Star Wars: The Old Republic	M1-4X, additional voices		
2012	Kinect Star Wars	Yoda, C-3PO, Naturalist, Imperial Commander		
2012	The Secret World	Sarge, Newsreader		
2012	Guild Wars 2	Narrator		
2012	Dance Central 3	Dr. Tan		
2012	Lego The Lord of the Rings	Additional voices		
2012	PlayStation All-Stars Battle Royale	Narrator (Fat Princess), Vox Populi		
2012	Guardians of Middle-earth	Gandalf		
2012	Call of Duty: Black Ops II	Takeo Masaki	Apocalypse DLC	
2013	The Magic of Oz the Great and Powerful: Second Screen	V.O. Narrator		
2013	Star Wars Pinball	Yoda, narrator		
2013	Marvel Heroes	Ultron	Uncredited	
2013	The Smurfs 2: Travel the World	Narrator Smurf		
2013	Batman: Arkham Origins	Quincy Sharp	Uncredited	
2015	Disney Infinity 3.0	Yoda, Admiral Ackbar		
2015	Lego Dimensions	Gandalf, Albus Dumbledore, Professor Utonium, HIM, Harry the Hunter, Langdon Shaw		
2015	Call of Duty: Black Ops III	Takeo Masaki		
2015	Star Wars: Battlefront	Admiral Ackbar		
2016	Lego Star Wars: The Force Awakens	Admiral Ackbar, Yoda, Mon Calamari Officer		
2017	Fortnite: Save the World	Lok		
2017	Star Wars: Battlefront II	Yoda, Admiral Ackbar		
2017	Liquid Metal	Dr. Podd		
2018	Lego DC Super-Villains	James "Jim" Gordon		
2018	Call of Duty: Black Ops 4	Takeo Masaki, Dr. Schuster, Cornelius Pernell		
2019	Dance Central (2019 video game)	Dr. Tan		
2019	Marvel Ultimate Alliance 3: The Black Order	Magneto		
2020	Star Wars: Squadrons	Additional voices		
2020	Ghost of Tsushima	Additional actors		
2021	Marvel Future Revolution	Magneto		
2022	Lego Star Wars: The Skywalker Saga	Yoda, Qui-Gon Jinn, Admiral Ackbar		

=== Live-action ===
==== Film ====
Year	Title	Role	Notes
1995	Wish Me Luck	Slag	
1995	A Nation Adrift	Narrator	Documentary
1998	Halloween H20: 20 Years Later	Dr. Samuel Loomis	Voice
1999	Infinity's Child	Phleig Narrator	Short film
2000	The Prophecy 3: The Ascent	Angel	Voice
2000	Dracula 2000	Anchorman	
2005	Dracula III: Legacy	Anchorman	
2009	The Way It Went Down	Gerard	
2011	This Is Not a Movie	Voice	
2013	I Know That Voice	Himself	Documentary
2015	Just Another Tuesday	Narrator	Short film

==== Television ====
Year	Title	Role	Notes
2006	78th Academy Awards	Announcer	
2008	80th Academy Awards	Announcer	
2008	Frame 313: The JFK Assassination Theories	Narrator	Documentary
2009	The Old Man and the Seymour	Narrator	Short film
2009	The Star Wars Comic Con '09 Spectacular	Himself	Television special
2009	Important Things with Demetri Martin	Revenger Announcer	Episode: "Power"
2010	Big Time Rush	Narrator	Episode: "Big Time Christmas"
2011	83rd Academy Awards	Announcer	
2012	84th Academy Awards	Announcer	
2013	The Eric Andre Show	Announcer	

== Awards and nominations ==
Year	Title	Accolade	Results
2012	Star Wars: The Clone Wars	Behind the Voice Actors Award for Best Vocal Ensemble in a Television Series	Nominated
2012	Star Wars: The Clone Wars	Behind the Voice Actors Award for Best Male Vocal Performance in a Television Series in a Supporting Role	Nominated
2012	Marvel vs. Capcom 3: Fate of Two Worlds	Behind the Voice Actors Award for Best Ensemble in a Video Game	Nominated
2012	Star Wars: The Clone Wars	Behind the Voice Actors Award for Best New Vocal Interpretation of an Established Character	Nominated
2013	Star Wars: The Clone Wars	Behind the Voice Actors Award for Best Performance in a Narrating Role	Nominated
2013	Star Wars: The Clone Wars	Behind the Voice Actors Award for Best Vocal Ensemble in a Television Series - Action/Drama	Nominated
2015	Star Wars: The Clone Wars	Behind the Voice Actors Award for Best Male Vocal Performance in a Television Series in a Supporting Role - Action/Drama	Nominated
2015	Star Wars: The Clone Wars	Behind the Voice Actors Award for Best Vocal Ensemble in a Television Series - Action/Drama	Nominated
2016	Lego Dimensions	Behind the Voice Actors Award for Best Vocal Ensemble in a Video Game	Won
