= Goodbye Promise =

- Film poster
- Directed by: David Branin
- Produced by: David Branin, Gregor Collins, Karen Worden
- Starring: Gregor Collins, Sarah Prikryl, Brian Ronalds
- Cinematography: AJ Rickert-Epstein
- Edited by: Aric Lewis
- Music by: CJ Wallis
- Distributed by: Indiegogo, Film Courage
- Release date: June 1, 2012
- Running time: 90 minutes
- Country: United States
- Language: English
- Budget: $16,203

Goodbye Promise is a 2012 mumblecore feature film, directed and co-written by Film Courage co-creator David Branin, and stars Gregor Collins, who co-wrote it with Branin. The film follows Collins as he says goodbye to his friends before he quits the entertainment business.

On August 13, 2012, using the platform Indiegogo, it became the first movie ever to be distributed online directly to its audience using a crowdfunding platform.

== Plot ==
When Matt moved to Hollywood he made a pact with himself that if he wasn't a working actor in exactly seven years he'd quit the business and move back to Washington, D.C. As the film opens Matt finds himself seven days shy of his self-prescribed deadline, and he's just as anonymous as the day he arrived into town. After an afternoon of soul searching in the mountains he decides to honor his deadline, and plans to spend his final week in Hollywood visiting friends to tell them he's leaving for good and that he'll have a going away party to cap it all off. With a couple days left before his going away party and tension mounting, Matt visits his eclectic mix of friends and people who have affected him over the years. Despite intending to tell them he's quitting the business, he chickens out, not quite being able to bring himself to tell them. On the night of the going away party he starts to think he's been stood up by everyone he thought he cared about and thought cared about him. But finally Dylan shows, then Robert, Amanda, JR - even Mylo, which means a great deal to Matt - and before long all the people he's visited over the past week are at the party. Amid drinks and music each friend stands up and gives their "goodbye Matt" speeches, making it clear that even though Matt's leaving he'll never be forgotten; he may be giving up on his dreams but he's been a good friend and helped a lot of people. In the middle of Matt's going away speech Sara pops in, looking beautiful, and Matt becomes so shocked and tongue-tied that he has to cut his speech short and take Sara out back alone. It is here that Matt asks her bluntly: "If I stay in Hollywood would you be with me?" She shakes her head. This is the final straw. There's officially nothing keeping him in Los Angeles. Matt is emasculated, and now more inspired than ever to leave Los Angeles in his rear view mirror. He heads back into the party to say his final goodbyes.

During the goodbyes Matt notices he has a phone message. He excuses himself and checks it in a quiet back room. The message is from his agent, who has gotten him a big audition for a new Jerry Bruckheimer pilot. But they want Matt on the same day he's set to drive back to DC. He's made up his mind, though. He's leaving for good. He finishes his goodbyes, goes home and packs his car for an early morning exit.

In the wee hours of the morning Matt gases up at a gas station and drives to a red light right before the freeway. He waits for the traffic light to turn green, and when it does, he just sits there, idling. The cars behind him honk and screech around him, but Matt refuses to budge at that green light. After a minute or so the light is still green, and he's still there, stone-faced. A satisfied smirk forms on his lips. Cut to black.

== Cast ==
- Gregor Collins as Matt
- Sarah Prikryl as Sara
- Brian Ronalds as Milton
- Todd Cattell as Scott
- Karen Worden as Amanda
- Brian Durkin as Dylan O'Malley
- Len Cordova as Robert
- Christopher Gukenberger as J.R.
- Tyshawn Bryant as Mylo Battle
- Frantz Durand as Phillipe
- Jud Bogard as Pete
- Dean Matthew Ronalds as Bradley
- Johnny Giordano as Vincent
- Kevin Deen as Gonzalez
- Jordan White as Jordan
- Raphael Dorval as Tony
- Rebekah Bell as Bekah

== Production ==
In April 2009 the film was among the first crop of indie features that flocked to crowdfunding - a relatively new concept at the time - to fund their film. Branin and Collins shot the film for about $500, and to complete post-production raised $16,203 on Kickstarter, which had launched just a few months earlier.

The crew consisted of Branin, the actor or actors in the scene, and one camera operator. There was no production sound mixer, consequently 95% of the film had to undergo automated dialogue replacement (ADR) during the editing process. Increasing costs and mounting post-production setbacks caused Branin and Collins to shelve the film for months.

The film was shot during the Summer of 2009, and because of actor's scheduling conflicts filmed only on weekends, from June until August. A portion of the film was shot during the 2009 California wildfires. During the shooting of the final sequence the fires were as close as a thousand yards away from the house at which they were filming in Sunland, California. The production crew was encouraged by neighbors and local authorities to evacuate. Branin and Collins decided to rush to incorporate the fires into the plot of the film in order to finish shooting before they had to cut camera and evacuate.

There was no script, the filmmakers and actors worked off a one-page outline of the general plot created by Branin and Collins. All dialogue in the film was 100% improvised. The journey of the main character of Matt (Collins) was an amalgamation of Branin and Collins' real-life struggles to break out of "indie" Hollywood. There were no auditions. Casting consisted of Branin and Collins hand-selecting friends, basing each character in the film on the actual person who was playing them.

== Release ==
Goodbye Promise premiered on June 1, 2012, at The Downtown Independent in Los Angeles. It became the first movie ever to be distributed online directly to its audience via a crowdfunding platform. Goodbye Promise was made available for free on YouTube on February 1, 2013.

== Reception ==
Gary W. Goldstein of the Los Angeles Times called Goodbye Promise a "richly emotional look at a failed actor's introspective last days in Hollywood."

Frequent Francis Ford Coppola collaborator Fred Roos: "On a micro budget David Branin and Gregor Collins created a perceptive and touching portrait of the lives of struggling actors working on the fringes of Hollywood."

Mark Bell of Film Threat: "A collection of thematically-connected scenes layered on top of one another, Goodbye Promise employs a unique narrative structure."

Television Producer Elizabeth Yoffe called it "A story that is completely accurate both in its harsh quality and sense of continual possibility."
