= The Shark Is Still Working =

The Shark is Still Working
- DVD cover
- Directed by: Erik Hollander
- Written by: James Gelet
- Produced by: James Gelet; Jake Gove; Erik Hollander; Michael Roddy; Michael McCormack
- Narrated by: Roy Scheider
- Cinematography: Erik Hollander
- Edited by: James Gelet; Erik Hollander
- Music by: Michael McCormack
- Distributed by: Universal Studios
- Release date: August 14, 2012
- Running time: 103 minutes
- Country: United States
- Language: English

The Shark is Still Working is an American documentary film on the impact and legacy of the 1975 Steven Spielberg blockbuster film Jaws. It features interviews with a range of cast and crew from the film. It is narrated by Roy Scheider and dedicated to Peter Benchley.

The documentary was produced by Jaws fans over a seven-year period, building on Laurent Bouzereau's 1995 documentary, The Making of Jaws, that has been included on some laserdisc and DVD releases. Throughout other documentaries over the years, such as Bouzereau's and the BBC's 1997 documentary In the Teeth of Jaws, actor Richard Dreyfuss has recounted tales about the troubled production of Jaws and the quote “The shark is NOT working” which Dreyfuss would hear constantly from members of the crew. Eventually, upon successful attempts to fix the malfunctioning sea monster, Dreyfuss would regularly hear the quote “The shark is working."

Universal Studios announced that The Shark Is Still Working documentary would be included as a special feature on the Blu-ray edition of Jaws.

Some of the interviews were filmed in 4:3 Academy ratio, typical of TV documentaries of the time. As the production went on, 16:9 became the TV shape standard and so the documentary crops the top and bottom of the image to reshape it to 16:9. There is no anamorphic enhancement of the documentary on the Jaws Blu-Ray.

== Crew ==
The Shark Is Still Working was created by producers James Gelet, Jake Gove, Erik Hollander, and James-Michael Roddy, co-producer and composer Michael McCormack, and associate producer Roy Scheider.

== Participants ==
The documentary features rare footage and exclusive interviews with most of the cast and crew of Jaws, as well as celebrities whose careers have been influenced by the film. It was written by James Gelet, directed by Erik Hollander and narrated by Academy Award nominee Roy Scheider, who played Chief Brody. Among the more notable of those interviewed are Steven Spielberg, Roy Scheider, Richard Dreyfuss, John Williams, Peter Benchley (in what would be his final on-camera interview), Carl Gottlieb, Joe Alves, Richard Zanuck, David Brown, Susan Backlinie, Jeffrey Kramer, Ron and Valerie Taylor, Dick Warlock, Kevin Smith, Robert Rodriguez, Bryan Singer, Greg Nicotero, Tom Savini, Eli Roth, M. Night Shyamalan, Percy Rodriguez (in what would be his final public appearance), and Paul McPhee.

== Premiere ==
The Shark is Still Working made its world premiere May 2, 2009 at the Los Angeles United Film Festival.

== Reception ==
On review aggregator website Rotten Tomatoes, the film holds an approval rating of 100% based on 11 reviews, with an average rating of 8.7/10.

== 2012 soundtrack album ==
A limited edition 38 track companion CD soundtrack by composer Michael McCormack was released online and at Jawsfest, August 9, 2012.

=== Track listing ===
1. The Shark Is Still Working Theme
2. On-Set Setbacks
3. Lights, Camera, Hold On
4. Robot Shark
5. The Indianapolis Saga
6. Yellow Barrels
7. Martha's Song
8. The Shark Is Not Working
9. The Kid At the Table
10. Aquaphobia
11. Fans of the Fin
12. Orcas
13. Momentum
14. Ticket to Terror
15. A Time for Reflection
16. Lurking Beneath
17. The Year Was 1975!
18. Festival
19. You Always Make Me Smile
20. Call Me Ishmael
21. The Legacy
22. Bloody Tourist
23. Summer in Edgartown
24. A Whaaat...?
25. The Amity Suite
26. The Human Effect
27. Feeding Frenzy
28. Jaws Forever
29. Fate of the Sharks
30. Cage Attack
31. Great White
32. Deep Blue
33. Sandcastle
34. Mother Cutter
35. In Celebration of Our Heroes
36. Surviving the Challenge
37. Show Me the Way to Go Home
38. Spanish Ladies
