= Percy Rodriguez =

Canadian actor (1918–2007)

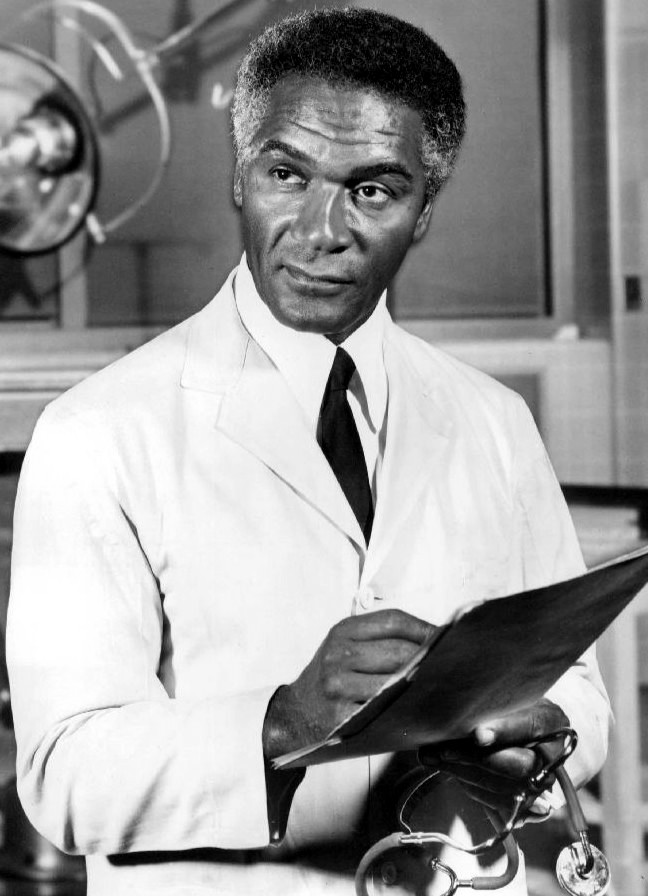
- Rodriguez as Dr. Harry Miles in Peyton Place (1968).
- Born: Percy Rodrigues; 13 June 1918; Montreal, Quebec, Canada
- Died: September 6, 2007 (aged 89); Indio, California, U.S.
- Occupations: Actor, voice actor
- Years active: 1948–1995
- Spouse: Almeada Batson (m. 1943; died 1996) Karen Cook (m. 2003)
- Children: 2

Percy Rodriguez (né Rodrigues; June 13, 1918 – September 6, 2007) was a Canadian actor and voice actor. Known for his rich and distinctive voice, he was one of the few black actors in the 1960s who were able to circumvent restrictive and negative stereotypes. He managed to avoid the stereotypical roles given to black actors at the time and was known for applying and projecting quiet authority and inner calm during his roles, as well as for the touch of grey in his hair.

Rodriguez was also known for his extensive voiceover work as the narrator of film trailers, television spots and documentaries.

== Early life ==
Of Afro-Portuguese hertiage, Rodriguez born and raised in the Saint-Henri neighbourhood of Montreal. He was the oldest of three siblings. After his father left home while Rodriguez was in his early teens, he began working to help provide for his family. He developed an interest in boxing and acting, becoming a professional boxer while simultaneously exploring acting jobs.

He ended up joining Montreal’s Negro Theatre Guild and ultimately won a Canadian Drama Festival acting award in 1939. Despite the award, finding a legitimate acting job was difficult, which led to him working as a toolmaker and machinist for 10 years at a Pratt & Whitney plant in Longueuil.

== Career ==
Rodriguez began his acting career in the 1930s, appearing in stage plays and television series in his native country. He eventually moved to New York City, where he made his Broadway theatre debut in Lillian Hellman's Toys in the Attic in 1960. Appearing next in The Actors Studio Theatre production of James Baldwin's Blues for Mister Charlie (and, shortly thereafter, in an abbreviated television adaptation on CBS), Rodriguez subsequently became a life member of the Studio. He adopted the spelling "Rodriguez" after it was misspelled in a Broadway program early in his career.

He went on to star on American television in programs such as The Nurses, Naked City, The Wild Wild West, Route 66 and Star Trek but first gained widespread notoriety in 1968 for his role as neurosurgeon Dr. Harry Miles in the prime time soap opera Peyton Place, seen as a breakthrough white-collar role for a black actor. He also appeared in the made-for-television films The Old Man Who Cried Wolf (1970), Ring of Passion (1978), Angel Dusted (1981), and the miniseries Roots: The Next Generations (1979). Through his depictions on television, Percy was seen as an excellent supporting character actor.

Rodriguez also had an extensive career on the stage and worked with several prominent African-American actors, such as Al Freeman Jr., Brock Peters, Moses Gunn, William Marshall, Raymond St. Jacques, Lincoln Kilpatrick, Rosetta LeNoire, Otis Young and Tony nominee Diana Sands. He also narrated numerous film trailers, TV spots and documentaries throughout his career, continuing to do voiceovers after retiring from acting in 1987, following his final on-camera role as a doctor in the TV movie Perry Mason: The Case of the Sinister Spirit.

=== Film trailers ===
Rodriguez was a prolific voice-over artist for film advertising. He is particularly famous for his eerie narration for trailers and TV spots for the film Jaws (1975), as well as the opening narration for Michael Jackson’s science fiction musical Captain EO (1986) for Disney theme parks. Rodriguez also provided narration for the Jaws sequels Jaws 2 (1978), Jaws 3-D (1983), and Jaws the Revenge (1987); his final appearance was in the documentary The Shark is Still Working, where he spoke of his narration of the trailer for the film Jaws; he also provided the narration for the documentary's trailer.

Rodriguez also narrated the very first teaser trailer for Alien (1979) and the trailer for the "Special Edition" release of the Star Wars Trilogy in 1997. Of the many film trailers and TV spots Rodriguez narrated over several decades, notable titles include The Other (1972), The Exorcist (1973), Shivers (1975), Taxi Driver (1976), Close Encounters of the Third Kind (1977), The China Syndrome (1979), Monty Python's Life of Brian (1979), The Amityville Horror (1979), The Blues Brothers (1980), For Your Eyes Only (1981), Videodrome (1983), Children of the Corn (1984), Brazil (1985), Ferris Bueller's Day Off (1986), Spaceballs (1987), Planes, Trains & Automobiles (1987), Coming to America (1988), A Fish Called Wanda (1988), Poltergeist III (1988), Friday the 13th Part VII: The New Blood (1988), Friday the 13th Part VIII: Jason Takes Manhattan (1989), Pet Sematary (1989), Bill & Ted's Excellent Adventure (1989), National Lampoon's Christmas Vacation (1989), Gremlins 2: The New Batch (1990), Jetsons: The Movie (1990), Misery (1990), Look Who's Talking Too (1990), The Addams Family (1991), Wayne's World (1992), Clerks (1994), The Nutty Professor (1996), and What Planet Are You From? (2000).

== Personal life ==
Rodriguez had a daughter, Hollis, and a son, Gerald, with his first wife, Alameda. Following Alameda's death, he married Karen Cook in 2003. On September 6, 2007, the actor died of kidney disease at his Indio, California home, aged 89.

== Legacy ==
Rodriguez played numerous roles, including detectives, lawyers, politicians, ambassadors, and doctors. According to Robert J. Thompson, "Television didn't have its equivalent of Jackie Robinson – there wasn't that one moment when the race barrier was broken. But Rodriguez was one of a very small group of actors who were in a relatively quiet way beginning to get these roles that television was very reluctant in the 1960s to give to black actors."

Rodriguez appeared in several Broadway productions in the 1960s and 1970s and helped to break racial barriers on television.

== Television work ==
- A Carol for Another Christmas (1964) as Charles
- The Man from U.N.C.L.E. episode "The My Friend the Gorilla Affair" (1966) as President Khufu
- The Wild Wild West (1966) episode "The Night of the Poisonous Posey" as Brutus
- Mission: Impossible four episodes (1966–1970)
- Star Trek episode "Court Martial" (1967) as Commodore Stone
- The Fugitive episode "Passage To Helena" Sheriff Dalton (1967)
- Mannix (1967) episode "A Catalogue of Sins" as Roy Bradley
- Chrysler Theatre (1967) episode "Deadlock"
- Peyton Place (1968–1969) as Dr. Harry Miles
- Adventures in Rainbow Country episode "The Boy Who Loved Animals" (1969)
- Then Came Bronson episode "Two Percent of Nothing" (1969)
- The Silent Force as Jason Hart (series regular, 15 episodes) (1970-1971)
- Somerset as The Lieutenant (1971)
- Cannon (1972) episode "A Flight of Hawks"
- The Starlost episode "Circuit of Death" as Sakharov Richards (1973)
- Genesis II (1973) as Primus Kimbridge
- The Rookies (1973) in Season 1, Episode 16 - "Crossfire" as R C Taylor
- Planet of the Apes episode "The Tyrant" (1974) as Aboro
- Good Times episode "Florida's Rich Cousin" (1975) as Cousin Edgar
- The Lives of Jenny Dolan (1975) as Dr. Mallen
- Sanford and Son episode " The Olympics" (1975) as Lou Turner
- Arthur Hailey's the Moneychangers (1976) as Nolan Wainwright
- The Jeffersons episode "Louise's New Interest" (1977) as Dr. Bob Jessup
- What's Happening!! episode "Mama, The School Girl" (1977) as Tod Miller
- Roots: The Next Generations (1979) as Boyd Moffatt
- Sanford (1980) as Winston
- Benson (1982–1985) as Judge Harper
- T. J. Hooker episode "Lady In Blue" (1983) as Jason
- The Atlanta Child Murders (1985) as Maynard Jackson
- The Incredible Crash Dummies PSAS (1985-1999) as announcer
- Perry Mason: The Case of the Sinister Spirit (1987)

== Filmography ==
- Trouble-Maker (Trouble fête) (1964) as Le policier noir
- The Plainsman (1966) as Brother John
- The Sweet Ride (1968) as Lt. Harvey Atkins
- The Heart Is a Lonely Hunter (1968) as Dr. Benedict Copeland
- Bayou Boy (1971) as Charbot
- Come Back, Charleston Blue (1972) as Bryce
- The Legend of Hillbilly John (1972) as Capt. Lojoie H. Desplain IV
- Rhinoceros (1974) as Mr. Nicholson
- Hugo the Hippo (1975) as Jorma's father (voice)
- The Astral Factor (1978) as Captain Wells
- Galaxina (1980) as Ordric (voice)
- Heavy Metal (1981) as Loc-Nar (voice, uncredited)
- Deadly Blessing (1981) as Narrator (voice)
- BrainWaves (1982) as Dr. Robinson
- Captain EO (1986) as Narrator
- The Shark Is Still Working (2006) (documentary)
