= Roy Scheider =

American actor (1932–2008)

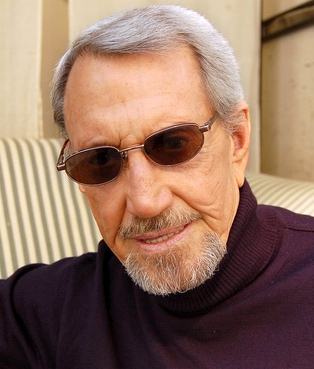
- Scheider in 2007
- Born: Roy Richard Scheider; November 10, 1932; Orange, New Jersey, U.S.
- Died: February 10, 2008 (aged 75); Little Rock, Arkansas, U.S.
- Other name: Roy R. Scheider
- Education: Rutgers University; Franklin & Marshall College
- Occupation: Actor
- Years active: 1952–2008
- Spouses: Cynthia Bebout (m. 1962; div. 1986); Brenda Siemer (m. 1989)
- Children: 3, including Christian (Note: Two biological children and one adopted child.)

Roy Richard Scheider (/ˈʃaɪdər/ SHY-dər; November 10, 1932 – February 10, 2008) was an American actor who achieved fame with his leading and supporting roles in celebrated films from the 1970s to the mid-1980s including the lead role in Jaws. He was nominated for two Academy Awards, one Golden Globe, and one BAFTA Award, and won both an Obie and Drama League Award for his stage performances.

Scheider's best-known film roles include Police Chief Martin Brody in Jaws (1975) and its 1978 sequel, "Cloudy" Russo in The French Connection (1971), Frank Ligourin in Klute (1971), "Buddy" in The Seven-Ups (1973), Doc Levy in Marathon Man (1976), Scanlon / Dominguez in Sorcerer (1977), Joe Gideon in All That Jazz (1979), and Frank Murphy in Blue Thunder (1983).

Subsequent credits included Naked Lunch (1991), Romeo Is Bleeding (1993), The Myth of Fingerprints (1997), The Rainmaker (1997), and The Punisher (2004). He also starred as Captain Nathan Bridger on the NBC television series seaQuest DSV (1993–96).

== Early life and education ==
Scheider was born in Orange, New Jersey, the son of Anna (née Crosson; 1906–1984) and auto mechanic Roy Bernhard Scheider (1903–1976). Scheider's mother was of Irish descent with an Irish Catholic background. His father was a Protestant German American. As a child, Scheider was an athlete, participating in organized baseball and boxing competitions, for which he was classed as a welterweight, weighing in at 140 lb (63.5 kg).

Scheider competed in the Diamond Gloves Boxing Tournament in Elizabeth, New Jersey. He attended Columbia High School in Maplewood, New Jersey, graduating in 1950, and was inducted into the school's hall of fame in 1985. He traded his boxing gloves for the stage, studying drama at both Rutgers University and Franklin & Marshall College, where he was a member of Phi Kappa Psi fraternity.

=== Military service ===
From 1955 to 1958, Scheider served in the United States Air Force as a first lieutenant in air operations. He then became a captain in the Air Force Reserve Command until 1964.

== Amateur boxing ==
Between 1946 and 1949, Scheider boxed as an amateur in New Jersey. Scheider said in a television interview in the 1980s that he took up boxing to lose weight. He said he had no desire to fight, but that his trainer, Georgie Ward, encouraged him to compete.

In his second bout, at the 1946 Diamond Gloves Tournament (Golden Gloves), Scheider suffered a broken nose and lost by technical knockout in two rounds to Myron Greenberg.

He went on to post an 11–1 (ten knockouts) record, reversing his defeat by Greenberg in the process.

Amateur boxing record: Roy Scheider (unverified)
Result	Opponent	Method	Date	Round	Time	Event	Location	Notes
Win	(United States) Earl Garrett	KO	March 17, 1949	1			Elizabeth, New Jersey	
Win	(United States) Ted LaScalza	KO	March 12, 1949	1			Jersey City, New Jersey	
Win	(United States) Peter Read	KO	February 17, 1949	1			Elizabeth, New Jersey	Scheider suffers nose injury; drops out of tournament.
Win	(United States) Nick Welling	KO	July 20, 1948	1			Elizabeth, New Jersey	
Win	(United States) Jerry Gould	KO	July 2, 1948	1			Orange, New Jersey	
Win	(United States) Alfonse D'Amore	KO	March 2, 1948	1			Orange, New Jersey	
Win	(United States) Peter Read	TKO	February 21, 1948	2			Elizabeth, New Jersey	
Win	(United States) Phillip Duncan	KO	February 19, 1948	1			Elizabeth, New Jersey	
Win	(United States) Stewart Murphy	KO	April 1, 1947	1	0:16	Golden Gloves	New Jersey	
Win	(United States) Myron Greenberg	KO	January 10, 1947	1		Golden Gloves	New Jersey	
Loss	(United States) Myron Greenberg	TKO	January 11, 1946	2		Golden Gloves	New Jersey	Scheider's nose was broken.
Win	(United States) Frank Brayden	KO	January 9, 1946	2		Golden Gloves	New Jersey	

== Acting career ==
In 1964, Scheider's first film role was in the horror film The Curse of the Living Corpse. On television, he played running roles on two CBS soap operas, Love of Life and The Secret Storm, and played character roles in episodes of Camera Three, N.Y.P.D., and Coronet Blue. He was in the TV movie Lamp at Midnight (1966). In 1968, Scheider appeared with the New York Shakespeare Festival, and won an Obie Award for Distinguished Performance in Hugh Leonard's play, which was adapted from the works of James Joyce, Stephen D, appearing in it 68 times at the East 74th Street Theater. He appeared in the films Stiletto (1969), Loving (1970), and Puzzle of a Downfall Child (1970), and on television in Where the Heart Is and Cannon.

In 1971, he appeared in two highly popular films, Klute, directed by Alan Pakula, and The French Connection, directed by William Friedkin. The latter, in which he played a fictionalized version of New York City detective Sonny Grosso, gained him an Oscar nomination for Best Supporting Actor. Scheider became much in demand. He went to Europe to have key supporting roles in The French Conspiracy (1972) and The Outside Man (1972).

In 1973, Scheider's first starring role came in The Seven-Ups, a quasi follow-up to The French Connection, in which Scheider's character is once again based on Grosso. He was second-billed in Sheila Levine Is Dead and Living in New York (1975).

Scheider portrayed Chief Martin Brody in the Hollywood blockbuster Jaws (1975), which also starred Robert Shaw and Richard Dreyfuss. Scheider's ad-libbed line, "You're gonna need a bigger boat," was voted 35th on the American Film Institute's list of best movie quotes. He appeared as secret agent Doc Levy in Marathon Man (1976), with Dustin Hoffman and Laurence Olivier.

Scheider was initially set to appear in the lead role in Michael Cimino's never-filmed romantic thriller Perfect Strangers, but the film was canceled due to "political machinations" at Paramount. Scheider was later offered the role portrayed by Robert De Niro in Cimino's The Deer Hunter (1978), which was the second film of a three-picture deal with Universal Studios. He reunited with French Connection director William Friedkin in Sorcerer (1977), the second adaptation of the 1950 French novel The Wages of Fear. Although the film didn't do well at the box office, it has since acquired a large cult following.

Still under contract after dropping out two weeks before The Deer Hunter started filming, Universal offered him the option of reprising his role as Martin Brody for a Jaws sequel, and would consider his contractual obligations fulfilled if he accepted. Scheider reluctantly accepted and Jaws 2 was released in 1978, where it also became a huge hit. He next starred in Last Embrace (1979), a thriller directed by Jonathan Demme. He received his second Academy Award nomination, this time as Best Actor in All That Jazz (1979), in which he played a fictionalized version of the film's director and co-writer Bob Fosse. Some of the film's production was portrayed in the FX miniseries Fosse/Verdon, in which Scheider was played by Lin Manuel-Miranda.

He made a thriller with Meryl Streep for Robert Benton, Still of the Night (1982), which was a box-office disappointment. The following year, however, his box office performance improved with Blue Thunder (1983), a John Badham film about a prototype attack helicopter that provided security over the city of Los Angeles during the 1984 Summer Olympic Games. He made two TV movies, Jacobo Timerman: Prisoner Without a Name, Cell Without a Number (1983) and Tiger Town (1984). This was followed by a role as Dr. Heywood Floyd in Peter Hyams' 2010, a 1984 sequel to Stanley Kubrick's 1968 science-fiction classic 2001: A Space Odyssey, in which William Sylvester originated the role of Floyd. He provided narration for Mishima: A Life in Four Chapters (1985).

Scheider was in The Men's Club (1986), 52 Pick-Up (1986) for John Frankenheimer, Cohen and Tate (1988), Listen to Me (1989), Night Game (1989), The Fourth War (1990) again for Frankenheimer, Somebody Has to Shoot the Picture (1990), and The Russia House (1990). One of his later parts was that of Dr. Benway in the long-in-production 1991 film adaptation of William S. Burroughs' novel Naked Lunch. Scheider played a mob boss who meets a horrific fate in the Gary Oldman crime film Romeo Is Bleeding (1994) and a chief executive of a corrupt insurance company cross-examined by Matt Damon's character in 1997's John Grisham's The Rainmaker, directed by Francis Ford Coppola.

Scheider appeared among an ensemble cast in The Myth of Fingerprints (1997), for which he was nominated for an Independent Spirit Award. He appeared as the crusty father of hero Frank Castle in The Punisher (2004), and in 2007, starred in The Poet and If I Didn't Care. When Scheider died in February 2008, he had two movies upcoming: Dark Honeymoon, which had been completed, and the thriller Iron Cross. In Iron Cross, Scheider plays the leading role of Joseph, a holocaust survivor with a propensity for justice, which was inspired by director Joshua Newton's late father Bruno Newton. Iron Cross was ultimately released in 2011.

Scheider was lead star in the Steven Spielberg-produced television series seaQuest DSV as Captain Nathan Bridger. During the second season, Scheider voiced disdain for the direction in which the series was heading. His comments were highly publicized, and the media criticized him for panning his own show. NBC made additional casting and writing changes in the third season, and Scheider decided to leave the show. His contract required that he make several guest appearances that season.

Scheider hosted an episode of Saturday Night Live in the 10th (1984–1985) season and appeared on the Family Guy episode "Bill & Peter's Bogus Journey", voicing himself as the host of a toilet-training video, portions of which were censored on FOX and syndicated broadcasts. He provided voiceover on the Family Guy episode "Three Kings", which was recorded in September 2007 and aired in May 2009, a year and three months after his death in February 2008, which also featured his Jaws co-star Richard Dreyfuss.

Scheider guest-starred in the Law & Order: Criminal Intent episode "Endgame" as serial killer Mark Ford Brady, who is identified at the episode's end as being the biological father of Detective Goren, played by Vincent D'Onofrio. He narrated and was associate producer of the 2006 Jaws documentary The Shark is Still Working. In 2007, Scheider received one of two annual Lifetime Achievement Awards at the SunDeis Film Festival in Waltham, Massachusetts. After Scheider's death, a biography entitled Roy Scheider: A Life was released as a tribute, compiling reviews, essays, and narration on his life and career.

== Personal life ==
Scheider married Cynthia Bebout on November 8, 1962. The couple had one daughter, Maximillia (1963–2006), before divorcing in 1986. On February 11, 1989, he married actress Brenda Siemer, with whom he had a son, Christian Scheider, and adopted a daughter. They remained married until his death.

== Death ==
In 2004, Scheider was diagnosed with multiple myeloma. In June 2005, he received a bone marrow transplant to treat the cancer. He died of a staphylococcal infection after a nearly three-year battle with the cancer on February 10, 2008, in Little Rock, Arkansas, at the University of Arkansas for Medical Sciences Medical Center. He was 75 years old.

== Filmography ==
=== Film ===
Year	Title	Role	Notes
1964	The Curse of the Living Corpse	Philip Sinclair	
1968	Paper Lion	Central Park Flag Football Player	Uncredited
1969	Stiletto	Bennett	
1970	Loving	Skip	
1970	Puzzle of a Downfall Child	Mark	
1971	Klute	Frank Ligourin	
1971	The French Connection	Det. Buddy 'Cloudy' Russo	
1972	The French Conspiracy	Michael Howard	aka The Assassination
1972	The Outside Man	Lenny	
1973	The Seven-Ups	Buddy, Seven-Up	
1975	Sheila Levine Is Dead and Living in New York	Sam Stoneman	
1975	Jaws	Police Chief Martin Brody	
1976	Marathon Man	Henry 'Doc' Levy	
1977	Sorcerer	Scanlon / Dominguez	
1978	Jaws 2	Police Chief Martin Brody	
1979	Last Embrace	Harry Hannan	
1979	All That Jazz	Joe Gideon	
1982	Still of the Night	Sam Rice	
1983	Blue Thunder	LAPD Officer Frank Murphy	
1984	2010	Dr. Heywood Floyd	
1985	Mishima: A Life in Four Chapters	Narrator (voice)	
1986	The Men's Club	Cavanaugh	
1986	52 Pick-Up	Harry Mitchell	
1987	Jaws: The Revenge	Police Chief Martin Brody	Archive footage; uncredited
1989	Cohen and Tate	Cohen	
1989	Listen to Me	Charlie Nichols	
1989	Night Game	Mike Seaver	
1990	The Fourth War	Colonel Jack Knowles	
1990	The Russia House	Russell	
1991	Naked Lunch	Dr. Benway	
1993	Romeo Is Bleeding	Don Falcone	
1997	The Myth of Fingerprints	Hal	
1997	Plato's Run	Senarkian	
1997	Executive Target	President Carlson	
1997	The Rage	John Taggart	
1997	The Peacekeeper	President Bob Baker	
1997	The Rainmaker	Wilfred Keeley	
1997	The Definite Maybe	Eddie Jacobsen	a.k.a. No Money Down
1998	Evasive Action	Enzo Marcelli	
1998	Better Living	Tom	
1998	The White Raven	Tom Heath	
2000	Chain of Command	President Jack Cahill	
2000	Falling Through	Earl	
2000	The Doorway	Professor Lamont	
2000	Daybreak	Stan Marshall	
2001	Time Lapse	Agent La Nova	
2002	The Good War	Colonel Gartner	a.k.a. Texas '46
2002	Angels Don't Sleep Here	Mayor Harry Porter	a.k.a. Blakflash 2
2003	Citizen Verdict	Governor 'Bull' Tyler	
2003	Dracula II: Ascension	Cardinal Siqueros	
2003	Red Serpent	Hassan	
2004	The Punisher	Frank Castle Sr.	
2005	Dracula III: Legacy	Cardinal Siqueros	
2005	Love Thy Neighbor	Fred	
2006	Last Chance	Cumberland	short film
2007	Chicago 10	Judge Julius Hoffman (voice)	Documentary
2007	The Poet	Rabbi	a.k.a. Hearts of War
2007	If I Didn't Care	Linus Boyer	a.k.a. Blue Blood
2007	The Shark Is Still Working	Narrator (voice)	Documentary
2008	Dark Honeymoon	Sam	direct-to-video
2009	Beautiful Blue Eyes	Joseph	Released posthumously; final acting role

=== Television ===
Year	Title	Role	Notes
1955	The United States Steel Hour	Dancer	Episode: "A Wind from the South"
1962	The Edge of Night	Kenny	
1964	Camera Three	Face	Episode: "The Alchemist"
1965–1966	Love of Life	Jonas Falk	Various episodes
1966	Lamp at Midnight	Francesco Barberini	Television movie
1967	The Secret Storm	Bob Hill #1	
1967	Coronet Blue	Apartment Manager	Episode: "A Charade for Murder"
1968	N.Y.P.D.	Paul Jason	Episode: "Cry Brute"
1969	This Town Will Never Be the Same	Performer	Television movie
1971	Cannon	Dan Bowen	Episode: "No Pockets in a Shroud"
1972	Assignment: Munich	Jake Webster	Television movie
1983	Prisoner Without a Name, Cell Without a Number	Jacobo Timerman	Television movie
1983	Tiger Town	Billy Young	Television movie
1985	Saturday Night Live	Host	Episode: "Roy Scheider"
1988	Portrait of the Soviet Union	Host	Miniseries
1990	Somebody Has to Shoot the Picture	Paul Marish	Television movie
1993	Wild Justice	Peter Stride	Television movie
1993–1995	seaQuest DSV	Captain Nathan Bridger	47 episodes
1998	Money Play$	Johnny Tobin	Television movie
1999	Silver Wolf	John Rockwell	Television movie
1999	The Seventh Scroll	Grant Schiller	Miniseries
1999	RKO 281	George J. Schaefer	HBO movie
2001	Diamond Hunters	Jacob Van der Byl	Television movie
2002	King of Texas	Henry Westover	Television movie
2002	Third Watch	Fyodor Chevchenko	6 episodes
2005	Carrier: Arsenal of the Sea	Narrator (voice)	TV documentary
2007	Law & Order: Criminal Intent	Mark Ford Brady	Episode: "Endgame"
2007–2009	Family Guy	Himself (voice)	2 episodes

== Partial stage credits ==
Year	Title	Role(s)	Venue	Notes	Ref.
1961	Romeo and Juliet	Mercutio	New York Shakespeare Festival		
1964	The Alchemist	Face	Gate Theatre, New York		
1964	The Chinese Prime Minister	Oliver, Tarver (understudy)	Royale Theatre, New York	Broadway debut	
1966	Serjeant Musgrave's Dance	Pvt. Hurst	Lucille Lortel Theatre, New York		
1965	Tartuffe	Sergeant, Clerk	ANTA Washington Square Theatre, New York		
1968	Stephen D		East 74th Street Theater, New York		
1969	Year Boston Won the Pennant	Marcus Sykowski	Vivian Beaumont Theater, New York		
1970	The Nuns		Cherry Lane Theatre, New York		
1980	Betrayal	Robert	Trafalgar Theatre, New York		
2003	Trumbo: Red White and Blacklisted	Dalton Trumbo	Westside Theatre, New York		

== Awards and nominations ==
Award	Year	Category	Work	Result	Ref.
Academy Award	1971	Best Supporting Actor	The French Connection	Nominated	
Academy Award	1979	Best Actor	All That Jazz	Nominated	
British Academy Film Award	1980	Best Actor	All That Jazz	Nominated	
Drama League Award	1980	Distinguished Performance	Betrayal	Won	
Golden Globe	1979	Best Actor – Film Musical of Comedy	All That Jazz	Nominated	
Independent Spirit Award	1997	Best Supporting Actor	The Myth of Fingerprints	Nominated	
National Society of Film Critics Award	1980	Best Actor	All That Jazz	Nominated	
Obie Award	1968	Distinguished Performance	Stephen D	Nominated	

== Bibliography ==
- Kachmar, Diane C. (January 1, 2002). Roy Scheider: A Film Biography. McFarland Publishing. p. 118. ISBN 9780786412013.
