= Hamutal Slovin =

Israeli neuroscientist and neurophysiologist

- חמוטל סלובין
- Born: March 19, 1967 (age 59); Kfar Saba, Israel
- Citizenship: Israeli
- Education: Bar-Ilan University
- Website: www.slovinlab.com

Hamutal Slovin (Hebrew: חמוטל סלובין; born 1967) is an Israeli neuroscientist and neurophysiologist who studies the visual system using optical imaging techniques. Slovin, is a professor at Bar-Ilan University, at the Gonda Multidisciplinary Brain Research Center. Her research focuses on deciphering the cortical mechanisms underlying visual and perceptual processing and their relation to eye movements, as well as reconstruction of visual stimuli from brain activity and artificial vision.

== Academic career ==
In 2004, she was appointed a lecturer at the Gonda Brain Multidisciplinary Center for Brain Research at Bar-Ilan University. In 2010, she was appointed a senior lecturer and in 2013, she was appointed an associate professor. Between 2014 and 2017, she served as the Head of the Neuroscience Program at Bar-Ilan University.

=== Research ===
Slovin's study focuses on the study of neural mechanisms in the visual cortex, which underlie the processing of visual information, visual perception and artificial vision. Slovin is investigating different types of eye movements and their effects on the processing of visual information in the brain.

In 2017, Slovin was placed 21st on Globes woman 50 influencers.

== Private life ==
Slovin is married and lives in Israel.

== Most-cited journal articles ==
Bergman H, Feingold A, Nini A, Raz A, Slovin H, Abeles M, Vaadia E. Physiological aspects of information processing in the basal ganglia of normal and parkinsonian primates. Trends in Neurosciences. 1998 Jan 1;21(1):32-8. (Cited 701 times, according to Google Scholar)

- Nini AS, Feingold AR, Slovin HA, Bergman HA. Neurons in the globus pallidus do not show correlated activity in the normal monkey, but phase-locked oscillations appear in the MPTP model of parkinsonism. Journal of Neurophysiology. 1995 Oct 1;74(4):1800-5. (Cited 686 times, according to Google Scholar.)
- Prut Y, Vaadia E, Bergman H, Haalman I, Slovin H, Abeles M. Spatiotemporal structure of cortical activity: properties and behavioral relevance. Journal of Neurophysiology. 1998 Jun 1;79(6):2857-74. (Cited 367 times, according to Google Scholar.)
- Shtoyerman E, Arieli A, Slovin H, Vanzetta I, Grinvald A. Long-term optical imaging and spectroscopy reveal mechanisms underlying the intrinsic signal and stability of cortical maps in V1 of behaving monkeys. Journal of Neuroscience. 2000 Nov 1;20(21):8111-21 ~(Cited 225 times, according to Google Scholar.)
- Slovin H, Arieli A, Hildesheim R, Grinvald A. Long-term voltage-sensitive dye imaging reveals cortical dynamics in behaving monkeys. Journal of Neurophysiology. 2002 Dec 1;88(6):3421-38. (Cited 221 times, according to Google Scholar.)
