= Christian Scheider =

American actor (born 1990)

- Scheider in 2018
- Born: 1990 (age 35–36); New York City, U.S.
- Occupations: Writer, filmmaker, actor, stage artist
- Father: Roy Scheider

Christian Scheider (born 1990) is an American writer, filmmaker, actor and stage artist.

== Early life ==
Scheider was born in New York City, the son of actor Roy Scheider and actress Brenda Siemer. Christian Scheider is a graduate of Bard College, where he received a B.A. in Philosophy and studied film and theater. He attended the Stella Adler Studio of Acting. He worked for three years as a peer and tutor in the Bard Prison Initiative, which offers B.A. and A.A. degrees to inmates serving terms in maximum security prisons. Also while at Bard, Scheider studied filmmaking and performed in many theatrical productions.

== Career ==
=== Film ===
Scheider heads video production for The Sunny Center in Ireland, a post-exoneration residential community. In 2020, Scheider produced films for The Bard Prison Initiative and Blue Meridian Partners.

His first documentary, A Dream Conferred about progressive education in Long Island, won the Youth Jury Award at the Hamptons International Film Festival in 2005. In 2012, Scheider co-produced and co-edited The Marfan Question, commissioned in partnership with the Johns Hopkins Medical Center for their interactive video resource program for people living with Marfan syndrome.

In 2015, Scheider co-produced and co-directed the documentary The Tree Prophet about self-identified climate prophet David Milarch, which had its premiere at the Santa Monica Film Festival in 2017 and won the Audience Award for Best Short Doc at the San Francisco Independent Film Festival.

In 2018, he produced and directed the documentary The Sunny Center, created to aid their growing national campaign for a refuge and rehabilitation center for people who have suffered wrongful incarceration and ignoble exoneration. Founded by Sonia 'Sunny' Jacobs and Peter Pringle in Ireland in 2003, The Sunny Center supports exonorees as they attempt to piece their lives back together and reintegrate into society. Scheider joined the board of The Sunny in 2019.

Scheider is writing and producing a limited series on George Pullman and 1894 American labor uprising known as the Pullman Strike.

=== Theater ===
Scheider has primarily written, produced and directed original adaptations of American literature for the stage. In 2013, with the endorsement from the estate, Scheider co-adapted Ray Bradbury's The Murderer with frequent collaborator Tucker Marder.

In 2014, Scheider and Marder were commissioned by the Parrish Art Museum to adapt Kurt Vonnegut's novel Galápagos with endorsement from the Vonnegut estate. The production featured a three-story set, a live orchestra, puppets, video and a twenty-six person cast including Oscar-nominee Bob Balaban.

In 2017, Scheider, Marder and Isla Hansen were commissioned by Guild Hall Center for the Visual and Performing arts to premiere their new original experimental performance The Summit, an original slapstick comedy about a not-so-fictional global elite preparing to abandon their bodies and upload themselves into the virtual beyond. “As wild and sci-fi as this sounds, there are actually people trying to do it. And when we realized that, when we realized there was this marked shift happening, we thought, ‘that's not only contemporary, it's also an age old problem—the Pharaohs, the elites, getting to live a certain way while everyone else drags behind."

=== Acting ===
Acting in film, Scheider performed in Words and Pictures directed by Fred Schepisi opposite Clive Owen and Juliet Binoche, which premiered at the 2013 Toronto International Film Festival and was released nationally in 2014.

On television, Scheider guest starred on ABC's primetime series Forever, starring Ioan Gruffudd. Onstage in 2015, Scheider performed in the two-man play RED by John Logan, at Guild Hall with Victor Slezak as Mark Rothko. In 2017, he performed in Are You Now Or Have You Ever Been... by Eric Bently with James Earl Jones and Matthew Broderick.

=== Public programming ===
Since 2012, Scheider has created and toured multiple series of free public programming at libraries across the East End of Long Island.

Film programs have included: Alan Lomax: Video Archives, Visions of Utopia: Idealized Pictures of the World, Plays on Film, The Claustrophobia of Wealth, Precocious Cinema: Children's Films for Adults, The Fourth Branch: Journalism and Democracy, Life On The American Moral Margin: Kevorkian, Scopes, Kinsey, Poncelet, and A Holiday with Tati.

Music programs have included: The Female Masters of Jazz: Hunter, Smith, Waters, Williams, Armstrong, and Alone at the Piano: Landmark Solo Recordings, Songs Of The Voiceless: America's Folk Musicians

Literary programs have included: Great American Playwrights: Odets, Wilder, Williams, Inge, and Stella Adler: The Teacher As Critic.

== Personal life ==
Scheider has an adopted sister, Molly Mae Scheider, and a half-sister, Maximillia Connelly Lord, a designer who died in 2006 of leukemia.

== Acting filmography ==
- Money Plays (1998)
- Words and Pictures (2013)
- Forever (2015)

== Filmography ==
- In My Hands (2012)
- A Dream Conferred (2005)
- The Tree Prophet (2015)
- The Sunny Center (2018)
