= Ryan Reynolds filmography =

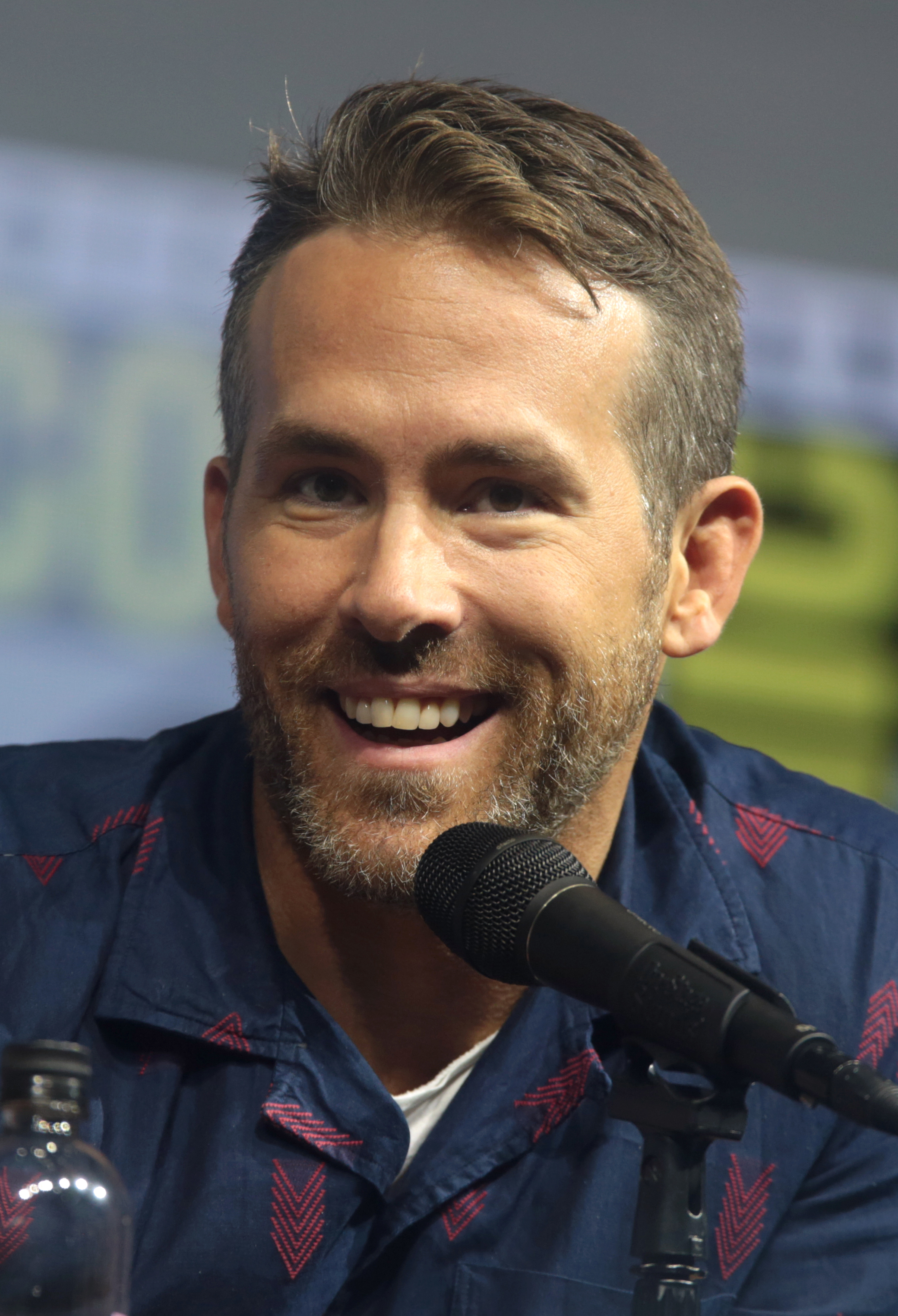
Reynolds speaking at the 2018 San Diego Comic-Con

Ryan Reynolds is a Canadian actor and producer. He made his acting debut on television in the teen drama Fifteen in 1991. Two years later, he made his feature film debut by playing an orphan raised in India, who is inspired by Mahatma Gandhi to go on a hunger strike in a small town in Canada in Ordinary Magic (1993). Reynolds had a recurring role on the television show The Odyssey (1993). He followed this with minor appearances on The X-Files (1996), and the television film Sabrina the Teenage Witch (1996). His breakthrough role was as medical student Michael "Berg" Bergen in the sitcom Two Guys and a Girl.

He also played a slacker in Van Wilder (2002), and vampire hunter Hannibal King in Blade: Trinity (2004) with Wesley Snipes. Reynolds appeared in lead roles in the commercially successful romantic comedies Just Friends (2005), Definitely, Maybe (2008), and The Proposal (2009). In 2010, he played a military contractor who is captured by terrorists in the psychological thriller Buried. The following year, Reynolds starred in the title role of the superhero film Green Lantern, which received a generally negative reception from the critics and underperformed at the box office, leading to a decline in his career. In 2013, he voiced a garden snail in Turbo and a caveman in The Croods. Two years later, he appeared in the drama Mississippi Grind and played lawyer E. Randol Schoenberg in Woman in Gold.

Reynolds experienced a career turnaround when he played the titular antihero in the superhero film Deadpool (2016), which he also produced. It received generally positive reviews from critics, especially for his irreverent comedic performance, and Reynolds garnered a nomination for the Golden Globe Award for Best Actor – Motion Picture Musical or Comedy. The film was also a commercial success, grossing a worldwide total of over $782 million at the box-office. He reprised the role in its 2018 and 2024 sequels Deadpool 2 and Deadpool & Wolverine, both of which also achieved critical and commercial success. The latter became the highest grossing R-rated film of all time, with a worldwide gross of over $1.338 billion.

== Film ==
List of Ryan Reynolds film credits
Year	Title	Roles	Notes	Ref.
1993	Ordinary Magic	Jeffrey "Ganesh" Moore		
1997	The Alarmist	Howard Ancona		
1999	Coming Soon	Henry Lipschitz		
1999	Dick	Chip		
2000	Boltneck	Karl	Originally known as Big Monster on Campus	
2001	Finder's Fee	Quigley		
2002	Van Wilder	Van Wilder		
2002	Buying the Cow	Mike Hanson		
2003	The In-Laws	Mark Tobias		
2003	Foolproof	Kevin		
2004	Harold & Kumar Go to White Castle	Male nurse		
2004	Blade: Trinity	Hannibal King		
2005	The Amityville Horror	George Lutz		
2005	Waiting...	Monty		
2005	Just Friends	Chris Brander		
2006	Smokin' Aces	Richard Messner		
2007	The Nines	Gary / Gavin / Gabriel (Note: In this film, Reynolds played three different characters.)		
2008	Chaos Theory	Frank Allen		
2008	Definitely, Maybe	Will Hayes		
2008	Fireflies in the Garden	Michael		
2009	Adventureland	Mike Connell		
2009	X-Men Origins: Wolverine	Wade Wilson / Weapon XI (Note: In this film, Reynolds plays a character known by different names.)	Additional dialogue	
2009	The Proposal	Andrew Paxton		
2009	Paper Man	Captain Excellent		
2010	Buried	Paul Conroy		
2011	Green Lantern	Hal Jordan / Green Lantern		
2011	The Change-Up	Mitch Planko		
2011	The Whale	Narrator	Also executive producer	
2012	Safe House	Matt Weston		
2012	Ted	Jared	Uncredited cameo	
2013	The Croods	Guy (voice)		
2013	Turbo	Turbo (voice)		
2013	R.I.P.D.	Nick Walker		
2014	The Voices	Jerry Hickfang / Bosco, Mr. Whiskers, The Deer, and Bunny Monkey (voices)		
2014	The Captive	Matthew		
2014	A Million Ways to Die in the West	Cowboy	Uncredited cameo	
2015	Mississippi Grind	Curtis		
2015	Woman in Gold	E. Randol Schoenberg		
2015	Self/less	Young Damian / Edward		
2016	Criminal	CIA Agent Bill Pope	Cameo	
2016	Deadpool	Wade Wilson / Deadpool	Also producer	
2017	No Good Deed	Wade Wilson / Deadpool	Short film; also writer	
2017	Life	Rory Adams		
2017	The Hitman's Bodyguard	Michael Bryce		
2018	Deadpool 2	Wade Wilson / Deadpool, Juggernaut, Himself	Also producer and writer	
2019	Great Bear Rainforest	Narrator	Documentary	
2019	Detective Pikachu	Detective Pikachu (voice) / Harry Goodman (voice)		
2019	Hobbs & Shaw	Victor Locke / Eteon Director (voice)	Credited as Champ Nightengale	
2019	6 Underground	One		
2020	The Croods: A New Age	Guy (voice)		
2021	Hitman's Wife's Bodyguard	Michael Bryce		
2021	Deadpool and Korg React	Wade Wilson / Deadpool	Short film; also producer and director	
2021	Free Guy	Guy / Dude (Note: Reynolds played two different characters in this film.)	Provides the voice and facial capture for Dude; also producer	
2021	Red Notice	Nolan Booth		
2022	The Adam Project	Adam Reed	Also producer	
2022	Bullet Train	Carver	Uncredited cameo	
2022	Spirited	Clint Briggs		
2022	Shotgun Wedding	—N/a	Executive producer only	
2023	Ghosted	Jonas	Cameo	
2024	IF	Cal	Also producer	
2024	Deadpool & Wolverine	Wade Wilson / Deadpool, Nicepool (Note: Credited as "Gordon Reynolds" for this role.)	Also producer and writer	
2025	John Candy: I Like Me	—N/a	Producer only; documentary	
2026	Mayday	Troy "Assassin" Kelly	Also producer	
2026	Man in Motion: The Rick Hansen Story	—N/a	Producer only; documentary	
2026	Avengers: Doomsday †	Wade Wilson / Deadpool	Post-production; Also credited for Additional Literary Material	
2027	Animal Friends †	Pony (voice)	Post-production; also executive producer	
TBA	Eloise †		Post-production; also producer	

== Television ==
List of Ryan Reynolds television credits
Year	Title	Role(s)	Notes	Ref.
1991–1993	Hillside	Billy Simpson	13 episodes; aka Fifteen	
1993–1994	The Odyssey	Macro / Lee (Note: Reynolds played two different characters in this television show.)	13 episodes	
1994	My Name is Kate	Kevin Bannister	Television film	
1995–1998	The Outer Limits	Paul Nodel / Derek Tillman	3 episodes	
1995	Serving in Silence: The Margarethe Cammermeyer Story	Andy	Television film	
1996	The X-Files	Jay "Boom" DeBoom	Episode: "Syzygy"	
1996	The John Larroquette Show	Tony Hemingway	Episode: "Napping to Success"	
1996	When Friendship Kills	Ben	Television film; aka A Secret Between Friends: 'A Moment of Truth' Movie	
1996	Sabrina the Teenage Witch	Seth	Television film	
1996	In Cold Blood	Bobby Rupp	Television miniseries	
1998	Tourist Trap	Wade Early	Television film	
1998–2001	Two Guys and a Girl	Michael "Berg" Bergen		
2003	Scrubs	Spence	Episode: "My Dream Job"	
2004–2005	Zeroman	Ty Cheese	13 episodes; Voice	
2005	School of Life	Michael "Mr. D" D'Angelo	Television film	
2009, 2017, 2019	Saturday Night Live	Host / Himself	Episodes: "Ryan Reynolds/Lady Gaga" (Host); "Melissa McCarthy/Haim"; "Will Ferrell/King Princess" (Cameo)	
2010	Sesame Street	Himself		
2011, 2012, 2017	Family Guy	Himself / Overweight Guy	3 episodes; Voice	
2012	Top Gear	Himself		
2013	Murder in Manhattan	—N/a	Executive producer; Television film	
2017–2026	The Late Show with Stephen Colbert	Himself / Deadpool	6 episodes, including the series finale	
2020	Jeopardy! The Greatest of All Time	Himself	1 episode	
2020	Don't	Commentator	Also executive producer	
2021	Corner Gas Animated	Himself	Episode: "Ruby Re-Burn"; Voice cameo	
2022	My Next Guest Needs No Introduction with David Letterman	Himself	Episode: "Ryan Reynolds"	
2022–present	Welcome to Wrexham	Himself	Also co-creator and executive producer	
2023	American Auto	Himself	Episode: "Celebrity"; Credited as Champ Nightengale	
2023	Bedtime Stories with Ryan	Himself	Children's television series	
2024	All Town Aren't We	Himself	Documentary series	
2024	Marvel Studios: Assembled	Himself	Episode: "The Making of Deadpool & Wolverine"	

Key
†	Denotes television shows that have not yet been released

== Video games ==
Year	Title	Role(s)	Notes	Ref.
2011	Green Lantern: Rise of the Manhunters	Hal Jordan / Green Lantern (Note: In this video game, Reynolds voiced a character known by different names.)	Voice	
2018	Marvel Strike Force	Wade Wilson / Deadpool	Voice	
2021, 2024	Fortnite Battle Royale	Guy, Wade Wilson / Deadpool		
2022	FIFA 23	Himself	Voice	

== Music and web videos ==
List of Ryan Reynolds music and web video credits
Year	Title	Artist	Role	Notes	Ref.
2009	"Threw It on the Ground"	The Lonely Island	Himself	Premiered on Saturday Night Live as Host	
2016	"Honest Trailers – Deadpool (Feat. Deadpool)"	Honest Trailers	Wade Wilson / Deadpool (voice) (Note: In this video, Reynolds played a character known by different names.)		
2017	"Honest Trailers – Logan (Feat. Deadpool) – 200th Episode!!"	Honest Trailers	Wade Wilson / Deadpool (voice)		
2018	"Honest Trailers – Deadpool 2 (Feat. Deadpool)"	Honest Trailers	Wade Wilson / Deadpool (voice)		
2018	"Ashes"	Celine Dion	Wade Wilson / Deadpool	Deadpool 2 opening credits theme song	
2019	"You Need to Calm Down"	Taylor Swift	Painter	Cameo	
2024	"Chk Chk Boom"	Stray Kids	News presenter (wearing both suit and Deadpool costumes)	Cameo	

== See also ==
- List of awards and nominations received by Ryan Reynolds
