= The Ricki Lake Show (2012 talk show) =

American syndicated talk show (2012–2013)

- Presented by: Ricki Lake
- Country of origin: United States
- Original language: English
- No. of seasons: 1
- No. of episodes: 186

Production
- Executive producers: Lisa Kridos, Gail Steinberg
- Production location: Culver Studios
- Running time: 60 minutes
- Production companies: Monet Lane Productions; 20th Television

Original release
- Network: Syndication
- Release: September 10, 2012 – June 19, 2013

Related
- Ricki Lake

The Ricki Lake Show (also known as Ricki or The New Ricki Lake Show) is an American first-run syndicated talk show hosted by Ricki Lake. The series also marked her return to talk television after leaving the genre in 2004. After several years of considering coming back to daytime with a new talk show, Lake signed on as both host and producer with 20th Television for this project, which debuted in United States and Canada on September 10, 2012, and began taping episodes on July 25, 2012, at the Culver Studios. The show is co-produced by both Twentieth Television and Monet Lane Productions.

== Topicality ==
Lake's second talk show was very different from her old show, which focused more on taking topics from the younger person's point of view. Additionally, the topics were not as sensational as the previous incarnation. According to 20th Television, the "show will present topical conversation reflecting Ricki's own personal journey and recent life experiences. As her fans have grown up with Ricki, a combination of relevant themes personal to the host and her audience including family, marriage, parenting, divorce, weight loss and overall well-being are being explored for the program."

In March 2012, Lake launched an interactive platform called "Friends of Ricki" that put members of the public in direct contact with Lake and production staff as they plan the new venture. It also unveiled Ricki, a digital magazine containing parenting, fashion and fitness advice, which can be downloaded for free through iTunes, Google Play and the Amazon.com App store.

== History and timeline ==
Lake had considered getting back into the talk genre since October 2005, just a year after her original show ended in 2004. At that time, Broadcasting & Cable magazine reported that Lake might return to do a "new" version of her show. A source said it would be a surprise if there was no deal struck by October 2005. If it were to have happened, it would have likely debuted in September 2006. Right around the time the "new" version of her show would have been proposed, Lake was hosting Gameshow Marathon for CBS. Lake did not appear at the 2006 NATPE convention to pitch the proposed program to television stations in the United States, only furthering speculation that there would be no show. In a 2009 interview on CNN, she was asked about what was next for her. Lake noted that a follow-up documentary was coming out, and that she was in talks to do another talk show, however this has yet to come to pass. In follow-up interviews since then, such as Oprah in 2010, Lake had consistently said "never say never" about hosting a new show, but that she is happy working on other projects. However, in a February 2011 appearance on The View, when asked about doing another show, Lake said that she "misses the platform" and that when it comes to hosting another show, "that's certainly a possibility."

In March 2011, reports flourished that Lake would be making a possible television comeback in 2012. A month later, on April 20, Twentieth Television announced that it would develop Lake's new program.

On May 23, 2011, a U.S. federal trademark registration number 85328080 was filed by 20th Century Fox Film Corporation, giving a description for the new show with the title as The Ricki Lake Show. The request for the title was approved, with Lake herself just required to sign off. In June 2011, a logo banner for The Ricki Lake Show appeared on the websites for trade magazines such as TelevisionWeek and Broadcasting & Cable. In August 2011, an ad for the new show appeared on its YouTube channel.

In November 2011, The Ricki Lake Show was sold to stations across the United States, and other countries. Though the show was picked up by some stations, the producers were officially waiting for a launch group, with Fox and/or NBC being a possibility. According to the industry trade TVNewsCheck, "many syndication observers say NBC stations and Fox stations may end up cherry-picking Jeff Probst and Ricki Lake in large TV markets". (Survivor host Probst debuted his daytime talk show also in September 2012.) On November 8, 2011, Twentieth announced that 11 of Tribune Broadcasting's stations picked up the show, with WPIX/New York City using the show to replace Anderson, which it lost to Fox-owned WNYW in 2012 due to the lackluster performance and timeslot WPIX had with the program. On November 17, 2011, Lake's show was cleared in over 50% of the United States, with most of the major market commitments coming from Fox (including its co-owned KTTV/Los Angeles and WFLD/Chicago), Local TV and Sinclair stations. By December 2011, Twentieth reported that the show had been cleared in over 80% of the country with more broadcasters (including Journal Communications and Hearst Television) adding the program to their outlets. By January 2012, the show had been cleared in over 90% of the country. Lake cited her performance on Dancing with the Stars as the reason behind the interest in her show.

On February 4, 2013, it was announced that The Ricki Lake Show would not return for a second season due to low ratings, with the series averaging only 926,000 viewers. Despite not being renewed for another season, The Ricki Lake Show continued production until March 21, 2013 and reruns aired throughout the summer. The series aired for the final time on September 6, 2013.

== Critical response ==
Lake's return to daytime television was welcomed by critics, who saw her as the possible successor to Oprah Winfrey, by whom Lake was inspired. Brian Lowry of Variety explored the possibility for this series to be as successful as her first, saying that he "thinks she makes sense. I don't know that there's a big clamoring for another talk show, and one fronted by her, but the truth is that she's done it."

Kevin Downey of TV NewsCheck also gave the show a positive review during an interview with Lake after having attended a taping, noting that "This time, they (referring to the audience) just seem to want Lake to know they're happy she's back."

== Ratings ==
Out of the five new talk shows to premiere during the 2012–2013 television season, Ricki Lake ranked fourth, behind Katie, Steve Harvey, and The Jeff Probst Show, but ahead of The Trisha Goddard Show. Katie, Probst, and Trisha have since been cancelled, leaving Harvey as the only one to successfully do well in the ratings. During the week of November 5, 2012, Ricki Lake averaged 924,000 viewers.

== International broadcasts ==
Global picked up the program for Canada, which debuted the program on September 10, 2012, the same date as the US airing. The series has also been acquired by FX (UK) who will air the show as part of a rebrand, becoming Fox.

== Awards and nominations ==
Lake was nominated for Favorite New Talk Show host for the series at the 39th People's Choice Awards, but lost to Steve Harvey.

Lake was nominated and won a Daytime Emmy Award for the category of "Outstanding Talk Show Host" June 16, 2013.
