= List of awards and nominations received by Ryan Reynolds =

Ryan Reynolds awards and nominations
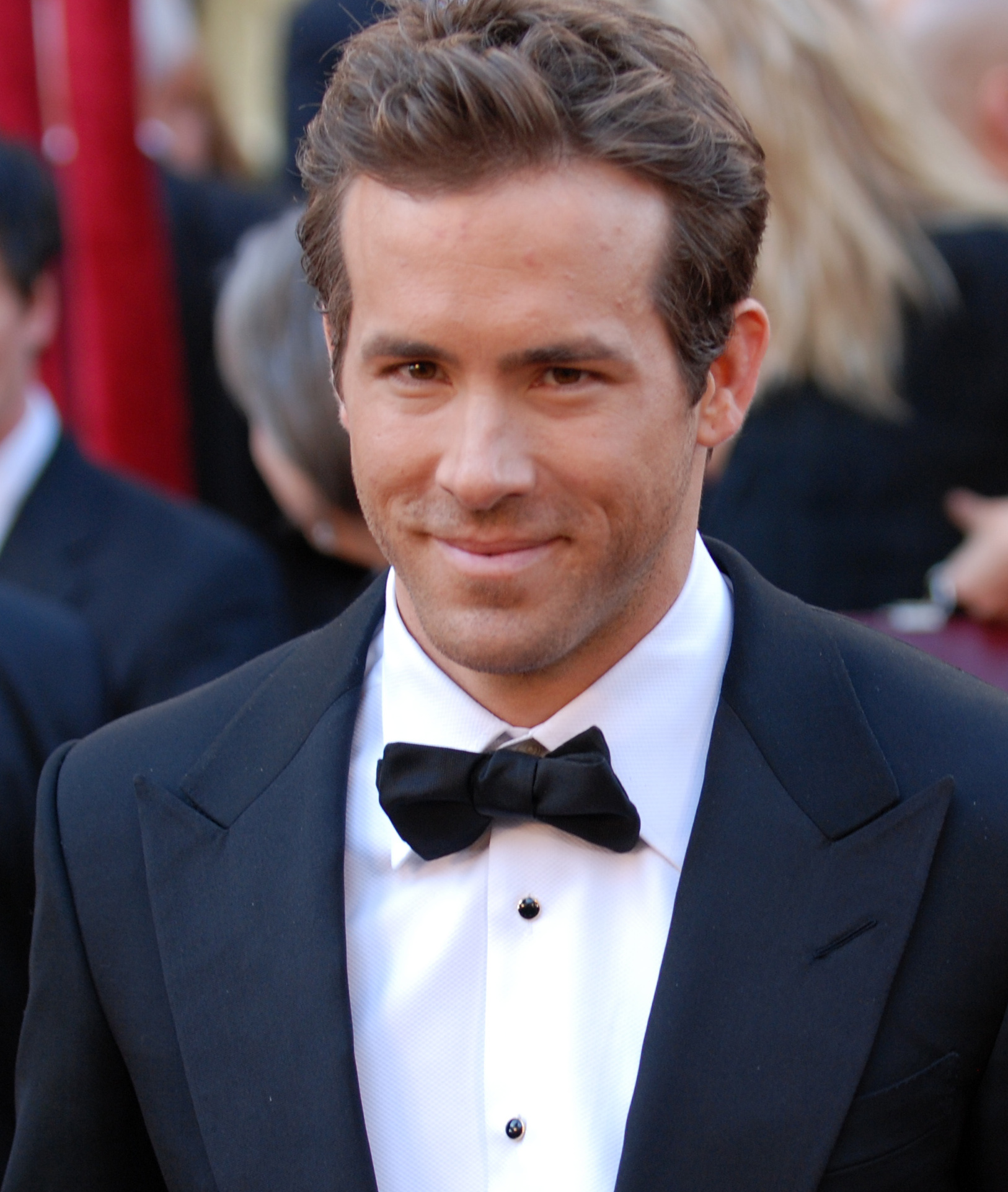
- Reynolds at the 82nd Academy Awards
Awards and nominations
Award	Wins	Nominations
Critics' Choice Awards	1	6
Golden Globes	0	1
Grammy Awards	0	2
Primetime Emmy Awards	2	5
Producers Guild of America Awards	2	4

Totals (Note: Certain award groups do not simply award one winner. They acknowledge several different recipients, have runners-up, and have third place. Since this is a specific recognition and is different from losing an award, runner-up mentions are considered wins in this award tally. For simplification and to avoid errors, each award in this list has been presumed to have had a prior nomination.)
- Wins: 18
- Nominations: 82

The following is a list of awards and nominations received by Canadian-American actor Ryan Reynolds.

== Major associations ==
=== Critics' Choice Awards ===
Year	Category	Nominated work	Result	Ref.
Movie Awards
2016	Best Actor in an Action Movie	Deadpool	Nominated	
2016	Best Actor in a Comedy	Deadpool	Won	
2019	Best Actor in a Comedy	Deadpool 2	Nominated	
Super Awards
2022	Best Actor in a Science Fiction/Fantasy Movie	Free Guy	Nominated	
2023	Best Actor in a Science Fiction/Fantasy Movie	The Adam Project	Nominated	
2025	Best Actor in a Superhero Movie	Deadpool & Wolverine	Nominated	

=== Golden Globes ===
Year	Category	Nominated work	Result	Ref.
2017	Best Actor in a Motion Picture – Musical or Comedy	Deadpool	Nominated	

=== Grammy Awards ===
Year	Category	Nominated work	Result	Ref.
2019	Best Compilation Soundtrack for Visual Media	Deadpool 2	Nominated	
2025	Best Compilation Soundtrack for Visual Media	Deadpool & Wolverine	Nominated	

=== Primetime Emmy Awards ===
Year	Category	Nominated work	Result	Ref.
2024 (I)	Outstanding Unstructured Reality Program	Welcome to Wrexham	Won	
2024 (II)	Outstanding Unstructured Reality Program	Welcome to Wrexham	Won	
2025	Outstanding Unstructured Reality Program	Welcome to Wrexham	Nominated	
2026	Outstanding Documentary or Nonfiction Special	John Candy: I Like Me	Nominated	
2026	Outstanding Unstructured Reality Program	Welcome to Wrexham	Nominated	

=== Producers Guild of America Awards ===
Year	Category	Nominated work	Result	Ref.
2017	Outstanding Producer of Theatrical Motion Pictures	Deadpool	Nominated	
2024	Outstanding Producer of Non-Fiction Television	Welcome to Wrexham	Won	
2025	Outstanding Producer of Non-Fiction Television	Welcome to Wrexham	Nominated	
2026	Outstanding Producer of Televised or Streamed Motion Picture	John Candy: I Like Me	Won	

== Minor associations ==
Ceremony	Year	Category	Nominated work	Result	Ref.
American Cinematheque Awards	2022	Career Achievement	—	Honored	
Astra Film Awards	2020	Best Animated or VSX Performance	Detective Pikachu	Nominated	
Canadian Screen Awards	2015	Best Actor	The Captive	Nominated	
Canadian Screen Awards	2023	Humanitarian Award	—	Honored	
Dublin Film Critics' Circle Awards	2010	Best Actor	Buried	Nominated	
Empire Awards	2017	Best Actor	Deadpool	Nominated	
Fangoria Chainsaw Awards	2011	Best Actor	Buried	Won	
Gaudí Awards	2011	Best Actor in a Leading Role	Buried	Nominated	
Gotham Awards	2009	Best Ensemble Performance	Adventureland	Nominated	
Goya Awards	2011	Best Actor	Buried	Nominated	
Hollywood Music in Media Awards	2022	Best Music Themed Film, Biopic, or Musical (Note: Shared with the directors and producers of the film)	Spirited	Nominated	
MTV Movie & TV Awards	2003	Best Breakthrough Male Performance	Van Wilder	Nominated	
MTV Movie & TV Awards	2010	Best Comedic Performance	The Proposal	Nominated	
MTV Movie & TV Awards	2010	Best Kiss (Note: Shared with Sandra Bullock)	The Proposal	Nominated	
MTV Movie & TV Awards	2010	Best Fight (Note: Shared with Hugh Jackman and Liev Schreiber)	X-Men Origins: Wolverine	Nominated	
MTV Movie & TV Awards	2011	Best Scared-As-Shit Performance	Buried	Nominated	
MTV Movie & TV Awards	2016	Best Male Performance	Deadpool	Nominated	
MTV Movie & TV Awards	2016	Best Action Performance	Deadpool	Nominated	
MTV Movie & TV Awards	2016	Best Comedic Performance	Deadpool	Won	
MTV Movie & TV Awards	2016	Best Kiss (Note: Shared with Morena Baccarin)	Deadpool	Nominated	
MTV Movie & TV Awards	2016	Best Fight (Note: Shared with Ed Skrein)	Deadpool	Won	
MTV Movie & TV Awards	2022	Best Comedic Performance	Free Guy	Won	
MTV Movie & TV Awards	2022	Best Team (Note: Shared with Walker Scobell)	The Adam Project	Nominated	
Nickelodeon Kids' Choice Awards	2021	Favorite Voice from an Animated Movie	The Croods: A New Age	Nominated	
Nickelodeon Kids' Choice Awards	2022	Favorite Movie Actor	Free Guy and Red Notice	Nominated	
Nickelodeon Kids' Choice Awards	2023	Favorite Movie Actor	The Adam Project	Nominated	
Nickelodeon Kids' Choice Awards	2024	Favorite Movie Actor	IF	Nominated	
People's Choice Awards	2010	Favorite Movie Actor	—	Nominated	
People's Choice Awards	2010	Favorite Comedy Star	—	Nominated	
People's Choice Awards	2010	Favorite On-Screen Team	The Proposal	Nominated	
People's Choice Awards	2010	Favorite On-Screen Team (Note: Shared with Daniel Henney, Hugh Jackman, Dominic Monaghan, Liev Schreiber, and Will.i.am)	X-Men Origins: Wolverine	Nominated	
People's Choice Awards	2012	Favorite Movie Actor	—	Nominated	
People's Choice Awards	2012	Favorite Action Movie Star	—	Nominated	
People's Choice Awards	2012	Favorite Comedic Movie Star	—	Nominated	
People's Choice Awards	2012	Favorite Movie Superhero	Green Lantern	Won	
People's Choice Awards	2017	Favorite Movie Actor	—	Won	
People's Choice Awards	2017	Favorite Action Movie Actor	—	Nominated	
People's Choice Awards	2018	The Action Movie Star of 2018	Deadpool 2	Nominated	
People's Choice Awards	2018	The Most Hype Worthy Canadian of 2018	—	Nominated	
People's Choice Awards	2019	The Animated Movie Star of 2019	Detective Pikachu	Nominated	
People's Choice Awards	2021	The Male Movie Star of 2021	Free Guy	Nominated	
People's Choice Awards	2021	The Comedy Movie Star of 2021	Free Guy	Nominated	
People's Choice Awards	2022	The Male Movie Star of 2022	The Adam Project	Nominated	
People's Choice Awards	2022	The Comedy Movie Star of 2022	The Adam Project	Nominated	
People's Choice Awards	2022	People's Icon Award	—	Honored	
San Diego Film Critics Society Awards	2016	Best Comedic Performance	Deadpool	Nominated	
San Diego Film Critics Society Awards	2018	Best Comedic Performance	Deadpool 2	Nominated	
Saturn Awards	2011	Best Actor	Buried	Nominated	
Saturn Awards	2017	Best Actor	Deadpool	Won	
Saturn Awards	2025	Best Actor	Deadpool & Wolverine	Nominated	
Saturn Awards	2025	Best Film Writing (Note: Shared with Shawn Levy)	Deadpool & Wolverine	Nominated	
Streamy Awards	2017	Best Collaboration	Honest Trailers (episode: "Logan feat. Deadpool")	Won	
Teen Choice Awards	2005	Choice Movie: Scary Scene	The Amityville Horror	Won	
Teen Choice Awards	2009	Choice Summer Movie Actor	The Proposal	Nominated	
Teen Choice Awards	2009	Choice Movie: Rumble	X-Men Origins: Wolverine	Nominated	
Teen Choice Awards	2010	Choice Movie Actor: Romantic Comedy	The Proposal	Nominated	
Teen Choice Awards	2010	Choice Movie: Chemistry	The Proposal	Nominated	
Teen Choice Awards	2010	Choice Movie: Liplock	The Proposal	Nominated	
Teen Choice Awards	2011	Choice Movie Actor: Sci-Fi/Fantasy	Green Lantern	Nominated	
Teen Choice Awards	2016	Choice Movie Actor: Action	Deadpool	Nominated	
Teen Choice Awards	2016	Choice Movie: Hissy Fit	Deadpool	Won	
Teen Choice Awards	2018	Choice Summer Movie Actor	Deadpool 2	Nominated	
Teen Choice Awards	2018	Choice Twit	—	Nominated	
Teen Choice Awards	2019	Choice Movie Actor: Comedy	Detective Pikachu	Nominated	
Young Artist Awards	1993	Best Young Actor Co-Starring in a Cable Series	Hillside	Nominated	

== Other honors ==
Other accolades received by Ryan Reynolds
Organization	Year	Honor	Ref.
Canada's Walk of Fame	2014	Inductee	
Entertainment Weekly	2016	Entertainer of the Year	
Hasty Pudding Theatricals	2017	Man of the Year	
Hollywood Walk of Fame	2016	Motion Picture Star	
Governor General's Awards	2021	Performing Arts Award	
Lieutenant Governor of British Columbia	2023	Order of British Columbia	
Monarchy of Canada	2025	Officer of the Order of Canada	
National Association of Theatre Owners	2011	Male Star of the Year	
People	2010	Sexiest Man Alive	
