= Rekha Shah =

Canadian television executive and actress

- Born: August 25, 1976 (age 48); Ontario, Canada
- Occupation(s): Actress, TV Executive
- Years active: 1986–present

Rekha Shah (born August 25, 1976) is a Canadian television executive and former actress, best known for her work on the internationally popular sketch comedy program You Can't Do That On Television. She also appeared on the Nickelodeon show Fifteen and hosted the 1995 season of The Space on TVOKids, before stepping behind the camera as a producer on Extreme Babysitting. Shah is currently the Director of Canadian Sales for CBS Studios.

== TV career ==
=== Acting ===
Shah became a cast member on You Can't Do That On Television during the show's 7th season, first appearing in the 1986 "Garbage" episode, and last appearing in the 1989 "Pollution" episode. According to the official fansite, she was one of the few cast members who made the leap from the "old" cast to the "new" cast in 1989, and was offered a hosting role by show creator Roger Price, but declined.

After appearing on You Can't Do That On Television from 1986 to 1989, Shah portrayed the character of "Janice" on another Canadian television program, Fifteen - a melodramatic teenage soap that lightly touched on issues teenagers faced.

=== Career behind the scenes ===
After she left acting, Shah attended Ryerson Polytechnic University in 1994 and graduated with a BA in Radio and Television arts. She then began producing television shows, with her most notable work being the YTV reality show Extreme Babysitting.

In 2005, she transitioned out of production, and into TV development and sales, becoming the manager of North American TV sales at Alliance Atlantis, and then the director of Canadian TV for Alliance Films in 2010, before leaving for Cambium Catalyst Entertainment, where she served as Vice President of Distribution and Director of International Sales.

She has been the Director of Canadian Sales for CBS Studios since 2012.
