= The Jeff Probst Show =

American syndicated talk show (2012–2013)

- Promotional Image for The Jeff Probst Show
- Genre: Talk show
- Starring: Jeff Probst; Lisa Whelchel (co-host; January–February 2013); Yvette Nicole Brown (co-host; 2013)
- Country of origin: United States
- Original language: English
- No. of seasons: 1
- No. of episodes: 170

Production
- Executive producers: Amy Coleman; Jeff Probst
- Production locations: Sunset Bronson Studios; Hollywood, California
- Running time: 40–44 minutes
- Production companies: Great Adventure Productions; Big Ticket Television

Original release
- Network: Syndication
- Release: September 10, 2012 – September 4, 2013

The Jeff Probst Show is an American syndicated talk show hosted by Survivor host Jeff Probst, who also served as an executive producer. This was his first television talk foray, which is co-produced by Big Ticket Television, and distributed by CBS Television Distribution, which handles the distribution rights in the United States and Canada. The hour-long program debuted on September 10, 2012.

On February 13, 2013, CBS Television Distribution announced the cancellation of The Jeff Probst Show after only one season. Despite the series finale airing May 22, 2013, unaired episodes were aired during the summer.

== Format ==
The program follows the same general interest format platform as Anderson Live, Katie and The Ricki Lake Show; the latter two debuted at the same time as Probst's. Each hour-long episode centered on a topic. Guests and audience members attempt to find common ground. On January 14, 2013, former The Facts of Life star and Survivor: Philippines contestant Lisa Whelchel joined Probst as co-host for several episodes.

=== "On the Couch" ===
Originally referred to as "Guys on the Couch", the "On the Couch" segment consists of a panel of guests taking questions from the audience or discussing current odd news topics.

=== "Ambush Adventure" ===
Jeff will randomly initiate an "Ambush Adventure" when he asks a guest on the show or an audience member to take a step outside their comfort zone. Prior to knowing what the Ambush Adventure is, the participant must say "yes". Once the participant agrees to the Ambush Adventure, they find out the adventure.

== Ratings ==
Week	Rating	Viewers	Ref
September 10, 2012	.7	855,000	
September 17, 2012	.7	909,000	
September 24, 2012	.7	896,000	
October 1, 2012	.8	990,000	
October 8, 2012	.7	944,000	
October 15, 2012	.7	931,000	
October 22, 2012	.7	921,000	
November 5, 2012	.7	902,000	
November 12, 2012	.7		
November 26, 2012	.8		
December 3, 2012	.7		
December 10, 2012	.7		
December 17, 2012	.7		
December 31, 2012			

== International broadcast ==
Global picked up the program for Canada, and debuted it on September 11, 2012, the same date as the U.S. airing. The series moved from an afternoon time slot to a late night. It aired in Singapore at 2pm Weekdays on MediaCorp Channel 5. In South Africa, the show aired weekdays at 6pm on SABC3.
