= Ryan Reynolds =

Canadian-American actor and entrepreneur (born 1976)

Ryan Reynolds OC OBC
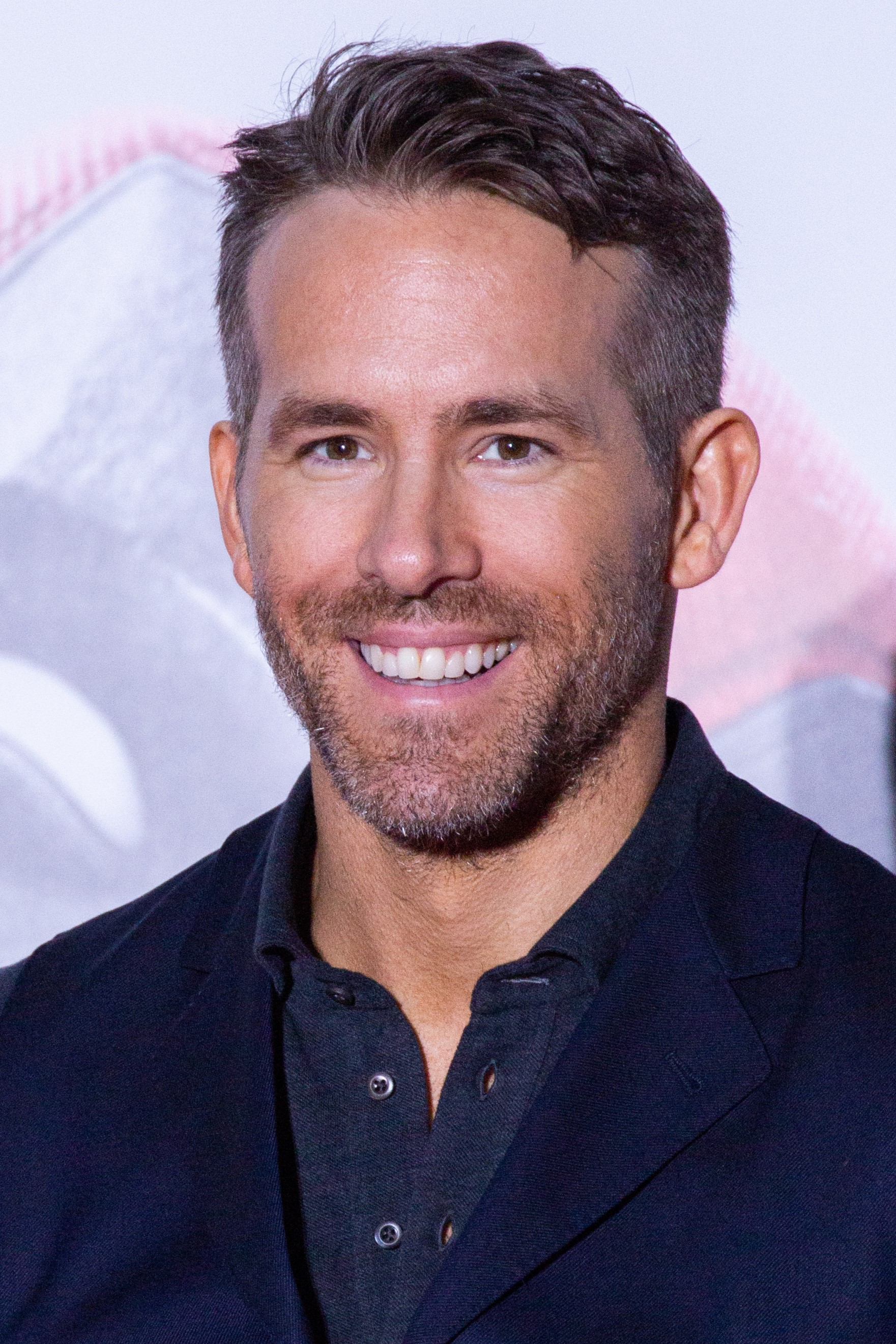
- Reynolds in 2018
- Born: Ryan Rodney Reynolds; October 23, 1976 (age 50); Vancouver, British Columbia, Canada
- Citizenship: Canada; U.S.
- Occupations: Actor; entrepreneur; film producer
- Years active: 1991–present
- Works: Full list
- Spouses: Scarlett Johansson (m. 2008; div. 2011); Blake Lively (m. 2012)
- Partner: Alanis Morissette (2002–2007)
- Children: 4
- Relatives: Chester Reynolds (grandfather)
- Awards: Full list

Ryan Rodney Reynolds (born October 23, 1976) is a Canadian and American actor, entrepreneur, and film producer. Known for starring in comedic and superhero films, he was the world's second-highest-paid actor in 2020 and 2024. Reynolds has received numerous accolades, including two Primetime Emmy Awards and nominations for two Grammy Awards and a Golden Globe Award. His films as a leading actor have grossed $6.6 billion worldwide.

Born and raised in Vancouver, Canada, Reynolds began acting at the age of thirteen, taking on small roles in various television series. He had his first lead role in the teen soap opera Hillside (1991–1993) then played the lead role in the sitcom Two Guys and a Girl (1998–2001). Reynolds later starred in a range of films, including the commercially successful romantic comedies National Lampoon's Van Wilder (2002), Waiting... (2005), and The Proposal (2009), the superhero films Blade: Trinity (2004), X-Men Origins: Wolverine (2009), and Green Lantern (2011), and the biographical drama Woman in Gold (2015).

Reynolds achieved his greatest commercial success as the titular character in the Deadpool franchise, starring in Deadpool (2016), Deadpool 2 (2018), and Deadpool & Wolverine (2024). His performance in the first received a Golden Globe nomination, while the lattermost emerged as his highest-grossing release. He has appeared in the sci-fi horror Life (2017), and action films like 6 Underground (2019), Free Guy (2021), and The Adam Project (2022). Reynolds has also lent his voice to animated films, including The Croods franchise (2013–2020), Turbo (2013), and the animated character Pikachu in Detective Pikachu (2019).

In 2017, Time included Reynolds in Time 100—its list of the 100 most influential people in the world. He was named People's Sexiest Man Alive in 2010, and was awarded a star on the Hollywood Walk of Fame in 2017. A businessman, he holds an ownership stake in Mint Mobile and is a co-owner of Welsh soccer club Wrexham; the latter is documented in the Emmy Award-winning television series Welcome to Wrexham (2022–present). Divorced from actress Scarlett Johansson, Reynolds has been married to Blake Lively since 2012, with whom he has four children.

== Early life and education ==
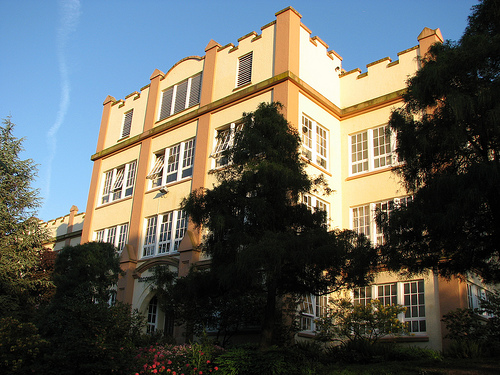
Reynolds attended Kitsilano Secondary School (pictured in 2008).

Ryan Rodney Reynolds was born in Vancouver, British Columbia, on October 23, 1976. His father, James Chester Reynolds, served as a Royal Canadian Mounted Policeman before retiring and transitioning to work as a foods wholesaler. His mother, Tamara Lee (née Stewart), worked in retail sales. Reynolds has three older brothers and has described himself not as a younger brother to them, but a "moving target" due to his brothers often getting physical, and him being unable to retaliate. He has also shared that his brothers "protected him" from their father, with whom he had a complex and somewhat estranged relationship. Reynolds's paternal grandfather, Chester, was a farmer who represented Stettler in the Legislative Assembly of Alberta from 1940 to 1944. Reynolds is of Irish descent and was raised Catholic in Vancouver's Kitsilano neighbourhood as well as in Vanier, Ontario (now part of Ottawa).

Reynolds has been involved in acting since the age of thirteen. As a teenager, he attended acting classes—which he failed—and briefly held a day job as a busboy at a restaurant, while also working night shifts at a local grocery store in Vancouver. He described his co-workers in the latter as "the funniest people on Earth" and called them "some of my biggest impressions [...] as a performer". Reynolds attended Prince of Wales Secondary School for grades nine and ten before getting expelled for stealing a teacher's car. He attended grades eleven and twelve at Kitsilano Secondary School alongside actor Joshua Jackson, graduating in 1994. Reynolds initially took on minor roles in various television series but became discouraged and left acting at nineteen to enroll at Kwantlen Polytechnic University. A few months later, he encountered fellow actor Chris William Martin, who encouraged him to give acting another chance and relocate with him to Los Angeles.

== Career ==
=== 1991–2003: Career beginnings ===
Reynolds began his career in 1991 in the Canadian teen soap opera Hillside (1991–1993), which was distributed in the United States by Nickelodeon under the title Fifteen. He portrayed Billy Simpson—a character who turned to bullying to cope with family issues and romantic rejections. He made his feature film debut in the coming-of-age drama Ordinary Magic (1993) by playing Jeffrey, an orphan raised in India, who is inspired by Mahatma Gandhi to go on a hunger strike in a small town in Canada. Directed by Giles Walker, the film generally received mixed reviews; Variety's Paul Lenti thought that the script's "overall facile characterizations and predictable plot development detract from real tension". Between 1993 and 1994, Reynolds took on the dual roles of Macro and Lee in the children's half-hour television series The Odyssey.

In 1995, Reynolds made his first The Outer Limits appearance in the episode "If These Walls Could Talk". In 1996, Reynolds made cameo appearances in television shows The X-Files and The John Larroquette Show, playing in the episodes "Syzygy" and "Napping to Success", respectively. That year, he co-starred with Melissa Joan Hart on the television film Sabrina the Teenage Witch (1996)—based on the comic book series of the same name—in which he played the titular character's love interest, Seth. Reynolds portrayed Bobby Rupp, the boyfriend of murdered teenager Nancy Clutter, in the two-part miniseries In Cold Blood (1996), an adaptation of Truman Capote's 1966 nonfiction novel of the same name. He returned to feature films with the dark comedy The Alarmist (1997), portraying Howard, the teenage son of Gale (Kate Capshaw). After both are harmed at their home, Tommy (David Arquette) begins to suspect Heinrich's (Stanley Tucci) involvement. The film received mainly negative reviews from critics. Reynolds appeared twice more in The Outer Limits, playing the character Paul Nodel in episodes from 1997 and 1998.

His breakthrough role was as medical student Michael "Berg" Bergen in Two Guys and a Girl (1998–2001; initially titled Two Guys, a Girl and a Pizza Place). Although the show was neither as critically or commercially successful as contemporary shows, Reynolds's performance received praise, with Variety—in a retrospective review—noting that his "talent and charisma [were] apparent" and that his "star quality was already in place". He later took on the minor roles of Henry Lipschitz and Chip in the comedies Coming Soon (1999) and Dick (1999), respectively. In the horror comedy Boltneck (2000), Reynolds starred as Karl, a bullied teenager who is killed and later revived by a "science nerd" named Frank Stein, while he portrayed Quigley in the drama thriller Finder's Fee (2001). He played the titular character in the romantic comedy National Lampoon's Van Wilder (2002), which was critically panned but achieved box office success. Reynolds portrayed Mark Tobias in the commercially unsuccessful action comedy film The In-Laws (2003). In the film, he is about to marry Melissa (Lindsay Sloane), before her father finds out that Mark's father is a CIA operative. He starred alongside Kristin Booth in William Phillips's heist film Foolproof (2003).

=== 2004–2009: Romantic comedies ===
Reynolds had a cameo appearance as the nurse in Harold & Kumar Go to White Castle (2004), which Entertainment Weekly described as a "single, though memorable scene". Later that year, he made his voice acting debut in the animated television series Zeroman (2004), lending his voice to former secret agent Ty Cheese. Reynolds played the role of Hannibal King in David S. Goyer's Blade: Trinity (2004), a vampire hunter who joins Blade (Wesley Snipes) and Abigail Whistler (Jessica Biel) to battle Dracula and the vampire clan. To prepare for the role, Reynolds focused on gaining muscle mass, training six days a week and adhering to a 3,200-calorie diet. He gained 24 pounds (11 kg) of muscle in three months. Despite being a success at the box office, grossing $132 million on a $65 million budget, the film was negatively received by critics.

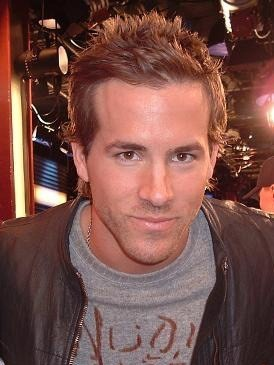
Reynolds in 2007

Reynolds starred as George Lutz in the supernatural horror film The Amityville Horror (2005)—an adaptation of the 1977 novel and remake of the 1979 film of the same name. He portrayed a man who moves into a supposedly haunted house with his wife, Kathy (Melissa George), and her children. Collider's Shawn Van Horn liked his performance, stating that he was "funny and charming, but toned down, as if he's not performing for a camera". Reynolds then starred as a charismatic waiter named Monty in Rob McKittrick's comedy Waiting... (2005). In the romantic comedy Just Friends (2005), he played Chris Brander, an overweight high schooler trying to escape the "friend zone" with his best friend (Amy Smart), during a Christmas visit to his hometown. To portray this character, he wore a fat suit and makeup. He later played FBI agent Richard Messner in the crime action film Smokin' Aces (2006) alongside Ray Liotta. In the science fiction film The Nines (2007), Reynolds played three distinct characters—Gary, Gavin, and Gabriel—in three separate storylines, exploring themes of reality, identity, and the nature of existence.

In 2008, Reynolds played Frank Allen in Chaos Theory, directed by Marcos Siega. He portrayed a highly disciplined efficiency expert whose marital crisis prompts a shift towards an unpredictable and spontaneous lifestyle. Critics acknowledged Reynolds's performance even though the film itself received poor reception, with The Seattle Times commenting that he "has the sort of blandly dazzling [...] It's a fine performance; too bad it's lost in a muddled movie." His next role was in the romantic comedy Definitely, Maybe (2008), in which he played Will Hayes, a man in the middle of divorce proceedings who is questioned by his daughter about how he and her mother first met. In Fireflies in the Garden (2008), he portrayed a successful novelist who comes back to his Midwestern family, only to discover that his mother has died in a car accident.

Reynolds starred in Greg Mottola's romantic comedy Adventureland (2009), in which he played Mike Connell, a technician and part-time musician who is having an affair with Em (Kristen Stewart). The film was praised by many critics; Collider retrospectively called his performance one of the most underrated of his career. He later played the role of Wade Wilson / Deadpool / Weapon XI in the superhero film X-Men Origins: Wolverine (2009). As early as 2005, Reynolds had expressed interest in and involvement with a potential Deadpool film adaptation, again collaborating with Goyer. The film received mixed but generally negative reviews from critics; Reynolds himself described developing it as a "frustrating experience", arguing that "it's the wrong version [...] Deadpool isn't correct in it". Reynolds starred as Andrew Paxton in Anne Fletcher's commercially successful romantic comedy The Proposal (2009). Critics praised the on-screen chemistry between Reynolds and co-star Sandra Bullock. He played Captain Excellent in the negatively-received comedy drama film Paper Man (2009).

=== 2010–2015: Genre experimentation and career fluctuations ===
In 2010, he made a guest appearance on the children's television show Sesame Street. Reynolds's only film role that year was in the Spanish and American survival thriller film Buried (2010), directed by Rodrigo Cortés. He played the role of Paul Conroy, an American truck driver in Iraq who finds himself buried alive in a coffin and must find a way to escape. Buried garnered significant commendation from critics, with a segment of Rotten Tomatoes' consensus noting it as a "nerve-wracking display of [...] Reynolds' talent". He played the titular character in Martin Campbell's superhero film Green Lantern (2011). The film was a critical and commercial failure, underperforming at the box office and receiving negative reviews. Reynolds played Mitch Planko in David Dobkin's romantic comedy The Change-Up (2011). The film received negative reviews, but both Reynolds and co-star Jason Bateman received praise by Rolling Stone's for their performances. Reynolds executive-produced and narrated the documentary film The Whale (2011).

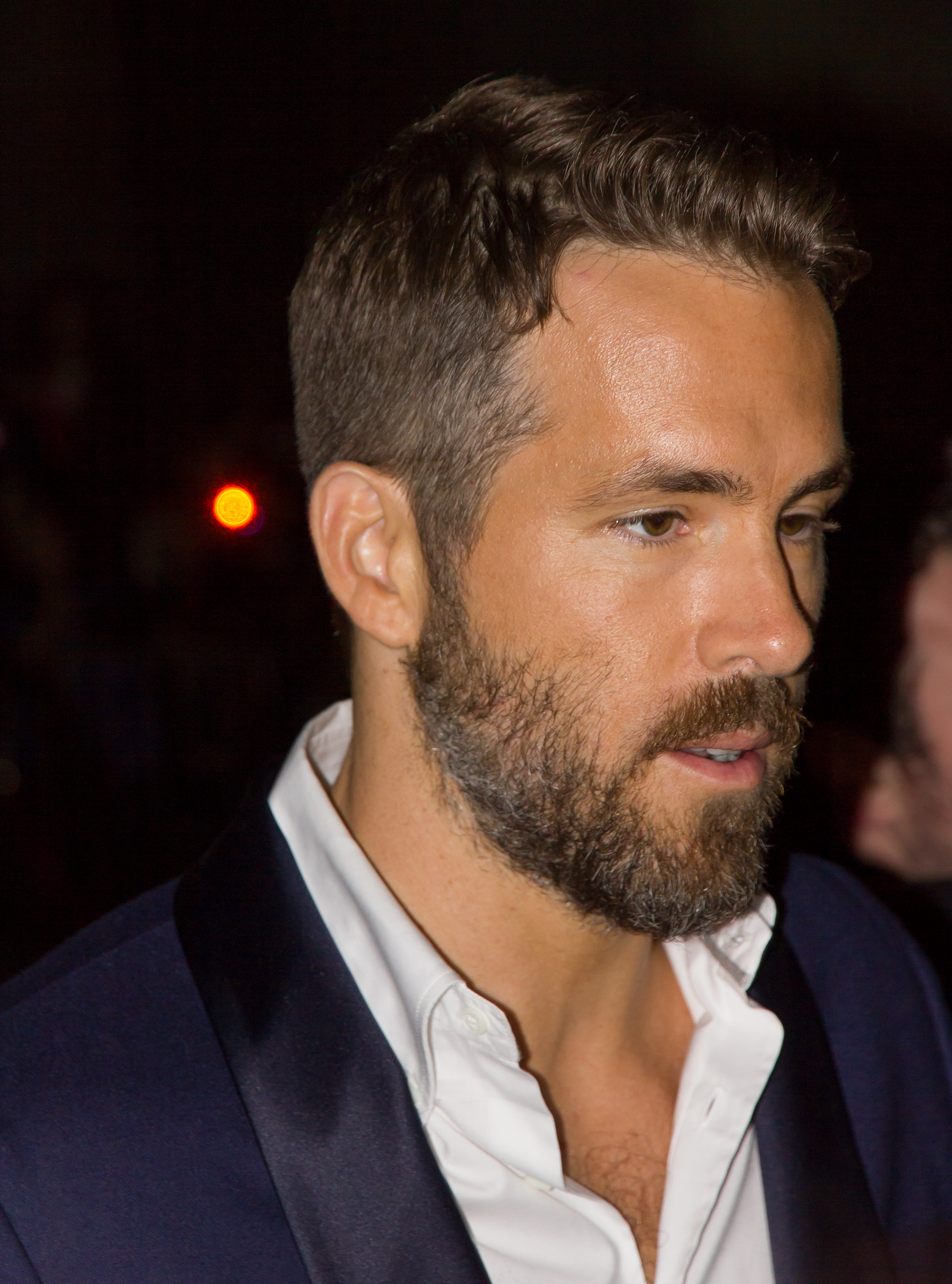
Reynolds at the 2014 Toronto International Film Festival

In 2012, Reynolds starred alongside Denzel Washington in the action thriller Safe House, directed by Daniel Espinosa. Set in Cape Town, South Africa, Reynolds played Matt Weston, a CIA agent. His safe house is breached by mercenaries after Tobin Frost (Washington) is captured, forcing them to escape and find another house. While the film received mixed reviews, some critics praised Reynolds's performance, with The Hollywood Reporter describing it as "surprisingly well acted" and IGN highlighting it as a "terrific performance that is sure to be a highlight in his [...] career". He made a cameo appearance as Jared in the comedy Ted (2012). In 2013, Reynolds had starring voice roles in two DreamWorks Animation feature films. The first was in The Croods, in which he voiced Guy, an inventive teenage caveboy who lives with his pet sloth, Belt. The second was in Turbo, where he portrayed the titular protagonist, a garden snail who gains superspeed during a street race and dreams of becoming a champion in the Indianapolis 500 and 24 Hours of Le Mans.

Reynolds played Nick Walker in R.I.P.D. (2013), a detective murdered by his partner. The film was a box-office bomb and was panned by critics; Rotten Tomatoes' consensus agreed that it was "too dim-witted and formulaic to satisfy". He took on several roles in the horror comedy film The Voices (2014), starring as Jerry Hickfang, a factory worker with schizophrenia who hears voices from his pet dog and cat, both of whom he also voiced. In 2020, Reynolds described the film as "one of my favorite movies I've ever done [...] never really got its day in court, but man, it's weird and fun and beautiful". In the psychological thriller The Captive (2014), he portrayed Matthew, a father who is determined to locate his nine-year-old daughter who has been missing for eight years, after police discover a clue on the Internet. The Captive generally received negative reception, with Vanity Fair describing it as "[Armenian-Canadian director] Atom Egoyan's [...] weird disappointment that's painfully reminiscent of his earlier, better work". Despite the debut response, Reynolds says the gala screening "was so amazing" and praises Egoyan as a premiere filmmaker of Canada.

Reynolds starred as Curtis in Anna Boden and Ryan Fleck's comedy-drama Mississippi Grind (2015). Gerry (Ben Mendelsohn), a gambling addict, believes that Curtis brings good fortune and takes him on a road trip to participate in a high-stakes poker game in New Orleans. The film received mixed reviews, though some critics liked Reynolds's performance, with Helen O'Hara of British GQ calling it his "best performance in years" and Variety's Justin Chang stating that he and Mendelsohn gave "terrific performances [...] in this bittersweet, beautifully textured road movie". In Simon Curtis's biographical drama Woman in Gold (2015), Reynolds portrayed E. Randol Schoenberg, a young lawyer who assists Maria Altmann (Helen Mirren) in her legal fight to recover her family's stolen Gustav Klimt painting, Portrait of Adele Bloch-Bauer I (1907). He later starred in the science fiction film Self/less (2015), which was critically panned and underperformed at the box office.

=== 2016–present: Stardom with Deadpool and established actor ===
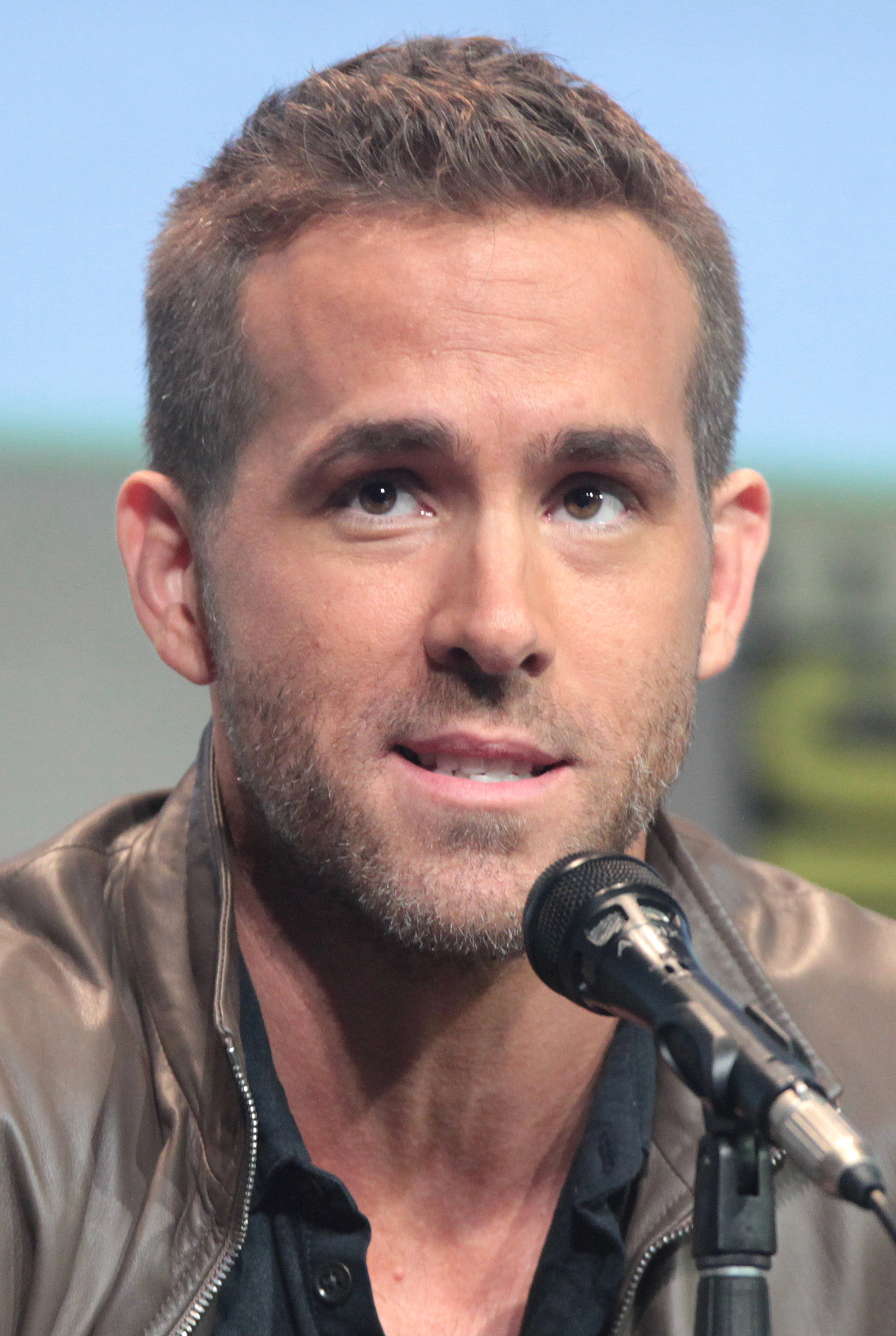
Reynolds promoting Deadpool at the 2015 San Diego Comic-Con

Reynolds found significant critical and commercial success with the superhero film Deadpool (2016), which had been in development since as early as 2000. In the Cable and Deadpool #2 comic published in 2004, Ryan Reynolds is referenced directly when Deadpool says he looks like "Ryan [Reynolds] crossed with Shar-Pei". Eventually, he portrayed Wade Wilson / Weapon XI in X-Men Origins: Wolverine (2009) and became heavily involved in the development of a film based on Deadpool. The film introduced a reboot of the character, dismissing the events of X-Men Origins: Wolverine and establishing a new backstory that aligns more closely with the original Marvel Comics. Reynolds chose not to get paid for Deadpool to ensure the film's release and used the small amount he did receive to have co-writers Rhett Reese and Paul Wernick on set with him. Deadpool was a commercial success, grossing $782 million, making it the ninth-highest-grossing film of 2016. Several critics praised Reynolds's performance in Deadpool, with Michael O'Sullivan from The Washington Post praising Reynolds for making Deadpool a likeable character as well as the film's action scenes. IGN's Daniel Krupa was impressed by his "charismatic, exuberant, and larger-than-life [performance], which isn't easy considering how much of the film he spends either in a full-body costume or beneath heavy prosthetics".

Reynolds had a supporting role in Ariel Vromen's action thriller Criminal (2016). He played Bill Pope, who is tortured and killed early in the film while traveling to a secret meeting with a hacker capable of launching missiles at will. The film received negative reviews from critics. The following year, Reynolds reunited with Espinosa, playing the engineer Rory Adams in the science fiction film Life (2017). It received mixed reviews from critics but performed well at the box office. Reynolds next starred in Patrick Hughes's action comedy film The Hitman's Bodyguard (2017). He played Michael Bryce, an executive protection agent and former CIA officer hired to protect assassin Darius Kincaid (Samuel L. Jackson). Some critics praised the chemistry between Reynolds and Jackson, though Rotten Tomatoes' consensus agreed that some felt the film had a clichéd plot and execution. Filming for a sequel to Deadpool started in June 2017 and led to the release of Deadpool 2 in 2018. The film became a commercial success, grossing $715 million and becoming the ninth-highest-grossing film of 2018.

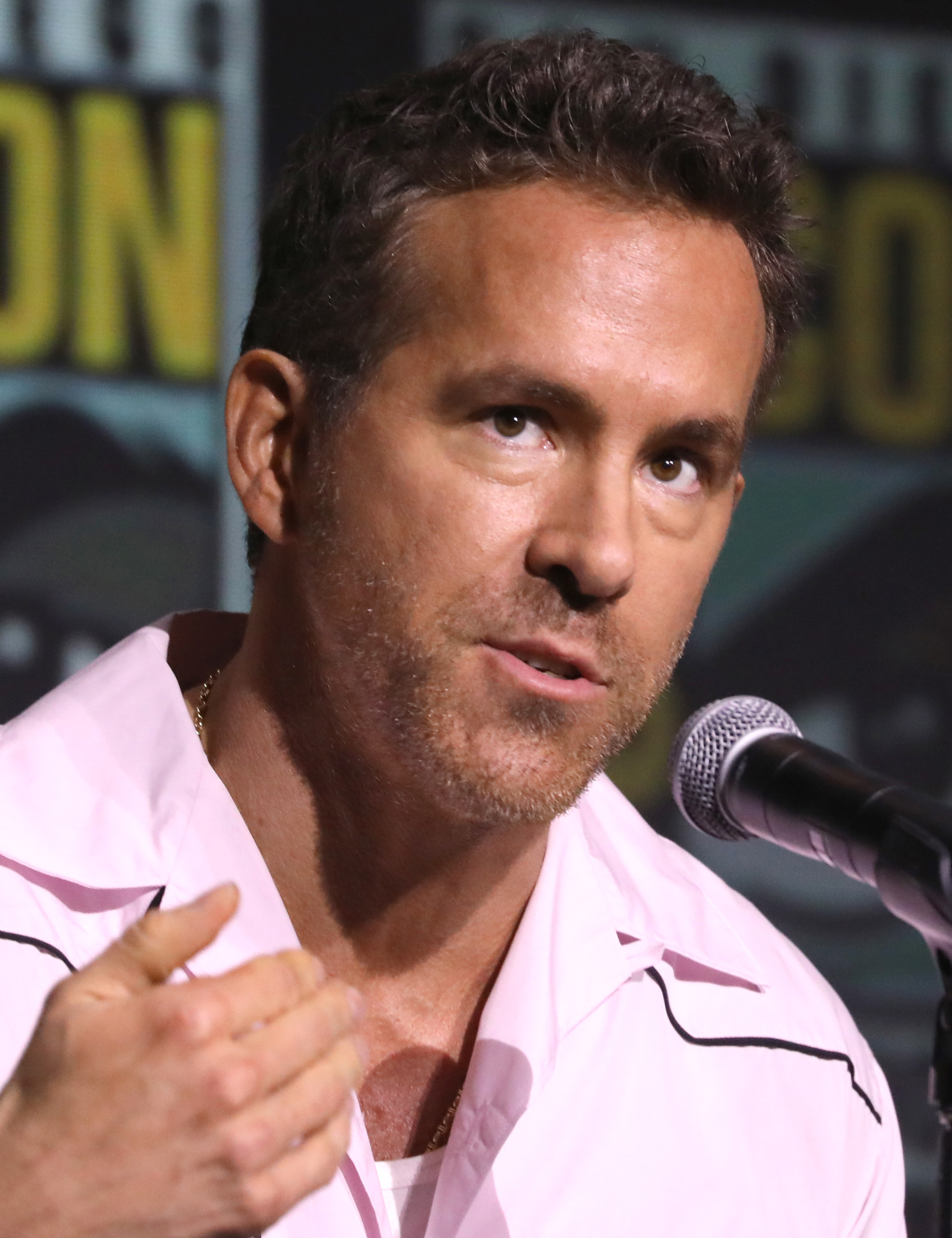
Reynolds at the 2024 San Diego Comic-Con International

Reynolds voiced the titular character in Rob Letterman's fantasy film Detective Pikachu (2019), an adaptation of the video game of the same name. He played a detective and intelligent talking Pikachu that only Tim (Justice Smith) can understand. The film received positive reviews from critics; Steve Rose from The Guardian praised Reynolds for "grab[bing] the film by the scruff of the neck". He next starred in Michael Bay's action film 6 Underground (2019) as the leader of a group of six people from different parts of the world who unite to fight an evil dictator after being presumed dead. He reprised his role as the voice of Guy in The Croods: A New Age (2020). Reynolds also reprised the role of Michael Bryce in the action film Hitman's Wife's Bodyguard (2020), a sequel to The Hitman's Bodyguard (2017). His next role was starring in Shawn Levy's contemporary fantasy Free Guy (2021), portraying a non-playable character who later realizes he is living in a video game and tries to prevent the creators from shutting it down. He starred as a renowned art thief in the action comedy film Red Notice (2021) alongside Dwayne Johnson and Gal Gadot.

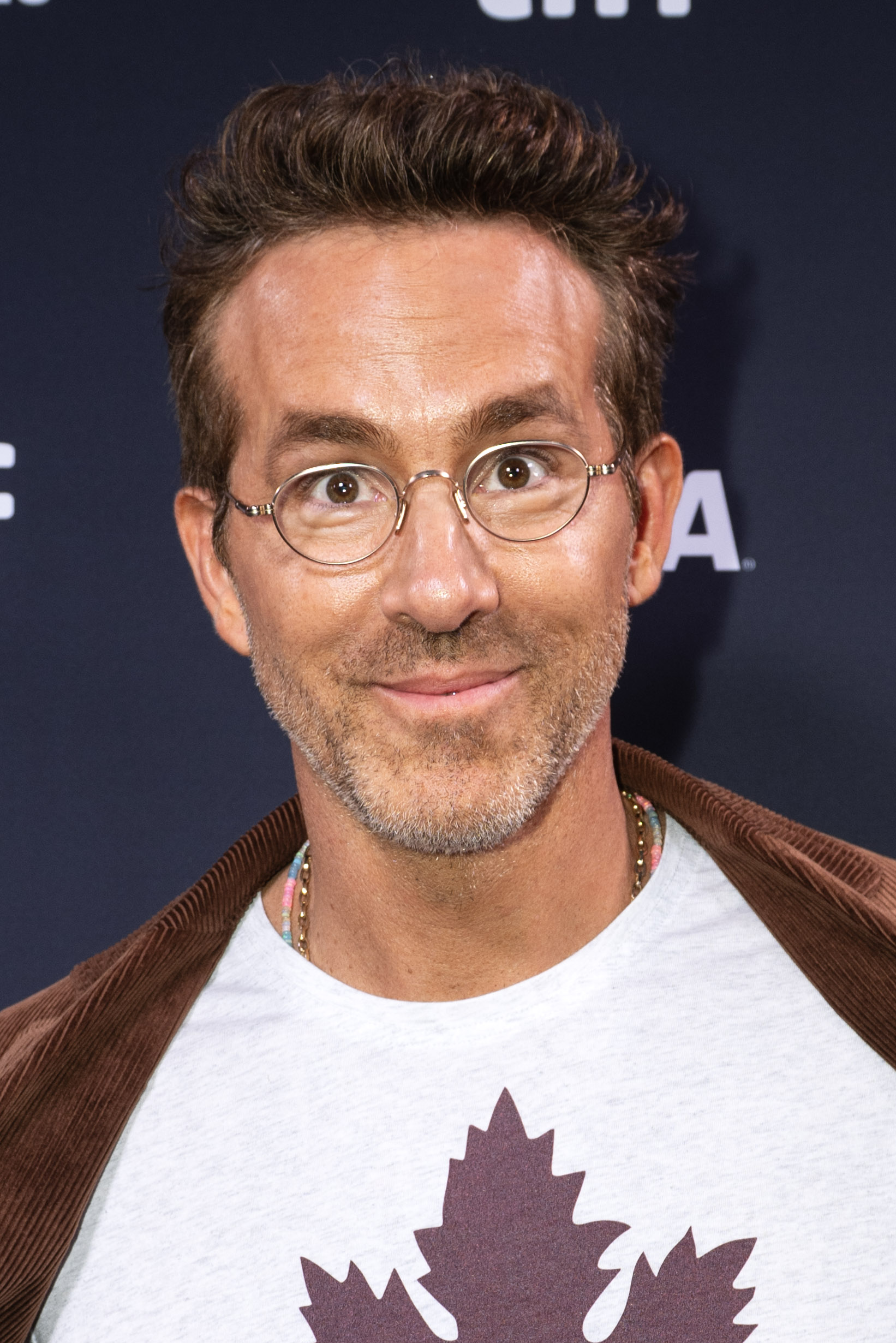
Reynolds at the 2025 Toronto International Film Festival

Reynolds next starred in Levy's science fiction action comedy The Adam Project (2022), portraying Adam Reed—a time pilot from 2050 who risks his life to uncover the truth regarding his wife's disappearance. The film received generally mixed reception; Ryan Leston from IGN liked Reynolds's performance, while NPR's Glen Weldon called him "funny in the way he usually is" but was as "handsome and buff and charismatic as ever". In October 2021, Reynolds announced he was taking "a little sabbatical" from his work after the production of Spirited (2022), a Christmas musical comedy. In August 2024, Reynolds and his wife, Blake Lively, became the first married Hollywood couple since Bruce Willis and Demi Moore in 1990 to have separate films leading the box office on the same weekend. Their respective films, Deadpool & Wolverine and It Ends with Us—in which they played the leading roles—claimed the number one and two spots during the August 9–11 weekend. Deadpool & Wolverine—also directed by Levy—achieved both commercial and critical success, grossing $1.338 billion worldwide. It became the second-highest-grossing film of 2024 and 20th highest-grossing film of all time at its release.

== Business career ==
In January 2018, Reynolds expanded into business ventures by launching the production company Maximum Effort and signing a three-year first-look deal with Fox. That same year, it was announced that a live-action adaptation of the board game Clue, written by Deadpool screenwriters Reese and Wernick, was in development. On June 23, 2021, Maximum Effort's marketing division was spun off into a separate company and acquired by MNTN Software. Reynolds has used Maximum Effort to create advertisements for his film projects and brands like Peloton and R. M. Williams.

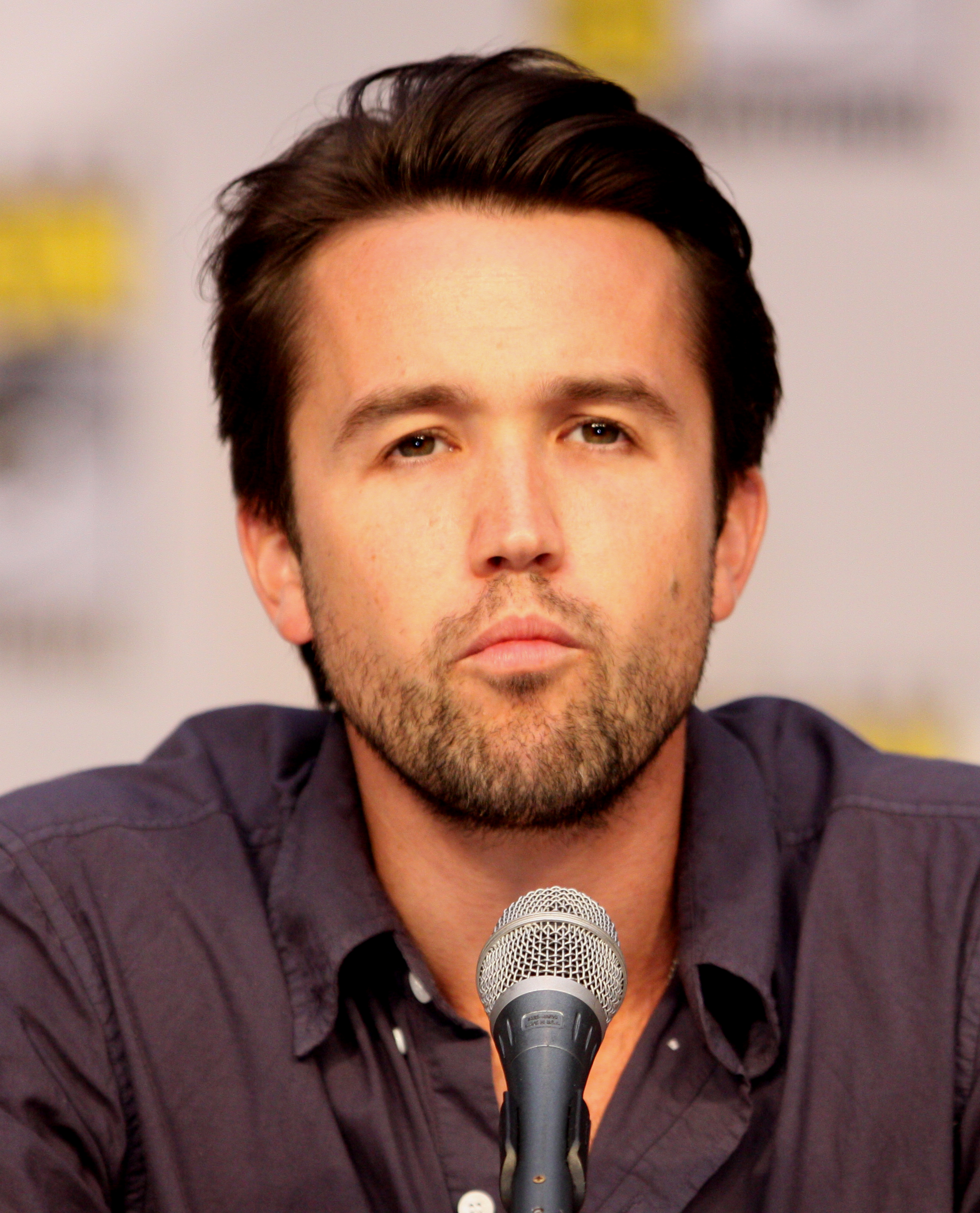
Reynolds owns football club Wrexham with fellow actor Rob McElhenney (pictured in 2010).

In February 2018, Reynolds acquired a stake in Aviation American Gin, overseeing the brand's creative direction. He later purchased an ownership stake in Mint Mobile in November 2019, holding between 20% and 25%. David Glickman—founder of Mint—and Reynolds both served on the board of directors for the Michael J. Fox Foundation, and Glickman was impressed by Reynolds's marketing efforts for Deadpool. In 2020, Reynolds joined the board of Match Group and later sold Aviation American Gin to Diageo in a deal valued at up to $610 million.

In September 2020, the Wrexham Supporters Trust announced that a business partnership comprising Reynolds and fellow actor Rob McElhenney was in talks to purchase the Welsh football club Wrexham. Their takeover was confirmed in November 2020, receiving approval from the Financial Conduct Authority in February 2021. The two embraced Welsh culture, promoting its language in their media projects and receiving the Diolch Y Ddraig award from Welsh broadcaster S4C. Reynolds asked that Welsh subtitles be included with his Netflix movie Red Notice (2021), which was also advertised within Wrexham. The process of Reynolds and McElhenney's investment in Wrexham was covered in the television documentary series Welcome to Wrexham (2022–present).

Reynolds has also invested in several companies, including Wealthsimple, 1Password and FuboTV. In 2022, he briefly pursued ownership of the National Hockey League's Ottawa Senators but withdrew his bid in the middle of 2023. He later became part of an investor group that acquired a 24% stake in the Alpine F1 Team. In March 2023, T-Mobile announced its acquisition of Mint Mobile in a deal worth up to $1.35 billion. In April 2023, Canadian payments technology company Nuvei announced that Reynolds had invested in the company.

== Philanthropy and activism ==
In May 2020, Reynolds joined a group of celebrities in reading an installment of Roald Dahl's James and the Giant Peach (1961) to support the global non-profit organization Partners In Health, co-founded by Dahl's daughter Ophelia, in its efforts to combat COVID-19 in vulnerable areas. In July 2020, Reynolds and broadcaster George Stroumboulopoulos each offered $5,000 for the return of a stolen teddy bear belonging to a Vancouver woman. The Build-A-Bear, which contained a recording of the woman's deceased mother saying "I love you" in Filipino, was recovered within a few days by two individuals. Reynolds expressed his support for same-sex marriage in an interview and has advocated for increased representation of LGBTQ+ characters in film.

Reynolds is also an environmental activist. He supports the Michael J. Fox Foundation, which he joined to help find a cure for Parkinson's disease. His father, James Reynolds, died in 2015 after having the disease for 20 years. In 2008, Reynolds ran the New York City Marathon for Team Fox. He joined the foundation's board in 2009 and continues to support research for a cure. In March 2022, Reynolds and Lively donated $500,000 to Water First, an organization providing Indigenous communities in Canada with access to clean water and training for young people to become environmental technicians. Reynolds was honored with the Academy of Canadian Cinema and Television's Humanitarian Award at the 11th Canadian Screen Awards in October 2022. The couple later donated $1 million to the non-profit organization Feeding America to aid relief efforts in Florida and other U.S. regions affected by the October 2024 hurricanes Helene and Milton.

Following the 2022 Russian invasion of Ukraine, Reynolds and Lively pledged to match donations of up to $1 million for Ukrainian refugees fleeing the conflict. In August 2023, Lively and Reynolds joined several other Hollywood couples in donating $1 million to the SAG-AFTRA Foundation's financial assistance program, supporting actors facing financial hardship. In October 2023, the couple donated $1 million to the International Committee of the Red Cross to support children affected by the conflict between Israel and Gaza. They became the first celebrities to publicly contribute financial aid to both sides amid the Israel–Hamas war.

== Acting style and public image ==
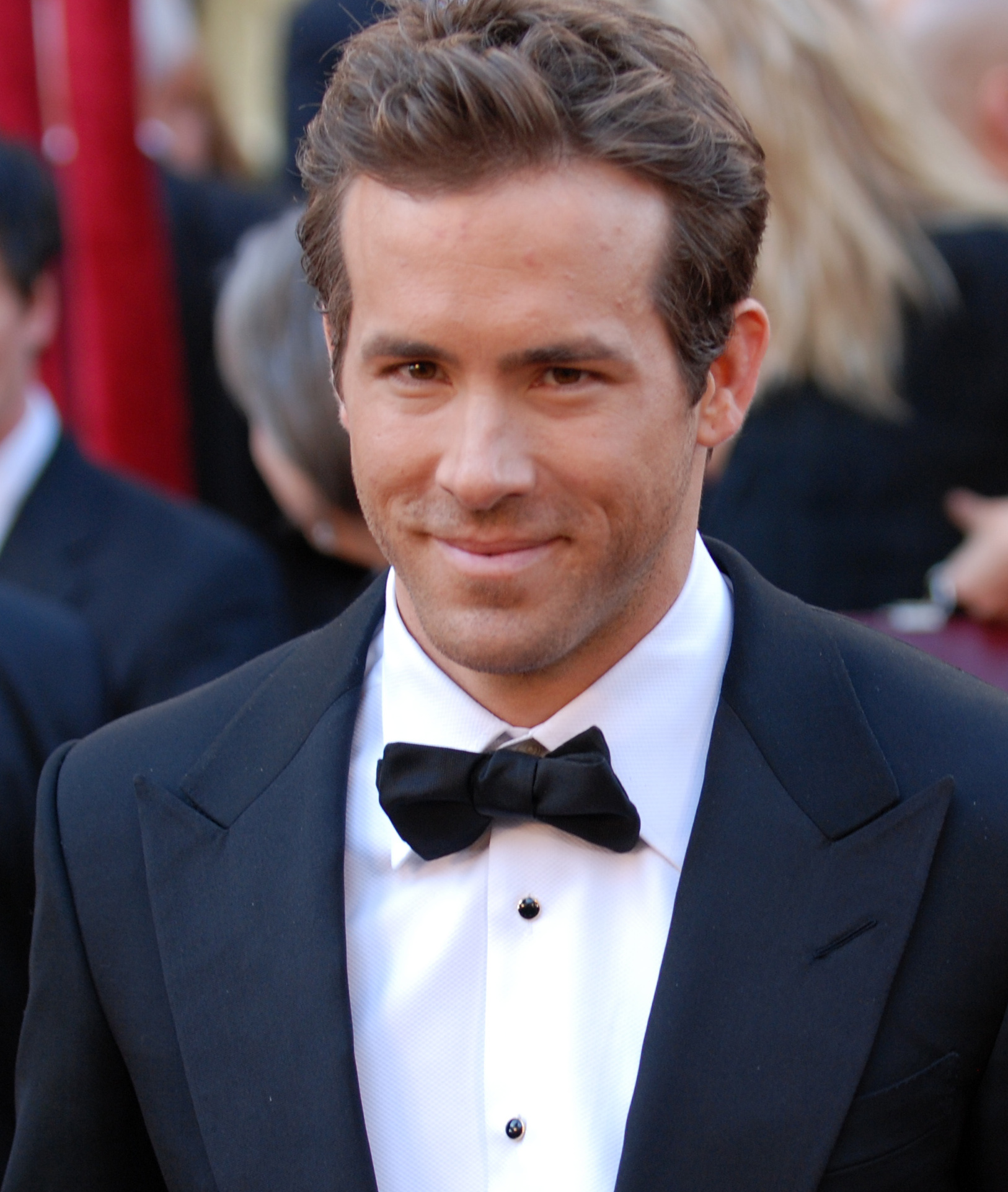
Reynolds at the 82nd Academy Awards in 2010

In 2014, The Hollywood Reporter's Richard Newby called Reynolds "one of Hollywood's most popular actors for nearly 20 years". He is known for his large and diverse range of roles throughout his career, though he usually acts in comedy, action and superhero films; throughout the late 2000s, he generally had roles in low-budget romantic comedy films. Ali Shutler from NME described Reynolds as crude and sarcastic, stating that he is "extremely versatile [but] isn't afraid of taking risks". The Guardian called him a "romcom lead, sitcom star, indie champion [... who] can turn his hand to almost any role". Variety's Jenelle Riley commented on his several "bold, risky choices in films that might have slipped under the radar".

CNBC noted that despite frequently portraying snarky and sarcastic characters on screen, Reynolds has built a reputation as one of the nicest actors in Hollywood. Reynolds has stated that "self-deprecating humor to me has always been something that helped", and several critics have highlighted his frequent use of it in his public persona. He has referred to his storytelling skills as a "quirky element" of his public image, calling it "the bedrock foundation" of his success in various industries. Chris Thilk of Adweek described Reynolds's public persona as "dry, egotistical, quick-witted, and slightly oblivious", commenting that he has effectively leveraged it to promote numerous projects.

In 2017, Reynolds was named in Time magazine's Time 100, a compilation of the 100 most influential people in the world. In 2020, he appeared in the Celebrity 100 list, a compilation of the 100 most powerful public figures in the world, as selected annually by Forbes. He was listed as the eighteenth-most-powerful person in the world. That same year, the magazine also listed him as the second-highest-paid actor in the world, with earnings of $71.5 million. He was again listed by Forbes as the second-highest-paid actor in the world in 2024, with earnings of $85 million. Reynolds was featured in People's Sexiest Men Alive lists in 2007 and 2009 before being named Sexiest Man Alive in 2010. In 2024, he was included on Harper's Bazaar's list of the 50 Hottest Men of All Time. As of September 2025, Reynolds's films have grossed over $6.6 billion worldwide according to The Numbers.

Several critics have noted Reynolds for his simple sense of style. GQ thought that his "go-tos are straightforward, almost to the point where they resist description: nondescript tees, uncomplicated jackets, closely tailored trousers, and cool but not hype-y sneakers". Christine Flammia from Esquire appreciated his "accessible" style and called him the "king of outfit repeating". Reynolds often "keeps things simple" according to British GQ and usually wears "three-piece suits and black velvet tuxes à la nuit and earthy-hued bomber jackets au jour".

Blake Lively, Reynolds' wife, was an actor and producer in the 2024 film It Ends with Us. After Lively filed a complaint with the California Civil Rights Department and a subsequent lawsuit alleging that director Justin Baldoni created a hostile workplace, Baldoni filed a $400 million countersuit against Reynolds and Lively, alleging extortion, defamation, and invasion of privacy.

In March 2025, Reynolds filed a motion to be dismissed from Baldoni's lawsuit, claiming to have no involvement in the matter outside of supporting Lively. Baldoni's lawsuit was dismissed in June 2025.

== Personal life ==
Reynolds began dating singer Alanis Morissette in 2002 after meeting her at Drew Barrymore's birthday party, and the couple announced their engagement in 2004. In February 2007, their representatives confirmed they had mutually decided to call their engagement off. Morissette later revealed that her seventh studio album Flavors of Entanglement (2008) was inspired by the heartbreak of their break-up, with the song "Torch" specifically written about Reynolds. Shortly after his breakup with Morissette, Reynolds began dating actress Scarlett Johansson in April 2007. The couple announced their engagement in May 2008 and married in September of that year in a private ceremony in Vancouver Island. On December 14, 2010, they announced their separation. They filed for divorce in Los Angeles on December 23. Their divorce was finalized in July 2011.

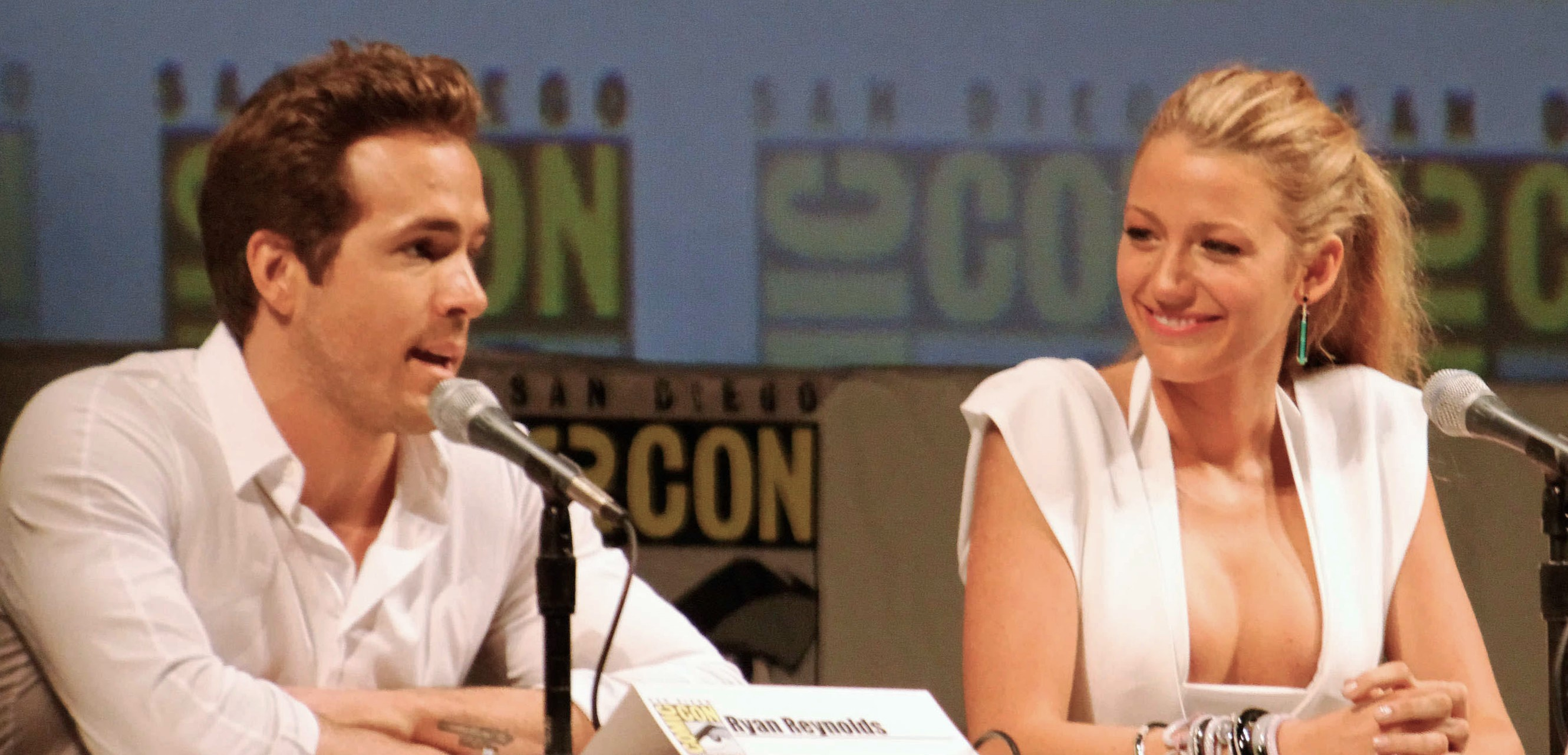
Reynolds with Lively promoting Green Lantern in 2010

Reynolds first met Blake Lively in July 2010 while filming Green Lantern (2011), in which they costarred. They began dating in October 2011 and married on September 9, 2012, at Boone Hall Plantation in Mount Pleasant, South Carolina. Following civil rights protests in 2020, Reynolds and Lively publicly apologized and expressed deep regret for choosing the venue and made a $200,000 donation to the NAACP legal defense fund. They have four children together—three daughters and a son. The family lives in Pound Ridge, New York. Reynolds and Lively are close friends with singer-songwriter Taylor Swift, who named the characters in her 2020 song "Betty" after their daughters. In November 2024, Reynolds confirmed that Swift is the godmother to his three daughters.

Reynolds is also close friends with Hugh Jackman, whom he credits for introducing him to Levy, the director of three of his films.

Reynolds' father, James, died in 2015 following a twenty-year battle with Parkinson's disease. Reynolds said that he used humor as a way to process his grief, stating that he and his siblings were making their father laugh during his final moments. He also said that portraying Deadpool contributed to his process of grieving, and that becoming a parent has helped reconcile his complex relationship with his deceased father. Reynolds has openly discussed his lifelong struggle with anxiety, revealing in 2018 that he often conducted interviews in character as Deadpool to help manage his fears. In 2024, he reiterated that his anxiety makes him "quiet" and "shy" outside of acting. He attained American citizenship c. 2018, and voted for the first time in the 2020 presidential election.

== Acting credits and accolades ==
According to review aggregation website Rotten Tomatoes, Reynolds's most acclaimed films include Harold & Kumar Go to White Castle (2004), Adventureland (2009), Buried (2010), The Whale (2011), Mississippi Grind (2015), Deadpool (2016), Deadpool 2 (2018), The Croods: A New Age (2020), Free Guy (2021), Deadpool & Wolverine (2024) and The Adam Project (2022)

His work has made him the recipient of numerous accolades, including two Primetime Emmy Awards for Outstanding Unstructured Reality Program for executive-producing the series Welcome to Wrexham. He received a Golden Globe nomination for Best Actor in a Motion Picture – Musical or Comedy for his role in Deadpool (2016). For the soundtrack of Deadpool 2 (2018), he received a Grammy nomination for Best Compilation Soundtrack for Visual Media. He was later nominated again for the soundtrack of Deadpool & Wolverine (2024). His other accolades include three MTV Movie & TV Awards, three People's Choice Awards and a Saturn Award.

On December 15, 2016, Reynolds received a star on the Hollywood Walk of Fame at 6801 Hollywood Boulevard. Mary Simon, governor general of Canada, honored Reynolds with a Governor General Performing Arts Award on November 26, 2021. In August 2023, Reynolds was announced as a recipient of the Order of British Columbia, British Columbia's highest honor. He and his fellow honorees were scheduled to receive the award at a ceremony in Victoria in November 2023. On December 19, 2024, Reynolds was appointed an Officer of the Order of Canada, recognizing both his achievements in film and his philanthropic contributions.

== Bibliography ==
- Morgan, Chris (2021). The Nickelodeon '90s: Cartoons, Game shows and a Whole Bunch of Slime. McFarland & Company. ISBN 978-1-4766-8564-9.
- Ndounou, Monica White (2014). Shaping the Future of African American Film: Color-Coded Economics and the Story Behind the Numbers. Rutgers University Press. ISBN 978-0-8135-6257-5.
- Stephens, John C. (2024). Altered States of Consciousness in the Movies. McFarland & Company. ISBN 978-1-4766-5433-1.
- Terrace, Vincent (2014). Encyclopedia of Television Shows, 1925 Through 2010 (2 ed.). McFarland & Company. ISBN 978-0-7864-8641-0.
