= I Get That a Lot =

American television series

I Get That a Lot is a reality television series that aired on CBS. Celebrities are placed in everyday working class jobs while hidden cameras are used to capture the reactions of unsuspecting customers and passersby. When the celebrities are recognized, they deny their real identities and say "I get that a lot," until the end of the segment, at which time the cameras are revealed and they come forward about their identities.

The first two episodes also aired internationally in Australia on Channel Ten. There is also a French version based on the format, named Sosie ! Or Not Sosie ?, produced by Carson Prod and aired on French TV leader TF1. There is also an Arabic version based on the format, named مشبه عليك, produced by Sugar Rush Productions and aired on Arabic TV leader Abu Dhabi TV.

== Episode one ==
This program first aired on April 1, 2009. Participants include model Heidi Klum working at a pizza parlor, rapper and actor Ice-T selling shoes, Survivor host Jeff Probst working a cash register, country music star LeAnn Rimes waiting tables, singer and actress Jessica Simpson working as a computer technician, Extra host Mario Lopez selling from a hot dog stand in Central Park and Subway spokesman Jared Fogle working at a Subway restaurant.

== Episode two ==
The second episode aired on CBS January 6, 2010 at 8:00 pm. Participants include Kiss vocalist and bassist Gene Simmons working as a psychic guru, socialite Paris Hilton working as a gas station attendant, Big Brother and The Early Show host Julie Chen working at a yogurt shop, skater Tony Hawk working at a surf shop, hip-hop artist Snoop Dogg taking on the role of a parking lot attendant and television cook and talk show host Rachael Ray working at a dry cleaner.

== Episode three ==
The third episode aired on CBS May 19, 2010 at 8:00 pm. Participants include current Let's Make a Deal host Wayne Brady working the front desk at a hotel, Tim Gunn taking orders at a fast food restaurant, Nick Jonas working at Forever 21, Wynonna Judd selling tires, Jay Mohr as a coffee house employee and Martha Stewart as a craft store employee. Sherman Hemsley made an appearance in Brady's segment as the individual pranked by Brady.

== Episode four ==
The fourth episode aired on CBS January 4, 2012 at 8:00 pm, starring NCIS's Pauley Perrette (in her Abby Sciuto attire) as a dog groomer, Ty Pennington of Extreme Makeover: Home Edition as a hardware store clerk, Olympic medalist Apolo Ohno as a produce worker, talk personality Dr. Drew as a LensCrafters employee, Jerry Springer as a sandwich maker and Pamela Anderson as a Victoria's Secret saleswoman.

== Episode five ==
The fifth episode aired on CBS January 9, 2013 at 8:00 pm, starring The Amazing Race host Phil Keoghan working at a sporting goods store, Olympian and Kardashian Caitlyn Jenner (featured pre-transition as Bruce Jenner) selling shoes in a high-end boutique, actress Jane Seymour working as an inept home goods store greeter, actor and comedian Cheech Marin behind the counter of a party supply store, racing superstar Jeff Gordon selling automotive supplies and Larry Hagman offering food samples at a membership warehouse shopping club.

== Episode six ==
The sixth episode aired on CBS December 30, 2015 at 8:00 p.m, starring British singer and actress Rita Ora working a tanning salon, Food Network's Guy Fieri working at car dealership, actress and singer Kristin Chenoweth working as a waitress, pop star Cody Simpson working at a candy store, Jeopardy! host Alex Trebek working at a public library, and Green Bay Packers' Aaron Rodgers working at a gym.
