= Finder's Fee =

2001 film by Jeff Probst

- DVD cover
- Directed by: Jeff Probst
- Written by: Jeff Probst
- Story by: Jim Gulian
- Produced by: Brad Van Arragon; Katy Wallin; Shawn Williamson
- Starring: Erik Palladino; James Earl Jones; Ryan Reynolds; Dash Mihok; Matthew Lillard; Robert Forster
- Cinematography: Francis Kenny
- Edited by: Brian Berdan
- Music by: Rob King; B. C. Smith
- Distributed by: Lions Gate Entertainment; Silverline Pictures
- Release dates: June 16, 2001 (Seattle); October 28, 2003 (United States)
- Running time: 100 minutes
- Country: United States
- Language: English

Finder's Fee is a 2001 American drama thriller film directed by Jeff Probst from his original screenplay.

== Plot ==
Heading home one evening, Tepper finds a wallet. He notifies its owner by calling a number he finds inside, then discovers it contains this week's $6 million lottery winning ticket.

Shortly after his friends Quigley, Bolan and Fishman arrive for their weekly poker night. One condition of the game is that everyone purchases a lottery ticket for the pot. They play as a freezeout, winner takes all.

Fishman arrives first, talking non-stop, paranoid about everything. Bolan is next, an overtly positive married man. Then comes Quigley, a divorced wine salesman whose ex recently moved to Florida with their child. Tepper tells them he will propose to his girlfriend Carla that evening, so they must hustle.

When the apparent owner of the wallet, Avery Phillips, arrives, Tepper faces a moral dilemma about the winning ticket, initially opting to pocket it. The older man enters to call his wife. Avery cannot reach her, so stays to play darts, which is actually part of the group's ritual before playing cards. Tepper attempts to get him to leave, but then NYPD officers lock down the apartment building for an investigation.

The overbearing Fishman insists Avery play. When Bolan recognizes him, he says he is a bus driver. When Avery calls home again, the wary Tepper watches him closely as he is snooping around. When he admires Tepper's valuable baseball card of a player his young granddaughter loves, the younger man gifts it to her.

When the police arrive, Avery nervously heads to the restroom. When the officer enters, Tepper signals to the bathroom. Calling for Raymond, he instead finds Avery hiding inside. Bringing him out, his name is run through dispatch.

Avery Phillips is wanted for two outstanding parking tickets incurred in the Bronx. He also says he is a retired firefighter. The officer concurs that they have become warrants. Avery insists he has not paid them because he is contesting them.

When Bolen sees Avery's bum leg, he recognizes his name from the camp where he works, someone who used to teach fire safety to the kids. Avery explains he got the bus driving job because disability checks do not fully cover his family's expenses.

The group of friends initially play the game without throwing in their lottery tickets. However, when they do, Tepper claims he does not have one. Avery insists it is in his shirt pocket, as he has been watching him. Tempers flare, but the older suggests everyone back down so as not to forever ruin their friendships.

As they play, they make the rule that whoever leaves the table is out. Quigley gets tricked into standing up, then Bolan folds to peep on undressing neighbors. Tepper secretly cuts his finger to be excused to the bathroom, leading to an argument. Bolen gets them to let him arbitrate, so Tepper is free to get up.

Tepper, who has a duplicate deck of cards, arranges a good hand for himself in the bathroom. Quigley soon enters to pee. At the table, Tepper almost gets busted because one of his cards is a duplicate of one of Avery's, but he hides the suit. Down to him and Avery, he gets a straight, but ill gotten as he realises one of the cards was snuck in as it has a shoe print. Tepper calls in for the numbers, saying there is no win, but Quigley calls his bluff.

It is revealed that both Quigley and Tepper knew the winning numbers beforehand, Quigley flips out, breaking a chair over Avery's head. He suggests everyone in the old man's neighborhood knows he plays his granddaughter's birthday, as he has every week for 10 years. Carla calls Tepper on the intercom. As he does not pick up, she monologues that she initiated everything, is tired and leaves.

A 911 call for Avery's head injury gets the same officer as before. They all try to assuage him, but Tepper explains they have Avery's winning lottery ticket, which he gives to the officer for safe-keeping.

Everyone but Avery leaves, so Tepper reveals he kept the ticket for him. After he goes, Tepper calls Carla and leaves a message, hoping he is not too late. Then, the real Avery appears.

== Cast ==
- Ryan Reynolds as Quigley
- Erik Palladino as Tepper
- Matthew Lillard as Fishman
- Dash Mihok as Bolan
- James Earl Jones as Avery Phillips
- Carly Pope as Carla
- Frances Bay as Mrs. Darmsetter
- Robert Forster as Officer Campbell

== Reception ==
The film holds a 60% approval rating on Rotten Tomatoes based on reviews from 5 critics.

== Awards ==
Finder's Fee won the Golden Space Needle Award, given to the audience's choice for Best Picture at the 2001 Seattle International Film Festival.

Jeff Probst won the award for Best Screenplay (Feature Film) at the 2001 Method Fest Independent Film Festival.

James Earl Jones won the award for Best Actor in a DVD Premiere Movie at the 2003 DVDX Awards.
