= Jeff Probst =

American television host (born 1961)

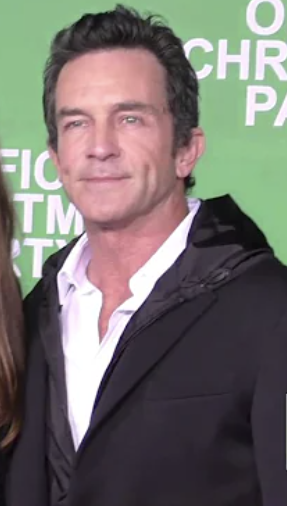
- Probst in 2016
- Born: 1961 (age 64–65); Wichita, Kansas, U.S.
- Occupations: Television presenter; television producer; author
- Years active: 1996–present
- Spouses: Shelley Wright (m. 1996; div. 2001); Lisa Ann Russell (m. 2011)

Jeff Probst (/proʊbst/; born 1961) is an American television presenter, producer, actor and young adult fiction writer. He is best known as the host of the American version of the reality television show Survivor since 2000 and The Jeff Probst Show, a syndicated daytime talk show produced by CBS Television Distribution from September 2012 to May 2013.

== Early life ==
Probst was born at Wesley Medical Center in Wichita, Kansas, the oldest of three sons to Jerry and Barbara Probst. His family moved to Bellevue, Washington, when Probst was 15 years old. After graduating from Newport High School in 1979, Probst attended Seattle Pacific University, but left before graduating to pursue a career in television. Soon after leaving college, he began working at Boeing Motion Picture/Television studio as a producer and later narrator of marketing and training videos.

== Career ==
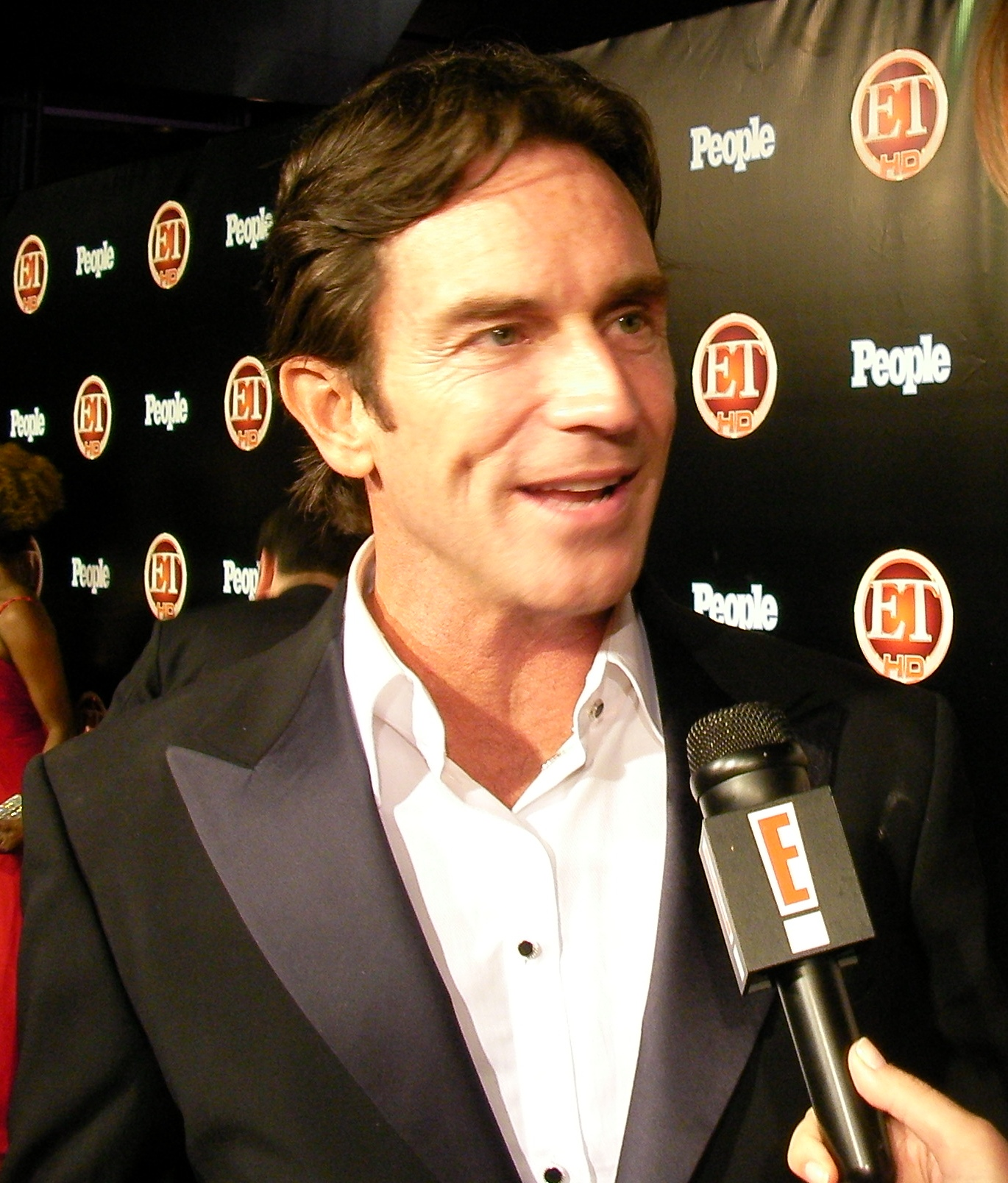
Probst in 2008

In addition to Survivor, Probst once hosted FX's original half-hour show dedicated to answering viewer letters, Backchat, along with Sound FX, a music series featuring Orlando Jones (1996). Probst also hosted the VH1 series Rock & Roll Jeopardy! from 1998 to 2001 and was a correspondent for the syndicated program Access Hollywood. He also wrote and directed the Lionsgate released film, Finder's Fee. People magazine named Probst one of the "50 Most Beautiful People" in 2001. He often contributes to Jeopardy! by giving Survivor-related clues from the show's venues, has twice appeared on Celebrity Jeopardy!, first in 2001 and again in 2003, and made several cameo appearances during the April 1, 2010, episode. He was a frequent guest star on the sketch show Mad TV, guest-starring once a season since the show's 9th season. He hosted "Celebrity Superfan Roundtable" for Howard Stern.

Probst is the host of Survivor, a globally syndicated American reality show which he has hosted since its inception in 2000. He has stated that he had worked hard to get a meeting with series creator Mark Burnett as he believed the show was "something special." Probst caught Burnett's eye in 1999 when he interviewed Sandra Bullock while working for Access Hollywood. Burnett was impressed by Probst's ability to garner honest answers from media trained celebrities and felt that his relative anonymity would allow the show to be built "from the ground up." Probst has won four Primetime Emmy Awards as the host of Survivor. He delivers the series' signature catchphrase to losing contestants, "The tribe has spoken. It's time for you to go," which was included in TV Land's "The 100 Greatest TV Quotes and Catch Phrases" special in 2006.

On October 20, 2008, TV Guide reported that Probst was developing a new reality TV series for CBS called Live for the Moment that was to feature people with terminal illnesses being taken on "the last adventure of their life" before they die. Only the pilot was aired, on January 28, 2010.

On April 1, 2009, Probst appeared on the CBS reality television special I Get That a Lot, in which he worked a cash register.

In October 2011, he appeared as himself on the sitcom How I Met Your Mother, in the episode "The Stinson Missile Crisis".

In January 2012, Probst was announced as director of his second feature film, coming-of-age story Kiss Me, starring John Corbett and Sarah Bolger, with production scheduled to begin in Los Angeles the following month.

Probst hosted The Jeff Probst Show, a syndicated daytime talk show produced by CBS Television Distribution from September 2012 to May 2013. CBS did not pick up the show for a second season, citing low ratings. Between October 2012 and January 2014, Probst hosted the recurring Adult Swim special, "The Greatest Event in Television History," which consisted of remakes of 1980s TV show title sequences.

In February 2013, Probst teamed up with Christopher Tebbetts to release the first of Scholastic's adventure series Stranded, aimed at middle school students, grades 4–6. It follows the story of Vanessa, Buzz, Carter, and Jane as they are left on a deserted island and forced to fend for themselves. It started out as a regular vacation, but when a storm sets in, the kids are shipwrecked in the middle of the South Pacific without any parents. They must find a way to work together if they are ever to get off the island. Stranded is the first of the three-book series.

In November 2013 and January 2014, Probst appeared as himself on the sitcom Two and a Half Men in two season 11 episodes, "Some Kind of Lesbian Zombie" and "Baseball. Boobs. Boobs. Baseball".

In December 2016, Probst appeared as himself on the sitcom Life in Pieces, in the episode "Swim Survivor Zen Talk".

Leading up to the launch of Paramount+, Probst himself would appear in his Survivor attire in the Paramount Expedition ad campaign alongside many of Paramount's owned IPs in the fictional Paramount Mountain.

In October 2022, Probst appeared on Saturday Night Live in the season 48 episode hosted by Jack Harlow. He appeared in the "Joker Wedding" sketch.

In January 2026, Probst appeared as a guest on season 2 of Beast Games's fourth episode, a Survivor themed episode in which the 25 remaining contestants of the show competed to win a private island. Probst is the second ever guest to appear on the show, with Lil Yachty being the first one.

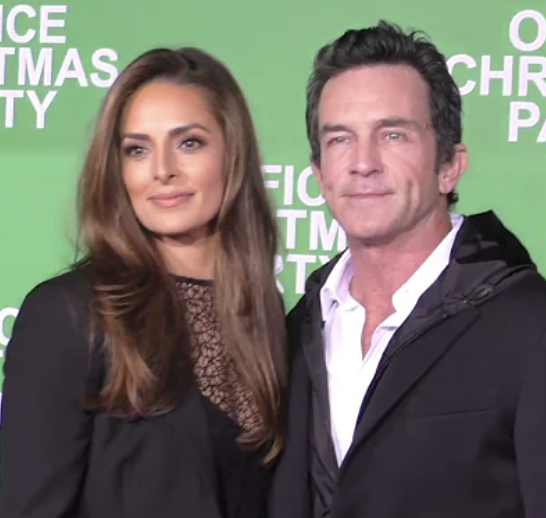
Probst with his wife Lisa Ann Russell

== Personal life ==
Probst was married to his first wife, psychotherapist Shelley Wright, from 1996 to 2001. In 2004, after filming on Survivor: Vanuatu wrapped, he began dating one of the contestants, Julie Berry. They broke up in early 2008.

Probst married his second wife, Lisa Ann Russell, on December 5, 2011. Through this marriage, Probst is a stepfather to Russell's two children.

Probst keeps the snuffer that he uses to snuff the torches when a contestant is voted out of the game as a souvenir after every season of Survivor. He has written a book called Stranded, based on the show Survivor. As an ordained minister, he has presided over the weddings of several of his friends.

== Accolades ==
On September 21, 2008, Probst won the first Primetime Emmy Award for Outstanding Host for a Reality or Reality Competition Program. He won the same award in 2009, 2010, and 2011. The Los Angeles Times attributed Probst's track record in the category to his penchant for interacting with contestants on a compassionate personal level unseen in any of his competitors, transcending his role of host to that of counselor.

Award	Year	Category	Nominated work	Result	Ref.
Primetime Emmy Awards	2001	Oustanding Non-Fiction Program (Special Class)	Survivor	Won	
Primetime Emmy Awards	2002	Oustanding Special Class Program	Survivor	Nominated	
Primetime Emmy Awards	2003	Outstanding Reality Competition Program	Survivor	Nominated	
Primetime Emmy Awards	2004	Outstanding Reality Competition Program	Survivor	Nominated	
Primetime Emmy Awards	2005	Outstanding Reality Competition Program	Survivor	Nominated	
Primetime Emmy Awards	2006	Outstanding Reality Competition Program	Survivor	Nominated	
Primetime Emmy Awards	2008	Outstanding Host for a Reality or Reality Competition Program	Survivor	Won	
Primetime Emmy Awards	2009	Outstanding Host for a Reality or Reality Competition Program	Survivor	Won	
Primetime Emmy Awards	2010	Outstanding Host for a Reality or Reality Competition Program	Survivor	Won	
Primetime Emmy Awards	2011	Outstanding Host for a Reality or Reality Competition Program	Survivor	Won	
Primetime Emmy Awards	2023	Outstanding Reality Competition Program	Survivor	Nominated	
Primetime Emmy Awards	2024	Outstanding Host for a Reality or Reality Competition Program	Survivor	Nominated	
Primetime Emmy Awards	2025	Outstanding Reality Competition Program	Survivor	Nominated	
Primetime Emmy Awards	2025	Outstanding Host for a Reality or Reality Competition Program	Survivor	Nominated	
Primetime Emmy Awards	2026	Outstanding Host for a Reality or Reality Competition Program	Survivor	Nominated	

== Filmography ==
=== Television ===
Television
Year	Title	Role	Notes
1999–2001	Rock & Roll Jeopardy!	Host	
2000–present	Survivor	Executive director, producer and host	
2001–2003	Celebrity Jeopardy!	Himself	Contestant; 2 episodes
2002–2004	Fillmore!	Raycliff	Main role; voice; 8 episodes
2003–2007	Mad TV	Guest star	5 episodes
2007	Wheel of Fortune People's Celebrity Week	Himself	Guest Appearance; 1 episode
2009	I Get That a Lot	Guest star	Episode: "Heidi Klum, Jeff Probst, Ice-T, LeAnn Rimes, Jessica Simpson, Mario Lopez, Jared Fogle"
2011	How I Met Your Mother	Himself	Episode: "The Stinson Missile Crisis"
2012–2013	The Jeff Probst Show	Host	
2013–2014	Two and a Half Men	Himself	2 episodes
2014	The (206)	Actor	Episode: "Reign Man"
2016	Life in Pieces	Himself	Episode: "Swim Survivor Zen Talk"
2017	Family Guy	Himself	Voice; episode: "Petey IV"
2022	Saturday Night Live	Himself	Episode: "Jack Harlow"
2026	Beast Games	Guest	Episode: "The Survivor Takeover"
2026	The Simpsons	Himself	Voice; episode: "Treehouse of Horror XXXVII"

=== Film ===
Film
Year	Title	Role	Notes
1994	Trust Me	Director, executive producer, writer, editor	Direct-to-video
2001	Finder's Fee	Director, writer	
2014	Kiss Me	Director, producer	
2026	Send Help	Himself	Archival audio only
