= Fifteen (TV series) =

Canadian-American teen drama television series

- Also known as: Hillside
- Genre: Teen drama; Comedy-drama
- Created by: John T. Binkley
- Written by: John T. Binkley; Judy Bryson; John Lazarus; Tom Smith; Joan Weir; Ian Weir
- Directed by: Michael Berry; John T. Binkley
- Composers: Benito Altobelli; Matt Ender; Ian Weir; Brian Wright
- Countries of origin: Canada; United States
- Original language: English
- No. of seasons: 4
- No. of episodes: 65

Production
- Executive producers: John T. Binkley; Brown Johnson; Sherrie Matthews; Don Smith; Sheldon S. Wiseman
- Producers: John T. Binkley; David Dewar; Marisa Doolan; Frank Taylor
- Editor: Jana Fritsch
- Running time: 25 minutes

Original release
- Network: YTV (Canada); Nickelodeon (USA)
- Release: February 3, 1991 – April 25, 1993

Fifteen (known as Hillside in Canada) is a teen drama television series that aired on YTV in Canada and on Nickelodeon from February 3, 1991 to April 25, 1993. Created and produced by John T. Binkley, the series was Nickelodeon's only teenage soap opera. The show was shot on videotape, similar to most daytime dramas.

The series was first conceived as Hillside in an improvised form for The Disney Channel, where a 13-episode pilot series was produced and tested in the United States. After Disney decided not to proceed with the project, Nickelodeon and Canadian partners joined Binkley in producing the series; which was known in its first and second seasons as Hillside in Canada, and throughout the 65-episode run as Fifteen in the United States.

The show was subsequently syndicated around the world, with runs in Germany and Israel, among others. Rerun rights are held by the Peter Rodgers Organization, which has made all four seasons available for free on Prime Video.

The series features a large ensemble cast that underwent several changes over the show's four-season run. Notable cast members include Laura Harris, Enuka Okuma, and Ryan Reynolds (Reynolds later admitted to disliking working on the show so much that he briefly considered quitting acting altogether).

== Plot ==
Fifteen followed the students of fictional Hillside School and dealt with a variety of issues including dating, divorce, alcohol abuse, infidelity and friendship. The show played heavily into stereotypes, including two characters named Dylan and Chris, who wore leather jackets to show off their toughness, but which could not completely disguise their inner selves. At one point, they play a gig with their band Teenagers in Love at the local eatery and hangout spot The Avalon.

== Cast and characters ==
- Laura Harris as Ashley Frasier – Ashley is a soft-spoken honor student who struggles to balance academic expectations with personal relationships. Though considered wholesome, she occasionally makes bad decisions to spite her image. She's the longtime on-again, off-again girlfriend of Matt Walker.
- Todd Talbot as Matt Walker – The captain and star player of the school's basketball team, Matt struggles with substance abuse throughout the series which harms his relationships and school reputation. He loves Ashley, but he and she continue to break up. They finally break up for good and he moves away.
- Ryan Reynolds as Billy Simpson – The younger brother of Courtney, Billy frequently hangs around Dylan and looks up to him. After facing family problems and personal betrayal (as well as numerous romantic rejections), Billy turns to bullying to mask his emotions. An intervention from Dylan finally gets through to Billy and he makes amends for his bullying streak.
- Chris William Martin as Dylan Blackwell – The mysterious rebel of the school, Dylan aspires to become a musician. He's often stuck managing conflict within his band, has a troubled relationship with his parents and later drops out of school. He had a fractious rivalry with Matt at first, but they became friends as the series went on. He and Ashley have feelings for each other and finally explore them.
- Robyn Ross as Brooke Morgan (seasons 1–3) – Brooke is the self-centered and mean-spirited antagonist who often inserts herself into other's business where it's not warranted. She is arrogant, spiteful, cruel, and manipulative, but her self-centered ways come back to haunt her on more than one occasion. She's at odds with her sisters, whom their father seems to favor more than her. Brooke eventually leaves in the third season and moves to France.
- Sarah Douglas as Courtney Simpson (seasons 1–3) – Courtney is the modest best friend of Ashley. She navigates a difficult relationship with her brother Billy during their parent's separation. She tends to be naive and meek at times.
- Ken Angel as Jake Deosdade (seasons 1 and 3) – Jake is a good friend to many students at Hillside but fancies Courtney in particular. He has feelings for Courtney and the two eventually start dating. Absent in China through season 2, Jake returns to Hillside for season 3. He is also Matt's best friend.
- Enuka Okuma as Kelly (season 1) – Brooke's equally cunning friend. Friction begins when Brooke has Kelly take the blame for a scheme against Ashley that they both conspired on. Kelly plots revenge on Brooke with the help of her sister, Theresa. Their friendship dissolves because of it. Kelly disappears without explanation after Season 1.
- Janine Cox as Theresa Morgan (season 1) – Brooke's little sister. Unlike Brooke, Theresa is kind-hearted and sensitive. She begins to lose respect for her sibling after seeing how she uses people for her own ends. She has a crush on Dylan. She aids Kelly in her revenge plot against Brooke. Theresa never appears again after Season 1, but unlike Kelly, who vanished and was never mentioned again, Theresa is said to be attending a prestigious art school in Season 2 by Brooke.
- Aubrey Nealon as Olaf (season 1) – A transfer student from Finland ostracized by most of the students. He often struggles to find the right word to describe his circumstances. He is a chess fanatic and friends with Billy.
- Ahnee Boyce as Cyndi (season 1) – An activist for environmental causes who is frustrated with the lack of concern from students. Strong-willed, assertive, but friendly, Cyndi wasn't afraid to speak her mind or put people like Brooke in their place when she had to.
- Roxanne Alexander as Roxanne Lee (seasons 2–4) – Roxanne is an associate of Chris who displays a tough exterior and is often the catalyst for dissent within Dylan's band. Chris has feelings for her and wants to be in a band with her. Roxanne shows a more vulnerable side during Season 4 when it was revealed she was a victim of abuse at the hands of her father.
- Andrew Baskin as Chris McDonald (seasons 2–4) – A troubled youth often at odds with others, especially Dylan. He plays guitar and aspires to be a rock star. Seen as a hoodlum, he later makes a genuine attempt to change his ways and develops feelings for Ashley. They date briefly, but Ashley finally leaves him due to his true abusive nature and his interest in Roxanne, when Roxanne and Chris become especially scornful. After seemingly losing everything and accepting his fate as an outcast, he turns around when Russ makes a genuine attempt to befriend him.
- Lisa Warner as Stacy Collins (seasons 2–4) – An awkward and timid girl who begins an unlikely friendship with Brooke. While she initially looks up to Brooke and aspires to be her friend, Stacy begins to tire of her attitude. She then begins to do the same towards Roxanne.
- David Wight as David O'Brien (seasons 2–4) – The student manager/trainer of the basketball team. While a bit shy, Dave doesn't hesitate to stand up for himself or others when provoked. He especially looks up to Matt.
- Arseman Yohannes as Arseman Harrell (seasons 2–4) – Arseman is a cheerful, candid person who often lends other students advice or a kind ear. She has a good singing voice, which attracts the attention of Dylan's band. She eventually leaves due to her hatred of the way the band is run, and later dates Dylan.
- John Boyd as John DiMarco (seasons 2–3) – A prankster who catches the wrath of Billy over a joke he pulls on him.
- Erin Inglis as Erin Walker (seasons 2–3) – Matt's adoring younger sister, Erin is protective of her brother and is easily offended by rumors about him.
- Claire Langlois as Amanda Morgan (season 2) – Brooke's other sister. Amanda provokes her sister's ire after she tattles on Brooke to her parents. Billy has a crush on Amanda, but she bluntly rejects him, calling him immature. She steals Courtney's necklace and allows Janice to take the blame for it, and Brooke exacts her revenge by telling the whole school about it, leaving Amanda an outcast by the season's end.
- Rekha Shah as Janice (season 2) – An overly eager and awkward new transfer student who has difficulty making friends upon her arrival. She eventually befriends Courtney and Arseman, but is then accused by Brooke of stealing an heirloom necklace of Courtney's, is shunned by her classmates, and decides to transfer schools again. It turns out Brooke's sister Amanda, not Janice, was the thief, and Courtney and Janice reconcile, though not before Janice transfers out of Hillside.
- Minna Koch as Lea (season 2) – Lea befriends Erin when the latter is having difficulty fitting in at school.
- James Greye as Richard (season 3) – Responsible for booking the musical acts at The Avalon.
- Micah Cox as Micah (season 4) – A player on the boys soccer team. Micah briefly clashes with Pepper over her success at his expense.
- Russell Dayvault as Russ Talbot (season 4) – Pepper's best friend. When Russ has health complications, his friends become concerned.
- Erin Donovan as Brittany Nichols (season 4) – Brittany is highly aware of her attractiveness and not beyond using it to her benefit. She has an acute knowledge of football.
- Elizabeth Ortiz as Liz (season 4) – Similar to Courtney's character, Liz is a reserved student who enjoys writing poetry, later forming a friendship with Roxanne.
- Pepper Binkley as Pepper O'Brien (season 4) – Dave's tomboy sister who is heavily into sports. She later tries out for the boys' soccer team.
- Allison Bloom as Jennifer Locke (season 4) – A spiritual successor to Brooke, Jennifer is a shallow and materialistic individual from a wealthy family. She makes a point to insult everyone she comes across and is jealous of her younger brother, who has a remarkably high I.Q.
- David Whitty as Michael Rowland (season 4) – Star Football Team Captain & Quarterback. Brittany takes a quick interest in Michael, creating tension between him and Billy.
- Jason Angel as Jason Locke (season 4) – The precocious younger brother of Jennifer, whose knowledge often helps solve other student's dilemmas.
- Loyal Pyczynski as Loyal (season 4) – Introduced late in the series, Loyal is Billy's new stepbrother from his mother's marriage to Billy's father.

== Episodes ==
Season	Episodes	Originally released	
Season	Episodes	First released	Last released
1	13	February 3, 1991	April 28, 1991
2	13	August 4, 1991	October 27, 1991
3	13	February 2, 1992	April 26, 1992
4	26	November 1, 1992	April 25, 1993

The entire first season is available for download from iTunes. The first season was previously on Hulu and the entire series currently streams on Amazon Prime Video.

As of 2021, all four seasons are available through FilmRise on devices such as Roku and Amazon Fire TV. All four seasons are also available through FilmRise for streaming on IMDb TV, now known as Freevee.

== Production notes ==
The series' head writer for all 65 episodes was Ian Weir, who wrote all but five episodes. Its director was Michael Berry.

Season 1 was taped from September to October 1990. Season 2 was taped from June to July 1991. Season 3 was taped in December 1991. Season 4 was taped from August to September 1992.

The first season of the show was filmed in Vancouver, British Columbia, while the second season was filmed at the studios of CJOH-TV (where fellow Nickelodeon series You Can't Do That on Television was also based) in Ottawa, Ontario. The third and fourth seasons were taped at Nickelodeon Studios at Universal Studios in Orlando, Florida. Both Seasons 3 & 4 were taped in Nickelodeon Studios' Stage 18.

== Awards and nominations ==
Year	Award	Result	Category	Recipient
1993	Young Artist Awards	Nominated	Best Young Actor Co-starring in a Cable Series	Ryan Reynolds
1993	Young Artist Awards	Nominated	Best Young Actor Starring in a Cable Series	Chris William Martin
1993	Young Artist Awards	Nominated	Best Young Actress Co-starring in a Cable Series	Arseman Yohannes
1993	Young Artist Awards	Nominated	Best Young Actress Starring in a Cable Series	Laura Harris
1993	Young Artist Awards	Nominated	Best Young Actress Starring in a Cable Series	Robyn Ross
