= Hope II =

1907–1908 painting by Gustav Klimt

- Die Hoffnung II (German)
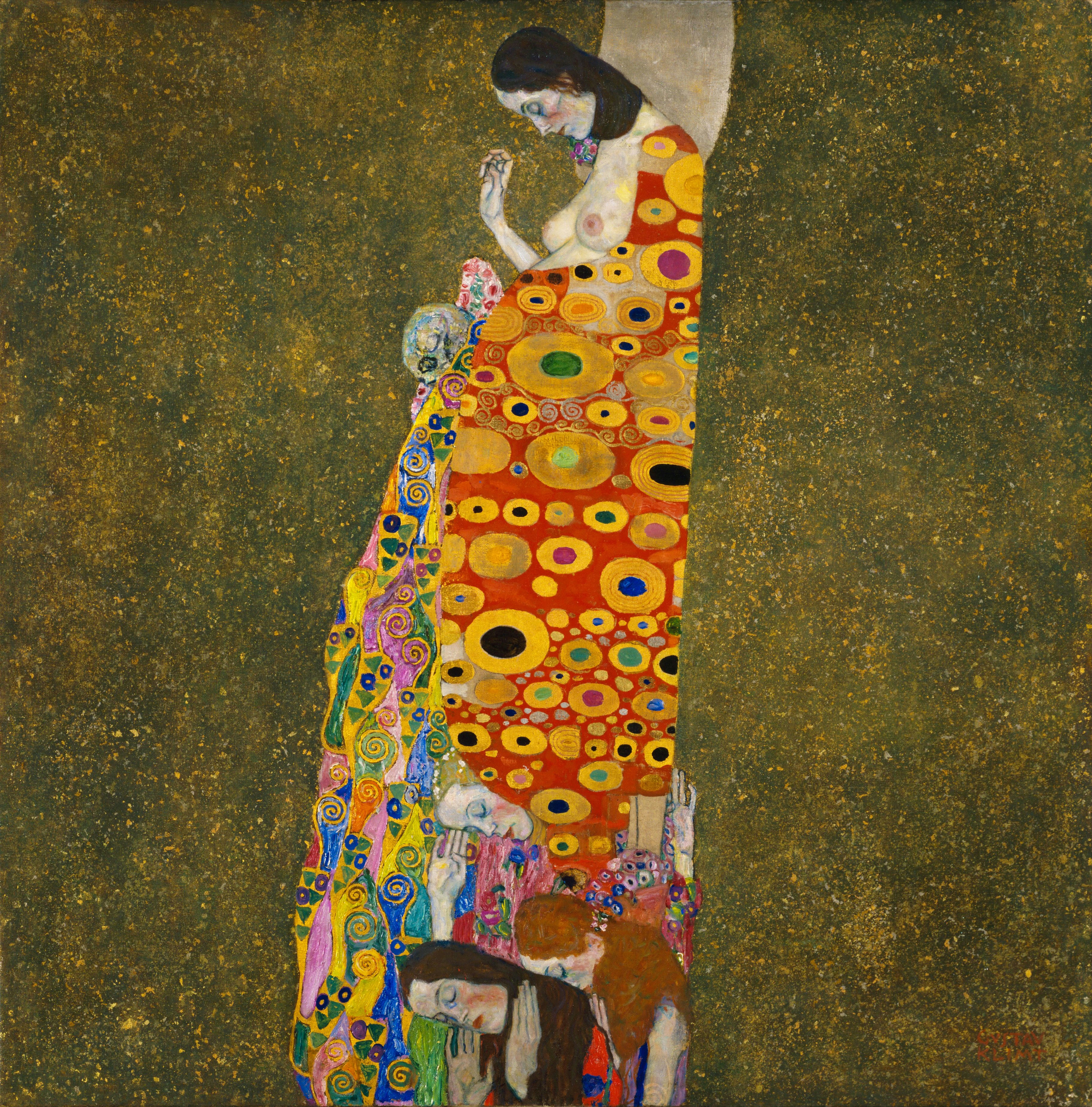
- Artist: Gustav Klimt
- Year: 1907–1908
- Medium: Oil-on-canvas
- Subject: Pregnant woman
- Dimensions: 110.5 cm × 110.5 cm (43.5 in × 43.5 in)
- Location: Museum of Modern Art, New York
- Accession: 468.1978

Hope II (German: Die Hoffnung II) is a 1907–1908 oil-on-canvas painting with gold and platinum, by the Austrian symbolist painter Gustav Klimt. It depicts a pregnant woman with closed eyes and was the second of Klimt's works to focus on a pregnant woman, both depicting Herma, one of his favourite models. It was originally entitled Vision by Klimt, but has become known as Hope II after the earlier work Hope, which is now distinguished as Hope I. Hope II was acquired by the Museum of Modern Art in New York City in 1978.

== Background ==
Although rare in the history of painting, Klimt frequently depicted pregnant women despite it being taboo at the time. Klimt first explored the theme in Hope I (1903), in which the heavily pregnant model, Herma, is depicted naked. It was considered outrageous by contemporaries and was rejected from the 1901 Secession exhibition on the grounds of obscenity. A later work of the same subject, Hope II was clothed and therefore less provocative. Hope II was painted at the same time as The Kiss and is similar in terms of composition and colouring.

== Description ==
In Hope II, she is wearing a long dress or cloak decorated with geometric shapes. She has long brown hair and closed eyes, bowing her head towards her bare breasts and burgeoning abdomen. A human skull representing death appears from behind her stomach – perhaps a sign of the dangers of labour, or possibly a memento mori (in Hope I, she is also accompanied by a skull and several deathlike figures). At the foot of the painting, three women also bow their heads, as if praying or perhaps mourning.

The square painting measures 110.5 by 110.5 centimetres (43.5 in × 43.5 in). The women occupy the central third of the painting, with a darker gold-flecked background to either side. The woman's clothing, decorated with gold leaf like a Byzantine artwork and richly coloured and patterned, but flat like an Orthodox icon, contrasts with the delicately painted and contoured human faces and bare flesh, and also with the darker tones of the background.

At some point between 1909 and 1914, Klimt painted over the halo above the pregnant woman's head and added the skull above her belly.

== Reception and history ==
Hope II was exhibited at the 1908 Kunstschau alongside other allegorical works by Klimt, The Kiss (1908) and Danaë (1907). At the International Art Exhibition in Vienna in 1909, the painting was exhibited under the name Vision. Due to the scandalous nudity of its central figure, Hope I was not exhibited until the second Vienna Kunstschau the following year.

The painting was acquired by Eugenie Primavesi before December 1914, and it was sold in the late 1930s by the Neue Galerie of Otto Kallir or his successor Vita Künstler. It remained in private collections until 1978, when it was sold by Hans Barnas. It is now in the collection of the Museum of Modern Art (MoMA) in New York City, United States.

== See also ==
- List of paintings by Gustav Klimt
