= Water Serpents II =

1907 painting by Gustav Klimt

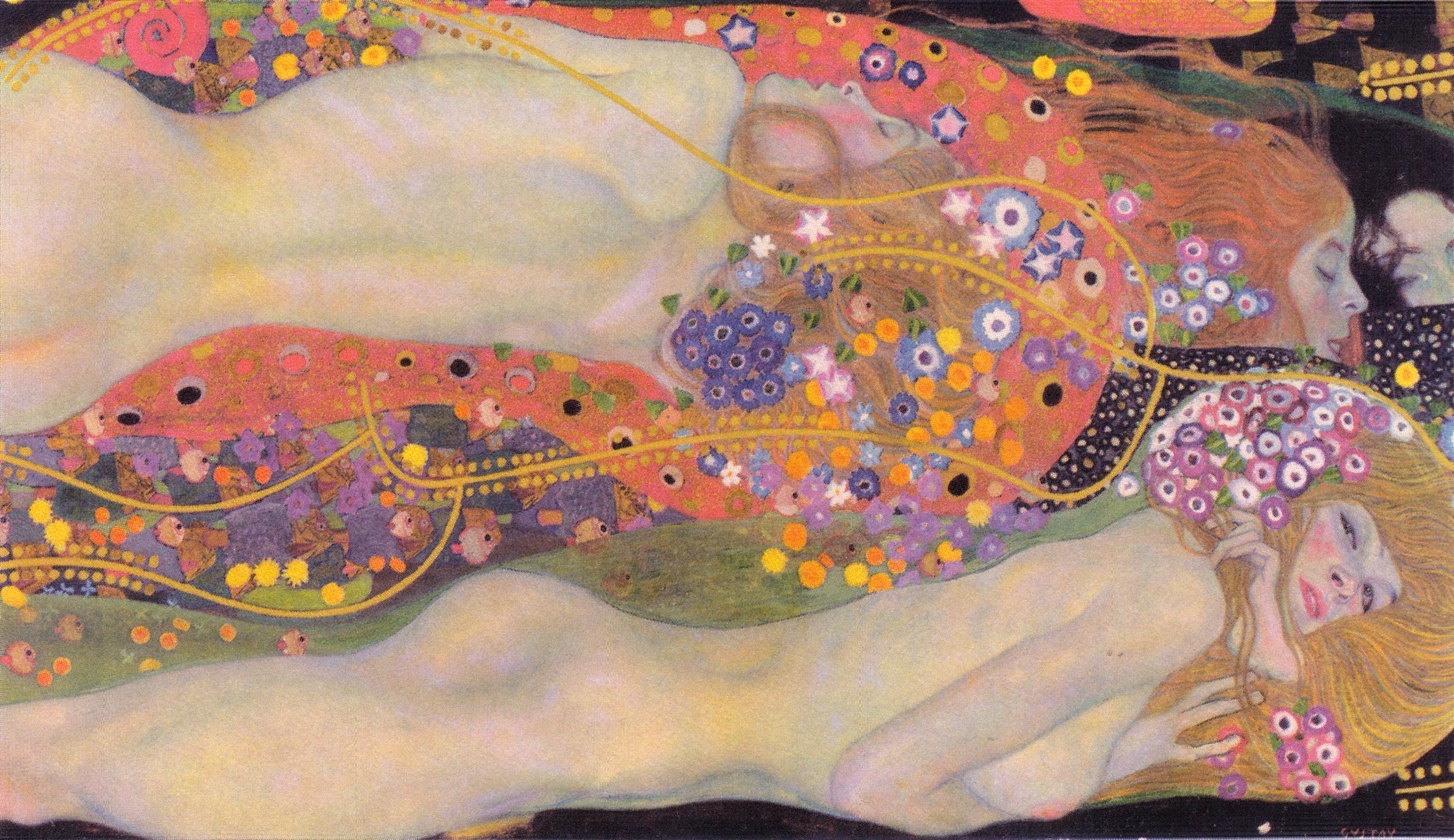
- Artist: Gustav Klimt
- Year: 1904–1907
- Medium: Oil on canvas
- Dimensions: 80 cm × 145 cm (31 in × 57 in)
- Location: Private collection, Asia

Water Serpents II, also referred to as Wasserschlangen II, is an oil painting made in 1907 by the Austrian artist Gustav Klimt. It is the follow-up painting to the earlier painting Water Serpents I. Like the first painting, Water Serpents II deals with the sensuality of women's bodies and same-sex relationships. The painting has a rich history. During World War II, it was stolen by the Nazis, and more recently, it has been the center of a controversy surrounding its record 2013 sale. As of March 2024, it is the 6th most expensive painting in the world and the most expensive work by Klimt to sell.

== Origins ==
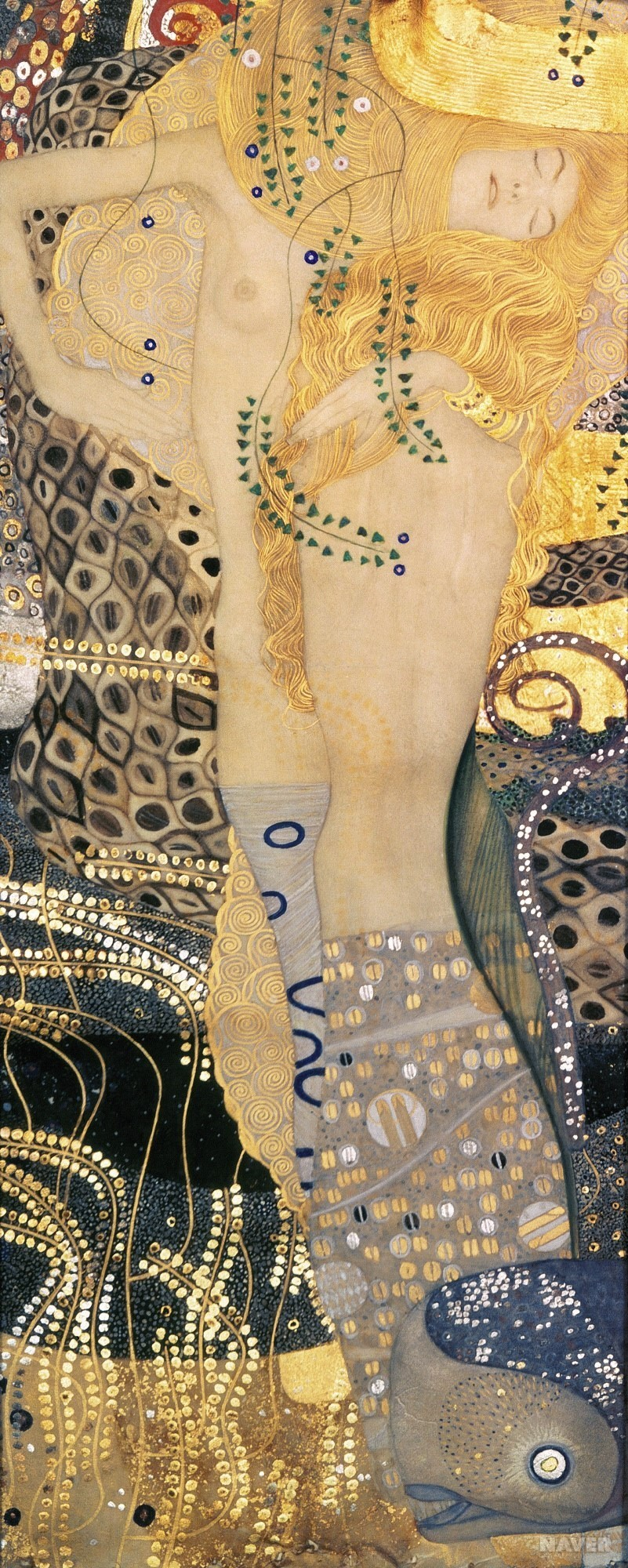
Klimt's Water Serpents I

The painting is an oil on canvas. It was started by Klimt in 1904 and finished in either 1906 or 1907. It was originally commissioned for and owned by Jenny Steiner, the daughter of a Viennese industrialist. The painting was the last in a series of works, which include Moving Water (1898), Medicine (1901), Goldfish (1902), and Water Serpents I (1904), that all had water nymphs as the subjects of the painting.

== Subject and meaning ==
The painting features a group of four water nymphs, portrayed in lustful bliss. Two are seen in the foreground in full nudity; the other two can be found in the top right corner of the piece, and only their heads are visible. The painting can be seen as a non-controversial portrayal of mythical figures, which had been common in art for centuries. But it has also been interpreted as a depiction of a lesbian orgy. According to this interpretation, since same-sex relationships were not acceptable at the time, Klimt disguised the women as mythical figures. This is supported by the fact that the main character's pubic hair is showing, and she is glaring sensually at the viewer. This glare is reminiscent of the way the subject glares at the viewer in the painting Olympia by Manet. This painting, and its lesbian subjects, is seen as a precursor to later Klimt paintings such as Women Friends (1917), which displayed lesbian relationships more openly.

== History ==
=== World War II ===
The painting's owner, Jenny Steiner, was Jewish, and she was forced to flee Vienna to Portugal in 1938 under threat from the Nazis. Following Steiner's escape, the painting, like many others, was confiscated by the Nazis. It was given to a Nazi filmmaker named Gustav Ucicky. Ucicky is rumored to be one of Klimt's many illegitimate children.

=== Post war ===
Following the end of the war, Ucicky retained possession of the painting, and it hung on a wall in his apartment in Vienna. In 1961, Ucicky died, and he left the painting to his wife, Ursula. This whole time, the painting was considered lost.

=== 21st century ===
In 2012, Ursula Ucicky put the painting up for sale with Sotheby's acting as the broker. Because the painting was still considered stolen art, Ursula had to come to an agreement with the heirs of Jenny Steiner, the rightful owner of the painting, in order to obtain an export license for the painting. The agreement, which was mediated by the Israelitische Kultusgemeinde Wien, or Vienesse Jewish Community, stipulated that the proceeds would be split 50/50 between Ursula and the heirs. That same year, the painting was sold to art broker Yves Bouvier for $112 million, which meant each party received around $56 million. The heirs of Jenny Steiner used their portion of the proceeds to found the New Klimt Foundation.

==== The Bouvier Affair ====
In 2013 Yves Bouvier sold the painting for $183.3 million to Russian billionaire Dmitry Rybolovlev, one of the largest private art collectors in the world. Rybolovlev later alleged that Bouvier did not disclose he was the owner of the painting and instead made it seem like the painting was owned by a third party, supposedly enabling him to inflate the selling price. Rybolovlev has unsuccessfully sought charges and brought lawsuits against Bouvier.

=== Present day ===
In 2015, the painting was once again sold by Rybolovlev. This time, it was sold for $170 million to an undisclosed buyer. The painting is rumored to be in the private collection of an unnamed Qatari Princess or Asian buyer. The Belvedere Museum in Vienna and the Van Gogh Museum in Amsterdam located the painting in preparation of a new exhibition on Klimt and those he was inspired by. From October 2022 until February 2023, the painting was exhibited at the Van Gogh Museum in Amsterdam as part of the "Golden Boy - Gustav Klimt" exhibition. From February 2023, the painting was exhibited at the Belvedere Museum as part of the "Klimt. Inspired by Van Gogh, Rodin, Matisse..." exhibition.

== See also ==
- List of paintings by Gustav Klimt
