= Apple Tree II =

1916 painting by Gustav Klimt

- Apfelbaum II (German)
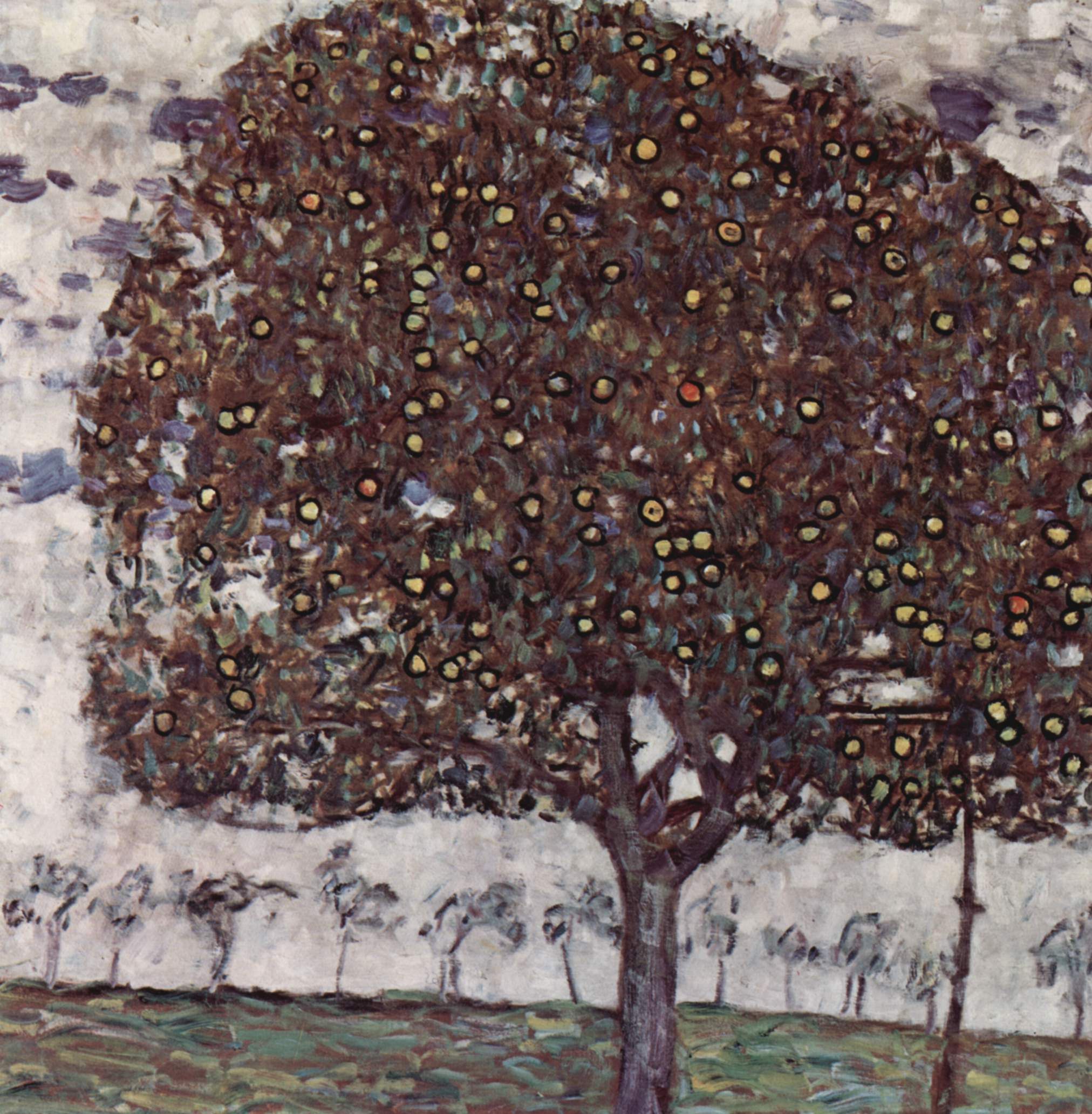
- Artist: Gustav Klimt
- Year: 1916
- Medium: Oil on canvas
- Dimensions: 80 cm × 80 cm (31 in × 31 in)
- Location: Private collection

Apple Tree II (German. Apfelbaum II or Der Apfelbaum) is a 1916 landscape by Austrian artist Gustav Klimt. Austria mistakenly restituted the painting to the wrong family due to confusion with another Klimt painting, "Rosiers sous les arbres ("Roses under the Trees").

== History of the painting ==
Klimt painted several artworks depicted trees. One of them was Apple Tree II which he painted in 1916. Over the years, several different stories, of varying accuracy, have been told about the itinerary of Klimt's Apple Tree II. In 2018, after Apple Tree II was pulled from an exhibition at the Leopold Museum, Austrian officials confirmed that they had made an error, and that the painting's provenance needed to be corrected. They stated that the original owner was the famous Viennese Jewish art collector Serena Lederer 1867-1943) and not, as they had previously thought, a different famous Viennese Jewish art collector Nora Stiasny.

Lederer lent Apple Tree II to an exhibition in 1926 and it was documented as Lederer property after 1938, when Austria merged with Nazi Germany in the Anschluss. The Lederers owned a large and important collection of Klimt paintings, including portraits of members of their family. The Nazis seized many of August and Serena Lederer's paintings.

A Nazi party member and film director named Gustav Ucicky obtained Apple Tree II somehow. In 1961, Ucicky donated Apple Tree II to the Belvedere Museum.

== Restitution to the wrong family ==
In the 1990s the Stiasny heirs filed a restitution claim for a Klimt in the Belvedere collection which they mistakenly thought had been owned by their family, when in fact it had been owned by the Lederer family.

In 2001, Austria's Art Restitution Advisory Board cemented the error by "returning" Apple Tree II to an heir of Nora Stiansy, Hermine Müller-Hofmann. Müller-Hofmann's nephew, Viktor Hoffmann, sold the Klimt to the French collector Bernard Arnault.

In 2015 Austria's Commission for Provenance Research confirmed that it had misidentified the painting, confusing Apple Tree II with a different Klimt painting entitled Roses under the Trees, and restituted it to the wrong family. Nora Stiasy had owned Roses under the Trees, the Commission stated, not Apple Tree II.

In fact Apple Tree II had belonged to a different Jewish family of art patrons, the Lederers. However, when the Lederers, attempted to recover their painting, Austrian officials rejected their demand.

It is thought that after Serena Lederer's death in 1943, her children Elisabeth Bachofen-Echt (1894-1944) and Erich Lederer (1896-1985) inherited the work, but it is not known how Gustav Ucicky gained possession of it.

== Viennese Jewish art collector dynasties ==
The glittering art culture of pre-Nazi Vienna was supported by Jewish art patrons and collectors, who were massively plundered and murdered under the Nazis.

Both the Zuckerhandl/Stiasny and the Lederer families were great Viennese art collectors and patrons of Klimt, who painted beautiful portraits of members of both families. Famous examples include the portrait of Serena Lederer and the portrait of Amalie Zuckerhandl, the mother of Nora Stiasny.

Apple Tree II was confused with a different Klimt, entitled "Roses Under the Trees" which hung at the Orsay Museum (Rosiers sous les arbres inv. RF 1980-195). On March 15, 2021 France's Minister of Culture announced that France would restitute Rosiers sous les arbres to the heirs of Nora Stiasny (1898-1942), who had owned the painting and who was murdered in the Holocaust.

The Lederers have been unable to recover Apple Tree II, even after the restitution to the wrong family was recognized. The Lederers have registered 64 search requests for Klimts on the German Lost Art Foundation Lost Art Database.

== See also ==
- List of paintings by Gustav Klimt
- List of Claims for Restitution for Nazi-looted art
- The Holocaust in Austria
- Provenance Research
