= List of paintings by Gustav Klimt =

This is a list of paintings by Austrian symbolist painter Gustav Klimt (1862–1918). It is believed that Klimt painted over 200 paintings, of which over 160 are known.

== List of paintings by Gustav Klimt ==
=== Early works ===
Image	Title	Year	Medium	Location	Notes
	Klara Klimt	c. 1880	Oil on canvas, 30.3 cm × 21.3 cm	Leopold Museum	Klara Klimt (1860 – 1937) was the oldest of Gustav’s six siblings and they shared an apartment with their sister Hermine until Gustav’s death in 1918. The painting shows Klara around the age of 20 and Klimt painted it while studying at the Vienna School of Arts and Crafts. It is exhibited on permanent loan from a descendant of Klimt.
	Forest Floor	1881/'82	Oil on canvas, 10 cm × 8 cm	Leopold Museum	
	Allegory of Merry and Solemn Art	1882/'83	Distemper on canvas, c. 1200 cm × 600 cm	FX Šalda Theatre, Liberec	Painted in collaboration with Ernst Klimt and Franz von Matsch.
	Male Nude	1883	Oil on canvas, 68 cm × 54.8 cm	Österreichische Galerie Belvedere	
	Sitting Nude Man Turned to the Left	1883	Oil on canvas, 46 cm × 37 cm	Leopold Museum	The painting was dated by Klimt himself, painted during his time as a student at the Vienna School of Arts and Crafts.
	Fable or Allegory of Fable	1883	Oil on canvas, 83.5 cm × 116 cm	Vienna Museum	
	Head Study of a Girl from Haná	c. 1883	Oil on wood, 28.6 cm × 22.7 cm	Leopold Museum	This small painting is undated, however, it is presumed that it was created when Gustav Klimt was still a student.
	Idyll or Allegory of Idyll	1884	Oil on canvas, 49.7 cm × 74 cm	Vienna Museum	
	The Theatre at Taormina	1886–'88	Oil on marble plaster, c. 750 cm × 600 cm	Burgtheater north staircase	The main ceiling panel in the Vienna Burgtheater's north staircase. This was done as part of the joint commission to help decorate the new Burgtheater, in collaboration with Ernst Klimt and Franz Matsch, who painted other works in the theatre.
	The Cart of Thespis	1886–'88	Oil on marble plaster, c. 280 cm × 400 cm	Burgtheater south staircase	Part of the Burgtheater commission.
	Shakespeare's Globe Theatre	1886–'88	Oil on marble plaster, c. 280 cm × 600 cm	Burgtheater south staircase	Part of the Burgtheater commission.
	The Altar of Dionysis	1886–'88	Oil on marble plaster, c. 160 cm × 1200 cm	Burgtheater tympanum south staircase	The last of Klimt's paintings to be completed for the Burgtheater commission.
	Auditorium of the Old Burgtheater	1888–'89	Gouache on paper, 82 cm × 92 cm	Vienna Museum	
	Sappho	c. 1888	Oil on canvas, 39.4 cm × 31.7 cm	Vienna Museum	Representation of the Greek lyric poet born on the island of Lesbos. Still in the sketch stage, this painting fuses the Pre-Raphaelites' influence with the literary and dreamy symbolism of Moreau. Built on orthogonal lines, the canvas is pervaded by an allegoric mythology already present in Klimt's Burgtheater work. The detailed descriptive traits are a consequence of the period's historicism style, celebrating beauty in an atmosphere of refined archaism.

=== 1890s ===
Image	Title	Year	Medium	Location	Notes
	Portrait of Joseph Pembaur	1890	Oil on canvas, 68.4 cm × 55.4 cm	Tyrolean State Museum	A realistic portrait of pianist and piano teacher, Joseph Pembaur. The photographic realism of the face generates a subtle tension with the symbolism of the stylised elements. In this period, the stylistic dilemma tormenting Klimt between historicism and symbolism is here resolved by the mediation of archaic forms, which attribute to Music, as identified by the instruments, an absolute and eternal value. Also known as Portrait of Joseph Pembauer.
	Portrait of Mathilde Trau	c. 1893	Oil on canvas, 79 cm × 58.5 cm	Österreichische Galerie Belvedere	The painting depicts Mathilde Trau, the wife of Franz Trau, who ran a famous tea shop in Vienna. Klimt also painted a portrait of him. In terms of format and composition, this portrait is comparable to contemporary portrait photographs. The painting technique reflects a realism similar to the aesthetics of photography. However, beginning in the mid-1890s, Klimt's artistic approach shifted towards an impressionistically influenced and more atmospheric style.
Portrait of a Woman by Gustav Klimt, completed 1893 or 1894	Portrait of a Woman	1893/'94	Oil on canvas, 168 cm × 84 cm	Österreichische Galerie Belvedere	A realistic full-length portrait of a woman in a black dress and Klimt's first representative portrait of a woman. The subject is Marie Breunig, a friend and client of fashion designer Emilie Flöge, Klimt's life companion.
	Portrait of an unknown woman (Mrs. Heymann?)	c. 1894	Oil on paperboard, 30 cm × 23 cm	Vienna Museum	An inscription names the subject as Mrs. Heymann.
	Seated Young Girl	c. 1894	Oil on wood, 14.1 cm × 9.6 cm	Leopold Museum	
	Love or Allegory of Love	1895	Oil on canvas, 62.5 cm × 46.5 cm	Vienna Museum	For its evanescent rarefaction the love scene reveals its symbolist mould. The work is part of Klimt's series of Allegories and Emblems, whose intent was to translate life's most significant moments, and its psychological nuances, into forms of metaphorical intensity.
	Music I	1895	Oil on canvas, 37 cm × 44.5 cm	Neue Pinakothek	Allegoric representation of Music, which Klimt painted several times in various renderings. Besides the lyre, symbol of music, this particular canvas emphasises the sphinx (alluding to artistic freedom), the Silenus mask on the extreme left, the lion's teeth at the centre (a metaphor of the spread of new ideas), and finally the woman's meditative face.
	Josef Lewinsky as Carlos in Clavigo	1895	Oil on canvas, 60 cm × 44 cm	Österreichische Galerie Belvedere	Klimt depicts the court actor Josef Lewinsky on stage, as Carlos in Clavigo, a tragedy by Goethe. The painting was commissioned as an illustration for a book on the history of Viennese theatre.
	Portrait of a Lady with a Purple Scarf	c. 1895	Oil on canvas, 67 cm × 41 cm	Kunsthistorisches Museum	Also known as Portrait of a Lady with a Lilac Scarf. The painting was in a private collection for almost a century before being bequeathed to the Kunsthistorisches Museum in 2014.
	The Blind Man	c. 1896	Oil on canvas, 66 cm × 53 cm	Leopold Museum	Klimt likely paid this man to pose for him. This work was exhibited at the first Secessionist exhibition.
	Portrait of an Old Man in Profile (Count Traun?)	c. 1896	Oil on cardboard, 46 cm × 35.2 cm	Leopold Museum	While the painting's title suggests that it was a portrait commission, the identity of the subject is not known. When Klimt died, the painting was still in his possession, making it unlikely that it was commissioned by a third party. Therefore it is probable that Klimt painted this work on his own interest.
	Prince William Nii Nortey Dowuona	1897	Oil on canvas, 66.5 cm × 53.5 cm	Private collection	Klimt painted the work in 1897 after a visit to a Vienna Zoo that sometimes also held exhibitions of people. The painting disappeared when the Jewish owners, Ernestine and Felix Klein, fled to Monaco in 1938 to avoid Nazi persecution. The painting reappeared in 2023 when it was identified by the Wienerroither & Kohlbacher gallery.
	Woman in an Armchair or Lady in an Armchair	1897–'98	Oil on board, 52 cm × 52 cm	Private collection	
	Portrait of Sonja Knips	1897/'98	Oil on canvas, 141.5 cm × 141.5 cm	Österreichische Galerie Belvedere	The baroness Sonja Knips was one of Klimt's most prominent clients. In this painting, Klimt chose the square format for a portrait for the first time. This portrait helped him in becoming one of the most sought-after portraitists in Viennese society at the time. With a style reminding of the Belgian artist Fernand Khnopff, Klimt paints Knips, who was active with her husband in the circle of the Wiener Werkstätte. The face's plasticity contrasts with the soft inconsistency of the fluffy dress. In this diagonal composition, the evanescence of the chair, the book's red blur, the head surrounded by flowers, all anticipate the portraits of the golden period.
	Lady with a Cape and Hat or Lady with Cape and Hat in Front of Red Background	1897/'98	Oil on canvas, 30 cm × 19.5 cm	Klimt Foundation Vienna	
	Lady by the Fireplace	1897/'98	Oil on canvas, 41 cm × 66 cm	Österreichische Galerie Belvedere	
(black & white image)	The Music or Music II	1897/'98	Oil on canvas, 150 cm × 200 cm	N/A	Destroyed by fire in 1945
	Portrait of Helene Klimt	1898	Oil on cardboard, 60 cm × 40 cm	Private collection	Depicting Klimt's six-year-old niece, whom Klimt helped look after following the death of his brother Ernst in 1892. Klimt became her legal guardian.
	Pallas Athena	1898	Oil on canvas, 75 cm × 75 cm	Vienna Museum	Enhanced by the golden frame created by Klimt's brother, Georg, the goddess Athena is portrayed in front of a frieze borrowed from a black-figure Attic vase of the 6th century BC. The red hair comes out of the helmet so as to underscore the goddess' femininity, notwithstanding her armour. Following the example of the Munich Secession, Athena is chosen as the patron numen of the Vienna Secession.
	Moving Water	1898	Oil on canvas, 52 cm × 65 cm	Private collection	
	Full-Face Head of a Girl	1898	Oil on canvas, 38 cm × 43 cm	Private collection	
	Orchard in the Evening	1898	Oil on canvas, 69 cm × 55.6 cm	Leopold Museum	Exhibited on permanent loan from a private Austrian collection.
	After the Rain or Garden with Chickens in St. Agatha	1898	Oil on canvas, 80 cm × 40 cm	Österreichische Galerie Belvedere	In August 1898, Klimt spent his first summer in the Salzkammergut, staying in St. Agatha near Lake Hallstatt with the Flöge family. There, he painted four landscapes, including After the Rain. These works already show the influence of French Impressionism through soft, fleeting brushwork, as well as inspiration from Japanese woodcuts. After the Rain became Klimt’s first work to enter a public collection in 1900. The oblong format and the particular photographic style affirm their Japanese derivation. The rainy mist enveloping the whole, as well as the ornamental interpretation of every element, recall Whistler's evanescent landscapes.
	Girl in the Foliage	c. 1896–'99	Oil on canvas, 32.4 cm × 24 cm	Klimt Foundation Vienna	
	Full-Face Portrait of a Lady	c. 1898–'99	Oil on cardboard, 45 cm × 34 cm	Private collection	
	Schubert at the Piano	1899	Oil on canvas, 150 cm × 200 cm	N/A	Destroyed by fire in 1945. Critic and writer Hermann Bahr (1863–1934) wrote: "Klimt's Schubert is the finest painting ever done by an Austrian". The painting was destroyed by retreating German forces in 1945.
	Serena Pulitzer Lederer	1899	Oil on canvas, 190.8 cm × 85.4 cm	Metropolitan Museum of Art	
	Nuda Veritas	1899	Oil on canvas, 252 cm × 56.2 cm	Austrian Theatre Museum	The frame's upper margin quotes a verse by Schiller, indicating, in its difficult consensus, a distinctive sign of quality: "If you can't please everyone with your deeds and your art – please only a few. To please many is bad. Schiller." Aim of this quote is to incite the Vienna Secession to action. Another version of this work exists as an etching for the magazine Ver Sacrum. The mirror held by Veritas is a modern invitation to "Know yourself", whereas the flowers are symbols of regeneration.
	A Morning by the Pond, Still Pond or Reflection	1899	Oil on canvas, 75.2 cm × 75.2 cm	Leopold Museum	Klimt's first square landscape it was painted in Eglsee during a summer with the Flöge family in Golling. The painting’s style is reminiscent of Monet’s atmospheric landscapes.
	Water Nymphs (Silver Fish) or Mermaids	c. 1899	Oil on canvas, 82 cm × 52 cm	Bank Austria Kunstforum	It portrays two submerged figures devoid of bodies or limbs, instead composed of heads and long, black hair. This unconventional depiction challenges typical mermaid imagery with a disturbing variation and takes hair fetishism to its extreme, producing sex objects with no limbs, bodies or even sex organs. Their simple form is open to a range of interpretations: from severed heads in mythology to cherubic figures or the serpent of Eden. Klimt combines a range of archetypal themes and delivers a sensation of unease.

=== 1900s ===
Image	Title	Year	Medium	Location	Notes
	Old Man on His Deathbed	1900	Oil on cardboard, 30.4 cm × 44.8 cm	Österreichische Galerie Belvedere	Klimt often depicted the dead in his work although they were rarely publicly exhibited due to their personal nature. While such subjects are usually identifiable, the identity of the old man in this portrait is unknown. Klimt often painted shortly after a subject’s death, sometimes on the same day, suggesting the man may have died in 1900. The painting was likely cropped, so today only part of the original composition remains.
1900 painting by Gustav Klimt	The Black Bull	1900	Oil on canvas, 82 cm × 82 cm	Leopold Museum	
	The Large Poplar I	1900	Oil on canvas, 81.3 cm × 80.3 cm	Neue Galerie New York	
(black & white image)	Portrait of Trude Steiner	1900	Oil on canvas, 140 cm × 80 cm	Unknown	Lost since 1941.
	On Lake Attersee	1900	Oil on canvas, 80.2 cm × 80.2 cm	Leopold Museum	Contemporary critics praised the painting at the 10th Secession Exhibition in 1901. It was painted from the jetty of a small boathouse by the Flöge residence during his first stay on the Attersee in the summer of 1900.
	Farmhouse with Birch Trees or Young Birches	1900	Oil on canvas, 80.3 cm × 80.3 cm	Private collection	
	Portrait of Rose von Rosthorn-Freidmann	1900/'01	Oil on canvas, 140 cm × 80 cm	Private collection	
	The Swamp or The Marshy Pond	1900/'01	Oil on canvas, 80 cm × 80 cm	Private collection	
	Cows in the Stable or Cows in the Barn	1900–'01	Oil on canvas, 75 cm × 76.5 cm	Lentos Art Museum	
	Lakeshore with Birches	1901	Oil on canvas, 90 cm × 90 cm	Private collection	
	Fruit Trees	1901	Oil on canvas, 90 cm × 90 cm	Private collection	
	Farmhouse in Kammer on Lake Attersee (Mill)	1901	Oil on canvas, 88 cm × 88 cm	Private collection	
	Judith I	1901	Oil and gold leaf on canvas, 84 cm × 42 cm	Österreichische Galerie Belvedere	The painting depicts the biblical character of Judith holding the severed head of Holofernes. Judith's face exudes a mixed charge of voluptuousness and perversion. Its traits are transfigured so as to obtain the greatest degree of intensity and seduction, which Klimt achieves by placing the woman on an unattainable plane. Notwithstanding the alteration of features, one can recognise Klimt's friend and maybe lover Adele Bloch-Bauer, the subject of another two portraits respectively done in 1907 and 1912, and also painted in the Pallas Athena. The slightly lifted head has a sense of pride, whereas her visage is languid and sensual, with parted lips in between defiance and seduction. The contrast between the black hair and the golden luminosity of the background enhance elegance and exaltation. The fashionable hairdo is emphasised by the stylised motifs of the trees fanning on the sides.
	Fir Forest I or Pine Forest I	1901	Oil on canvas, 90.5 cm × 90 cm	Zug Art Museum	
	Pine Forest II	1901	Oil on canvas, 91.5 cm × 89 cm	Private collection	
	Insel im Attersee ('Island in Lake Attersee')	1902	Oil on canvas, 100 cm × 100 cm	Private collection	Sold at Sotheby's New York for US$53.2M in 2023.
	Portrait of Marie Henneberg	1901–'02	Oil on canvas, 140 cm × 100 cm	Kunstmuseum Moritzburg Halle (Saale)	
	Goldfish	1901–'02	Oil on canvas, 181 cm × 66.5 cm	Kunstmuseum Solothurn	Klimt initially thought to title the painting To my critics in response to criticism received for his Faculty Paintings at the University of Vienna. The canvas has a symbolic intention and is dominated by the bare back, reminiscent of Rodin.
	Beethoven Frieze	1901–'02		Secession Building	A painted interpretation of the final choral movement of Beethoven's Ninth Symphony (1824).
	Beech Grove I or Beech Forest I	c. 1902	Oil on canvas, 100 cm × 100 cm	Albertinum	
	Portrait of Emilie Flöge	1902	Oil on canvas, 178 cm × 80 cm	Vienna Museum	
	Portrait of Gertrud Loew (Gertha Felsőványi)	1902	Oil on canvas, 149.5 cm × 45 cm	Private collection	
	The Large Poplar II (Gathering Storm)	1902/'03	Oil on canvas, 100.8 cm × 100.8 cm	Leopold Museum	
	Hope I	1903	Oil on canvas, 189.2 cm × 67 cm	National Gallery of Canada	Portrait of one of Klimt's models, Herma, during her pregnancy. The unusual subject and its formal rendition created critical perplexity, so much so that, in order for Klimt to exhibit this work, he had to give it a religious interpretation. The pregnancy theme had already been present in one of the artist's figures in Medicine and the Beethoven Frieze. In 1907–'08 Klimt will paint a second version, Hope II, this time with the pregnant woman wearing a highly stylised and geometric dress.
	Life is a Struggle (Golden Rider) or The Golden Knight (Life is a Battle)	1903	Oil, tempera, and gold leaf on canvas, 100 cm × 100 cm	Aichi Prefectural Museum of Art	
	Birch Forest (Beech Forest)	1903	Oil on canvas, 110 cm × 110 cm	Private collection	Part of the Republic of Austria v. Altmann court case.
	Will-o'-the-Wisp or Irrlichter	1903	Oil on board laid down on canvas, 52 cm × 59.5 cm	Private collection	The painting had been considered lost until emerging from a private collection in 1978. It had been previously only known from a photo at the 1903 Secession exhibition and references in contemporary publications. For decades it was presumed the painting had been destroyed, like many of Klimt's works in 1945. In this work, Klimt portrays the Will-o'-the-wisp, an atmospheric ghost light appearing in swamps and marshy areas, which was said to often lead foolish travellers astray.
	Pale Face	1903	Oil on canvas, 80 cm × 40 cm	Neue Galerie New York	
	Pear Tree (Pear Trees)	1903	Oil on canvas, 101 cm × 101 cm	Busch-Reisinger Museum (Harvard Art Museums)	
(black & white image)	From the Kingdom of Death or Procession of the Dead	1903	Oil on canvas, 48 cm × 63 cm	Unknown	Lost since 1945.
(black & white image)	Golden Apple Tree (Apple Tree with Golden Apples)	1903	Oil on canvas, 100 cm × 100 cm	N/A	Destroyed by fire in 1945
	Portrait of Hermine Gallia	1904	Oil on canvas, 170.5 cm × 96.5 cm	National Gallery London	Klimt's only painting in a British public collection. Klimt drew over 40 sketches of the sitter before settling on the final pose. Gallia is depicted in a fashionable 'reform' dress. Her face, neckline, hair and hands are realistically modelled while her pendant brooch is the only area of impasto.
	Water Serpents I (Friends), Water Snakes I or The Hydra	1904–'07	Pencil on parchment with watercolour and body colour, heightened with silver gilt, bronze gilt and gold, 50 cm x 20 cm	Österreichische Galerie Belvedere	The painting combines various techniques, including watercolour with gold, silver, platinum, and brass on parchment. It was primarily painted in 1904 with minor additions in 1907. The composition showed stretched slender figures typical of the Jugendstil, which displayed an abstract illustration of a long-haired woman embracing a serpent-like figure.
	Water Serpents II or Water Snakes II	1904–'07	Oil on canvas, 80 cm × 145 cm	Private collection	
	The Three Ages of Woman	1905	Oil on canvas, 180 cm × 180 cm	Galleria Nazionale d'Arte Moderna	This painting won the Prize at the Esposizione d'Arte Internazionale of Rome in 1911 and the following year was purchased by the Roman Galleria Nazionale d'Arte Moderna. The canvas mixes a geometrising decorativism and an unexpected psychological introspection in the expressions of the three figures: the dramatic premonition of death in old age, the tender protectiveness of the young woman, and the contented sleep of the child.
	Margaret Stonborough-Wittgenstein	1905	Oil on canvas, 180 cm × 90 cm	Neue Pinakothek	
	Rose Bushes under the Trees, Roses Among the Trees or Roses beneath Trees	c. 1905	Oil on canvas, 110 cm × 110 cm	Private collection	The painting was restituted to the descendants of its original owner in 2022. It had been stolen by the Nazis from a Jewish family in Austria in 1938, when Nora Stiasny, a Holocaust victim, was forced to sell it under duress. The French state purchased the work in 1980, unaware of its history, and it was displayed at the Musée d’Orsay in Paris until its restitution.
	Flower Garden, Farm Garden, or Cottage Garden	1905–'07	Oil on canvas, 110 cm × 110 cm	Private collection	
	Portrait of Fritza Riedler	1906	Oil on canvas, 153 cm × 133 cm	Österreichische Galerie Belvedere	The painting depicts Fritza Riedler, the wife of a wealthy mechanical engineer. The delicate features of her pale face contrast strikingly with her dark hair. She exhibits not the slightest expression nor movement. Klimt combines a lifelike depiction of the model with an ornamental dissolution of the surroundings, rather than a realistic space. Even the armchair becomes part of this design, made up of flowing lines and eye motifs inspired by ancient Egyptian art. This is characteristic of Klimt's work at this time. Portrait of Fritza Riedler is one of the most exhibited of Klimt's portraits.
	Farm Garden with Sunflowers or Cottage Garden with Sunflowers	1906	Oil on canvas, 110 cm × 110 cm	Österreichische Galerie Belvedere	
(black and white image)	Medicine	1900–'07	Oil on canvas, 430 cm × 300 cm	N/A	Destroyed by fire in 1945
(black and white image)	Philosophy	1900–'07	Oil on canvas, 430 cm × 300 cm	N/A	Destroyed by fire in 1945
(black and white image)	Jurisprudence	1903, final version 1907	Oil on canvas, 430 cm × 300 cm	N/A	Destroyed by fire in 1945
	Orchard or Field of Flowers	c. 1907	Oil on canvas, 98.7 cm × 99.4 cm	Carnegie Museum of Art	
	Portrait of Adele Bloch-Bauer I	1907	Oil, gold and silver on canvas, 140 cm × 140 cm	Neue Galerie New York	Part of the Republic of Austria v. Altmann court case. Both the current holder of the portrait—the Neue Galerie New York—and the art historian Elana Shapira describe how the background and gown contain symbols suggestive of erotica, including triangles, eggs, shapes of eyes and almonds.
	Blooming Poppies, Field of Poppies, or Poppy Field	1907	Oil on canvas, 110 cm × 110 cm	Österreichische Galerie Belvedere	Klimt painted this work in the area around Lake Attersee in Upper Austria, where he spent his summer holidays every year from 1900 onwards.
	Friends I (Sisters)	1907	Oil on canvas, 125 cm × 42 cm	Klimt Foundation Vienna	
	The Kiss	1907–'08	Oil and gold leaf on canvas, 180 cm × 180 cm	Österreichische Galerie Belvedere	A perfect square, the canvas depicts a couple embracing, their bodies entwined in elaborate robes decorated in a style influenced by both linear constructs of the contemporary Art Nouveau style and the organic forms of the earlier Arts and Crafts Movement. The work is composed of conventional oil paint with applied layers of gold leaf, an aspect that gives it its strikingly modern, yet evocative appearance. The Kiss is widely considered a masterpiece of the early modern period. It is a symbol of Vienna Jugendstil (Viennese Art Nouveau), and is considered Klimt's most popular work.
	Hope II	1907–'08	Oil, gold, and platinum on canvas, 110.5 cm × 110.5 cm	Museum of Modern Art New York	
	Danaë	1907–'08	Oil on canvas, 77 cm x 83 cm	Private collection	Representation of the mythological daughter of King Acrisius of Argos and his wife Queen Eurydice. Danaë was a popular subject in the early 1900s for many artists; she was used as the quintessential symbol of divine love, and transcendence. While imprisoned by her father, King of Argos, in a tower of bronze, Danaë was visited by Zeus, symbolised here as the golden rain flowing between her legs. It is apparent from the subject's face and hands that she is aroused by the golden stream. In this work, she is curled in a sumptuous royal purple veil which refers to her imperial lineage. (Note: Sometime after her celestial visitation Danaë gave birth to a son, Perseus, who is cited later in Greek mythology for slaying the Gorgon Medusa and rescuing Andromeda.) Many early portrayals of Danaë were erotic; other paintings completed in similar style are Klimt's Medicine (1900– 1907), and Water Snakes (1904–'07).
	Sunflower or The Sunflower	1907/'08	Oil and gold leaf on canvas, 110 cm × 110 cm	Österreichische Galerie Belvedere	Klimt's Sunflower has repeatedly been interpreted as a humanoid figure. Art critic of the Vienna Secession, Lajos Hevesi, saw it as a "fairy in love." Others have considered this painting a hidden portrait of the designer Emilie Flöge.
	Blooming Meadow or Flowering Meadow	c. 1908	Oil on canvas, 110 cm × 110 cm	Private collection	
	Schloss by the Water (Schloss Kammer on the Attersee I) or Water Castle	1908–'09	Oil on canvas, 110 cm × 100 cm	National Gallery Prague	
	9 working drawings for Stoclet Frieze	1908-1911	Mixed media on paper	Museum of Applied Arts, Vienna	Including Expectation (Dancer), The Tree of Life, and Fulfillment.
	Schloss Kammer on the Attersee II	1909	Oil on canvas, 110 cm × 110 cm	Private collection	
	Lady With Hat and Feather Boa	1909	Oil on canvas, 69 cm × 55 cm	Private collection	
	Park at Kammer Castle	1909	Oil on canvas, 110 cm × 110 cm	Neue Galerie New York	
	Judith II (Salomé)	1909	Oil on canvas, 176 cm × 46 cm	Ca' Pesaro	
	The Park	1909–'10	Oil on canvas, 110.5 cm × 110.5 cm	Museum of Modern Art New York	One of Klimt's paintings closer to abstraction, but not quite embracing it in full. The multiplicity of colours and reedy forms of vegetation infuse a sense of vivaciousness that connects with Nature's life cycle. The focus is a close-up subject, as often occurs in Klimt's landscapes, whereas the execution is reminiscent of exquisite mosaics.
	Mother with Two Children (Family)	1909/'10	Oil on canvas, 90 cm × 90 cm	Österreichische Galerie Belvedere	
	Schloss Kammer on the Attersee III	1909/'10	Oil on canvas, 110 cm × 110 cm	Österreichische Galerie Belvedere	This painting shows the lake-facing façade of Kammer Castle. Klimt likely captured this view on canvas from the opposite shore using a telescope.

=== 1910s ===
Image	Title	Year	Medium	Location	Notes
	The Black Feathered Hat or Lady with Feather Hat	1910	Oil on canvas, 79 cm × 63 cm	Private collection	The red hair and the disproportionate hat were already present in Klimt's Lady with Hat and Feather Boa (1909). The unfinished style, unusual for the Austrian artist, seems to recall that of Henri de Toulouse-Lautrec, whose work was seen by Klimt in Paris the previous year: this is echoed by the synthesis of the image, lacking any decorative support, and its low tones.
	Schloss Kammer on the Attersee IV	1910	Oil on canvas, 110 cm × 110 cm	Private collection	
	Death and Life or Death and Love	1908/'10, alteration in 1915	Oil on canvas, 180.8 cm × 200.6 cm	Leopold Museum	First painted in 1910, Klimt decided to fundamentally revise the work in 1915. The marked rupture cutting this composition in two parts represents several symbolic motifs: the disquieting and dark image of Death looms over the entangled group of the human bodies, where colour retrieves its decorative vividness. The ascending structure narrates life's salient motifs: from friendship to love, to maternity. The man's brawny physique will inspire Egon Schiele's nudes.
	Upper Austrian Farmhouse or Farmhouse in Upper Austria	1911	Oil on canvas, 110 cm × 110 cm	Österreichische Galerie Belvedere	The influence of both van Gogh and Toulouse-Lautrec can be seen in this painting through his brushwork and contrasting of textures.
	Farm Garden (or Cottage Garden) with Crucifix or Country Garden with Cavalry	1911–'12	Oil on canvas, 110 cm × 110 cm	N/A	Destroyed by fire in 1945
	Apple Tree I	c. 1912	Oil on canvas, 109 cm × 110 cm	Private collection	Part of the Republic of Austria v. Altmann court case.
	Avenue to Schloss Kammer or Avenue in Front of Kammer Castle	1912	Oil on canvas, 110 cm × 110 cm	Österreichische Galerie Belvedere	
	Portrait of Adele Bloch-Bauer II	1912	Oil on canvas, 190 cm × 120 cm	Private collection	Part of the Republic of Austria v. Altmann court case.
	Miss Ria Munk on her Deathbed	1912	Oil on canvas, 50 cm × 50.5 cm	Private collection	
	Orchard with Roses or Rose Garden	1912	Oil on canvas, 110 cm × 110 cm	Private collection	
	Mäda Primavesi	1912–'13	Oil on canvas, 149.9 cm × 110.5 cm	Metropolitan Museum of Art	
	The Maiden or The Virgin	1913	Oil on canvas, 190 cm × 200 cm	National Gallery Prague	To his usual depiction of aristocracy, Klimt now substitutes erotic allegories, as for Death and Life. Here the entanglement of women has lost any realism, as is apparent in the almost skeletal nude on the left, and thus it is absorbed in the decorative scheme. The association of beauty with such unnatural poses, indicates an allusion to life's ephemerality, a reflection of modern society.
	Italian Garden Landscape or Italian Garden	1913	Oil on canvas, 110 cm × 110 cm	Zug Art Museum	In July and August 1913, Klimt spent 15 days with friends at Lake Garda in Italy, where he painted the work in the gardens of the hotel Albergo Morandi.
	Malcesine on Lake Garda	1913	Oil on canvas, 110 cm × 110 cm	Unknown	Lost since 1945.
	Church in Cassone (Landscape with Cypresses)	1913	Oil on canvas, 110 cm × 110 cm	Private collection	
	Portrait of Eugenia Primavesi	1913–'14	Oil on canvas, 140 cm × 85 cm	Toyota Municipal Museum of Art	Eugenia Primavesi was wife to Austrian industrialist Otto Primavesi and she strongly influenced his artistic commissions.
	Forester's House in Weissenbach I	1914	Oil on canvas, 110 cm × 110 cm	Österreichische Galerie Belvedere	On permanent loan from a private collection.
	Forester’s House in Weissenbach II (Garden)	1914	Oil on canvas, 110 cm × 110 cm	Neue Galerie New York	
	Litzlberg on Lake Attersee	1915	Oil on canvas, 110 cm × 110 cm	Private collection	
	Litzlbergkeller	1915/'16	Oil on canvas, 110 cm × 110 cm	Leopold Museum	Close-up view of the restaurant “Litzlberger Keller”. The painting was commissioned by Otto Primavesi.
	Portrait of Elisabeth Lederer or Portrait of Elisabeth Bachofen-Echt	1916	Oil on canvas, 180 cm × 126 cm	Private collection	Klimt began painting this work in 1914. An oriental note dominates in the figurines framing the Baroness. To the pyramidal structure of the subject is accompanied an abstract and serrated syntax, typical of Klimt's last output. Having concluded his "golden phase" since 1909, and overcome the subsequent crisis, the artist rejects Greek or Egyptian modules and concentrates on a joyful chromatic vibrancy, close to Matisse.
	Portrait of Friederike-Maria Beer	1916	Oil on canvas, 168 cm × 130 cm	Tel Aviv Museum of Art	This woman, daughter of the Kaiserbar's owner, was also portrayed by Egon Schiele. Klimt portrays her in a dress made by the Wiener Werkstätte. In order to emphasise its pompous style, he replicates the oriental elements of the Baroness Elisabeth Lederer, taken from a Korean vase. The three colours at the top right – red, white, and black – allude to the Austrian flag and the outbreak of World War I.
(black & white image)	Wally (Portrait of a young girl with exposed breast) or Portrait of Wally	1916	Oil on canvas, 110 cm × 110 cm	N/A	Destroyed by fire in 1945
	Garden Path with Chickens (Garden with Mallows and Chickens)	1916	Oil on canvas, 110 cm × 110 cm	N/A	Destroyed by fire in 1945
	Apple Tree II	1916	Oil on canvas, 80 cm × 80 cm	Private collection	See main article for provenance controversy
	Houses in Unterach on Lake Attersee	1916	Oil on canvas, 110 cm × 110 cm	Private collection	Part of the Republic of Austria v. Altmann court case. The painting was originally owned by Adele and Ferdinand Bloch-Bauer. It depicts the place where Klimt spent much time during World War I.
	Forest Slope in Unterach on the Attersee	1916	Oil on canvas, 110 cm × 110 cm	Private collection	
	Garden Landscape with Mountain Top (Parish Garden)	1916	Oil on canvas, 110 cm × 110 cm	Zug Art Museum	
	Schönbrunn Landscape or Park of Schönbrunn	1916	Oil on canvas, 110 cm × 110 cm	Private collection	
	Church in Unterach on Lake Attersee	c. 1916	Oil on canvas, 110 cm × 110 cm	Private collection	Klimt painted this view from the village of Weissenbach, using binoculars to look over Lake Attersee. In this work, Klimt abandons perspective, instead favouring shape, texture and colour.
	Lady with a Muff	1916–'17	Oil on canvas, 50 cm × 50 cm	Private collection	The painting was long considered lost after being last exhibited in Vienna in 1926. It had been held in a private Czech collection since the 1930s, and in 2014 the owner agreed to loan it to the National Gallery Prague for temporary exhibition.
	Women Friends	1916–'17	Oil on canvas, c. 99 cm × 99 cm	N/A	The painting was destroyed by fire of retreating German forces in 1945. Only studies and photographs remain.
	Portrait of a Lady	1916–'17	Oil on canvas, 60 cm × 55 cm	Galleria d'arte moderna Ricci Oddi	Rendered in a brisk and vivacious style, the portrait is pervaded by a serene spirit, unusual for Klimt. Here he alters the face's realism with bright colour daubes, thus reaching an expressionist style, especially close to Jawlensky's images. However, to the lumpy and violent deformation of his colleagues' brush, Klimt opposes his usual ornamental finery.
	The Dancer	1916–'17	Oil on canvas, 180 cm × 90 cm	Private collection	Unfinished. The painting may be a reworked version of Klimt's second attempt at painting a posthumous portrait of Ria Munk. It was the first Klimt painting to be exhibited in the United States in 1922 at the New York branch of the Wiener Werkstätte.
	Adam and Eve	1916–'18	Oil on canvas, 173 cm × 60 cm	Österreichische Galerie Belvedere	Unfinished. Eve is the main figure in the painting, with Adam in the background serving to contrast with her milky white skin. It takes a symbolic significance for its biblical subject as well as Eve's facial rendering, with her reclined head and a sweet yet enigmatic smile. The lower section, with its flowers and background decorativism, is typical of Klimt; the upper section, where the figures are contra-posed to a monochrome backdrop, reveals a synthesis of strained lines closer to Schiele's style.
	Leda with the Swan	1917	Oil on canvas, 99 cm × 99 cm	N/A	Destroyed by fire in 1945
(black & white image)	Gastein	1917	Oil on canvas, 70 cm × 70 cm	Unknown	Lost since 1945.
	Portrait of Fräulein Lieser	1917	Oil on canvas, 140 cm × 80 cm	Private collection	For decades, the painting was only known from a black and white photograph, and was considered lost by experts. It was identified in a private collection in 2024. It was sold at auction for €30 M later that year.
	Head of a Woman	1917	Oil on canvas, 67 cm × 56 cm	Lentos Art Museum	Unfinished. The sitter is unknown.
(black & white image)	Portrait of Barbara Flöge	1917/'18	Oil on canvas, 110 cm × 110 cm	Private collection	
	Johanna Staude	1917/'18	Oil on canvas, 70 cm × 50 cm	Österreichische Galerie Belvedere	Unfinished. Another portrait, where Klimt concentrates on the body upper half, with an harlequin blue motif of leaves in the dress.
	Lady with a Fan	1917/'18	Oil on canvas, 100 cm × 100 cm	Private collection	One of Klimt's last finished works.
	Lady in White	1917/'18	Oil on canvas, 70 cm × 70 cm	Österreichische Galerie Belvedere	Unfinished.
	The Bride	1917/'18	Oil on canvas, 165 cm × 191 cm	Österreichische Galerie Belvedere	Unfinished. When Klimt died, this painting was left unfinished and leaning against the easel in his studio. It shows clearly Klimt's working method with preliminary sketches still visible, while in other places motifs are already fully developed.
	Amalie Zuckerkandl	1917/'18, possibly begun as early as 1913/'14	Oil on canvas, 128 cm × 128 cm	Österreichische Galerie Belvedere	Unfinished.
	Posthumous Portrait of Ria Munk III	1917/'18	Oil on canvas, 178.1 cm × 89.9 cm	Private collection	Unfinished.
	Baby (Cradle)	1917/'18	Oil on canvas, 110.9 x 110.4 cm	National Gallery of Art, Washington, D.C.	Unfinished, left in studio with The Bride.

== See also ==
- Stoclet Frieze, a series of murals created by Klimt for a 1905–'11 commission in the Stoclet Palace, Brussels

== Bibliography ==
- Armiraglio, Federica (2008), Klimt, Skira, ISBN 978-8-8613-0893-0.
- Bäumer, Angelica (1986), Gustav Klimt: Women, translated by Osers, Ewald, London: Weidenfeld & Nicolson, ISBN 9780297794103.
- Dobai, Johannes (1988), Gustav Klimt: Landscapes, translated by Osers, Ewald (1st ed.), Weidenfeld & Nicolson, ISBN 9780297793854.
- Fliedl, Gottfried (1994), Gustav Klimt 1862–1918 The World in Female Form, Benedikt Taschen.
- Whitford, Frank (1990), Klimt, Thames and Hudson, ISBN 9780500202463.
- Hodge, Susie (2014), Gustav Klimt: Masterpieces of Art, Fulham, London: Flame Tree Publishing, ISBN 978-1-80417-706-8.
- Kinsella, Eileen (January 2007), "Gold Rush", ARTnews.
- Natter, Tobias G., ed. (2018), Gustav Klimt: drawings & paintings, Bibliotheca universalis, Cologne, Germany: Taschen, ISBN 978-3-8365-6290-4.
- O'Connor, Anne-Marie (2012), The Lady in Gold: The Extraordinary Tale of Gustav Klimt's Masterpiece, Portrait of Adele Bloch-Bauer, New York: Alfred A. Knopf, ISBN 978-0307265647.
- Sabarsky, Serge (1983), Gustav Klimt: Drawings, et al, Moyer Bell, ISBN 978-0-918825-19-3.
