= Pallas Athena (Klimt) =

1898 painting by Gustav Klimt

- German: Pallas Athene
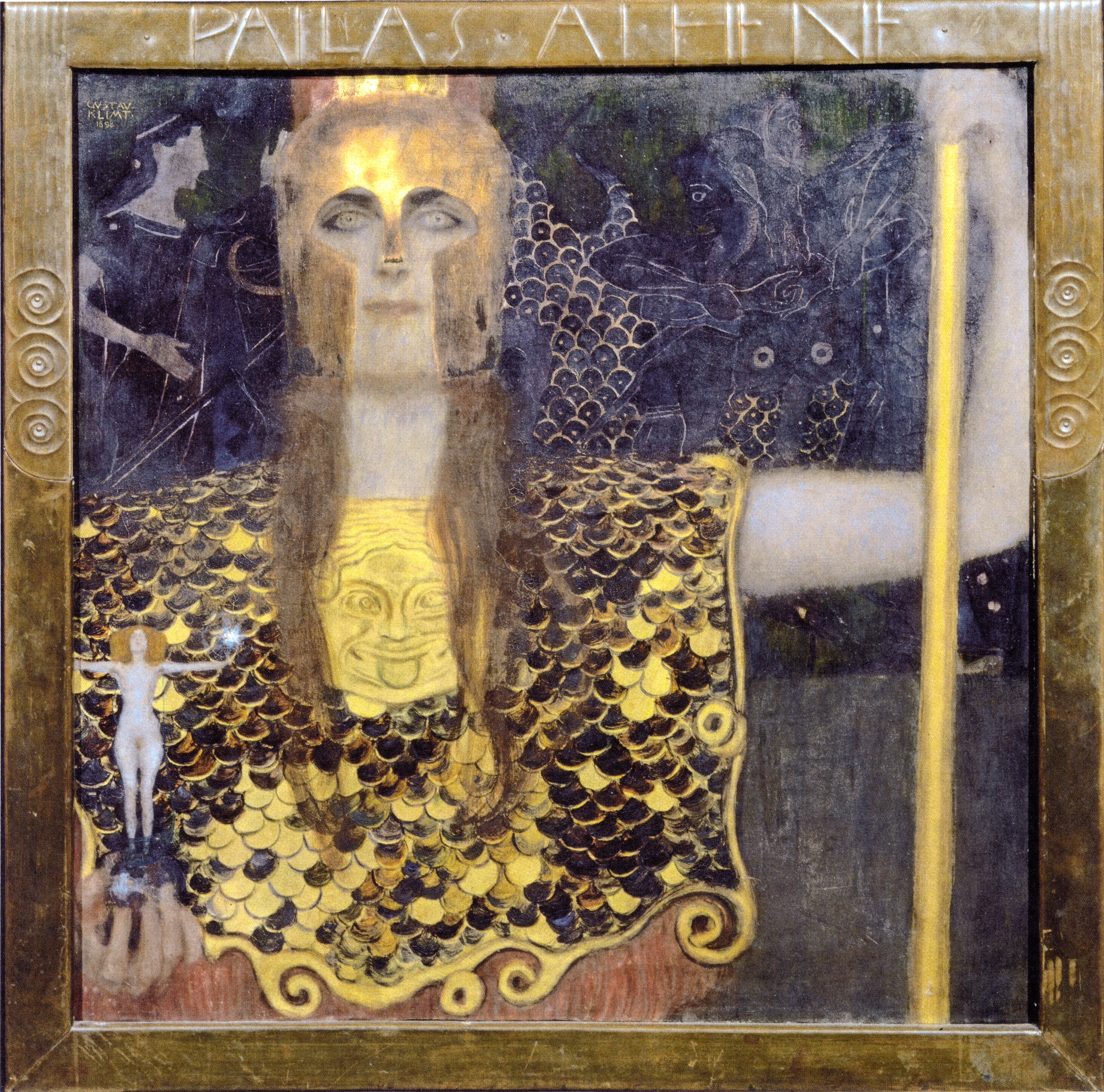
- Artist: Gustav Klimt
- Year: 1898
- Medium: Oil on canvas
- Movement: Vienna Secession
- Subject: Athena
- Dimensions: 75 cm × 75 cm (30 in × 30 in)
- Location: Vienna Museum, Vienna

Pallas Athena (German: Pallas Athene) is an oil painting created by Austrian painter Gustav Klimt in 1898. It depicts Athena, the goddess of wisdom and war in ancient Greek mythology. It is often considered to be the earliest piece from Klimt's golden phase and a key symbol of the Vienna Secession. The painting is held in the Vienna Museum.

== Description ==
Pallas Athena depicts Athena, the ancient Greek goddess of wisdom, crafts, and war as well as the guardian of ancient Athens. She stands in a defiant pose, wearing a golden helmet and breastplate, and holding her signature spear. Athena gazes steadily towards the viewer with wide, calm eyes, while her tightly drawn mouth emphasises her strong, straight jawline. These features lend her distinctly masculine appearance. This gender ambiguity aligns with ancient descriptions and depictions of Athena and is also common throughout ancient Greek culture. Unlike much of Klimt's later work, such as Judith I (1901), Danaë (1907) and The Kiss (1907–1908) which positively focus on sexuality, Pallas Athena notably lacks such eroticism. Instead, Klimt chooses to focus on Athena's divine and powerful nature.

In Pallas Athena, in the goddess' right hand a traditional figure of Nike is replaced by a nude figure embodying Nuda Veritas, or "naked truth", holding a mirror. This emphasises Klimt's portrayal of Athena as a symbol of freedom, strength and victory. Klimt would revisit the figure of Nuda Veritas in a 1899 painting of the same name, further representing Secessionist ideals expressed in Pallas Athena. Athena’s breastplate features an archaic-style Medusa head with a protruding tongue, a detail that some interpreters view as ridiculing opponents of the Secession movement. The background of Pallas Athena painting exhibits Heracles fighting with Triton. For this scene, Klimt was inspired by a black-figure vase, now in the Toledo Museum of Art in Toledo, Ohio. The painting's frame, designed by Klimt, was created by his younger brother Georg, an engraver and metal worker.

Pallas Athena exhibits Klimt's shift away from traditional historical painting, as he combines the human body with patterns of scales, spirals and waves. Rather than adhering to a strictly figurative representation, Klimt opts for a more stylised approach. With its bold use of gold leaf, the painting is often considered as the earliest piece from Klimt's 'golden phase', which continued until 1909. The painting shares stylistic similarities with the work of Franz von Stuck, a leading figure of the Munich Secession. Like Klimt, Stuck portrayed Athena and other Greek subjects. Due to their comparable artistic styles and similar careers in their respective cities, the two artists were inevitably compared by their contemporaries.

== Influences ==
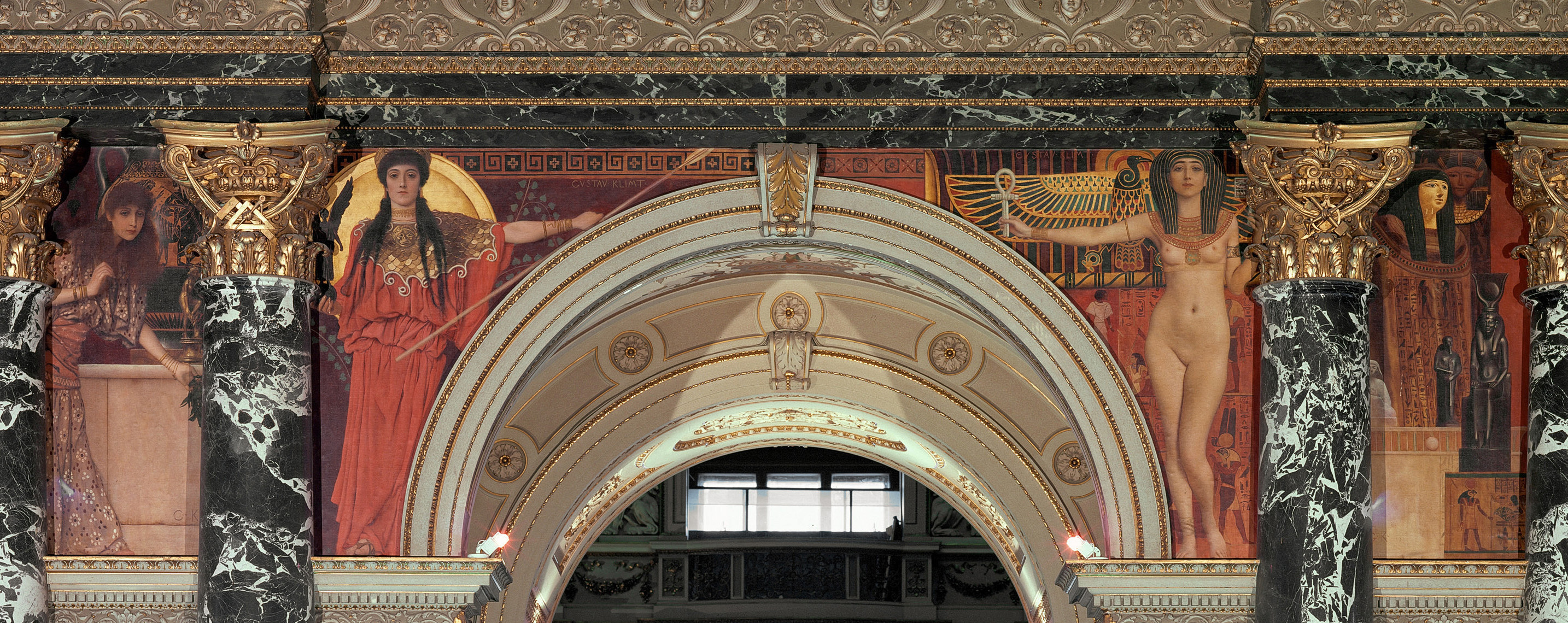
Klimt's depiction of Athena in the Kunsthistorisches Museum (second figure from left)

Klimt had depicted Athena twice before creating Pallas Athena. Klimt first depicted her in a spandrel of a pillar in the Kunsthistorisches Museum. In this depiction, Athena is presented with her typical Nike and spear, reminiscent of the statue Athena Parthenos. Klimt positions Athena amidst grapevines and a nude figure, creating a more sexualised representation of the goddess. The second depiction, more abstract and stylised, featured on the poster for the first Vienna Secession exhibition. Here she watches over the battle between Theseus and the Minotaur, symbolising the Secession's break from the Vienna Künstlerhaus and presenting Athena as "liberator of the arts". In Pallas Athena, Athena is depicted as victory personified, detached from the fighting in the painting's background, instead standing proud and divine. Compared to Klimt's earlier representations of Athena, her military and aloof appearance is striking.

== Reception and history ==
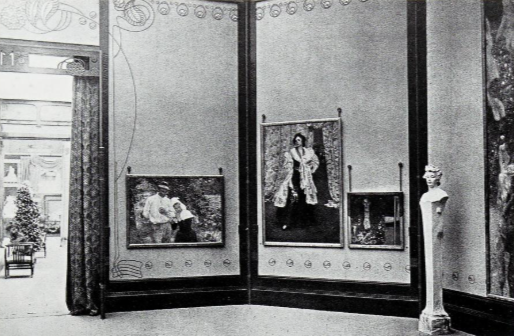
Austrian art at the 1900 Paris Exposition, Pallas Athena is displayed centre-right

Pallas Athena was first exhibited in the second exhibition of the Vienna Secession in November 1898. It was later shown in London in 1899 at the second exhibition of the International Society of Sculptors, Painters and Gravers and at the 1900 Paris Exposition. Some contemporary audiences were shocked by Athena’s modern portrayal, as reported by the art magazine Kunst und Kunsthandwerk. One critic described Klimt as being "overcome by affectation in his fantasy of Moving Water, which becomes even worse in Silence and reaches its peak in Pallas Athene". While the painting was partially met with a lack of understanding, critic Ludwig Hevesi praised it as "a Pallas of today, of her time, of her place, and of her creator", expressing hope that the painting would make it into a public collection. The painting became a key symbol of the Vienna Secession movement and was a way for Klimt to energise the ongoing artistic rebellion.

The first owner of Pallas Athena was Fritz Waerndorfer, a prominent Austrian entrepreneur and patron of the arts. After passing through the hands of two other private owners, the painting was acquired on behalf of the city of Vienna by Franz Glück in 1954. The artwork was then housed in the Vienna Museum on Karlsplatz, which opened in 1959. It remains there today.

== See also ==
- List of paintings by Gustav Klimt
