= Pear Tree (Klimt) =

1903 painting by Gustav Klimt

- Birnbaum (German)
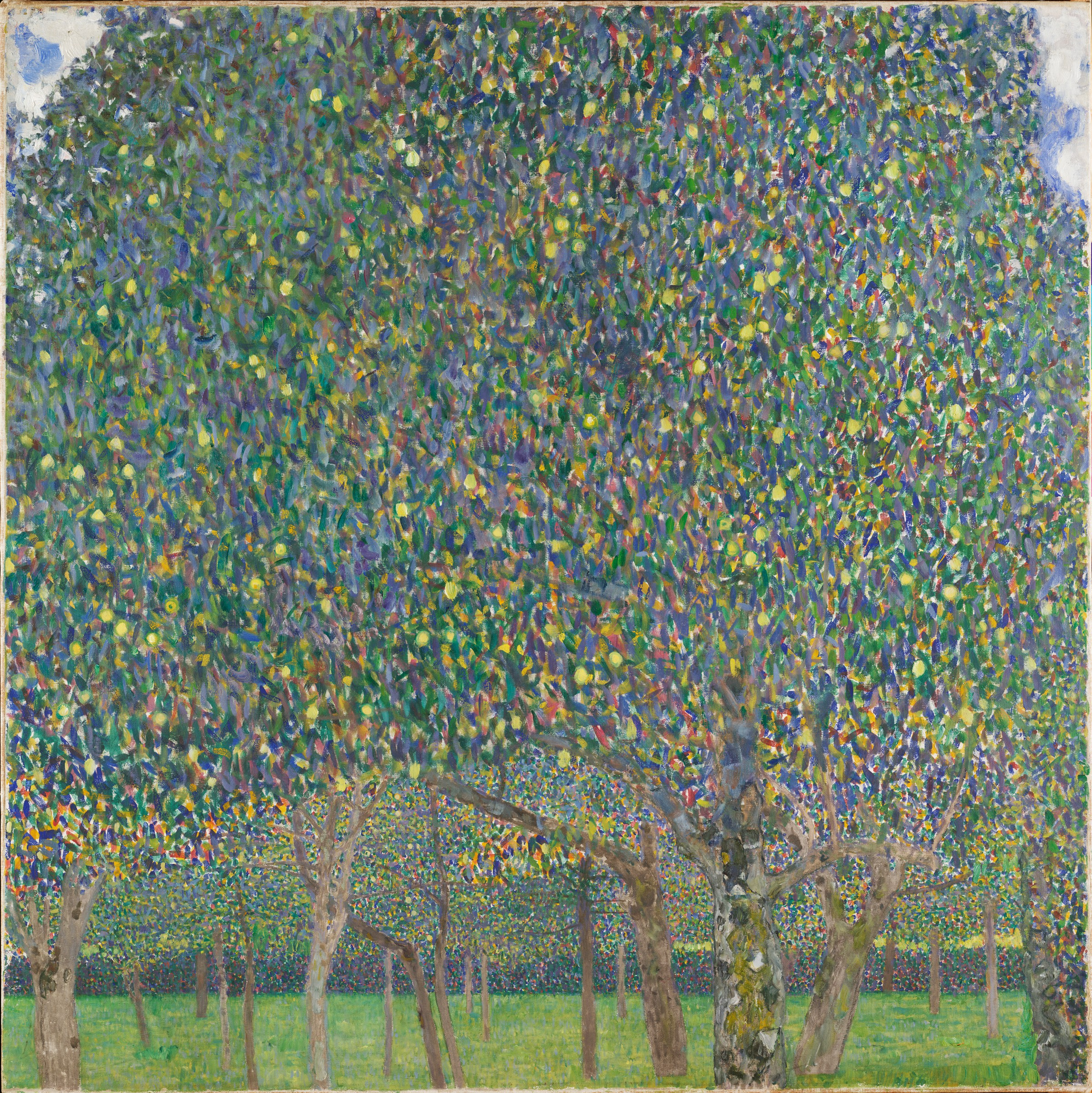
- Artist: Gustav Klimt
- Year: 1903
- Medium: Oil and casein on canvas
- Dimensions: 101 cm × 101 cm (40 in × 40 in)
- Location: Busch–Reisinger Museum, Cambridge, Massachusetts, United States

Pear Tree (German: Birnbaum) or Pear Trees is an oil painting on canvas by Austrian artist Gustav Klimt, painted in 1903. It depicts a pear tree in full bloom and was probably begun during Klimt's stay at Lake Attersee before being completed in Vienna for exhibition later that year. It is now housed in the Busch-Reisinger Museum, one of the Harvard Art Museums in Massachusetts.

== Background ==
Pointillism influenced Klimt's painting style around the turn of the twentieth century, as seen in Farmhouse and Fruit Trees (both 1901). At the time, Klimt was particularly receptive to new artistic influences, which he incorporated into his own personal style. While up to 1902 his work retained a strong attachment to landscape through its organic forms and atmospheric treatment, it became increasingly detached from direct observation, holding objects at greater distance and depicting them more abstractly. Klimt may have seen reproductions of Claude Monet's work by 1900, and at the 1903 Vienna Secession exhibition he directly encountered paintings by Paul Cézanne, Monet, Georges Seurat, Paul Gauguin and Vincent van Gogh. Pear Tree was among the first of Klimt’s landscapes in his Pointillist-influenced late style.

Pear Tree was probably begun in August 1903 during Klimt's stay at Litzlberg on Lake Attersee, before being completed at his studio in Vienna for inclusion in his November retrospective.

== Description ==
The composition is dominated by a pear tree in full bloom. Unlike the horizontal format traditionally associated with landscape painting, Pear Tree is executed on a square canvas. This has been attributed to the square viewfinder used by Klimt to select landscape subjects around the Attersee countryside. Individual dabs of paint represent leaves, blossoms and fruit within the tree. Branches fuse together to create a dense canopy, leaving the sky visible only in the upper corners of the canvas. The left side of the composition has a noticeably denser application of paint than the center or right, a feature attributed to Klimt's continued work on the painting after giving it to Emilie Louise Flöge in 1903. The painting's flat, flickering field of color recalls both post-impressionist painting and Byzantine mosaics. A distant hedge limits the view through the orchard.

According to Stephan Koja, the expansive foliage recalls the flat-patterned surfaces of Klimt's Golden Phase works, while the viewer's position beneath the trees creates the impression of looking into the orchard. He notes that in works such as Pear Tree and Roses Under Trees (1905), a "painted mosaic" increasingly spreads across the canvas in a "carpet-like structure". Karen Wilkin sees Pear Tree as anticipating several features of Klimt's later landscapes, including repetitive brushstrokes, an inventive range of greens, blues, and yellows, a square format, and an underlying geometric structure.

== History ==
Pear Tree was completed in time for Klimt's November 1903 retrospective at the 18th Exhibition of the Vienna Secession, which opened on November 14, 1903. Klimt gave the painting to his muse, Emilie Louise Flöge, in 1903, but continued to work on it thereafter, probably until his death. Contemporary art critic Ludwig Hevesi praised the painting's color effects, arguing that while drawing on Divisionism, Klimt had developed the style in his own independent way.

By 1933, the painting was in the collection of Otto Kallir's Neue Galerie in Vienna, which relocated to New York by 1940. In the summer of 1940, it featured in Kallir's Saved from Europe exhibition, along with Klimt's Portrait of a Lady (c. 1896 – c. 1898) and The Park (1909–1910). In 1956, Kallir donated the work to the Fogg Museum, one of the Harvard Art Museums, in Massachusetts. The painting is now housed in the Busch-Reisinger Museum, another of the Harvard Art Museums, where it remains on permanent display.

== See also ==
- List of paintings by Gustav Klimt
