= Wilhelm Müller-Hofmann =

Austrian painter (1885–1948)

Wilhelm Müller-Hofmann (5 April 1885, Brünn – 2 September 1948, Vienna) was an artist and teacher at the Wiener Kunstgewerbeschule.

== Life and work ==
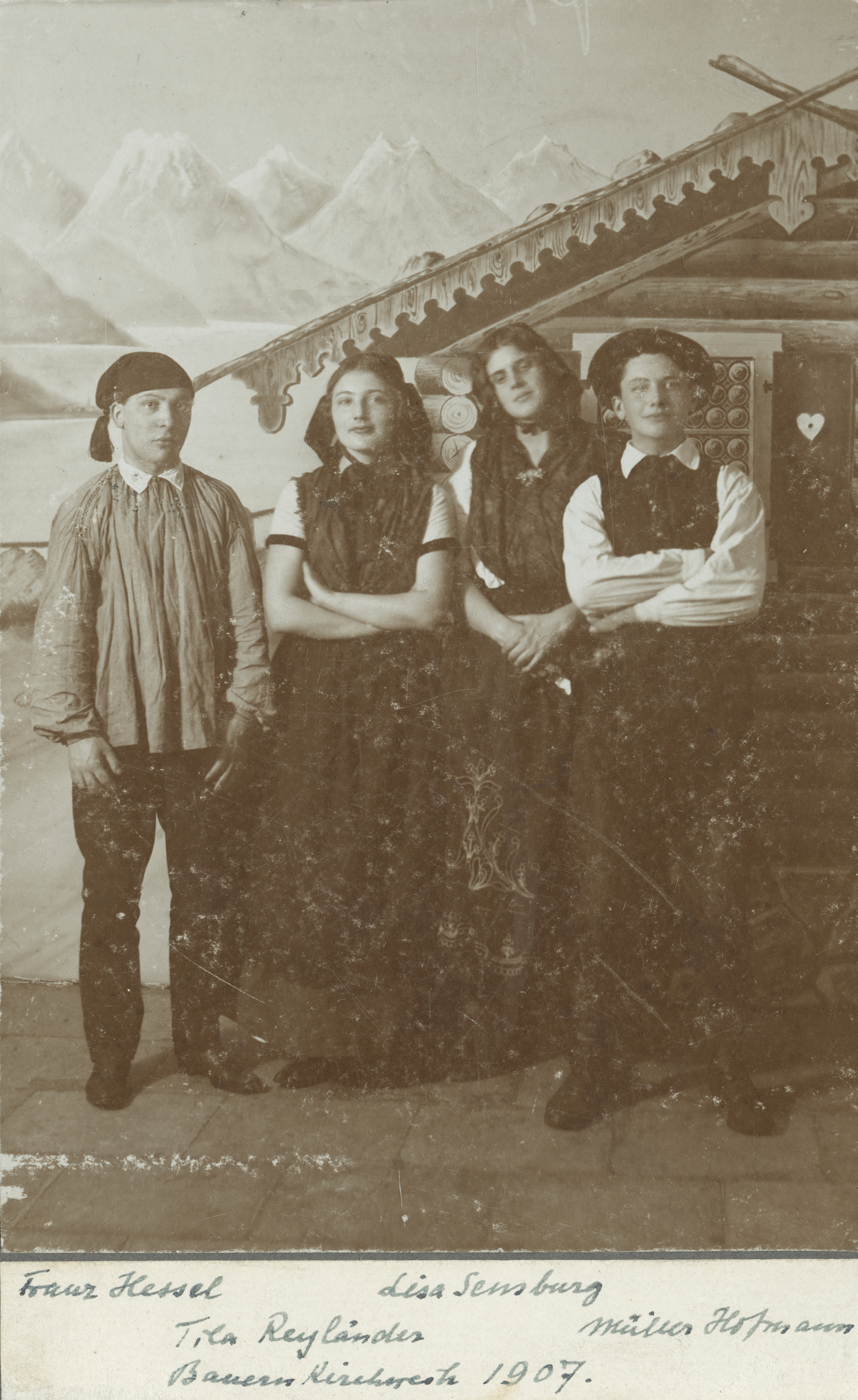
Wilhelm Müller-Hofmann with Ottilie Reylaender and Franz Hessel at a Munich artist celebration („Bauernkirchweih“), 1907

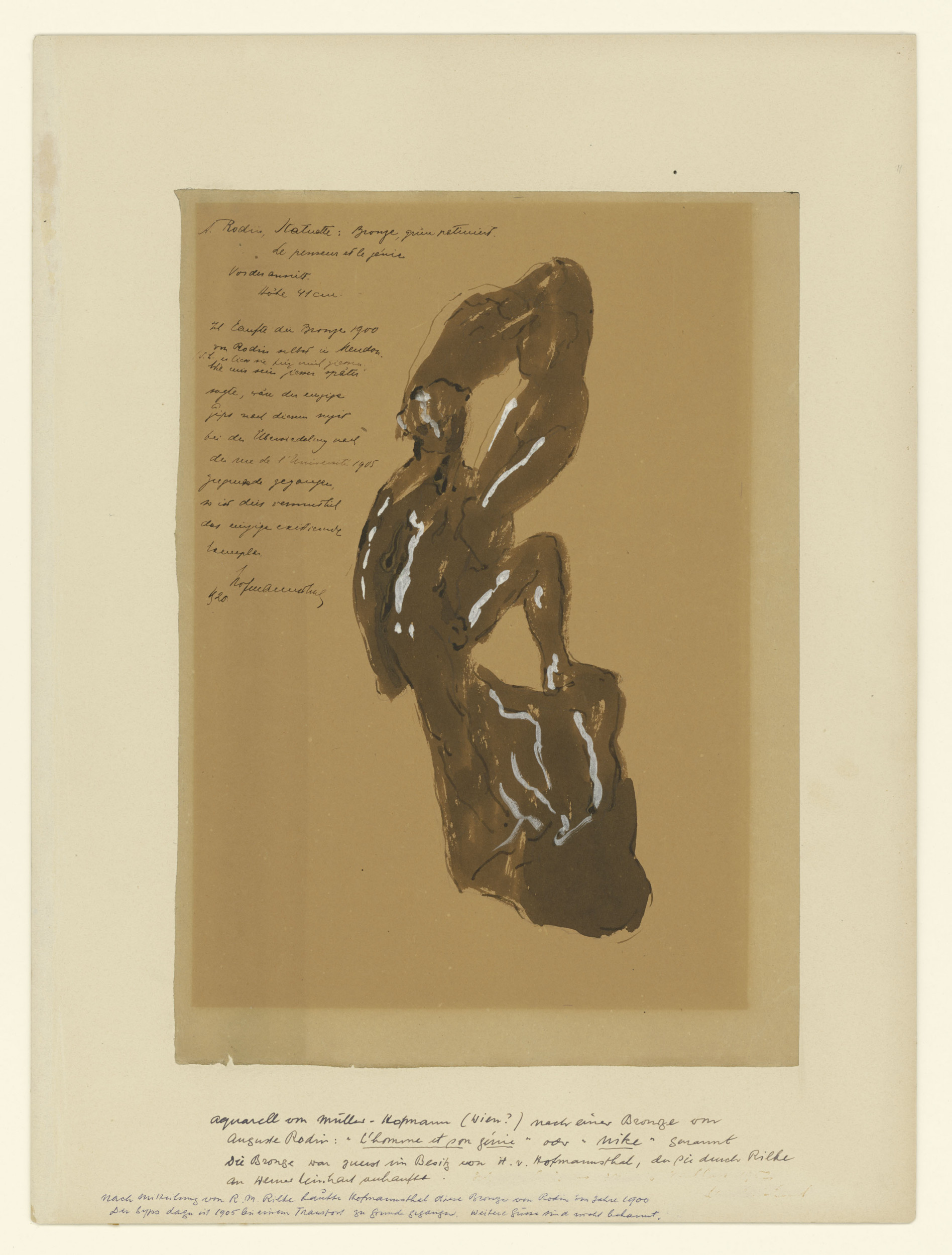
Drawing after Rodins Bronze Le penseur et le génie von 1889, (1920)

Born on 5 April 1885 and raised in Bavaria, Wilhelm Müller-Hofmann studied at the Academy of Fine Arts in Munich. In 1905/06, he completed his one-and-a-half-year military service in Bavaria.

He worked as a freelance portrait painter, theatrical painter, and illustrator. He married Eva Huch. During the First World War, he was continuously conscripted into the German army. In 1916, he was awarded the Iron Cross, Second Class. In 1919, he took over the directorship of the painting department at the Vienna School of Applied Arts. Wilhelm Müller-Hofmann was awarded the professional title of Professor. In November 1921, he divorced his wife but continued to pay alimony. On 12 April 1922 he married Hermine Zuckerkandl, daughter of Otto Zuckerkandl, the head physician at the Rothschild Hospital in Vienna, and his wife Amalie, by dispensation.

Müller-Hofmann's father-in-law, Otto Zuckerhandl, was Jewish, and his mother-in-law, Amalie, was a convert to Judaism. Their daughter, Hermine, owned a third of the Purkersdorf Sanatorium. Hermine Zuckerhandl and Wilhelm Müller-Hofmann had two sons, Viktor Carl Müller-Hofmann (born 24 May 1923) and Rudolf Immanuel Müller-Hofmann (born 12 February 1926).

== Nazi era ==
After Austria's Anschluss with Nazi Germany in March 1938 the Wilhelm Müller-Hofmann family was persecuted because of Hermine's Jewish heritage. Despite her conversion to Roman Catholicism, she was considered Jewish and their sons half-Jewish. On 30 November 1938 Müller-Hofmann, who was a Freemason, lost his position at the School of Applied Arts in March 1938 and was placed on "temporary leave" . Wilhelm and Hermine tried unsuccessfully to emigrate with their sons as a family. Failing this, in early 1939, they sent their sons Victor and Rudolf to safely in Sweden, while retreating to upper Bavaria where they lived until 1945.

Hermine Müller-Hofmann's mother, Amalie Zuckerkandl, her sister Eleonore (Nora) Stiasny, her brother in law, Paul Stiasny, and their son as well her aunt Amalie Redlich were all murdered by the Nazi regime.

== The Zuckerhandl and Stiasny art collections ==
In January 1940, Wilhelm Müller-Hofmann sold seven Japanese ukiyo-e prints, formerly owned by Amalie Zuckerkandl, to the State Museum of Applied Arts for 150 RM. In 1942, Klimt's portrait of Amalie Zuckerkandl was sold to the art historian and gallery owner Vita Künstler for 1600 RM. More than 60 years later, on 28 September 2007, the Austrian Advisory Commission recommended that these prints be restituted to the Müller-Hofmann heirs

Confusion over which Klimt paintings were in the Zuckerhandl/Stiasy collections has contributed to difficulties in restituting Nazi-looted art to the correct families.

== Postwar ==
Wilhelm and Hermine Müller-Hofmann returned to Vienna after the war and lived in the Belvedere. Their apartment had been looted and by Soviet troops. However, the painter was able to return to his former post at the renamed College of Applied Arts. Wilhelm Müller-Hofmann taught there until his early death in September 1948. He was buried in the Simmering Cemetery.

The Japanese prints were restituted to the heirs of Müller-Hofmann in 2009.

On 15 March 2021 the French Minister of Culture announce that the Klimt painting "Rosiers sous les arbres", would be restituted by Orsay Museum to Hermine Müller-Hofmann, as the heir of Holocaust victim Nora Stiasny.

In 2001, by mistake, the Belvedere in Vienna restituted a different painting of a tree, Apple Tree II, to Hermine Müller-Hofmann. In fact Apple Tree II had been owned by a different Viennese Jewish art collector, Elisabeth Bachofen-Echt, the daughter of Erich and Serena Lederer. By the time the error was discovered, Hermine Müller-Hofmann' nephew, Viktor Hoffmann, had already sold Klimt's Apple Tree II.

== Weblinks ==
- Wilhelm Müller-Hofmann, Eintrag im Lexikon der Österreichischen Provenienzforschung, verfasst von Leonhard Weidinger (2019)

== See also ==
List of Claims for Restitution of Nazi-looted art

The Holocaust in Austria
