= Insel im Attersee =

1901–1902 painting by Gustav Klimt

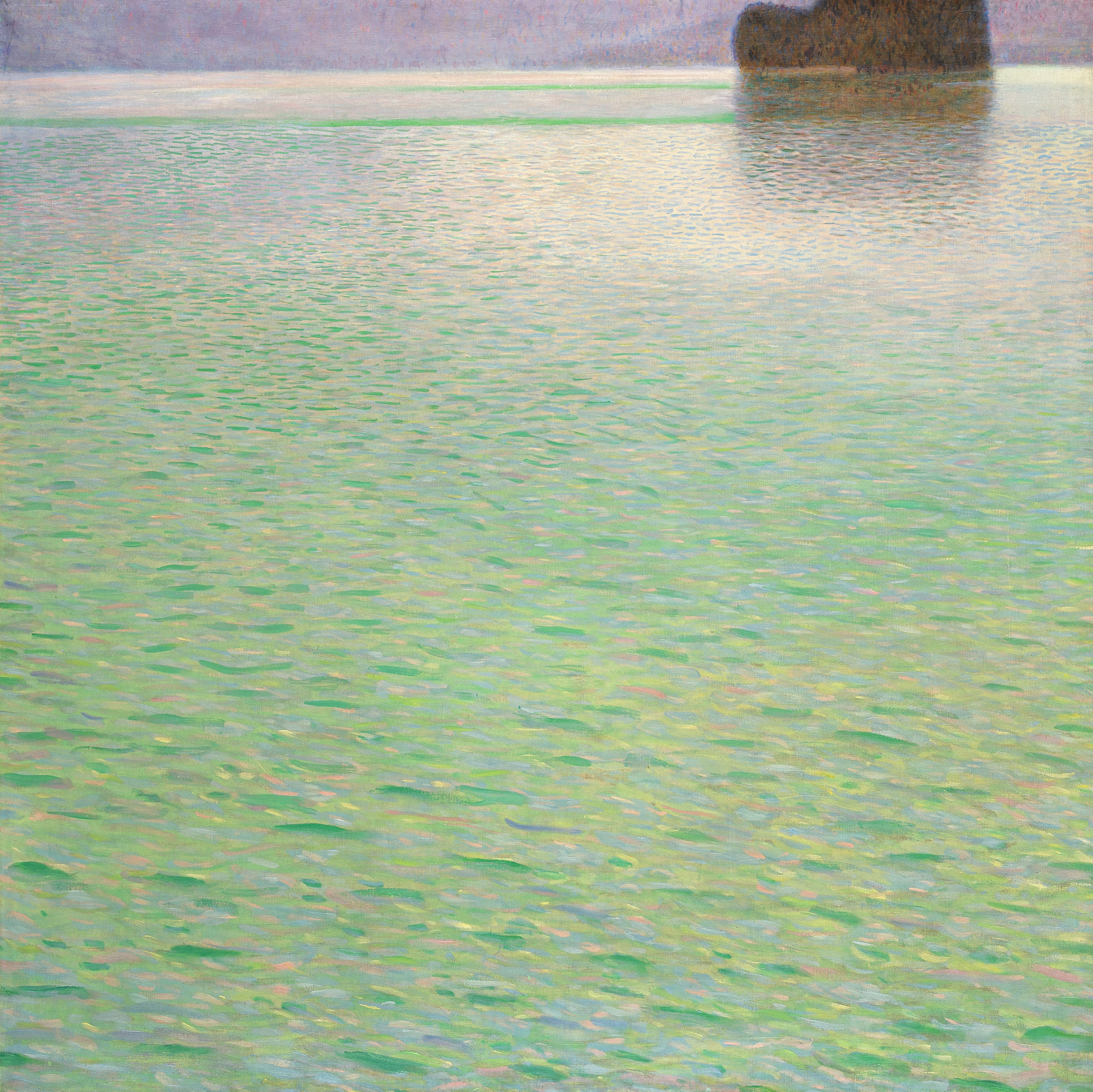
- Artist: Gustav Klimt
- Year: c. 1901–1902
- Medium: Oil on canvas
- Dimensions: 100.5 cm × 100.5 cm (39.6 in × 39.6 in)
- Location: Private collection

Insel im Attersee (English: Island in Lake Attersee) is a 1901–1902 landscape painting by the Austrian artist Gustav Klimt (1862–1918).

The work was created between 1901 and 1902 during Klimt’s summers on Lake Attersee. The painting is an early example of a work executed in the square format Klimt would come to be known for. Insel im Attersee was owned by Paul and Irene Hellmann, a Jewish couple who were persecuted by the Nazis. Irene and her son, Bernhard, were both murdered in the Holocaust, Irene in Auschwitz in 1944 and Bernhard in Sobibor in 1943.

In May of 2023 the painting sold for $53.2 million at Sotheby's in New York City. The work was sold from the collection of Otto Kallir who exhibited it in the landmark show Saved from Europe at his art venue Galerie St. Etienne in New York City in 1940. The work ostensibly introduced Klimt's work to a North American viewership.

From 1898 forward, Klimt spent his summers in the Salzkammergut region of Austria where Lake Attersee is located and it was here that he was able to paint en plein air for the first time.

This painting is one of two that Klimt did of the same view between 1900 and 1902, with the first work titled Attersee dating from 1900 now residing in the Leopold Museum in Vienna.

Comparisons of this work to paintings by the French Impressionist Claude Monet have been made in accordance of the two artists similarities in their handling of water.

== See also ==
- List of paintings by Gustav Klimt
