= The Maiden (Klimt) =

1913 painting by Gustav Klimt

The Maiden (The Virgins)
- Artist: Gustav Klimt
- Year: 1913
- Medium: oil paint, canvas
- Dimensions: 190.00 cm (74.80 in) × 200.00 cm (78.74 in)
- Collection: National Gallery Prague
- Accession no.: O 4152

The Maiden (German: Die Jungfrau) is a painting by the Austrian painter Gustav Klimt painted in 1913. The Maiden was one of Klimt's last paintings before he died. Currently it is stored in the National Gallery in Prague, Czech Republic.

== Description ==
The abundance of the flowers in the painting symbolizes the evolution into womanhood. The painting depicts the central figure in blue with six women that are interlacing surrounding her. Each woman represents a particular life stage. The painting touches on various topics of human life, such as love, sexuality and regeneration that are depicted in cyclical shape. The virgin's gown with its many spirals of blue and purple metaphorically indicates fertility, continual change and the evolution of the universe.

== See also ==
- List of paintings by Gustav Klimt
