= Schloss by the Water =

1908 painting by Gustav Klimt

Water Castle
- Year: 1900s
- Dimensions: 110 cm (43 in) × 100 cm (39 in)
- Accession no.: O 4103
- Identifiers: Bildindex der Kunst und Architektur ID: 20423742

Schloss by the Water or Schloss Kammer on the Attersee I (German: Schloss Kammer am Attersee I or Wasserschloss) is a 1908 oil on canvas painting by Gustav Klimt at display in the National Gallery Prague. It depicts a view of the Austrian Kammer Castle (Schloss Kammer) as seen from the Attersee.

== Description ==
While many sources describe the work as a square canvas, the National Gallery Prague gives its dimensions as approximately 110 cm × 100 cm.

It is the first of four oil on canvas paintings in a series created in 1908–'10 during a summer holiday at the Villa Oleander at Schörfling am Attersee. Klimt and the Flöge family rented the village from the Kammer Castle's owner, Countess Khevenhüller.

The work reflects a change in Klimt's painting, with a stronger composition than previously and the painting's strictly parallel structure. He chose a viewpoint from the quay by the villa, from which the Castle's cubic facade could be seen behind the lake's reflective surface through the tall pyramidal poplars. Using a self-invented cardboard 'viewfinder', a telescope and opera glasses, he also dissected the visible landscape into separate areas before rearranging them into separated planes of lake and shore – the church bell tower looks close to the Castle but is in reality about 800 metres away by water in Seewalchen. The lack of shadows, the horizon line right at the top of the painting, the reflection and the limited palette of white, ochre, and green, allowed him to flatten the image but still portray the landscape in a realistic-illusionistic fashion.

== Provenance ==
Reviews called it "the main and most brilliant work" at the 1909 Vienna Art Exhibition, where it was first exhibited. It was exhibited the following year at the Union of Czech-German Artists in Prague, from which it was acquired by its current owner, the National Gallery Prague.

== See also ==
- List of paintings by Gustav Klimt
