= Danaë (Rembrandt) =

1636 painting by Rembrandt

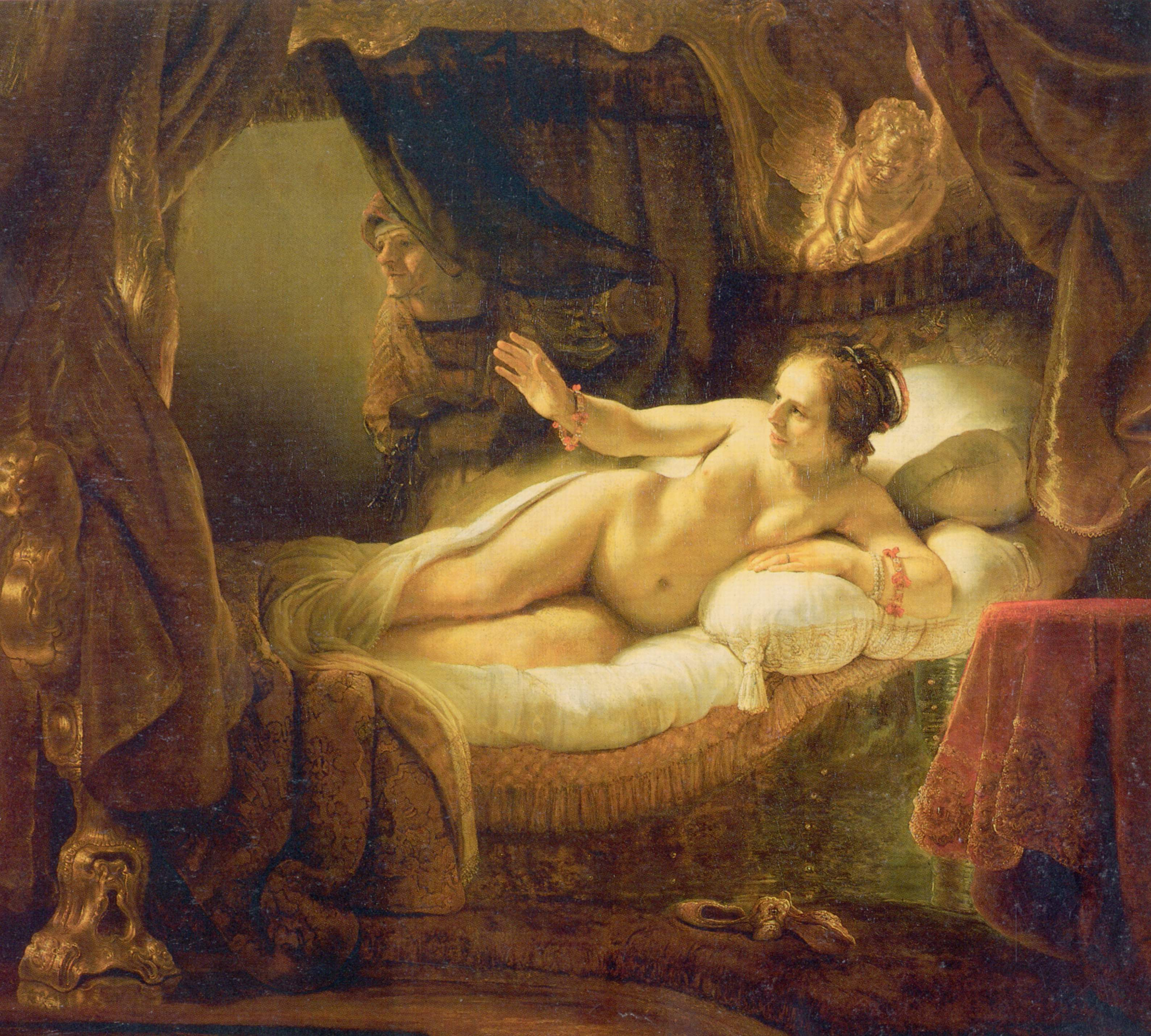
- Artist: Rembrandt
- Year: Finished c. 1636, but extensively reworked by 1643
- Medium: Oil on canvas
- Dimensions: 185 cm × 203 cm (73 in × 80 in)
- Location: Hermitage Museum, St. Petersburg

Danaë is a painting by the Dutch artist Rembrandt van Rijn. It was first completed in 1636, but Rembrandt reworked it significantly by 1643 at the latest. Once part of Pierre Crozat's collection, it has been in the Hermitage Museum, in St. Petersburg, Russia, since the 18th century.

It is a life-sized depiction of the character Danaë from Greek mythology, the mother of Perseus. She is presumably depicted as welcoming Zeus, who impregnated her in the form of a shower of gold. Given that this is one of Rembrandt's most magnificent paintings, it is not out of the question that he cherished it, but it also may have been difficult to sell because of the canvas' large size. Although the artist's wife Saskia was the original model for Danaë, Rembrandt later changed the figure's face to that of his mistress Geertje Dircx.

The reworking changed the positions of, among other things, the head, outstretched arm and legs of Danaë. The painting has been considerably cut down. It has a hard-to-read signature with a date ending in "6", but this may not be genuine. It was seriously vandalised in 1985, but has since been restored.

== Vandalism ==
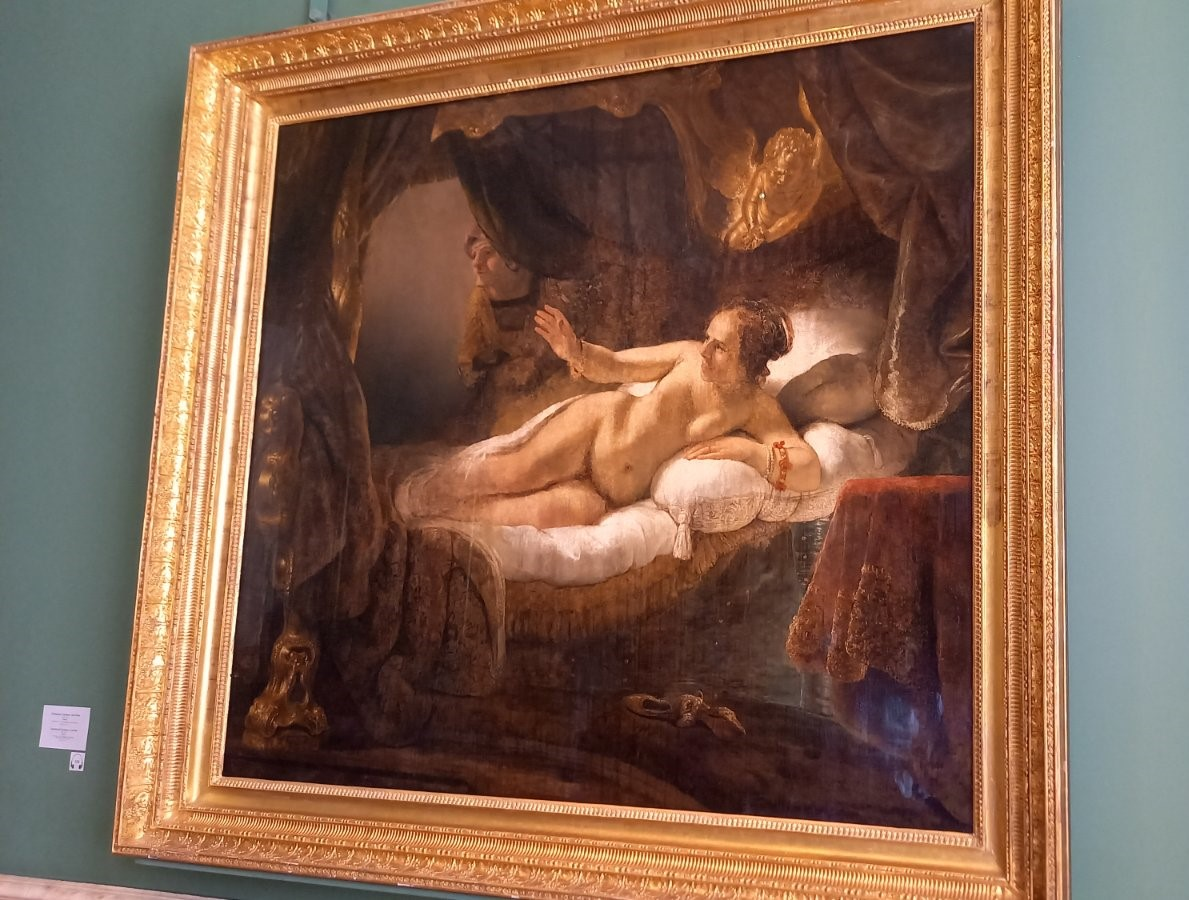
Danaë in 2021

On 15 June 1985, Rembrandt's painting was attacked by Bronius Maigys, a Soviet Lithuanian national later judged insane; he threw sulphuric acid on the canvas and cut it twice with his knife. The entire central part of the composition was turned into a mixture of spots with a conglomerate of splashes and areas of dripping paint. The worst damage was to the face and hair of Danaë, her right arm, and legs.

The process of restoring the painting began the same day. Following consultations with chemists, art restorers began washing the surface of the painting with water; they kept the painting in the vertical position, and sprayed water at the painting to prevent further degradation of the painting.

The restoration of the painting was accomplished between 1985 and 1997 by staff of the State Hermitage's Laboratory of Expert Restoration of Easel Paintings: Ye. N. Gerasimov (group leader), A. G. Rakhman, and G. A. Shirokov, with the participation of T. P. Alioshina in matters of scientific methodology.

In 2006, Bronius Maigys wrote a 300-page book in Russian, giving his version of events. According to Russian journalists who have read the manuscript, the author seeks the image of a martyr who fought for Lithuania's freedom, has no regrets, and would do the same again.

== See also ==
- List of paintings by Rembrandt
- Danaë (Correggio)
- Danaë (Klimt)
- Danaë (Titian series)
