= Irene and Paul Hellmann =

Austrian Jewish arts patrons

Irene Hellmann (née Redlich; November 3, 1882 – March 6, 1944) and Paul Hellmann (April 19, 1876 – December 9, 1938) were Jewish patrons of the arts from Austria.

== Life ==
=== Origin and social life ===
Irene Redlich was born on November 3, 1882 in Göding. Paul Hellmann was born on April 19, 1876 in Vienna. Both Irene Redlich and Paul Hellmann came from Jewish industrialist families who had risen into the Viennese upper middle class in the 19th century. The Moravian Redlich family was active in the sugar industry and brick production. Irene's brother was the lawyer and politician Josef Redlich. Paul Hellmann was a major industrialist as president of P. Hellmann AG für Textilindustrie. His uncle was Isidor Singer.

The couple married in 1901. They had three children: Bernhard (1903–1943), Ernst (1905–1980) and Ilse (1908–1998).

In 1910 the Hellmanns had been one of around 900 millionaires in Vienna.

The Hellmanns were friends with representatives of the Viennese art scene around the turn of the century - their contacts included Hugo von Hofmannsthal, Arthur Schnitzler, Gustav Mahler and Richard Strauss. The Hellmann couple's correspondence with Hugo von Hofmannsthal has been preserved; Hofmannsthal wrote to the Hellmanns a total of 67 times. Richard Strauss dedicated his Schlechtes Wetter (Opus 69, No. 5) and his Opus 66 to Irene Hellmann. Son Bernhard Hellmann was a close friend of Konrad Lorenz before he turned to National Socialism.

As was customary at the time, the Hellmanns' home was a meeting place for society. Poetry readings and house music evenings were held here regularly. Gustav Mahler's Lied von der Erde was premiered here in 1911. The salon furnishings were designed by Koloman Moser in 1904. Paul Hellmann owned three Stradivaris and played the violin himself. Hellmann was also an amateur photographer and took photographs of many of his acquaintances.

Paul Hellmann bought the Klimt painting The Blind Man for 4,000 crowns in 1917 and also owned Insel im Attersee (Island in the Attersee), both passing to Irene Hellmann after his death.

=== Salzburg Festival ===
Pau Hellmann played a major role in creating the Salzburg Festival, however this contribution was forgotten after the Nazi era.

=== Anschluss with Nazi Germany and Aryanization ===
When Austria merged with Nazi Germany in the Anschluss of 1938, the Hellmanns were persecuted by the Nazis because of their Jewish heritage. Paul Hellmann died in 1938 shortly after the "Anschluss". The Hellmanns' vacation home in Altaussee was "aryanized".

Irene Hellmann emigrated to the Netherlands to join her son. However after Nazi Germany invaded the Netherlands and anti-Jewish racial laws were adopted there, she had to go into hiding from the summer of 1940, changing addresses frequently. From rapidly changing addresses, Irene Hellmann wrote several letters to family members describing the life of the Jewish undesirables.

In the spring of 1943, their son Bernhard Hellmann was betrayed and taken to the Nazi camp of Sobibor, where he was killed on April 2, 1943 at the age of 39. Irene Hellmann was deported to Auschwitz on May 6, 1944 and murdered on the same day.

== Legacy ==
Like other Viennese upper-class families of Jewish origin, the Hellmanns disappeared from collective memory after the Nazis came to power. In 2021, the Jewish Museum Vienna presented the exhibition "Jedermanns Juden. 100 Years of the Salzburg Festival", which was also dedicated to the Hellmann couple.

In 2023, a Klimt painting that the Hellmanns had owned was auctioned at Sothebys. The sale of Insel im Attersee revived interest in the fate of the Hellmann's art collection, and Sothebys was criticized for initially omitting any information about Hellmann's murder by Nazis and then for including speculations about who might have owned the painting between Irene Hellmann and the art dealer Otto Kallir, as the versions published by the auction house changed numerous times in the weeks preceding the sale.

The heirs of Paul and Irene Hellmann have registered 29 artworks with the German Lost Art Foundation as Nazi-looted art that they are searching for, including artworks by Gustav Klimt, Ferdinand George Waldmüller, Rudolf von Alt, Heinrich Füger, Ferdinand Schmutzer, and Carl Moll.

== Publications ==
- Paul Hellmann: Mijn grote verwachtingen : herinneringen. Augustus, Amsterdam 2009, ISBN 978-90-457-0319-0.
- Paul Hellmann: Irene, mijn grootmoeder. De neergang van een Weens-Joodse familie. Uitgeverij Augustus, Amsterdam 2015, ISBN 978-90-450-2965-8

== See also ==
- The Holocaust in Austria
- Aryanization
- Gustav Klimt
