= Hope I =

1903 oil painting by Gustav Klimt

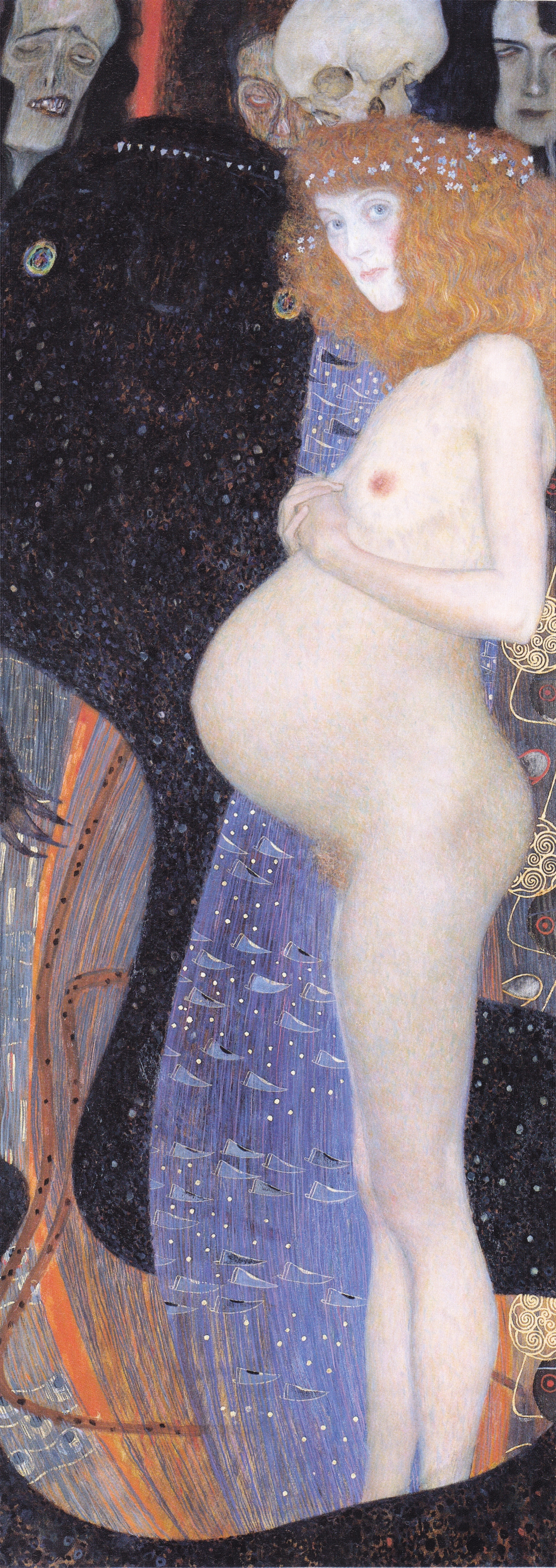
- Artist: Gustav Klimt
- Year: 1901
- Medium: Oil on canvas
- Dimensions: 189 cm × 67 cm (74 in × 26 in)
- Location: National Gallery of Canada, Ottawa

Hope I (in German, Die Hoffnung I) is an oil painting created by Gustav Klimt in 1903. It is 189 cm x 67 cm and currently located in the National Gallery of Canada, Ottawa. The main subject of this work is a pregnant, nude female. She is holding her hands together above her stomach and close to her chest. She gazes directly at the viewer and has a great mass of hair with a crown of forget-me-not flowers placed on her head. The scene is beautiful upon first glance but once the viewer's eyes move to the background, deathlike figures become noticeably present.

== History ==
=== Painting ===
In the years before this painting was made, it was uncommon to show pregnancy in art in Western art and Gustav Klimt was one of the first artists who blatantly portrayed a nude pregnant female in a powerful manner. Klimt did not show this work to the public until the Second Vienna Kunstschau in 1909. The themes present in this painting are contradictory, such as birth and death. The dark figures in the background swirl around the nude female seeming to blend the idea of life, death, and rebirth.

Not only does this painting show deathly figures in the background, but there also is a sea monster standing towards the left. The viewer can notice the monster's teeth along with its claw like hand that is located directly across from the woman's stomach and pelvic region. The sea monster has a large tail that wraps around the feet of the woman as if trying to capture her and continues out of the frame. Also, among the three sickly looking figures in the background, there is a skull located directly above the woman's head. This skull is attached to a blue body with varying shapes, lines, and colors. The skull represents death and decay while the three figures in the background symbolise disease, old age, and madness.

The skull behind the woman could be a reference to the art historical tradition of memento mori, which serves as a reminder that death is unavoidable. This tradition focuses on the idea that you can be thriving with life (such as the nude woman is) but tomorrow could bring the possibility of death. In Hope I the theme of life, death, and rebirth relate to the similar themes behind the tradition of memento mori. In art, memento mori is often represented by a skull, which we see present in the background of Hope I.

=== Model ===
The model for this painting was Herma, one of Gustav Klimt’s favorite models. Klimt described Herma as "having a backside more beautiful and more intelligent than the faces of many other models." Hope I was created unexpectedly; one day Herma was supposed to model for Klimt and did not show up. He became concerned and eventually sent someone to see if she was sick. The response that Klimt received was that Herma was not sick, but pregnant. Klimt demanded she come into work regardless of her being pregnant and upon seeing her he decided to make her the model for Hope I. It is believed that Klimt had sexual relations with nearly all his models. However, it is not known whether or not any of the pregnancies depicted in his paintings, such as Herma's, were his offspring.

== Personal life ==
This painting may be closer to Gustav Klimt's personal life than one might realize upon first glance. In 1902, a year before Hope I was painted, Klimt had a son, Otto Zimmermann, who died in infancy. The original sketch for the painting Hope I involved a pregnant female with a male next to her comforting her. The death of Klimt's son may have changed the theme of this painting to a memento mori motif. The man in the original sketch has been replaced by the skull figure in the final painting. There is scant documentation of Klimt's personal life, but much is known about his artistic career. Gustav Klimt was born in Austria in 1862 and at the age of fourteen received a grant to study at the Kunstgewerbeschule (The Vienna School of Art). In 1897 Klimt and his friends left the Cooperative Society of Austrian Artists and developed a new artistic movement called the Secession. He became the leader of this movement in Austria.

Klimt was an artist who broke with tradition in his depiction of nude figures. During this period Austrian artists were painting nude females, but these women often portrayed a great story or allegory and the artists covered their bodies with drapery. Klimt was unafraid to depict an exposed nude female without clothing or drapery covering her. The women he depicts, such as the woman in Hope I, have curly, out-of-control hair and he dares to depict their pubic hair as well. Bodily hair, especially pubic hair, was not seen as a beautiful physical trait in women, thus Klimt showed a new way of perceiving the nude female in art with Hope I.

== Controversies ==
This new style of Klimt's artwork that included nude, slender, seductive females created controversy between Klimt and the Austrians. They saw Klimt's paintings as sexual and scandalous and their conservative beliefs seemed to clash with what Klimt was trying to create with his artwork. Usually the women Klimt painted were shown as beautiful, powerful, and not subjective to their male partners. This "new woman" was a shock to the people of Austria but it is also one of the reasons Gustav Klimt became such a well-known, successful artist that made a great impact in the world of art history.

Klimt intended to exhibit Hope I in November 1903 at the Vienna Secession Exhibition. He withdrew the painting on the advice of the Minister for Culture and Education. In 1905, Klimt wrote, "at the Klimt exhibition two years ago the painting could not be shown; superior powers prevented it". Then during his interview with Berta Zuckerkandl, in April 1905, he declared "Since the unfortunate State Commission, everyone in Vienna has got into the habit of blaming Minister von Hartel for all my other works, and in the end the Minister for Education must have imagined that he really carried the full responsibility. People seem to think that I was prevented from showing a certain painting in my retrospective because it might shock people. I withdrew it because l did not want to cause embarrassment to the Secession, but l myself would have defended my work."

The painting was then exhibited in the second exhibition of the Deutscher Künstlerbund in 1905 in Berlin.

== See also ==
- List of paintings by Gustav Klimt
