= The Park (Klimt) =

1909–1910 painting by Gustav Klimt

- Der Park (German)
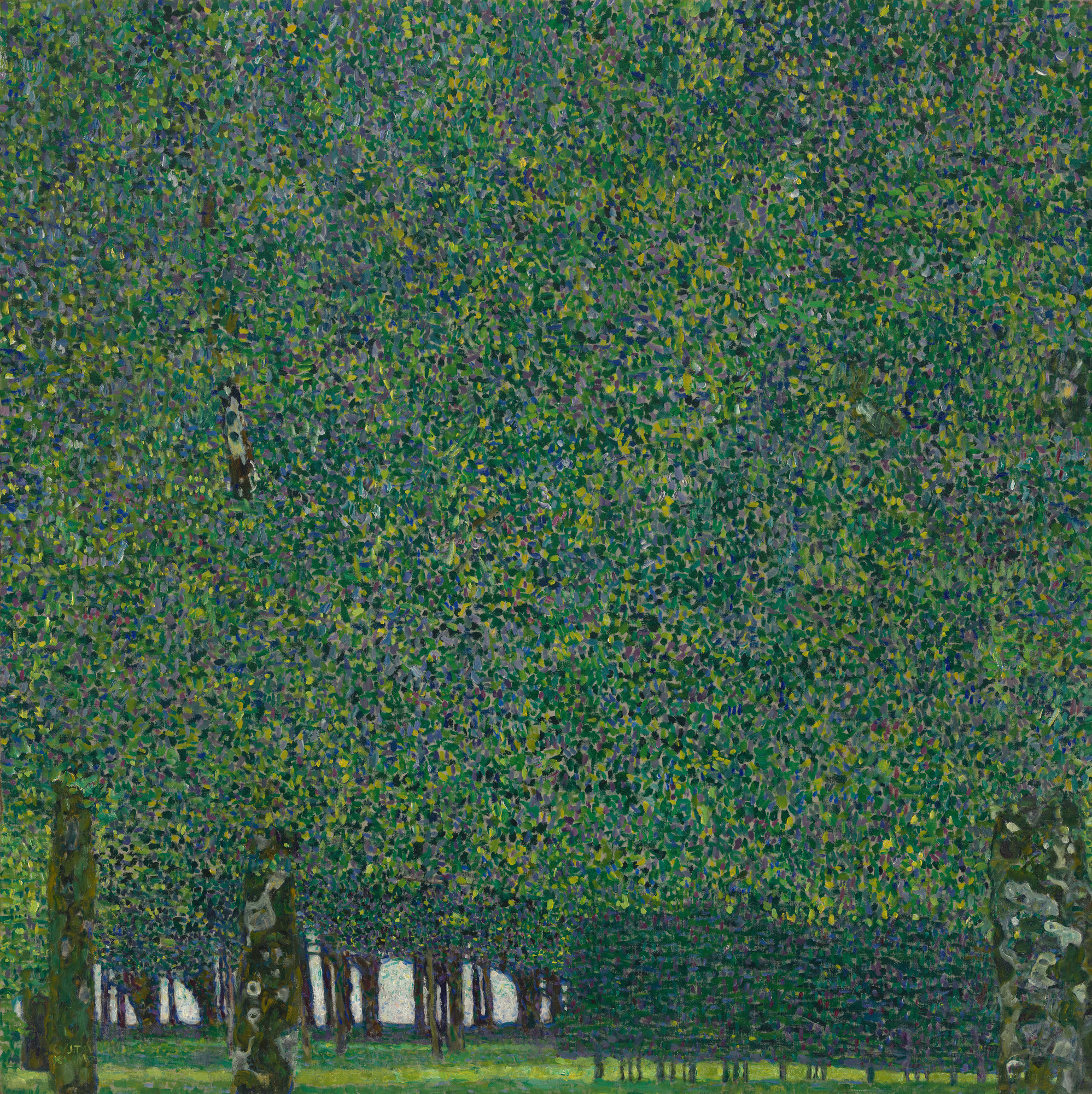
- Artist: Gustav Klimt
- Completion date: 1910
- Medium: Oil painting on canvas
- Movement: Symbolism
- Dimensions: 110 cm × 110 cm (43.5 in × 43.5 in)
- Location: Museum of Modern Art, New York City

The Park (German: Der Park) is an oil painting on canvas by Austrian artist Gustav Klimt, painted c. 1909 – c. 1910. It is held by the Museum of Modern Art in New York City.

== Background ==
The Park was left undated, but can be placed between the summer of 1909 and its first exhibition in April 1910. The painting was executed in the park on the land-facing side of Schloss Kammer on the Attersee. In this work, Klimt depicts a stand of trees within the castle grounds, where he spent his summer holidays and developed his landscape painting.

== Description ==
In The Park, dense, tapestry-like foliage covers the majority of the picture surface, leaving only a narrow lower section with tree trunks, grass, and a clipped hedge. These elements provide context for the rest of the composition, which is otherwise a mosaic of green, blue, and yellow spots of similar size that is, to all intents and purposes, an abstract composition. This expansive foliage has been compared to the background of Klimt's The Golden Knight (1903) and has been described as forming a largely planar, undifferentiated mass of colour. Margaret Livingstone describes the leaves as forming a semi-repetitive pattern that produces an illusion of depth, while Angela Wenzel notes a flickering effect produced through the use of small dots of colour, enhanced by variations in brushstroke direction, and compares this to Pointillism. Stephan Koja has described Klimt's Schloss Kammer paintings as demonstrating how Klimt's "personal style of pointillism developed into a mosaic-like form".

Koja describes the composition as being orthogonally organised and "constructed from rectangular areas of varying colour and density". He notes this regular structure is interrupted only by a single slender tree trunk in the upper left of the canvas. Tobias G. Natter describes the continuity of the canopy as extending beyond the edges of the picture and "fusing … into a flat tapestry". He notes that only in the lower area of the painting do the tree trunks open the scene, admitting light and creating a sense of space and distance. Through the trees, a view of the Attersee may be visible. According to Koja, later varnishing altered the painting's original colouring and atmosphere.

== Interpretation ==
The painting has also been interpreted in psychological terms. Drawing on Freudian theory, writer Ruth Ronen argues that the dense "green thicket" and uncertain spatial structure raise anxiety in the viewer, despite the "apparently innocent depiction of a park". She suggests that this anxiety "cannot be located in any signifier" within the image, but instead "resides in the spectator as subject", creating an anxious mode of viewing.

== History ==
The Park was first exhibited at the Ninth Venice Biennale from April to October 1910. It was also displayed at the 1911 International Exhibition of Art in Rome and at the 1917 Austrian Art Exhibition in Stockholm. At the time of Klimt's death in 1918, the painting remained in his studio. In 1928, the Neue Galerie, Vienna acquired the work from Emilie Louise Flöge. By 1939, it was with Galerie St. Etienne in Paris, which relocated to New York the following year. The Park was then acquired from gallery owner Otto Kallir by the Museum of Modern Art in 1957. It was Klimt's first significant work to enter an American public collection at a time when his work was not well known to American audiences. The painting subsequently became one of the museum's most popular paintings. The Park remains in the collection of the Museum of Modern Art today.

== See also ==
- List of paintings by Gustav Klimt

== Citations ==
- Koja, Stephan (2006), Gustav Klimt Landscapes, translated by Gabriel, John; Law, Rebecca; McInnes, Robert, Prestel Publishing, ISBN 978-3-7913-3717-3
- Natter, Tobias G., ed. (2018), Gustav Klimt: drawings & paintings, Bibliotheca universalis, Cologne, Germany: Taschen, ISBN 978-3-8365-6290-4
