= Danaë (Klimt) =

1907 painting by Gustav Klimt

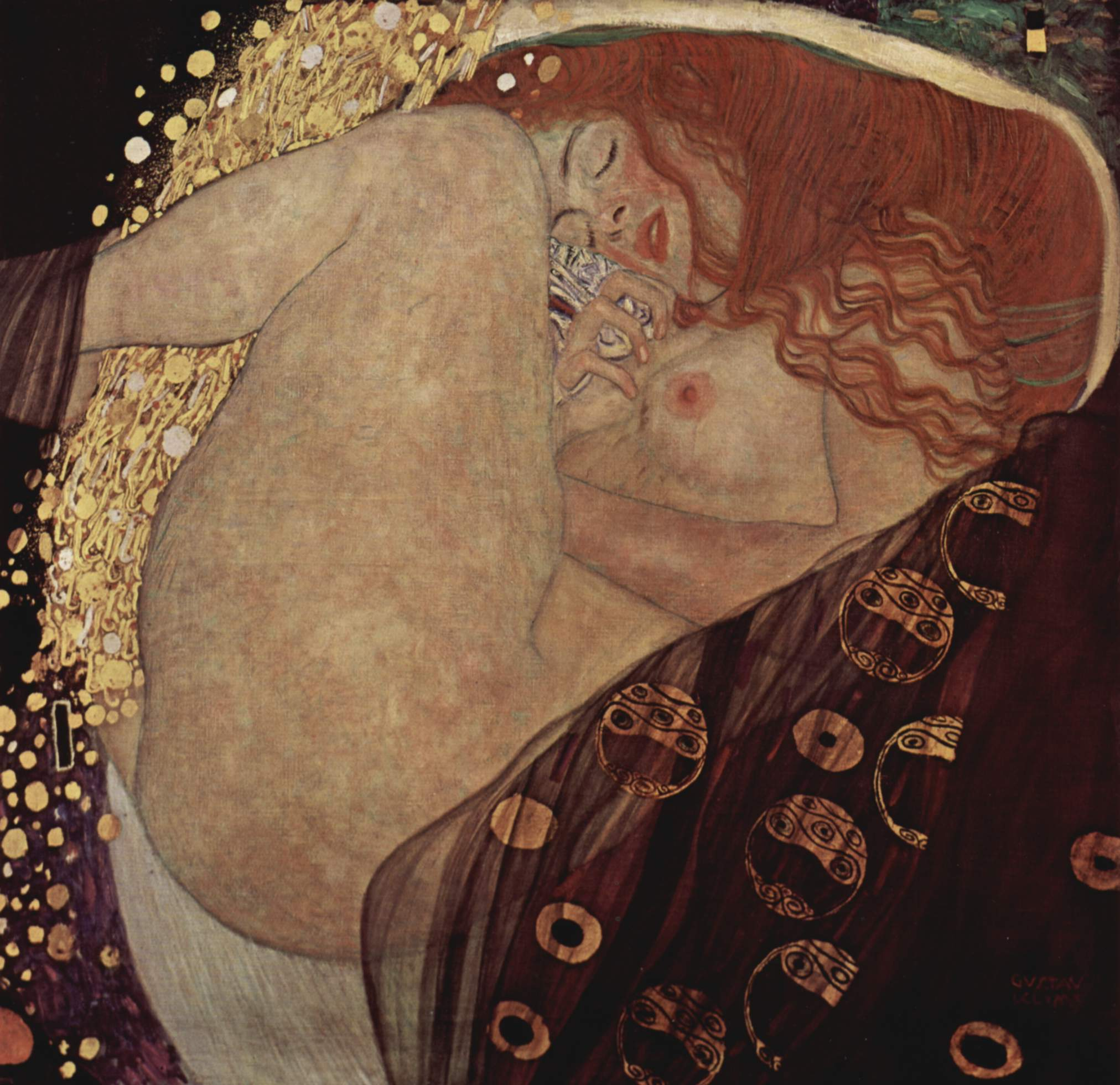
- Artist: Gustav Klimt
- Year: 1907
- Subject: Danaë
- Dimensions: 77 cm × 83 cm (30 in × 33 in)
- Location: Collection Hans Dichand, Vienna, Austria

Danaë is an oil painting by the Austrian artist Gustav Klimt, created in 1907. An example of Symbolism, the canvas measures 77 x 83 cm, and was in the Galerie Würthle in Vienna until it closed in 1995. The work belongs to the art collection of Hans Dichand (1921–2010) and is today in the possession of his three children.

Danaë was a popular subject in the early 1900s for many artists; she was used as the quintessential symbol of divine love, and transcendence.

== Subject and composition ==
While imprisoned by her father Acrisius, King of Argos, in a tower of bronze, Danaë was visited by Zeus, symbolized here as the golden rain flowing between her legs. It is apparent from the subject's face that she is aroused by the golden stream.

In this work, she is curled in a royal purple veil which refers to her imperial lineage. Sometime after her celestial visitation she gave birth to a son, Perseus, who is cited later in Greek mythology for slaying the Gorgon Medusa and rescuing Andromeda.

Many early portrayals of Danaë were erotic; other paintings completed in similar style are Klimt's Medicine (1900–1907), and Water Snakes I (1904–1907).

== See also ==
- Danaë (Correggio)
- Danaë (Rembrandt painting)
- Danaë (Titian series)
- List of paintings by Gustav Klimt
