= Water Serpents I =

1904–1907 painting by Gustav Klimt

- Wasserschlangen I
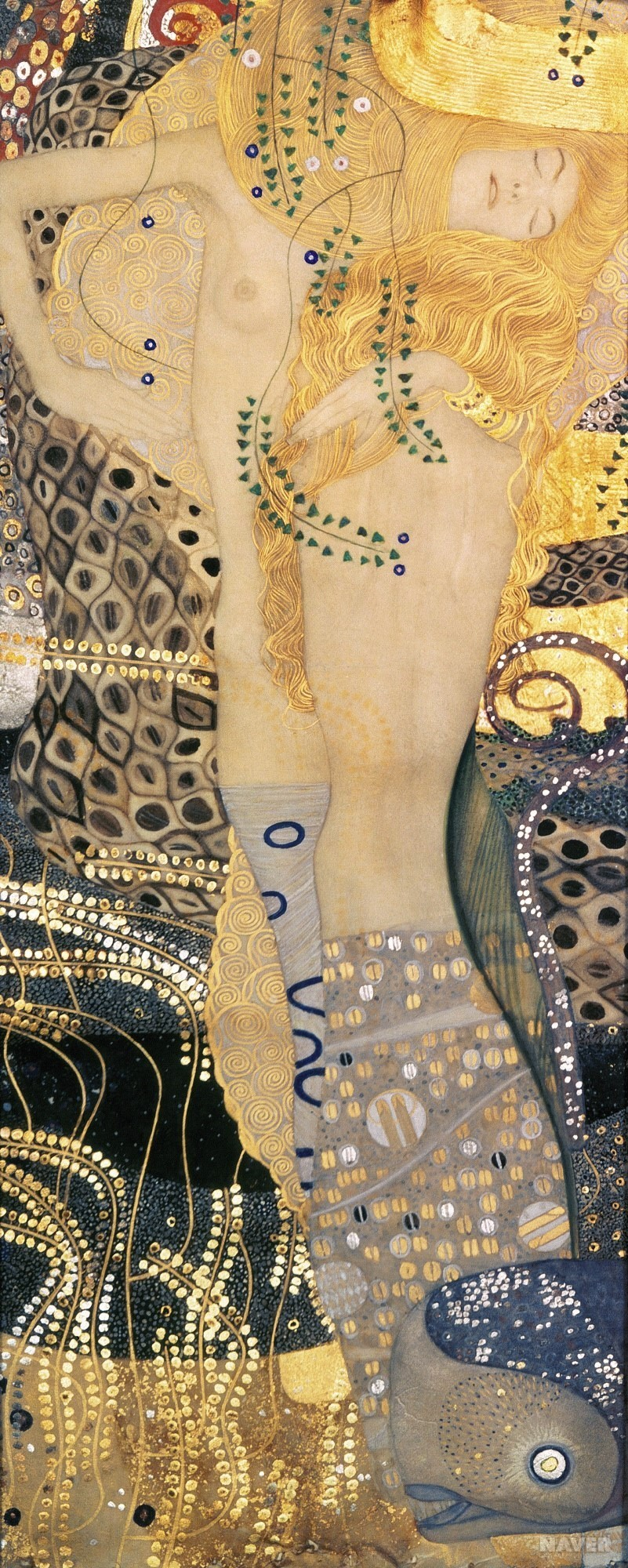
- Artist: Gustav Klimt
- Year: 1904–1907
- Medium: Watercolour, gouache, pencil, gold, silver, platinum and brass on parchment
- Dimensions: 50 cm × 20 cm (20 in × 7.9 in)
- Location: Österreichische Galerie Belvedere, Vienna

Water Serpents I (German: Wasserschlangen I), or Water Snakes I, is a painting by Austrian artist Gustav Klimt produced between 1904 and 1907. The piece is from Klimt's "Golden Phase," which is distinguished by his sensuous themes, elaborate patterns, and heavy use of gold leaf. An important work in Klimt's body of work, it explores themes of fluidity, femininity, and sensuality. These themes are frequently interpreted in relation to the artist's fascination with the interaction between the human form and water.

== Description ==
The creatures Klimt called "water serpents" or "mermaids" appear removed from reality. The seabed contains golden seaweed, and from the lower right corner of the picture a fish gazes out with a fixed eye. Inspired by the symbolist art movement, Klimt created this work on parchment at the height of his so-called Golden Period.

Art historian Frank Whitford has identified women as sexual objects as a major subject of Klimt's work. In his view, the painting does not depict snakes or mythological creatures but a voyeuristic male fantasy of "a half-naked lesbian couple writhing in orgasmic ecstasy". Cassidy Hughes writes that Klimt often depicted eroticised women in passive, dreamlike states, identifying Water Serpents I as such an example and describing it as the "usual Klimt offering".

== History and provenance ==
Water Snakes I was displayed at the Kunstschau Wien 1908 alongside fifteen of Klimt's other works. It was later purchased by Austro-Hungarian industrialist Karl Wittgenstein, whose daughter Klimt painted in 1905. The painting is now housed in the Österreichische Galerie Belvedere in Vienna.

== See also ==
- List of paintings by Gustav Klimt

== Citations ==
- Whitford, Frank (1990), Klimt, World of Art, London: Thames and Hudson, ISBN 978-0-500-20246-3
