= Nora Stiasny =

Austrian Jewish art collector

Eleonore Stiasny also known as Nora Stiasny née Zuckerkandl (16 December 1898 – 1942) was an Austrian Jewish art collector murdered in the Holocaust.

== Early life ==
Stiasny was born on 16 December 1898, in Vienna to Otto and Amalie Zuckerkandl who was famously portrayed by Gustav Klimt, and was the niece of the great collectors Viktor and Paula Zuckerkandl. She married Paul Stiasny.

== Nazi era ==
She was forced to sell a painting by Klimt, entitled Apple Tree, a few months after Austria's Anschluss with Nazi Germany, and was later deported by Nazis and murdered in 1942 with her mother, her husband and son.

== Restitution claims ==
In 2000, the Austrian restitution commission advised the return of Klimt's Apple Trees II, hanging in the Belvedere Museum, to the heirs of Nora Stiasny. However, the commission made a mistake. It was later discovered that the painting had belonged to Serena Lederer, and not Nora Stiasny, who had owned a different Klimt.

In 2021 France restituted the Klimt Rose Bushes Under Trees ("Rosiers sous les arbres") which had hung in the Musée d'Orsay to the Stiasny heirs.

== See also ==
- The Holocaust in Austria
- List of claims for restitution of Nazi-looted art
