= Women Friends =

1916–1917 painting by Gustav Klimt

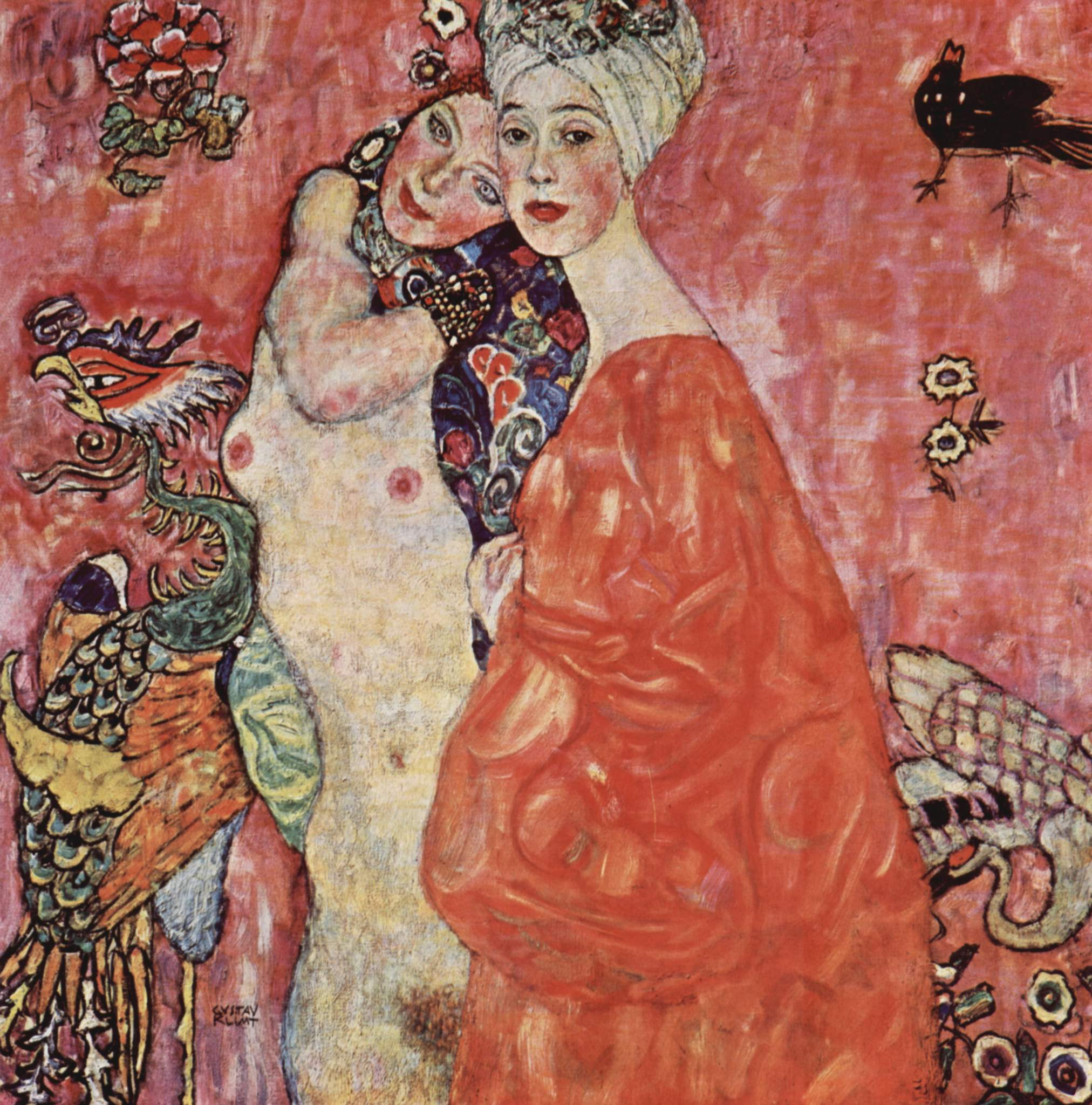
- Artist: Gustav Klimt
- Year: 1916–1917
- Medium: Oil on canvas
- Dimensions: 99 cm × 99[?] cm (40 in × 40[?] in)

Women Friends (1916–1917) is a painting by Austrian symbolist painter Gustav Klimt. Alternatively known as The Friends, or Girlfriends II (Freundinnen II), among others, the work was destroyed by fire in 1945 alongside several other of Klimt's paintings in the burning of Schloss Immendorf.

== Description ==
Made towards the end of Klimt's career, the visual language seen in many of his other late paintings is visible in Women Friends. Such stylizations include the flattening of planes (Lady with a Fan), visible brushstrokes (Portrait of a Lady), attention to color, and exaggeration of form and pose (The Kiss, The Maiden).

The subject depicts two women, one nude and one clothed in a flowing red garment, gazing out towards the viewer. The nude woman leans into the other figure, her head pointed at an angle and her arm twisted around her chest. She is adorned in colorful, patterned jewelry, and fabric tied around her neck. The clothed woman turns her head over her shoulder, wearing a headscarf also adorned with patterning. Although the painting has no true representational background, simply patchy pink tones, there is an allusion to depth through the positioning of the figures, the clothed woman standing slightly in front of the nude woman. Surrounding the women are oriental motifs, those of birds, both real and fantastical, and flowers. Their bright colors and black outlining create an illustrative effect. This is amplified by the lack of light source, naturalistic shading, or three-dimensionality in the bodies of the women. The loose and colorful brushstrokes of the background complete this effect, reflected in the treatment of brushstrokes in both clothing and skin.

== Themes ==
Oriental themes became one of Klimt's staples towards the end of his career, after 1910, seen primarily as motifs in the background. Also visible in other portraits, such as his portraits of Friederike Maria Beer, Elisabeth Lederer, and his final work Lady with a Fan, he engaged frequently with Chinese art. In the background of Women Friends, there are motifs of the phoenix (or Feng-hua) on the bottom left, the lotus on the top left, and the crane on the bottom right, all symbols of luck.

Klimt treated the subject of women and feminine beauty most in his paintings, rarely depicting men. He combined both studies of models and imaginative, idealization of poses and expressions. Women Friends is one of several outliers, in that the models are unknown, and the painting was not commissioned, as many of his portraits of the Viennese bourgeoisie were. Many of Klimt's compositions sought to portray femininity in new and radically different staging. This included potential depictions of lesbianism, incorporated into the more overtly explored ranges of sexuality and of the female body within his works. Although the relationship of the women in the painting remains ambiguous, the topic was a fashionable one in French pop culture, and Klimt is known for his exploration of female sexuality. Similar themes are speculated in his paintings Water Serpents I and Water Serpents II. Whether intended or not, many of his paintings of women are provocative through their nudity and intimate compositions.

== History of ownership ==
The Lederer family, consisting of August Lederer and his wife Serena Lederer, were Viennese art collectors who were one of the main patrons of Klimt. They owned the largest amount of his drawings and paintings, forming the most important ensemble of his artistic career. The Lederer Collection included Women Friends as well as many other prominent works of Klimt's career, such as the Beethoven Frieze, Schubert at the Piano, Philosophy and Jurisprudence, as well as commissioned portraits of Serena Lederer, her mother, and her daughter. Many of Klimt's portraits of women were commissioned, and at quite high prices, at this point in his career. There is no evidence this painting was commissioned, representing rather imagined characters. Klimt was known for his portraiture of women and his fascination with the depiction of female sexuality.

Twenty years after Klimt's death, nearing the outbreak of the Second World War, Germany annexed Austria in 1938, thus bringing to a halt private collecting of the arts. Dispossessed along with many other Austrian art, sculpture, and cultural items, some of the Lederer Collection was inventoried and categorized into the 'Reich List' as cultural treasures. In 1943, Klimt's paintings were the focus of a Nazi retrospective hosted in the Secession Building (renamed at the time to 'Friedrichstrasse Gallery') in occupied Vienna. Women Friends was one of the works on display, as well as many of Klimt's other renowned works, such as The Kiss and Judith I.

Following this, Klimt's works were moved to Schloss Immendorf, as well as many other paintings, books, and statues, for protection. In 1945, a fire started within the castle, destroying a majority of the works inside. Klimt's pieces were large canvases, making them even more improbable to escape the flames. The origins of the fire are mysterious, and multiple unproven hypotheses remain.

== See also ==
- List of paintings by Gustav Klimt
