= Serena Lederer =

Austro-Hungarian art collector

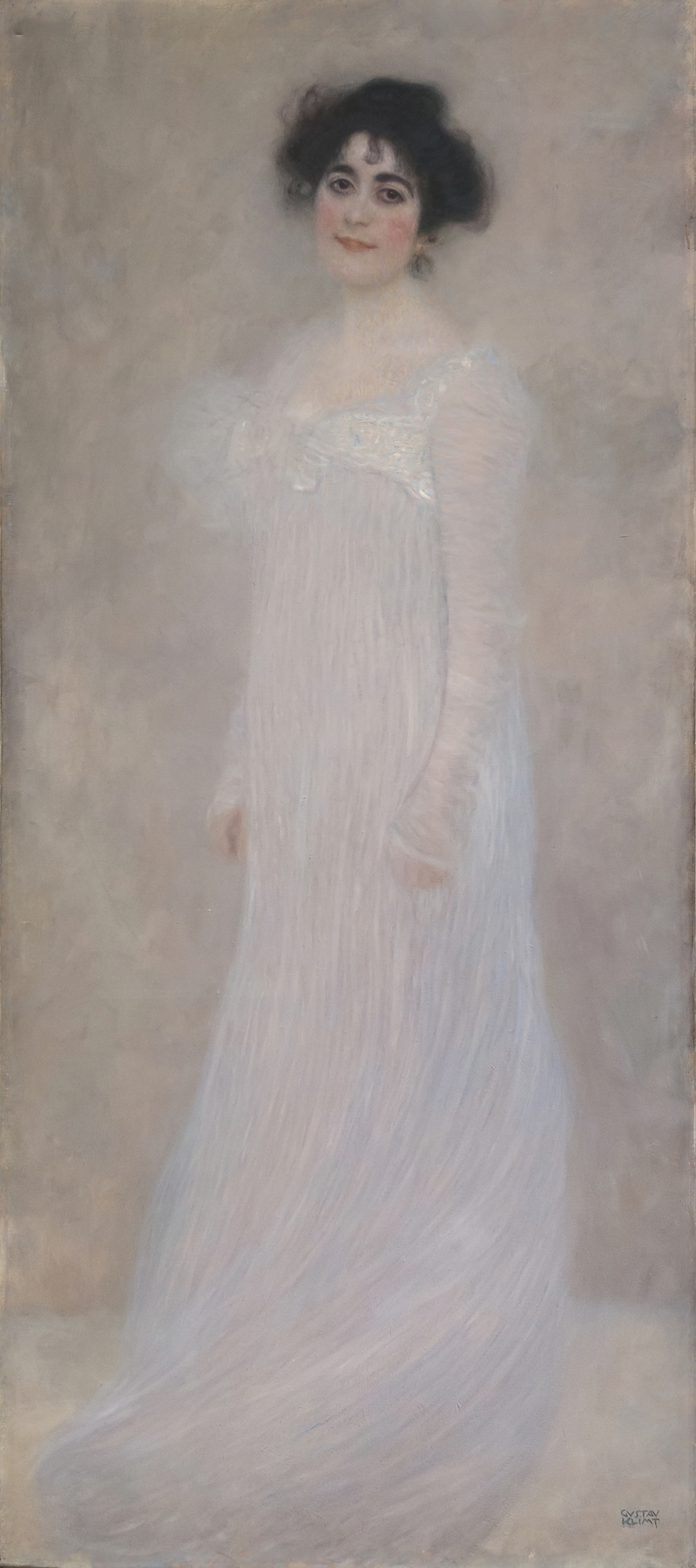
Serena Pulitzer Lederer by Gustav Klimt, 1899

Serena (Szeréna) Pulitzer Lederer (20 May 1867 in Budapest – 27 March 1943) was an Austro-Hungarian art collector and the spouse of the industrial magnate August Lederer, close friend of Gustav Klimt and instrumental in the constitution of the collection of Klimt's art pieces.

== Early life ==
Lederer was born in Budapest on 20 May 1867 to Simon Siegmund Pulitzer and his wife Charlotte (née Politzer), into a wealthy Jewish family. She was grandniece of the U.S. journalist Joseph Pulitzer. Serena was known for being a beauty in her youth and later a Grande Dame. She married August Lederer on 5 June 1892 at the Rabbinat of Pest. They owned several properties in Vienna, including the Ledererschlössel and Weidlingau Castle and an apartment in Győr, Hungary. Their main residence was their apartment at Bartensteingasse no.8 in Vienna, near Gustav Klimt's studio. They kept a large portion of their art collection at this address.

== Art ==
The Lederer couple were good friends to Gustav Klimt and among his most significant patrons. Serena Lederer was the principal force behind the accumulation of the family’s art collection. This collection included a number of Renaissance and medieval works and works by Egon Schiele, Gustav Klimt, and other artists. According to their son Erich Lederer (1896–1985), their residence had been furnished by the Wiener Werkstätte founded by Josef Hoffmann and Koloman Moser in Vienna in 1903. The furnishings had been entrusted to Eduard Josef Wimmer-Wisgrill.

As early as 1888, Gustav Klimt made a first miniature portrait of the young and then unmarried Serena Lederer for his work Audience Room in the Old Burgtheater. In Vienna, one room of the flat was dedicated to Klimt works. Klimt painted Portrait of Serena Lederer in 1899, Portrait of Elisabeth Lederer between 1914 and 1916, and a portrait of Serena’s mother, Charlotte Pulitzer, in 1915. The painting of Serena was the origin of a close friendship. On Klimt's recommendation, in 1912, Egon Schiele was introduced to the Lederer family, becoming friends with Erich Lederer, the youngest son, and giving him drawing lessons.

Paintings by Klimt in the Lederer collection included the aforementioned family portraits, Philosophy and Jurisprudence, the Beethoven Frieze, Schubert at the Piano, Water Serpents I, and Women Friends, among others.

== Nazi persecution ==
The Lederer collection was confiscated from Serena in 1940 and she fled to Budapest, where she died three years later. The Gestapo transferred the collection to Immendorf Castle, but the castle was set on fire in May, 1945 so that it would not fall into the hands of the Allies and some artworks in the collection were destroyed. However some of the artworks reappeared after the war. The Lederers' son Erich and his wife Elisabeth took refuge in Switzerland.

In order to avoid Nazi persecution, Lederer's daughter, Elisabeth, claimed she was the biological daughter of Lederer and Klimt, which Lederer signed an affidavit to verify. This allowed Elisabeth to remain in Vienna before dying of natural causes in 1944.

== Restitution claims for looted art ==
After the war, 459 works by Gustav Klimt and 77 by Egon Schiele were returned to the Lederers, however, most of the artworks were not found. Works that were recovered, however, could not be moved out of Austria, which forbade the Lederer family from exporting Klimt's masterpiece Beethoven Frieze to Switzerland. In 2018, the Lederer heirs went to court in Switzerland to attempt to oblige the Swiss art dealer Galerie Kornfeld to answer questions about artworks from the Lederer collection that had reappeared after the war with Wolfgang, Hildebrand and Cornelius Gurlitt. Also in 2018, it was discovered that Austrian authorities had restituted one of the Lederer's Klimts, Apple Tree II, to the wrong family. because an investigation by the Art Restitution Advisory Board that mistakenly confused the Klimt with a different painting.

== See also ==
- Vugesta
- The Holocaust in Austria
- List of Claims for Restitution for Nazi-looted art
- Eberhard W. Kornfeld
- Beethoven Frieze

== Bibliography ==
- Tobias Natter, Gerbert Frodl (Hsg.): Klimt und die Frauen (Ausstellungskatalog), Dumont Köln 2000 ISBN 3-8321-7271-8
