= Erich Lederer =

Austrian-Swiss art collector (1896–1985)

- Born: 13 September 1896; Vienna, Austria-Hungary
- Died: 19 January 1985 (aged 89); Geneva, Switzerland
- Occupations: Art collector, patron
- Known for: Lederer family art collection, Klimt restitution, Beethoven Frieze
- Parent(s): August Lederer, Serena Lederer (née Pulitzer)

Erich Lederer (1896–1985) was an Austrian-born art collector, heir to the prominent Lederer family collection, and a key figure in post-war restitution debates, especially concerning Gustav Klimt’s Beethoven Frieze.

== Early life ==
Erich Lederer was born in Vienna in 1896 to industrialist and collector August Lederer and Serena Lederer (née Pulitzer). The Lederers were major patrons of the Viennese Secession, especially of Gustav Klimt and Egon Schiele.

== Relationship with Egon Schiele ==
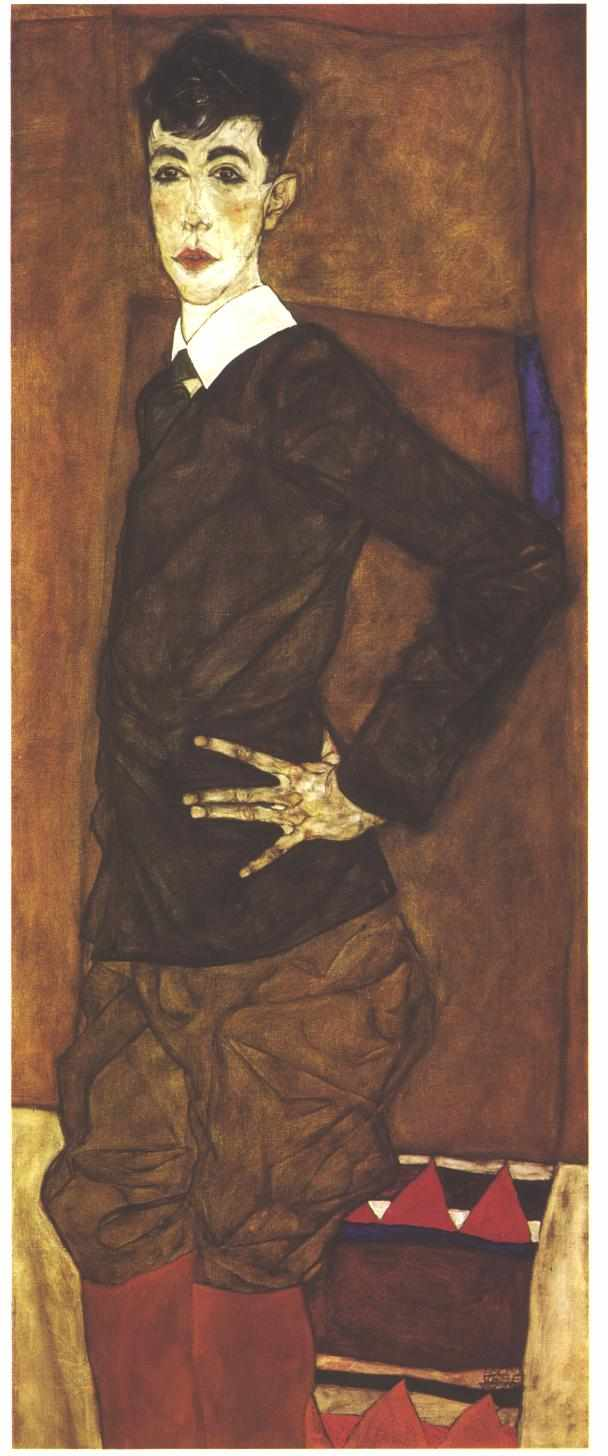
Portrait of Erich Lederer by Egon Schiele

Lederer became friends with Egon Schiele around 1912, reportedly introduced by Klimt. According to his biographical record, Schiele made several portraits of him, and Lederer himself was artistically inclined as a youth.

== Nazi persecution and exile ==
After the Anschluss (merger of Austria with Nazi Germany) in 1938, the Lederers were persecuted because of their Jewish heritage. Erich Lederer fled Austria and settled in Geneva, Switzerland Many parts of the Lederer family's art collection had been confiscated or displaced during the Nazi era.

The Lederers were classified as Jewish under the Nuremberg Laws, and their assets in Austria were placed under “provisional administration,” leading to the loss of their residential properties in Vienna, household furnishings, bank accounts, securities, and other financial holdings. Most significant was the seizure and dispersal of the family’s major art collection, one of the most important private holdings of works by Gustav Klimt and Egon Schiele. Many artworks were confiscated directly, transferred to Nazi-controlled repositories, or forcibly sold through state-directed dealers such as the Zentralstelle für Denkmalschutz. Portions of the collection were sent to storage facilities, including Schloss Immendorf, where several Klimt canvases owned by the Lederers were destroyed by fire in 1945.

== Restitution and export bans ==
After the war, Erich Lederer pursued restitution claims for both financial assets and artworks, recovering some pieces, while others remained missing, destroyed, or locked behind Austrian export restrictions for decades.

One of the artworks that Lederer successfully recovered was the Klimt Beethoven Frieze. However, due to Austrian export controls on culturally significant works, he was unable to take the artwork out of Austria, including bringing the frieze to his home in Switzerland. In 1973, he sold the frieze to the Republic of Austria for US$750,000. The sale and its circumstances have been contested by his heirs, who argue it was made under duress due to the export ban.

In 2015, an Austrian advisory panel recommended against returning the frieze to the heirs, a decision the government followed.

Another artwork that Lederer recovered was the portrait that Klimt had painted of his older sister, Elisabeth Lederer. In November 2025, Portrait of Elisabeth Lederer was sold at Sotheby's by the estate of the art collector Leonard Lauder for $238 million.

== Later life ==
In his later years, Erich Lederer lived in Geneva and built a reputation as a connoisseur of Renaissance bronzes.

== See also ==
- The Holocaust in Austria
- Unser Wien
- List of claims for restitution for Nazi-looted art
