= Portrait of Elisabeth Lederer =

1914–1916 painting by Gustav Klimt

- Bildnis Elisabeth Lederer (German)
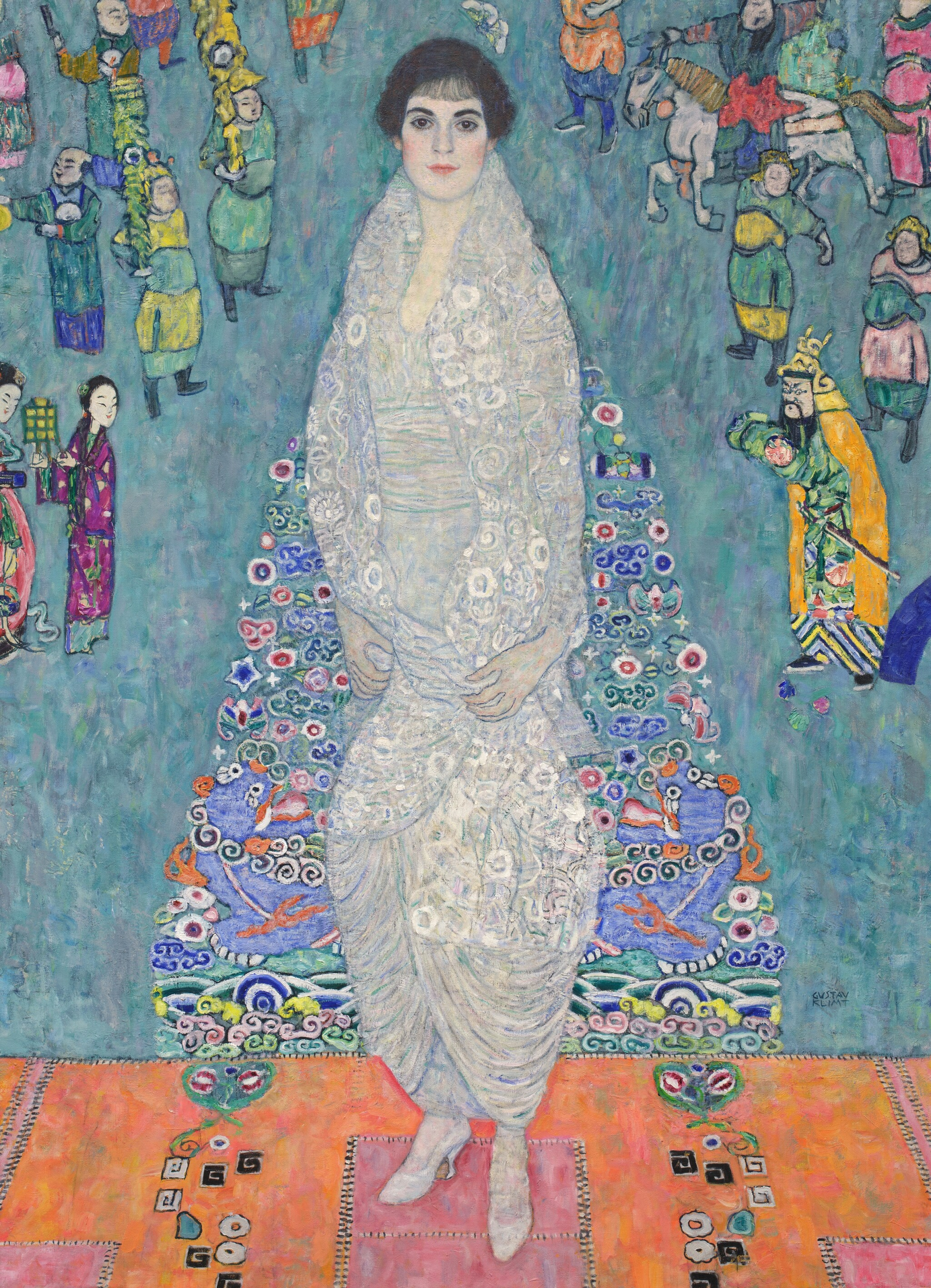
- Artist: Gustav Klimt
- Year: 1914–1916
- Medium: Oil on canvas
- Subject: Elisabeth Lederer
- Dimensions: 180.4 cm × 130.5 cm (71.0 in × 51.4 in)
- Owner: Undisclosed private owner

Portrait of Elisabeth Lederer (German: Bildnis Elisabeth Lederer) or Portrait of Elisabeth Bachofen-Echt is an oil painting on canvas by Austrian artist Gustav Klimt, painted 1914–1916. The life-size portrait depicts a young Elisabeth Lederer, daughter of Viennese art collectors August and Serena Lederer, who commissioned the work. The painting was later owned by American collector Leonard Lauder. On 18 November 2025, following Lauder's death earlier that year, Portrait of Elisabeth Lederer was sold at Sotheby's in New York for US$236.4 million, making it the most expensive work of modern art sold at auction and the second most expensive work of art ever sold at auction.

== Subject ==
Elisabeth Lederer was the daughter of Jewish industrialist August Lederer and Serena Lederer, some of Klimt's most prominent patrons. Klimt lived close to the Lederers and was a frequent visitor. Elisabeth became the second member of the Lederer family to sit for Klimt, after his 1899 portrait of Serena. Klimt would later depict her grandmother, Charlotte Pulitzer, in 1915. At the time of this painting, the Lederers were the second wealthiest family in Vienna, behind only the Rothschilds. Elisabeth married Baron Wolfgang von Bachofen-Echt in 1921, converting to Protestantism, but returned to Judaism after their divorce in 1938. Following the Anschluss of 1938, much of her family fled and the Lederer art collection was looted by the Nazis. To avoid persecution, Elisabeth obtained a document stating that Klimt was her father, and was helped by a senior Nazi official who was a former brother-in-law. This allowed her to remain in Vienna until her death from a severe illness on 19 October 1944.

== Description ==
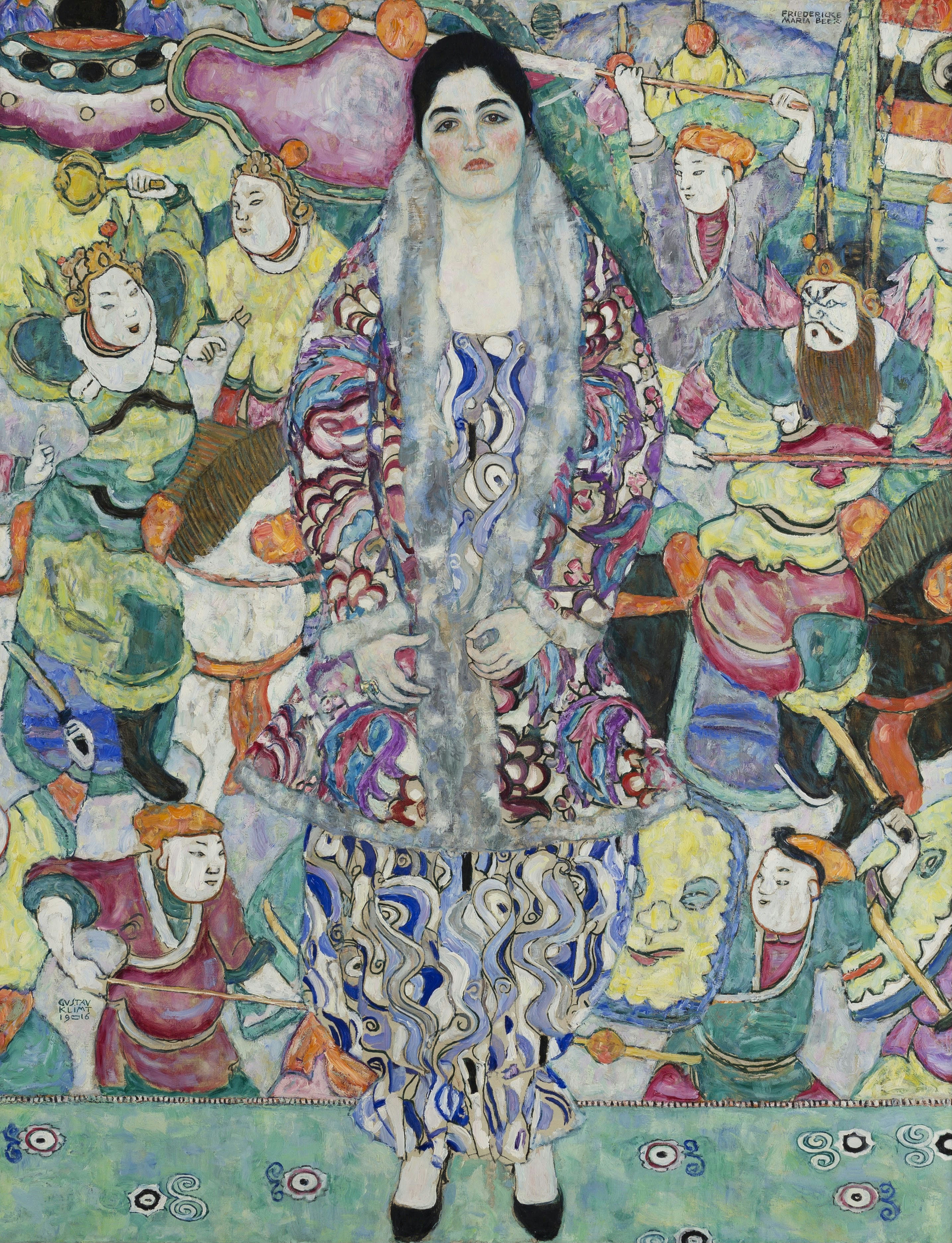
Portrait of Friederike Maria Beer (1916), another late full-length portrait by Klimt with similarly elaborate ornamental design.

In Portrait of Elisabeth Lederer, Klimt depicts twenty-year-old Elisabeth in a flowing, white dress, as he had done for her mother in Portrait of Serena Lederer. For Elisabeth, however, it is not a loose gown but a close-fitting top and a skirt, over which she wears a white chiffon shawl with floral patterns. Her attire reflects contemporary Parisian fashion, particularly the designs of Paul Poiret, whose "harem" pantaloons and Chinese-inspired tunics were widely popular in the early 1910s. The ambiguous, trouser-like effect of the skirt derives from the hobble skirt, another Poiret innovation referencing Eastern-inspired dress. Tobias G. Natter compares the skirt to the fashion of plus fours. Emily Braun argues that the aesthetic "fusion" demonstrated by these fashion codes served to emphasise the "sophistication and cosmopolitanism" of the Lederers. The carpet beneath Lederer's white silk shoes combines bold pink-orange tones with black and white borders reminiscent of the designs of Josef Hoffmann and Wimmer-Wisgrill for the Wiener Werkstätte, while its irregular green and white circles recall Chinese jade.

The painting belongs to a group of Klimt's late portraits that depart from the geometric, hard-edged shapes of his 'golden phase' and use East Asian motifs more prominently. The background is somewhat unclear, possibly because Klimt was prevented from fully completing the painting. According to Braun, the background includes figures derived from Chinese material culture and Peking opera, including low-ranking military types, scholar figures, and courtiers, rendered in a narrative role. Braun notes Klimt's familiarity with Japanese and Chinese art, observing that he owned ukiyo-e prints, kimonos, Qing court robes, and books on East Asian art in his personal library. Natter writes that they "resemble figures from a dream … this mood is echoed by the ornamental field rising behind Elisabeth's figure". These background figures, as with Klimt's Portrait of Adele Bloch-Bauer II and Portrait of Friederike Maria Beer, are inspired by the decoration of oriental ceramics.

Braun notes that the painting is organised around a triangular structure in the upper half of the canvas, stabilising the composition around Elisabeth's figure. Infrared reflectography indicates that Klimt revised the composition during the painting process, revealing that additional background figures were originally present in the empty space above the carpet but were painted over. Klimt made many preparatory drawings of Elisabeth, while the ornamental elements were developed directly on the canvas during the painting process. Traces of underdrawing remain visible on the white garment. Klimt typically began his portraits with charcoal or conté underdrawing that established the areas of costume and ornament before developing the decorative surface in paint.

Writing in ARTNews, Daniel Cassady describes the portrait as "widely considered one of Klimt’s most intricately conceived late portraits". The painting is one of only two full-length commissions by Klimt remaining in private ownership, the other being Portrait of Adele Bloch‑Bauer II. Art historians describe its colourfulness as characteristic of Klimt’s late style. Frank Whitford compares it to Portrait of Friederike Maria Beer, describing both as "gorgeous fashion plates" in which Klimt's focus on ornamentation and aesthetic concerns can be seen as avoiding more serious psychological questions. He further notes that contemporary critics recognised this; the critic Karl Kuzmany, for example, acknowledged that Klimt valued likeness but argued that each successive portrait represented a distinct artistic challenge.

== History ==
Portrait of Elisabeth Lederer was commissioned by Elisabeth's parents in 1914, when she was a young woman but still living at home. Klimt worked on the portrait for several years and was reportedly reluctant to consider it finished. In 1916, Serena Lederer is said to have taken the portrait from Klimt's studio, believing it to be complete, despite Klimt insisting it was not finished. Klimt was paid 35,000 crowns for the work. The painting only left the Lederer collection once, to be displayed at the 1917 Austrian Art Exhibition in Stockholm. The portrait was described by the Swedish art historian Andreas Lindblom as a figure who had "walked on a road of flowers to her magic carpet", with the "precious stones" of her eyes betraying her humanity.

Following the Nazi annexation of Austria (the "Anschluss") in 1938, the painting was seized by authorities in Vienna. Much of the Lederer art collection was destroyed in 1945 when retreating German forces set fire to Immendorf Castle, where the works had been placed for storage, to prevent them from falling into Soviet hands. Fifteen paintings by Klimt were destroyed in the fire. Portrait of Elisabeth Lederer and the other Lederer family portraits survived because, under Nazi regulations, portraits of Jewish sitters were seen as not worth confiscating. As a result, they were not sent to the castle but instead remained at the Dorotheum auction house. After the war, Portrait of Elisabeth Lederer was restituted in 1948 to Erich Lederer, Elisabeth's brother. It remained in his possession until 1983 when he sold it to art dealer Serge Sabarsky, two years before his death.

The portrait was acquired by Leonard Lauder in 1985 for an undisclosed amount. For decades, it hung above the dining room table in his New York residence and was occasionally lent anonymously to brief exhibitions in art galleries, including Klimt’s Women at the Belvedere in Vienna in 2000 and several shows at the Neue Galerie New York. It was exhibited from 2016 to 2017 in Klimt and the Women of Vienna’s Golden Age, 1900–1918 at the Neue Galerie and was loaned to the National Gallery of Canada in 2017. The work remained part of the Lauder Collection, a 55-work collection valued at over US$400 million, until it was sold at auction in November 2025 after Lauder's death earlier that year.

On 18 November 2025, the portrait became the most expensive work of modern art ever sold at auction, when it sold for US$236.4 million at Sotheby's in New York. The sale surpassed the previous record held by Pablo Picasso's Les Femmes d'Alger ("Version O") (1955), which sold for US$179.4 million in 2015. It also became the second most expensive artwork to ever sell at auction, behind Leonardo da Vinci's Salvator Mundi, which sold for US$450.3 million in 2017. The auction opened at US$130 million and lasted for 20 minutes before being won by a bid of US$205 million, made by Sotheby's specialist Julian Dawes on behalf of an undisclosed telephone bidder.

== See also ==
- List of paintings by Gustav Klimt
- List of most expensive paintings
