= August Lederer =

Austrian entrepreneur, collector and patronage

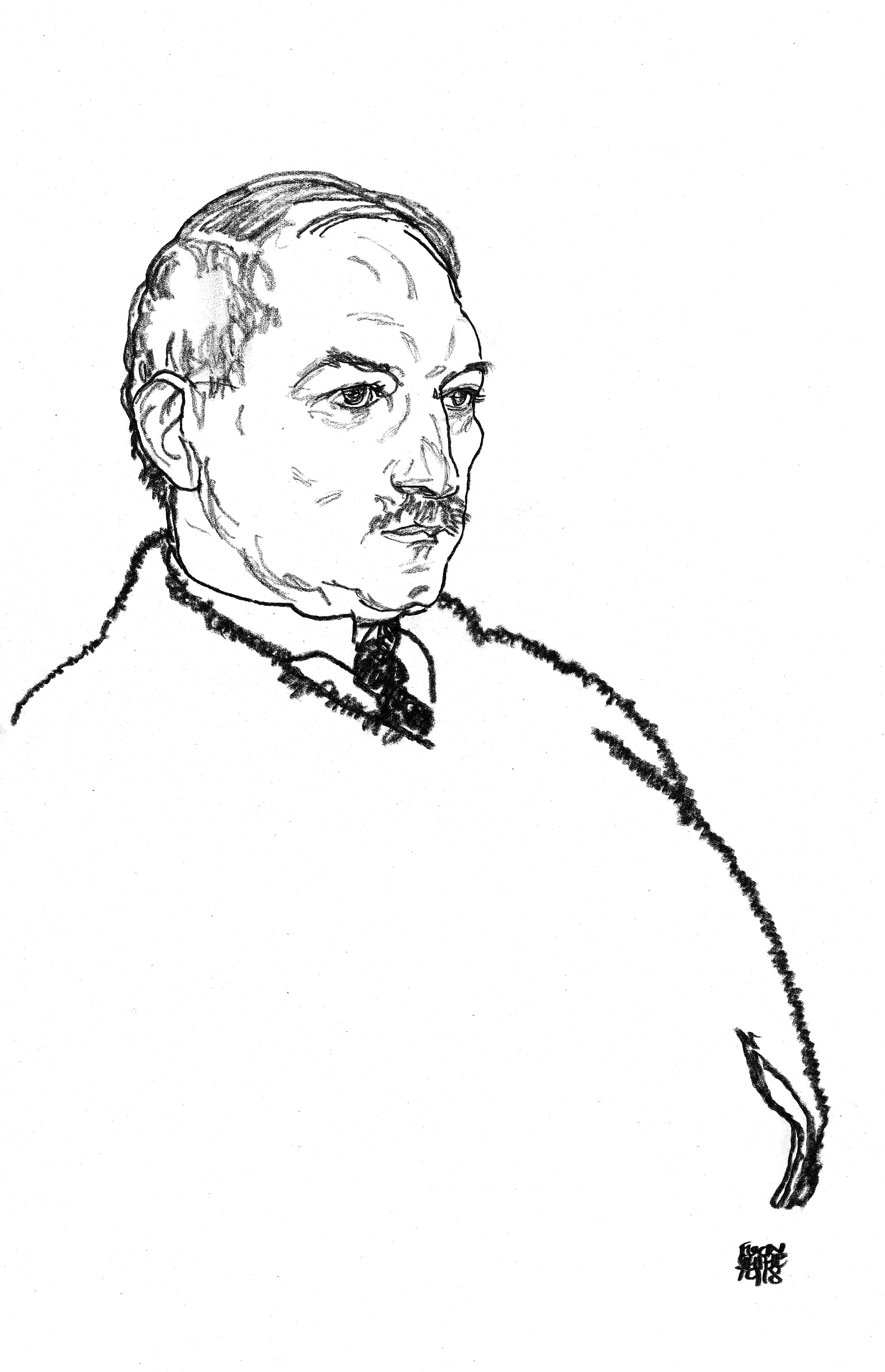
- Egon Schiele, August Lederer, 1918.
- Born: 3 May 1857; Česká Lípa (Austria-Hungary)
- Died: 30 April 1936 (aged 78); Vienna (Austria)
- Occupations: art collector, businessman, philanthropist
- Known for: The collection of August and Serena Lederer was considered the most important private collection of the work of Gustav Klimt. Lederer's business empire and art collection was looted by Nazis
- Notable work: restitution claims for Beethoven Frieze and other important artworks

August Lederer (3 May 1857 in Böhmisch Leipa (Austria-Hungary) – 30 April 1936 in Vienna), was an Austrian industrialist and art collector whose art collection was looted by Nazis. He helped promote the artists of the Vienna Secession, notably Gustav Klimt.

== Biography ==
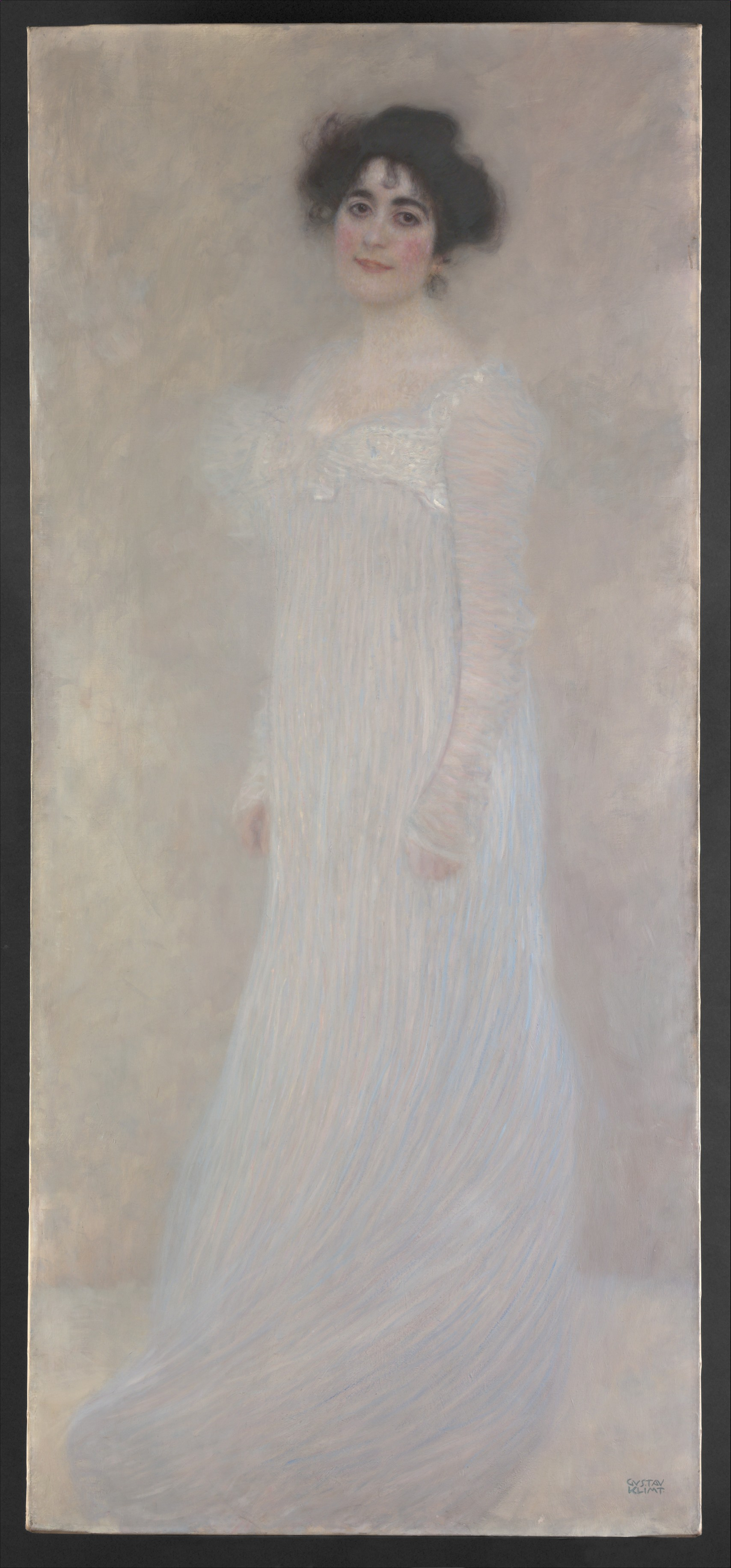
Gustav Klimt, Serena Lederer, 1899, oil on canvas, 191 × 85.5 cm, Metropolitan Museum of Art

In 1892, Lederer married Serena Pulitzer (1867–1943).

With a business empire built on distilleries, the Lederer family became the second wealthiest in Vienna, using their fortune to support artists and acquire art, notable of the Vienna Secession. To complete the artistic claim, the furnishings of the residence had been entrusted to Eduard Josef Wimmer-Wisgrill und produced by the Wiener Werkstätte founded by Josef Hoffmann and Koloman Moser.

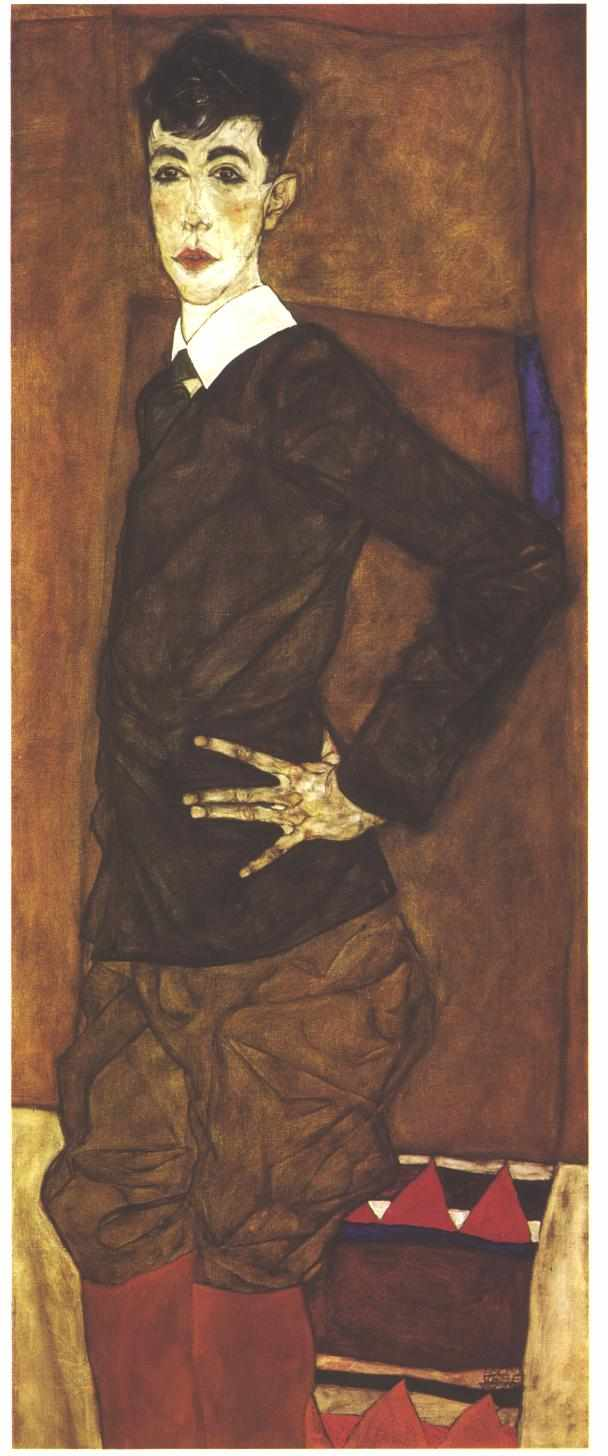
Egon Schiele, Portrait of Erich Lederer, 1912, oil and gouache on canvas, 139 × 55 cm, Kunstmuseum (Basel).

In 1912, the Lederers met Egon Schiele, who spent that year's Christmas with them in Györ, becoming friends with their son Erich, whom he painted and drew several times.

== Art collection ==
The Lederer's art collection was the largest and most important private collection of Gustav Klimt.

Lederer acquired the Beethoven Frieze from Carl Reininghaus in 1915.

Their relationship with Klimt was very friendly, intimate to the point that Elisabeth Franziska Lederer, born in 1894, was able to affirm during the Nazi period to be the adulterous daughter of the painter and to receive in 1940 a certificate of filiation establishing that she was only "Half-Jewish", while her two brothers, Erich and Fritz, were considered full Jews.

Gustav Klimt painted Portrait of Elisabeth Lederer between 1914 and 1916 for the Lederer family.

== Nazi persecution and looting ==
The Lederers' art collection was one of the first stolen by the Nazis in Austria.

The Gestapo seized most of the Lederer's art collection. The "Zentralstelle für Denkmalschutz" or so-called "Monument protection" and Vugesta were involved.

The Lederer collection, confiscated in 1938, was stored mainly at Immendorf Castle in Lower Austria, where it would have largely burned in early 1945 under poorly clarified circumstances - which seems to contradict the fact that certain paintings resurfaced after the war, which were returned to the heirs.

== Claims for restitution ==
In 1999, the Lederer heirs received the return of six works by Egon Schiele and a painting by Gentile Bellini.

In 2013, the Lederer heirs initiated a lawsuit to claim restitution of the Beethoven Frieze which had been looted by the Nazis. Austria refused the claim.

In 2018, a Swiss court in Geneva ordered that the Galerie Kornfeld respond to questions asked by the Lederer heirs concerning artworks by Klimt and Schiele.

Austria restituted a Klimt painting that was looted from the Lederers to the wrong family.

== Bibliography ==
- Christian M. Nebehay, Gustav Klimt, Egon Schiele und die Familie Lederer (Gustav Klimt, Egon Schiele et la famille Lederer), Vienne, 1979.
- Tobias G. Natter et Gerbert Frodl, Klimt und die Frauen (Klimt et les femmes), Cologne-Vienne, 2000.

== See also ==
- Beethoven Frieze
- The Holocaust in Austria
- List of claims for restitution for Nazi-looted art
