= Beethoven Frieze =

1902 painting by Gustav Klimt

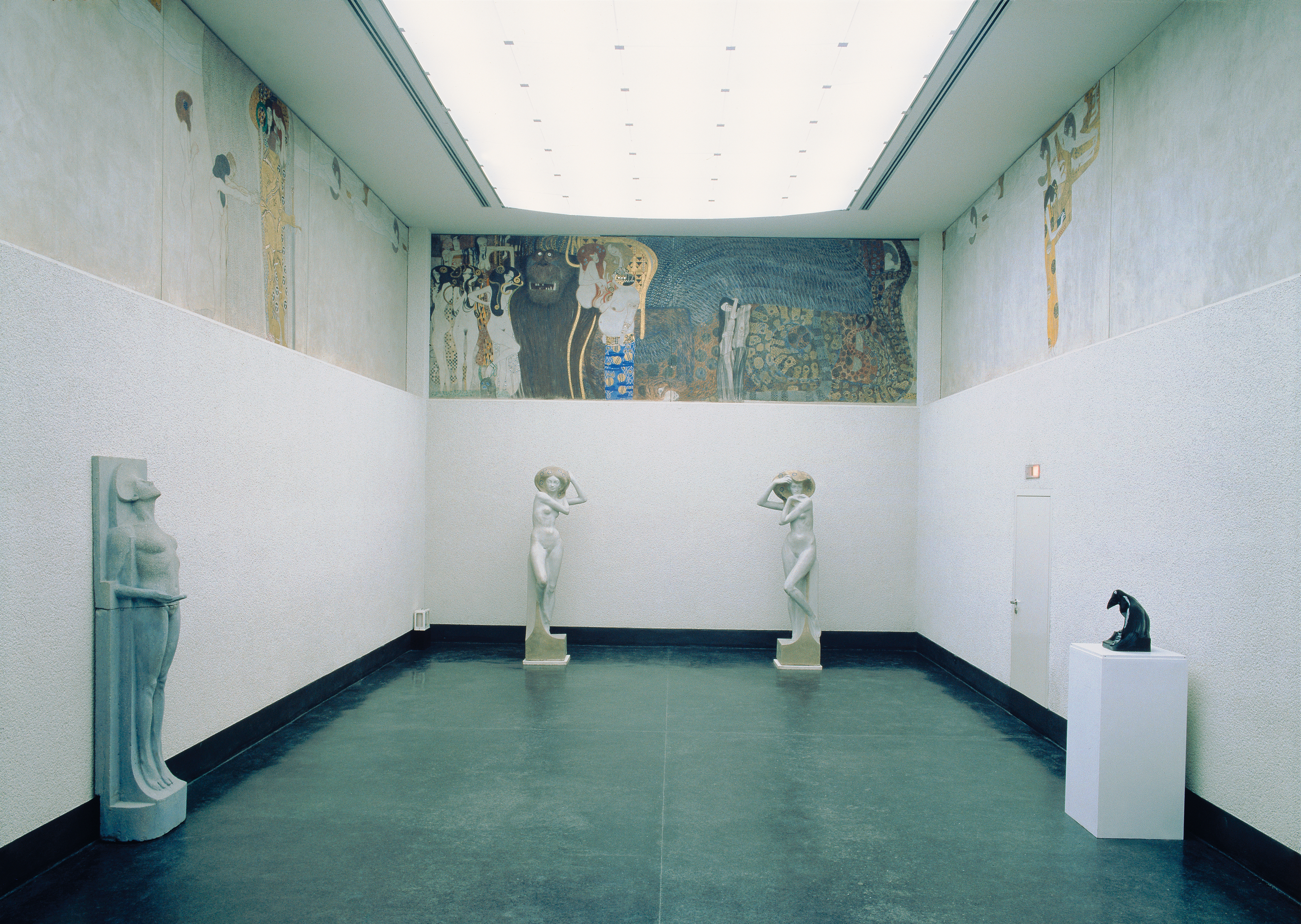
- Artist: Gustav Klimt
- Year: 1901–1902
- Medium: Charcoal, graphite, black, red and coloured chalk, pastel, casein colours, gold, silver, gilt stucco, applications (mother-of-pearl buttons, brass uniform buttons, mirror fragments, ground glass, brass curtain rings, upholstering nails, semi-precious stones) on mortar render over reed matting
- Location: Secession Building, Vienna, Austria

The Beethoven Frieze (German: Beethovenfries) is a painting by Gustav Klimt on display in the Secession Building, Vienna, Austria.

== Description ==
In 1902, Klimt painted the Beethoven Frieze for the Fourteenth Vienna Secession exhibition in celebration of 75th anniversary of the composer Ludwig van Beethoven's death. It was featured alongside a monumental polychrome sculpture by Max Klinger. Meant for the exhibition only, the frieze was painted directly on the walls with light materials.

The frieze is large, standing at 2.15 m (7 ft 1 in) high with a width of 34.14 m (112.0 ft). The entire work weighs four tons. It is inspired by the composer Richard Wagner's interpretation of Beethoven's Ninth symphony.

The frieze combined Ancient Greek, Byzantine, early medieval, and Japanese art styles, while incorporating Klimt's characteristic use of gold leaf. Its left side begins with genii floating toward a knight, driving him to champion the driving force: happiness. The middle panel displays personified threats to the striving (imagined as male) individual, such as lust and sexuality's then feared consequence: syphilis. Controversial in its time, this scene prefigures Picasso's putative brothel scene in Les Demoiselles d'Avignon. The frieze's (as solution to the problem of lust, or libido, gone astray) and culminates choir singing in a loving embrace directly referencing Beethoven's "kiss" of all humanity in his symphony. The symbolism of the frieze was laid out in great detail to the original public through a published exhibition brochure.

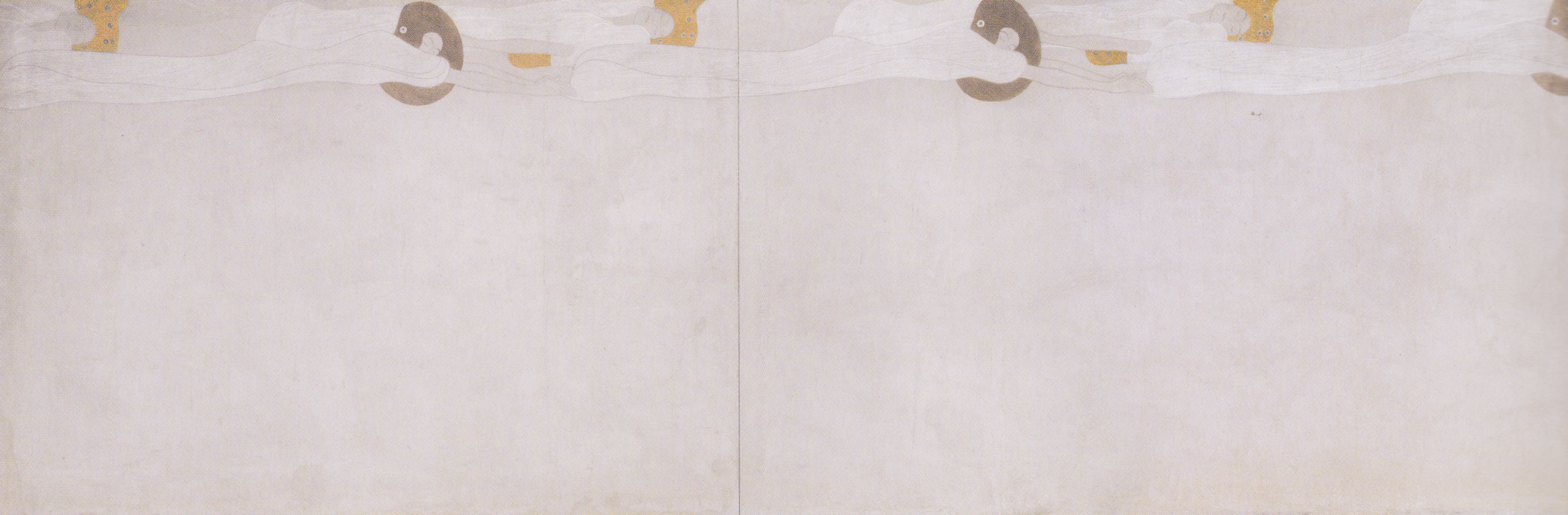
Left wall: "the yearning for happiness; the sufferings of weak mankind; ..."

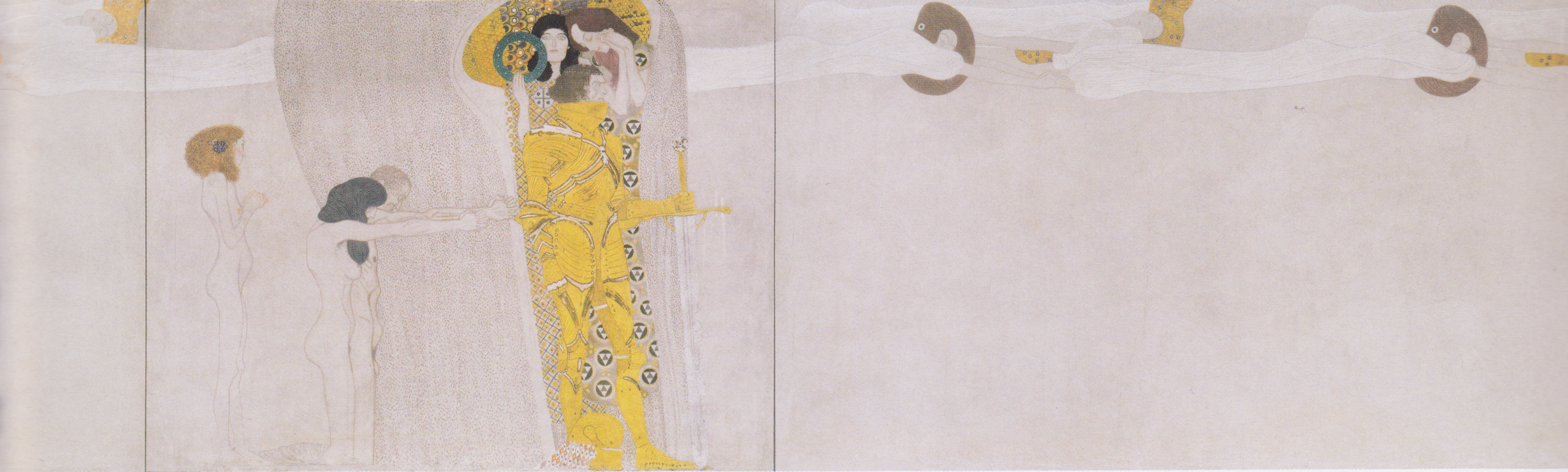
"... their petition to the well-armed strong one, to take up the struggle for happiness, impelled by motives of compassion and ambition.

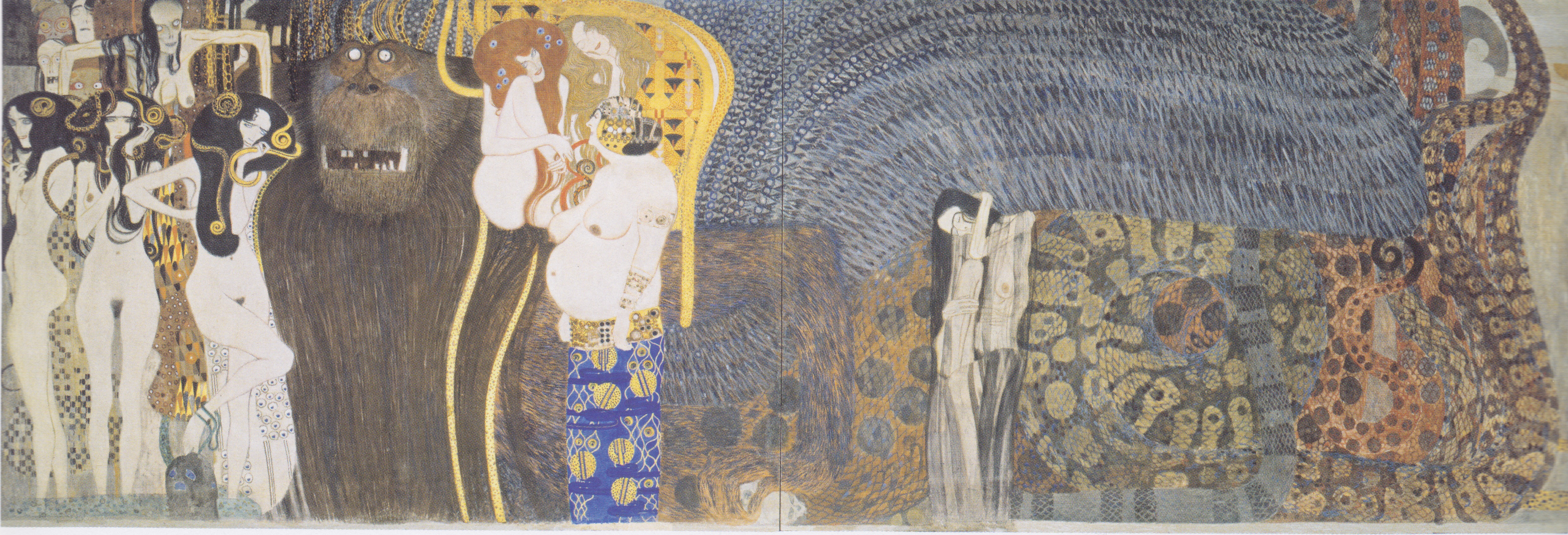
Middle wall: the hostile forces; Typhon the giant, against whom even gods fought in vain; his daughters, the three Gorgons, who symbolize lust and lechery, intemperance and gnawing care. The longings and wishes of mankind fly over their heads."

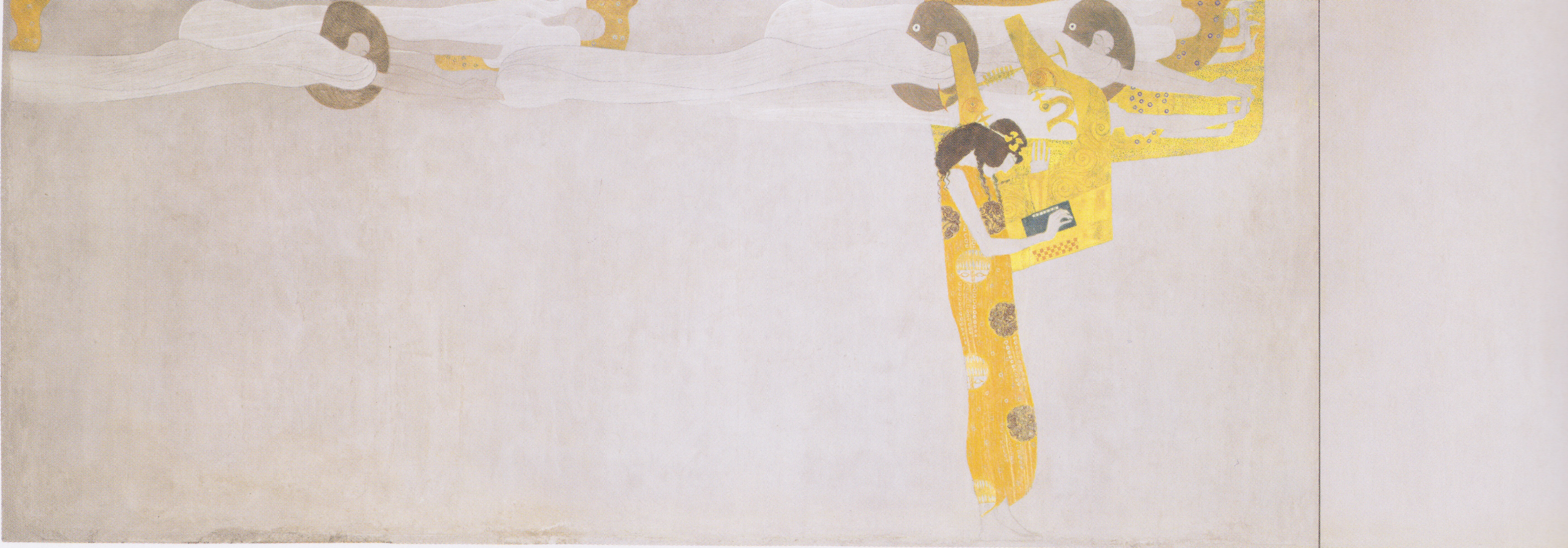
Right wall: "the yearning for happiness is assuaged in poetry. The arts lead us to the ideal realm in which we all can find pure joy, pure happiness, pure love. ..."

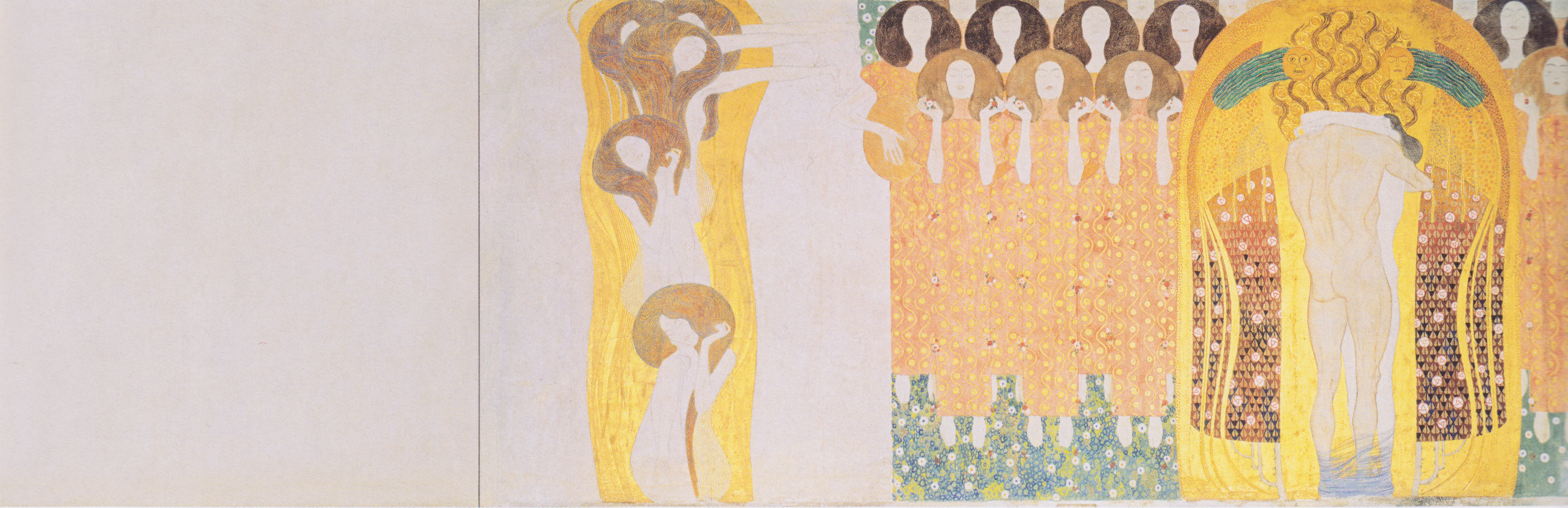
"... Choir of angels from Paradise. 'Joy, lovely spark of heaven's fire, this embrace for all the world."

== History ==
In 1903, art collector Carl Reininghaus acquired the Klimt's Beethoven Frieze to prevent its destruction after the 14th Vienna Secession. In appreciation for preserving his work, Klimt provided Reininghaus with over 100 preparatory sketches, one of which was sold to the Museum of Fine Arts, Boston in 1964. Industrialist August Lederer was encouraged by his wife, Serena, to acquire the frieze and many of these sketches in 1915.

During the 1938 German annexation of Austria, the widowed Serena Lederer was forced to abandon her art collection as she fled to Hungary to avoid Nazi persecution for her Jewish origin. After the painting was recovered by Allied forces from the Altaussee salt mine in Austria in 1945, it was returned to Serena's son, Erich Lederer. In 1973, Erich sold the frieze for $750,000 (half of its purported market value) to the Austrian government in exchange for Chancellor Bruno Kreisky granting export licenses for the Lederer family's other Klimt pieces.

Over ten years, Manfred Koller of the Austrian Federal Monuments Office restored the work. After the Secession Building built a climate-controlled basement room in 1985, the Österreichische Galerie Belvedere permanently loaned the piece, publicly displaying the piece since 1986. In 2020, museum visitors were provided with headphones to hear Beethoven's Ninth Symphony while viewing the frieze in celebration of the composer's 250th birthday.

In 2013, some members of the Lederer family filed a claim for the Beethoven Frieze to be returned. However, the Austrian Art Restitution Advisory Board definitively rejected this request in 2015, finding that Erich Lederer had voluntarily negotiated the sale price and that the Austrian government had significantly invested in its restoration at the Secession Building.

== Commemorative coin ==
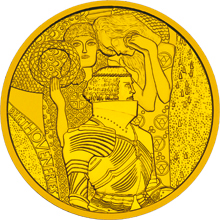
Commemorative 2004 Secession Coin featuring a portion of the frieze

Because of the frieze's fame and popularity, it was made the main motif of a collectors' coin: the Austrian 100 euro Secession Coin, minted on 10 November 2004. The reverse side features a small portion of the frieze. The extract from the painting features three figures: a knight in armor representing "Armored Strength", one woman in the background symbolizing "Ambition" holding up a wreath of victory and a second woman representing "Sympathy" with lowered head and clasped hands.

== See also ==
- List of paintings by Gustav Klimt
