= Secession Building =

- Secessionsgebäude
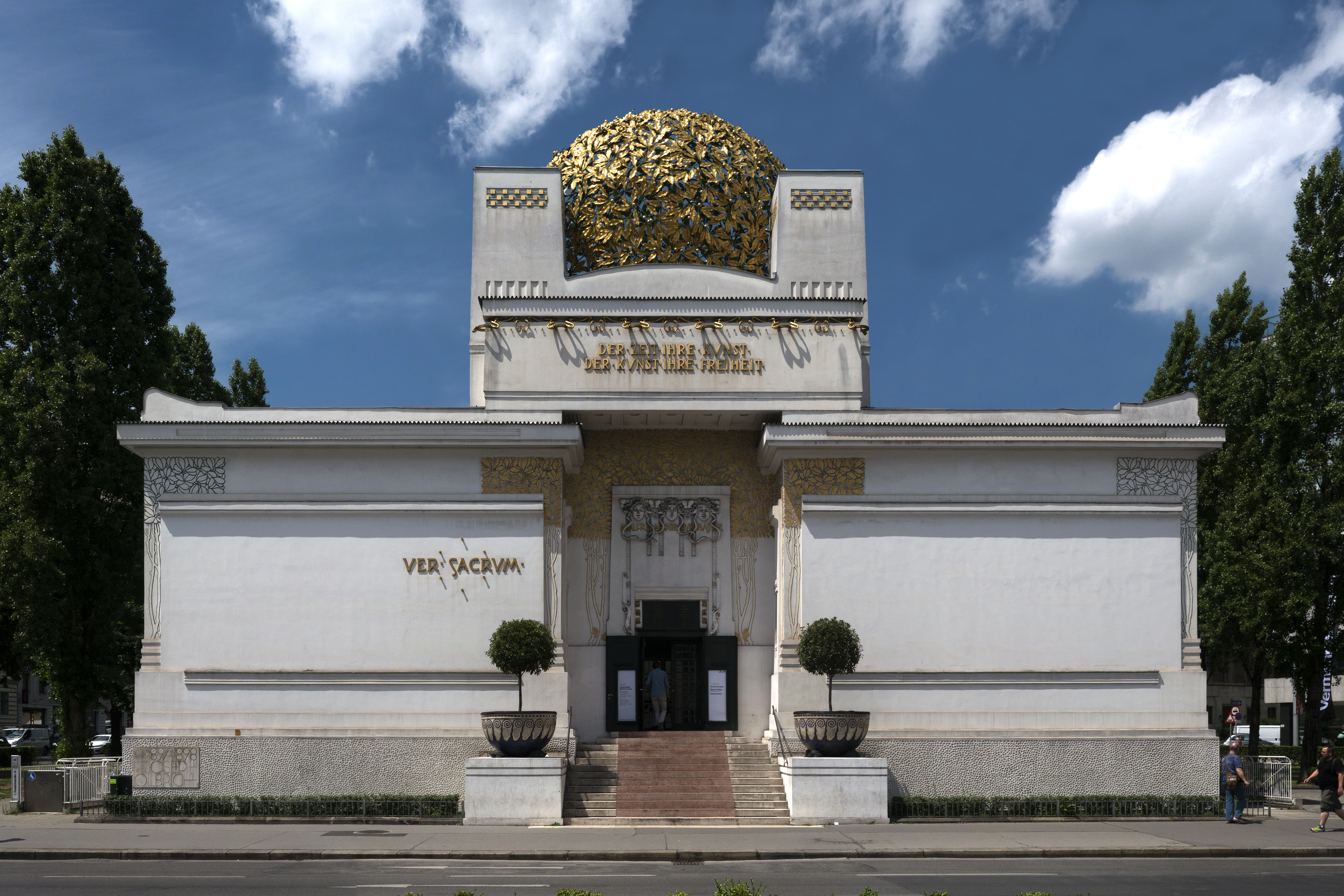
- Main facade of the Secession Building
- Interactive map of the Secession Building area

General information
- Type: Art Exhibition pavilion
- Architectural style: Art Nouveau
- Location: Vienna, Austria
- Coordinates: 48°12′1.86″N 16°21′56.43″E
- Construction started: 1897
- Completed: 1898

Dimensions
- Diameter: 40 m × 30 m (131 ft × 98 ft)

Technical details
- Floor area: 1,000 m^{2} (11,000 sq ft)

Design and construction
- Architect: Joseph Maria Olbrich
- Other designers: Koloman Moser, Gustav Klimt

Website
- www.secession.at

The Secession Building (German: Secessionsgebäude) is a contemporary art exhibition hall in Vienna, Austria. It was completed in 1898 by Joseph Maria Olbrich as an architectural manifesto for the Vienna Secession, a group of rebel artists that seceded from the long-established fine art institution.

== Description ==
The building features the Beethoven Frieze by Gustav Klimt, one of the most widely recognized artworks of Secession style (a branch of Art Nouveau, also known as Jugendstil in Germany and Nordic countries). The building was financed by Karl Wittgenstein, the father of Ludwig Wittgenstein.

The motto of the Secessionist movement is written above the entrance of the pavilion: "To every age its art, to every art its freedom" (German: Der Zeit ihre Kunst. Der Kunst ihre Freiheit). Below this is a sculpture of three gorgons representing painting, sculpture, and architecture.

The building has been selected to figure on the national side of the €0.50 Austrian coin. It also appears as the main motif of one of the Austrian gold collectors' coins: the 100 euro Secession commemorative coin, minted in November 2004, on the obverse side. The reverse depicts a detail from the Beethoven Frieze, which is housed in the building.

The Secession building is currently an artist-run kunsthalle centred around international contemporary art.

== Images ==
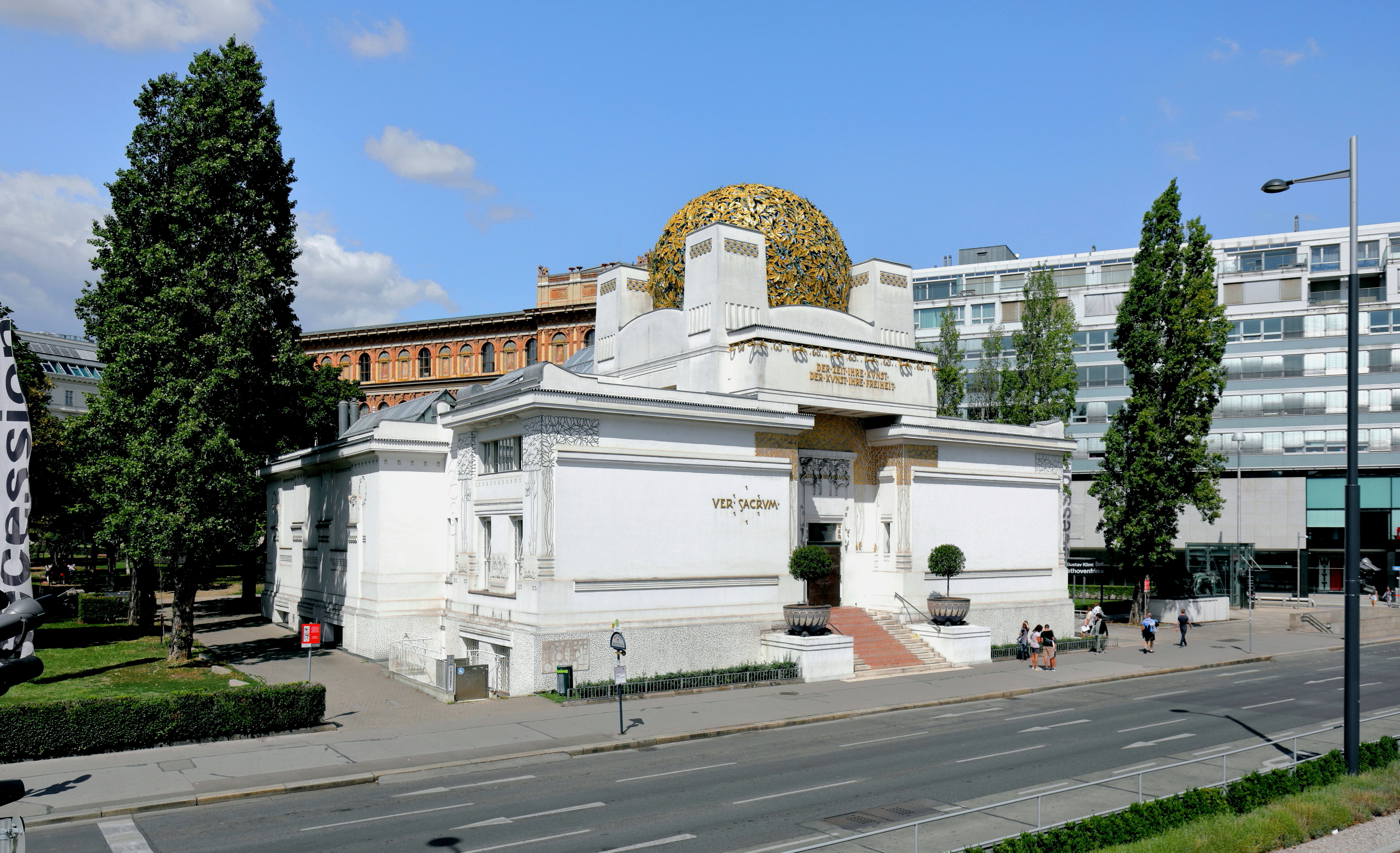
The Secession Building in 2017

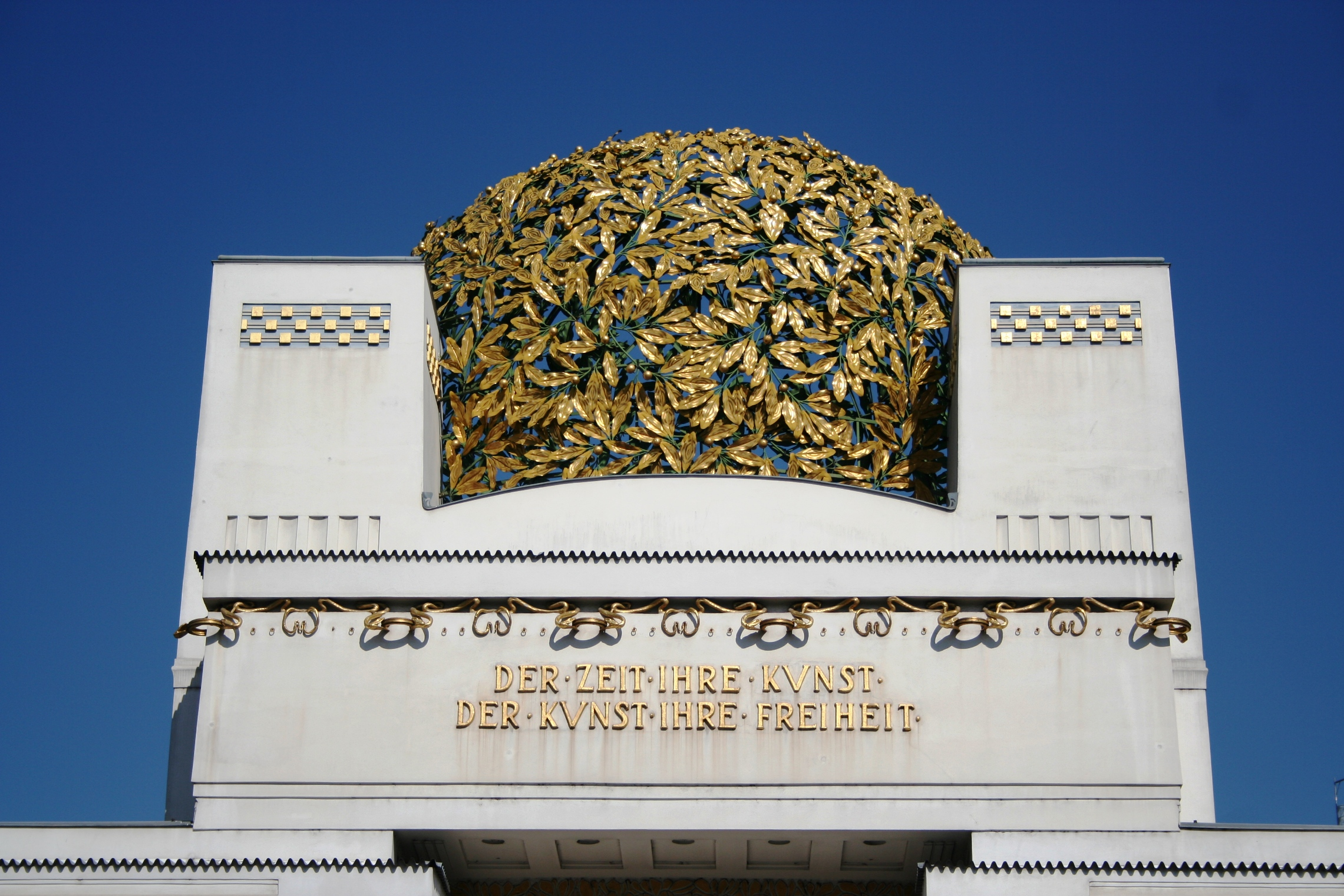
Secession Building façade

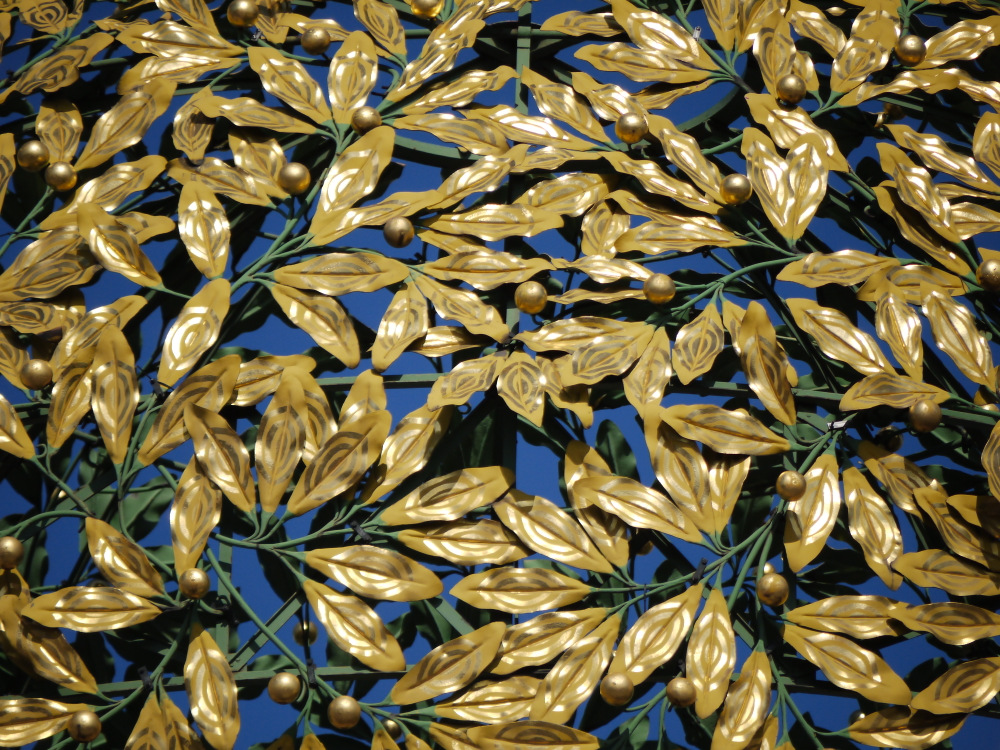
Foliage work detail

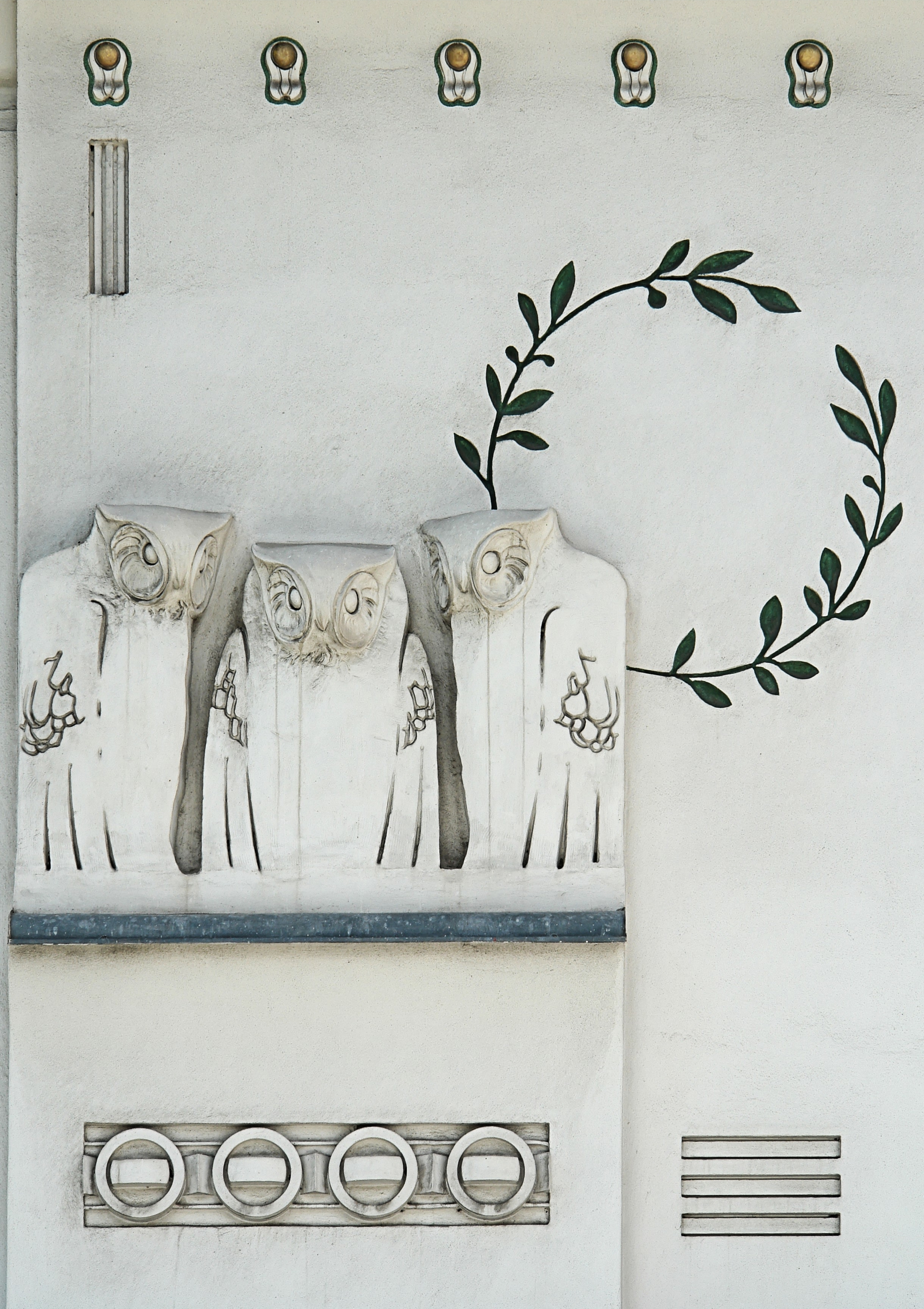
Jugendstil owls on the façade by Koloman Moser

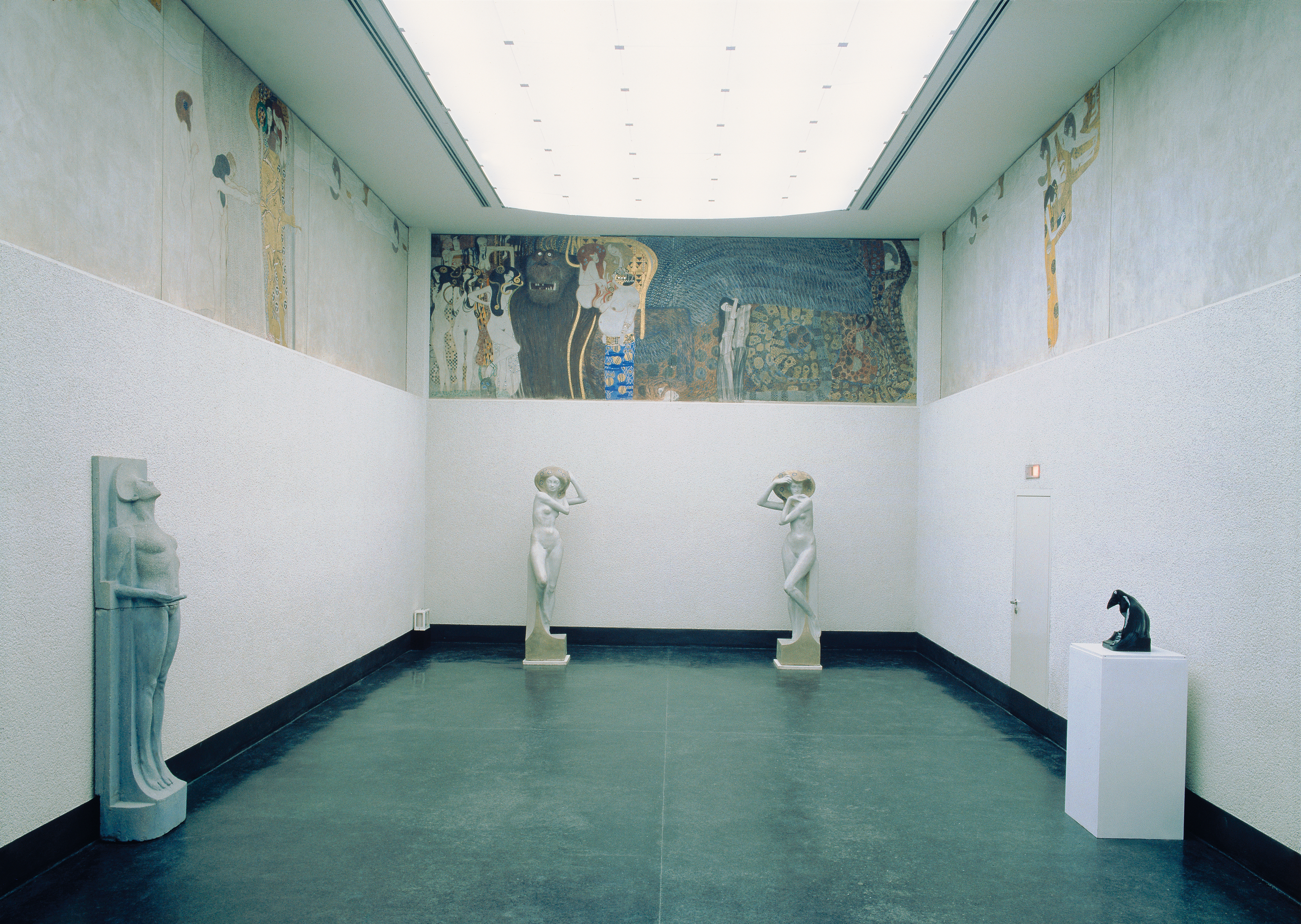
The Beethoven Frieze, created by Gustav Klimt, is housed in the lower floor.

Painting, Architecture, and Sculpture

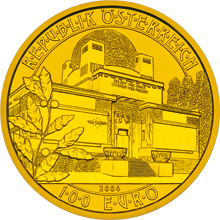
The Secession commemorative coin

== Influences ==
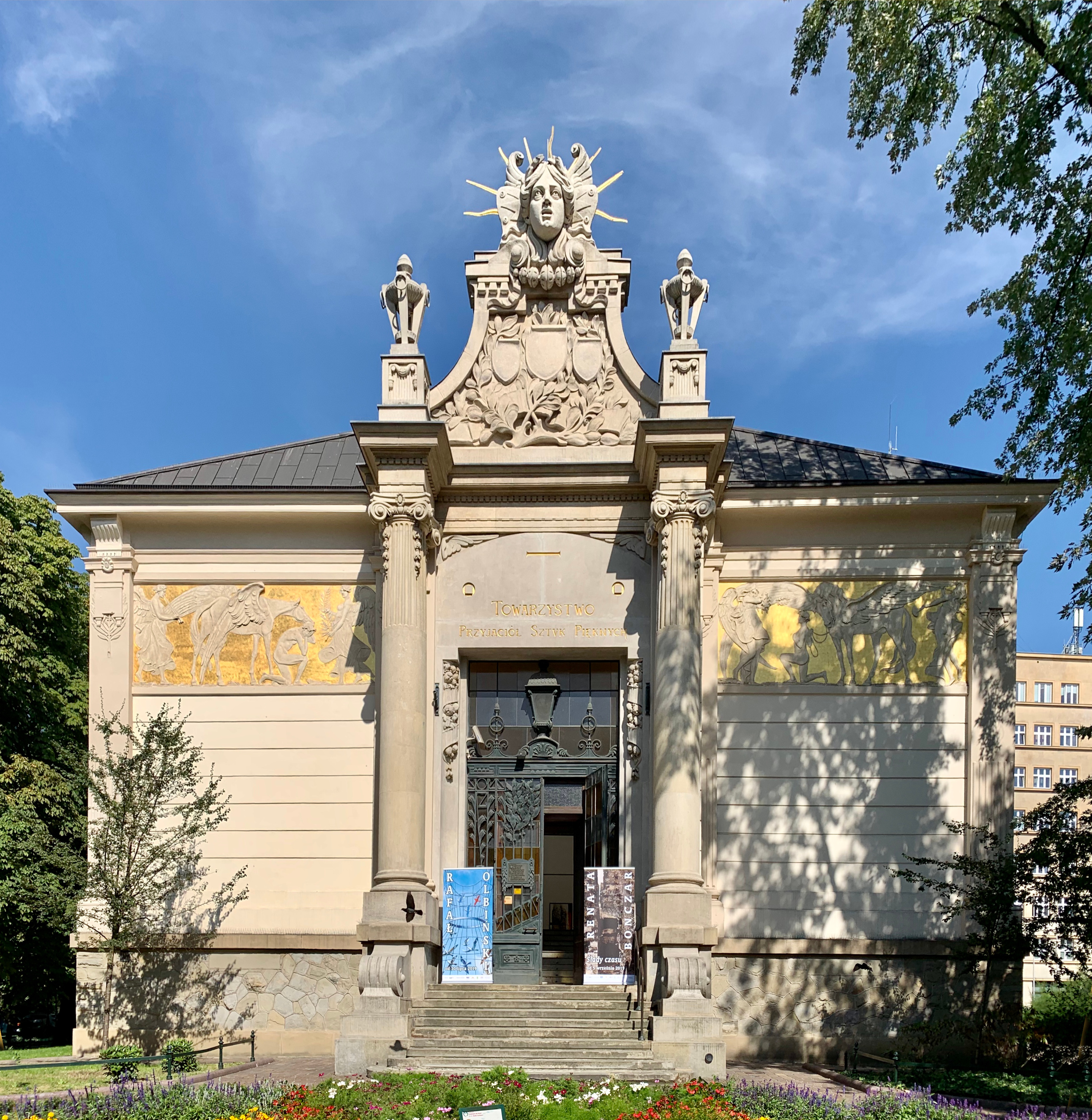
Palace of Art, also known as "Secession", of the Kraków Society of Friends of Fine Arts, in Krakow Old Town

Young Poland (Polish: Młoda Polska) was a modernist period in Polish visual arts, literature and music, covering roughly the years between 1890 and 1918 during Austria-Hungary. Many of the exhibitions were held at the Palace of Art, also known as "Secession", of the Kraków Society of Friends of Fine Arts, in Krakow Old Town.
