= Eduard Josef Wimmer-Wisgrill =

Austrian industrial designer

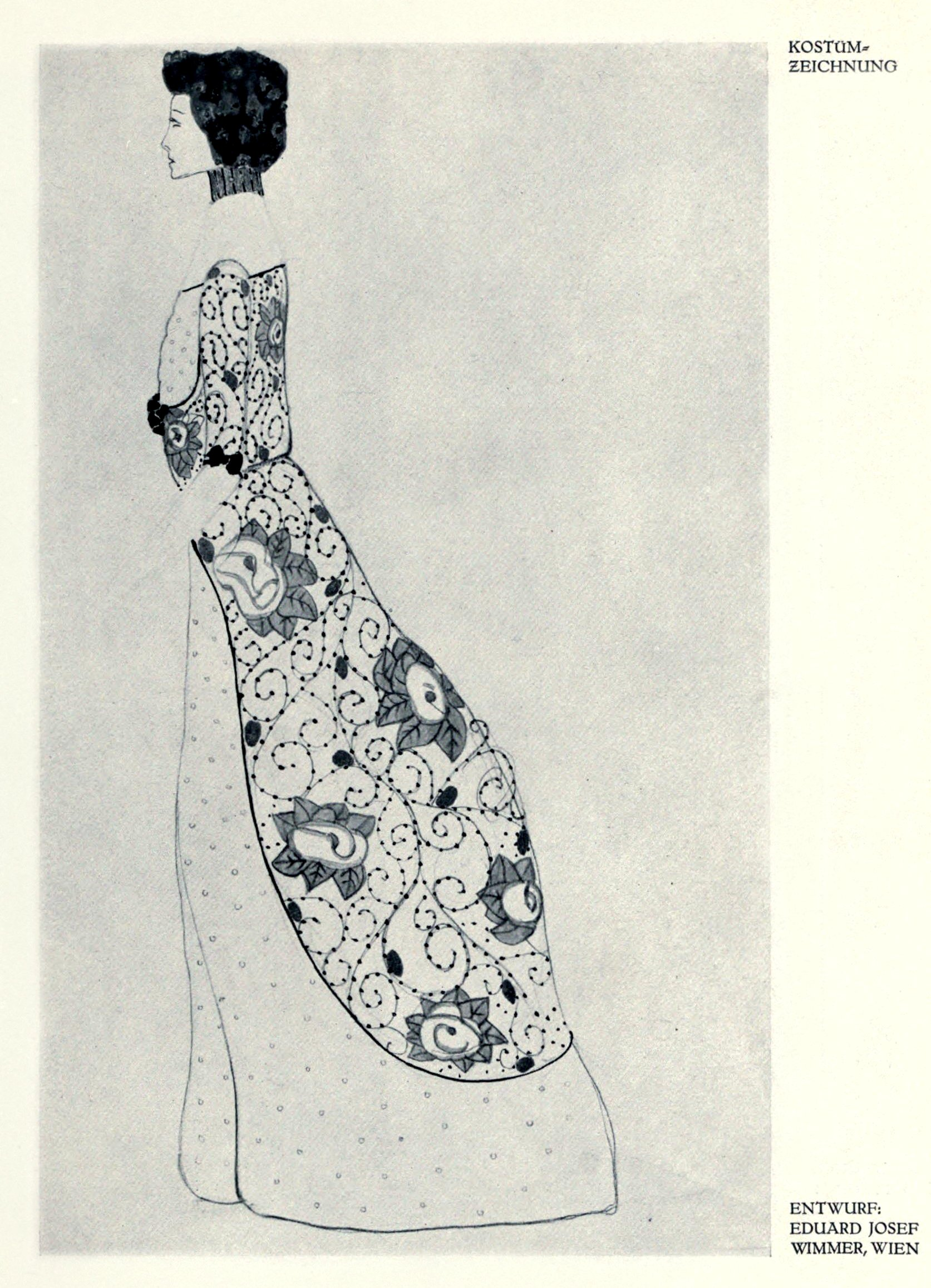
Costume design drawn by Eduard Wimmer-Wisgrill, 1912

Eduard Josef Wimmer-Wisgrill (2 April 1882 – December 1961) was an Austrian industrial designer, architect, and fashion designer. He was active in the first half of the 20th century. Wimmer is best known for his work in jewelry and garments for the Wiener Werkstätte, as well as for his contributions to the field of modern architecture.

== Biography ==
Eduard Josef Wimmer-Wisgrill was born in Vienna, Austria on 2 April 1882. He studied at the Academy of Fine Arts Vienna, and developed an interest in the convergence of art, design and technology. Wimmer studied architecture and began his career as a freelance industrial designer, creating mostly furniture and other household items.

He turned his hand to design in fashion, jewelry, and metalwork, training under Josef Hoffmann, who later invited him to join the workshops. In 1910 he joined the Wiener Werkstätte as an "artistic collaborator". Quickly, he became one of Austria's leading designers in the 1920s and 1930s, working for major companies and gaining renown both domestically and internationally for his simple, functional, and modern designs for furniture and household goods.

Wimmer also taught for many years. From 1912 to 1913, Wimmer-Wisgrill worked as an assistant professor under Koloman Moser at the Kunstgewerbeschule (School of Applied Arts). He was appointed as full professor at the school in 1918 and headed the fashion department until 1921. After leaving Vienna in 1922, he spent time in Paris before traveling to the United States, where he visited Joseph Urban at the New York branch of the Wiener Werkstätte. In New York, he worked as a fashion, costume, and textile designer for nearly a year before briefly teaching at the Art Institute of Chicago in 1923.

Upon returning to Vienna in 1924, he resumed teaching at the Kunstgewerbeschule and headed the fashion and textile department from 1925 until his retirement in 1953. Despite officially retiring in 1955, he continued to paint landscapes and floral subjects until his death in Vienna in December 1961. Although his work was somewhat forgotten after his death, there has been a renewed appreciation for it in recent years, and his designs and architecture are now recognized as a significant example of the intersection of art, design, and technology in the early 20th century.

== The Wiener Werkstatte ==
In 1910, the Wiener Werkstätte applied for a dressmaking license and that summer began selling women's fashion in the spa resort of Karlsbad (today, Karlovy Vary in the Czech Republic). It was rumored that the creation of the Wiener Werkstatte’s fashion department was a result of Wimmer’s visit to the Stoclet Palace in Brussels, which had been entirely designed by Hoffman. He was apparently surprised by Madame Stoclet’s French-designed garments, the only items not signed by Hoffman, which he felt broke the harmony of the home’s design.

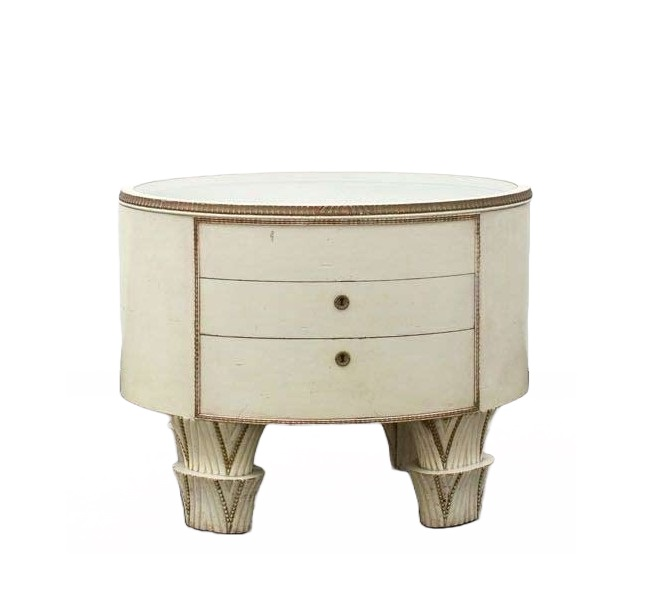
Oval dresser from an ensemble of bedroom and dressing room furniture for the Lederer family by Eduard Wimmer-Wisgrill, Exposition MAK 12.9.–25.11.2012

After Stoclet Palace, the furnishings for the art collectors August and Serena Lederer had been entrusted to Eduard Wimmer-Wisgrill und produced by the Wiener Werkstätte. In March 1914 he became a partner in the Wiener Werkstätte.

During his stay in Karlsbad, Wimmer wrote to Hoffman that although the “business itself was rather fun ... the female junk and clients milling around was just about the limit”, likely referring to the accumulation of textiles in the Karlsbad workshops. The first collection was shown in February 1911, quickly propelling the fashion department to one of the most successful branches of the organization. Wimmer was responsible for dress designs, along with Max Snischek and Otto Lendecke, while over 80 designers created textiles, lace, needlework, and beadwork.

However, the dresses often remained at the project stage, and the commercial results were mediocre due to their focus on conceiving sketches of clothing that were too complex to actually produce rather than realistic and wearable fashion designs. The firm was reorganized as a limited liability company in 1914 after losing its first financial backer, Fritz Waerndorfer. When Wimmer moved to the United States in 1922, Max Snischek took over as head of the fashion department.

== Design work ==
Wimmer’s couture was praised for its originality. In his designs, he integrated less geometry than his predecessors Hoffman and Moser. His work was heavily inspired by nature, often including floral shapes, leaves and plant-like patterns. He was also inspired by non-traditional folk textiles. He frequently used ‘harem trousers,’ which resembled bloomers and were representative of the period.

The famed French designer Paul Poiret visited Vienna as the Werkstatte released its first fashion collections in 1911. Poiret returned later that year because he had liked Wimmer’s designs so much, and bought many of them to bring back to Paris. He even used some of the Werkstatte’s textiles in his own work. Wimmer's influence on Poiret was mutual; Wimmer was dubbed the “Poiret of the Viennese” by the press, due to his Parisian-style silhouettes.

Wimmer also designed a number of buildings in Vienna and other cities in Austria. His architectural work was mostly inspired by the Modernism movement in art and architecture. For that reason, Wimmer is considered one of the fathers of modern architecture in Austria.
