= Klimt University of Vienna Ceiling Paintings =

Series of paintings made by Gustav Klimt

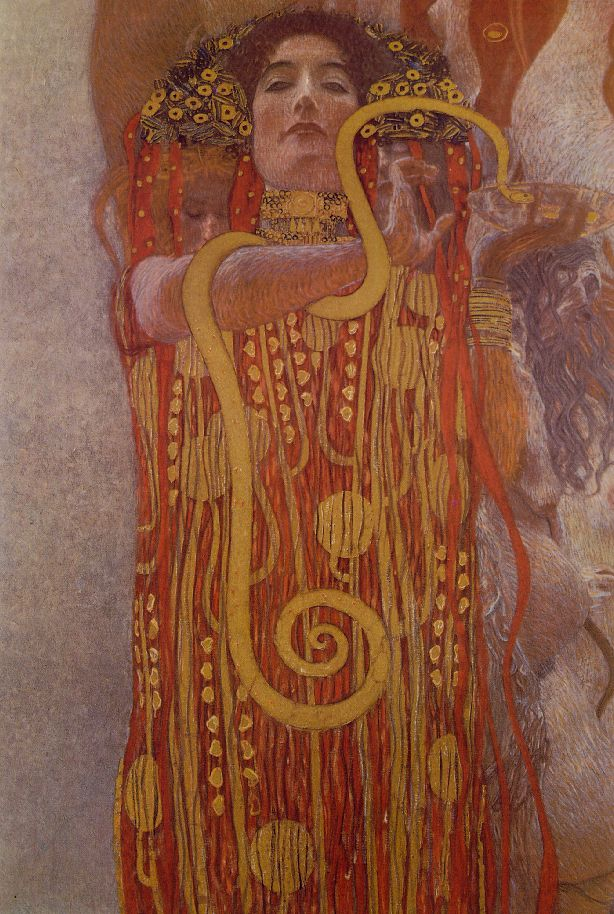
- The bottom portion of the Medicine picture, showing Hygieia
- Artist: Gustav Klimt
- Year: 1900–1907
- Location: Destroyed

The Klimt University of Vienna Ceiling Paintings, also known as the Faculty Paintings, were a series of paintings made by Gustav Klimt for the ceiling of the University of Vienna's Great Hall between 1900 and 1907. In 1894, Klimt was commissioned to paint the ceiling. Upon presenting his paintings, Philosophy, Medicine and Jurisprudence, Klimt came under attack for 'pornography' and 'perverted excess' in the paintings. None of the paintings went on display in the university.

It is believed that all three paintings were destroyed at the end of World War II when retreating SS forces set fire to Schloss Immendorf, where they were housed, though this is not conclusively verified.

== Philosophy ==
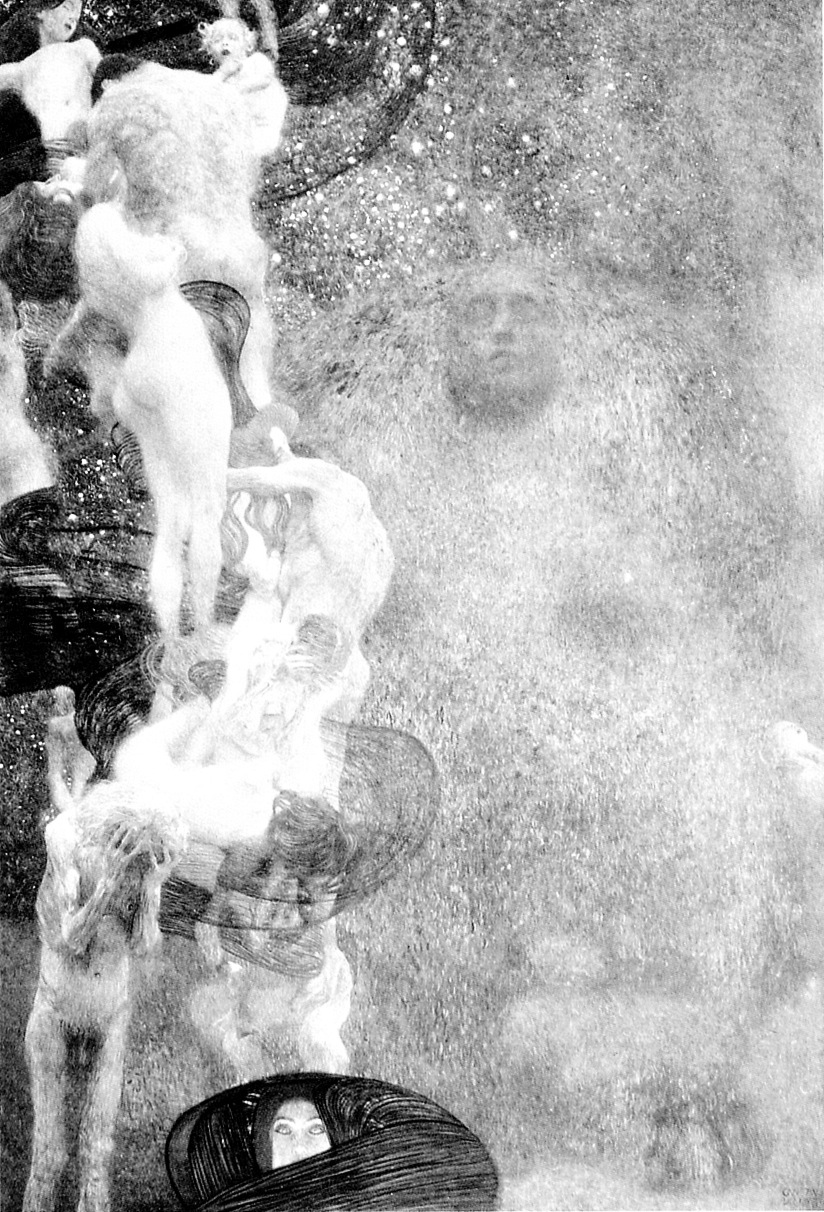
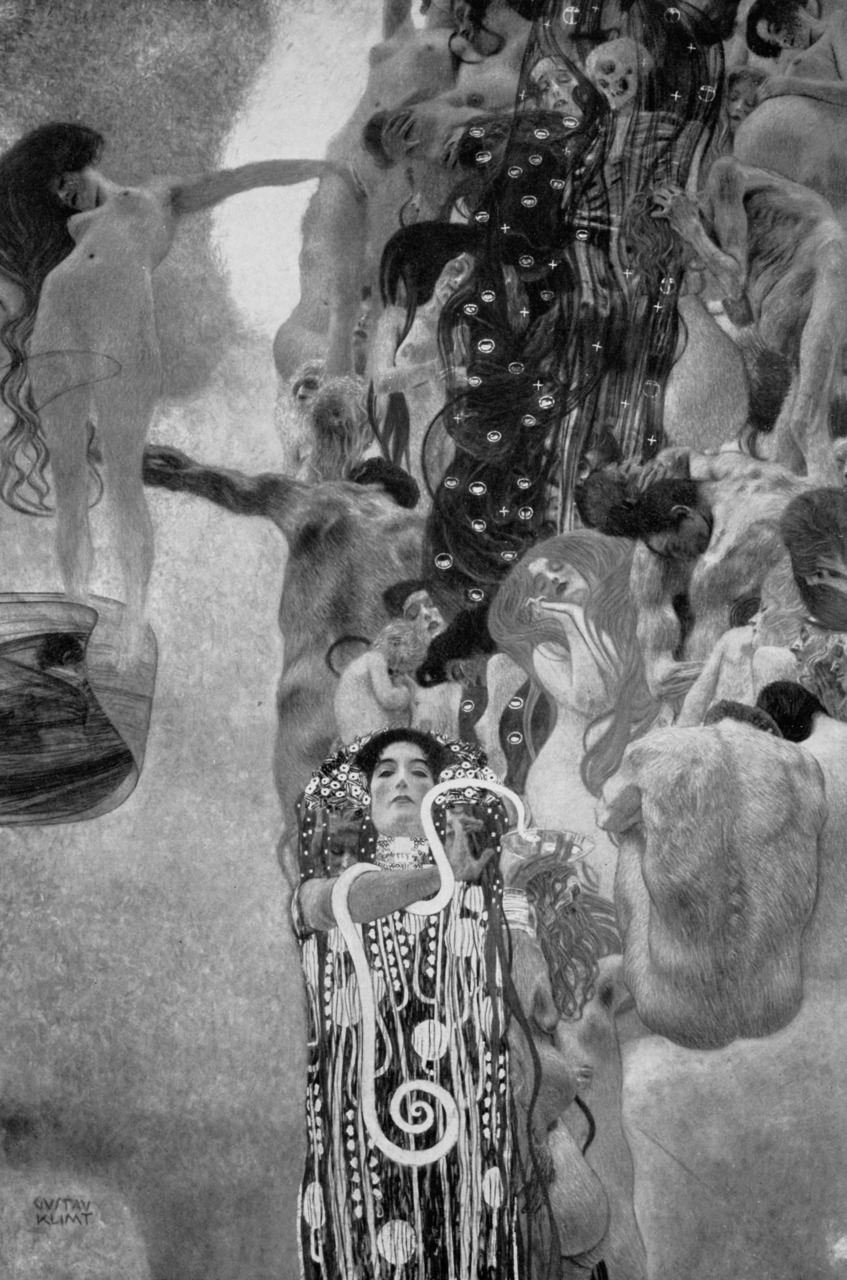
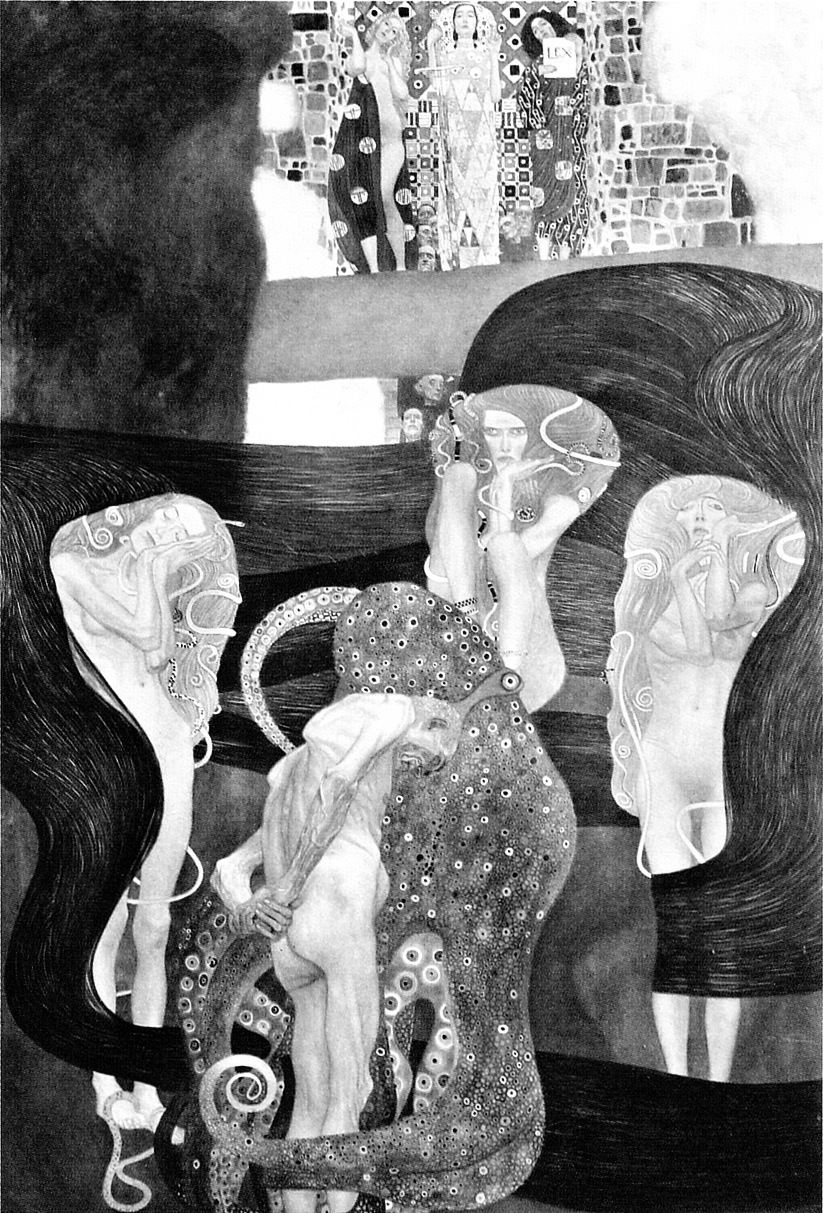
Philosophy (1900–1907), Medicine (1900–1907), and Jurisprudence (1903, final version 1907).

Philosophy was the first of the three pictures presented to the Austrian Government at the seventh Vienna Secession exhibition in March 1900. It had been awarded a gold medal at the World Exhibition in Paris, but was attacked by many art critics in his own country. Klimt described the painting as follows: "On the left a group of figures, the beginning of life, fruition, decay. On the right, the globe as mystery. Emerging below, a figure of light: knowledge." Critics were disturbed by its depiction of men and women drifting in an aimless trance. The original proposal for the theme of the painting was "The Victory of Light over Darkness", but what Klimt presented instead was a dreamlike mass of humanity, referring neither to optimism nor rationalism, but to a "viscous void".

== Medicine ==
Medicine was the second painting, presented in March 1901 at the tenth Secession Exhibition. It featured a column of semi-nude figures on the right hand side of the painting, representing the river of life. Beside it was a young nude female who floated in space, with a newborn infant at her feet, representing life. A skeleton represented death in the river of life. The only link between the floating woman and the river of bodies is two arms, the woman's and a man's as seen from behind. At the bottom of the painting Hygieia stood with the Aesculapian snake around her arm and the cup of Lethe in her hand, turning her back to mankind. Klimt conveyed an ambiguous unity of life and death, with nothing to celebrate the role of medicine or the science of healing. Upon display of the painting in 1901, Klimt was attacked by critics. An editorial in the Medizinische Wochenschrift complained that the painter had ignored doctors' two main achievements, prevention and cure.

== Jurisprudence ==
Jurisprudence, too, is laden with anxiety: a condemned man is depicted surrounded by three female furies and a sea monster, while in the background, the three goddesses of Truth, Justice, and Law look on. They are shown as the Eumenides, punishing the condemned man with an octopus's deadly embrace. The conflict in Jurisprudence has been seen as "psycho-sexual".

== Reaction ==
The Faculty Paintings were attacked by critics when they were presented, as each painting broke different cultural taboos. In particular, the response to Medicine was highly critical. The paintings contradicted the trend of the era to "sublimate reality and to only present its more favourable aspects" (Neret). The paintings also drew the standard charges of obscenity which Klimt often faced. Eighty-seven faculty members protested against the murals, and in 1901 a public prosecutor was called in and the issue even reached the Parliament of Austria, the first time that a cultural debate had ever been raised there, but in the end no action was taken. Only the education minister defended Klimt, and when Klimt was elected to be a professor at the Academy of Fine Arts in 1901 the government refused to ratify the action. He was never offered another teaching position. This would also be the last time Klimt would accept commissions from the state, remarking: "I've had enough of censorship ... I reject all state support, I don't want any of it."

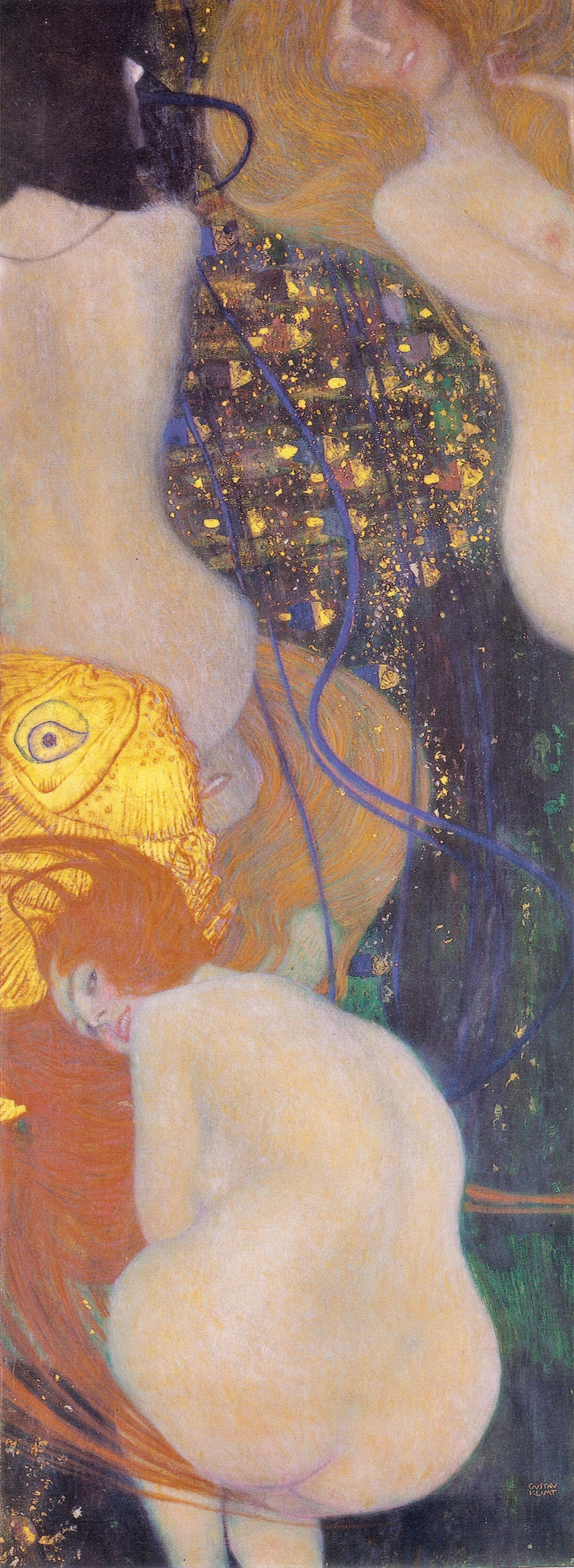
Goldfish 1901-1902

A later painting of his entitled Goldfish (to my critics) (1901–1902), which showed a smiling, beautiful woman projecting her bottom at the viewer, was a response to all those who attacked the 'pornography' and 'perverted excess' of the University paintings. Animated by resentment, Klimt wanted to title the painting "To my critics", but was dissuaded by friends.

In 1903, Hermann Bahr, a writer and a supporter of Klimt, in response to the criticism of the Faculty Paintings collected the articles that had attacked Klimt, and published a book Gegen Klimt (Against Klimt) with his foreword, where he argued that the reactions to Klimt's works were absurd.

== Outcome and destruction ==
The paintings were requested for the Louisiana Purchase Exposition in 1904 in St. Louis, Missouri, but the ministry declined, nervous of what the reaction might be. On 11 November 1903, the artistic commission of the ministry of education examined the projects for the panels of the University's Great Hall. Klimt's were welcomed, unlike Matsch's. However, it was proposed not to exhibit them in the Great Hall, but in the Österreichische Galerie. Klimt rejected the proposal: On 3 April 1905 he wrote to the ministry resigning his commission, wishing to keep his work, but the ministry insisted they were already property of the state. Only when Klimt threatened the removal staff with a shotgun was he able to keep his painting. Klimt repaid his advance of 30,000 crowns with the support of August Lederer, one of his major patrons, who in return received Philosophy. In 1911 Medicine and Jurisprudence were bought by Klimt's friend and fellow artist, Koloman Moser. Medicine eventually came into the possession of a Jewish family, and in 1938 the painting was seized by Nazi Germany. In 1943, after a final exhibition, they were moved to Schloss Immendorf, a castle in Lower Austria, for protection.

In May 1945, the paintings are believed to have been destroyed as retreating German SS forces set fire to the castle to prevent it from falling into enemy hands. However, while the castle was gutted, there is no proof that the paintings were destroyed, as the art historian Tina Marie Storkovich found out. As far as is known, all that remains now are preparatory sketches and a few photographs. Only one photograph remains of the complete painting of Medicine, taken just before it was destroyed.

== Reconstruction ==
By the end of 2021, a collaboration between Google and the Leopold Museum of Vienna restored using deep learning techniques the possible colour of the three works based on Klimt's works. This resulted in a possible appearance as the result needed to be retouched by experts in Klimt's art.

== Gallery ==
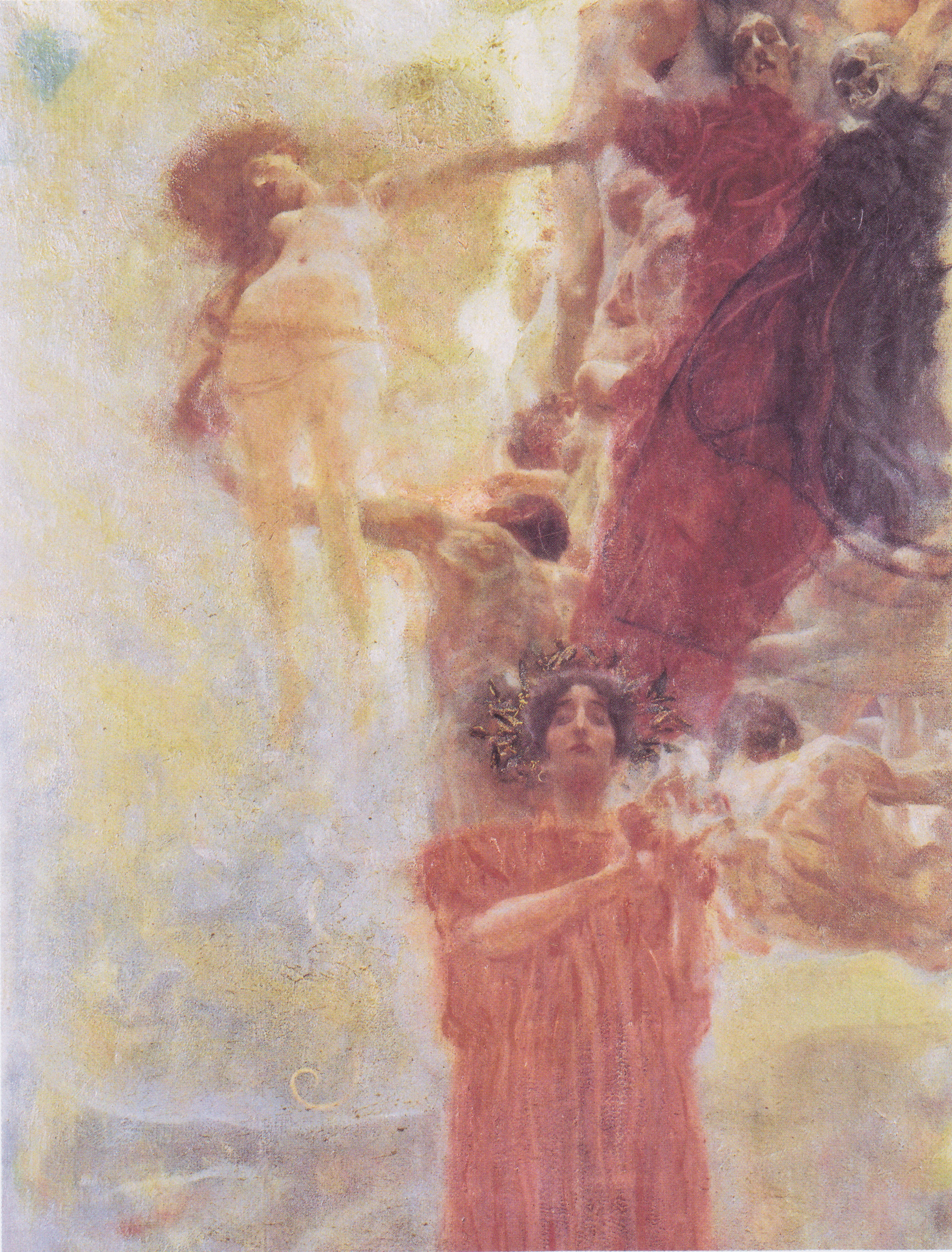
Composition for Medicine

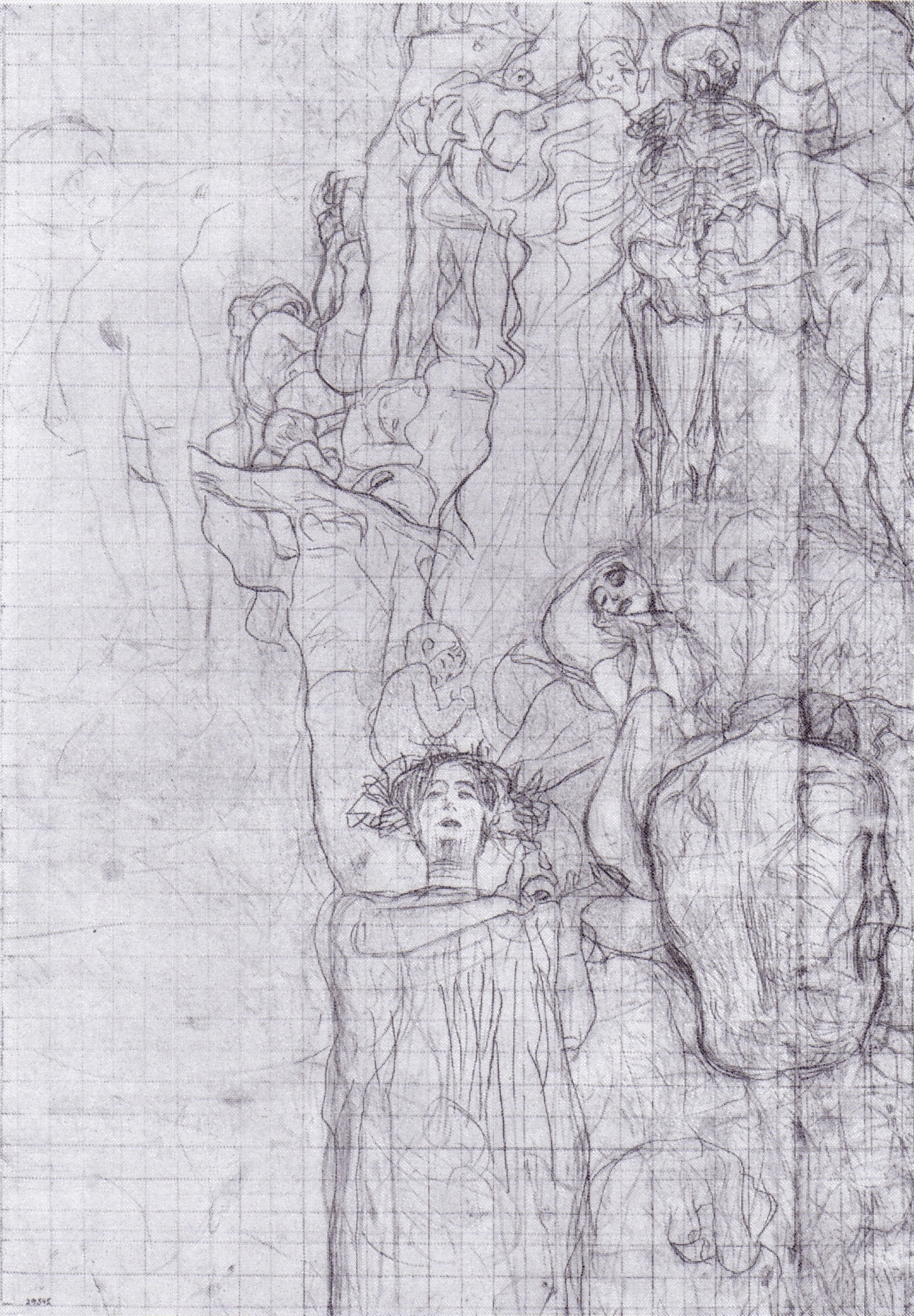
Study for Medicine

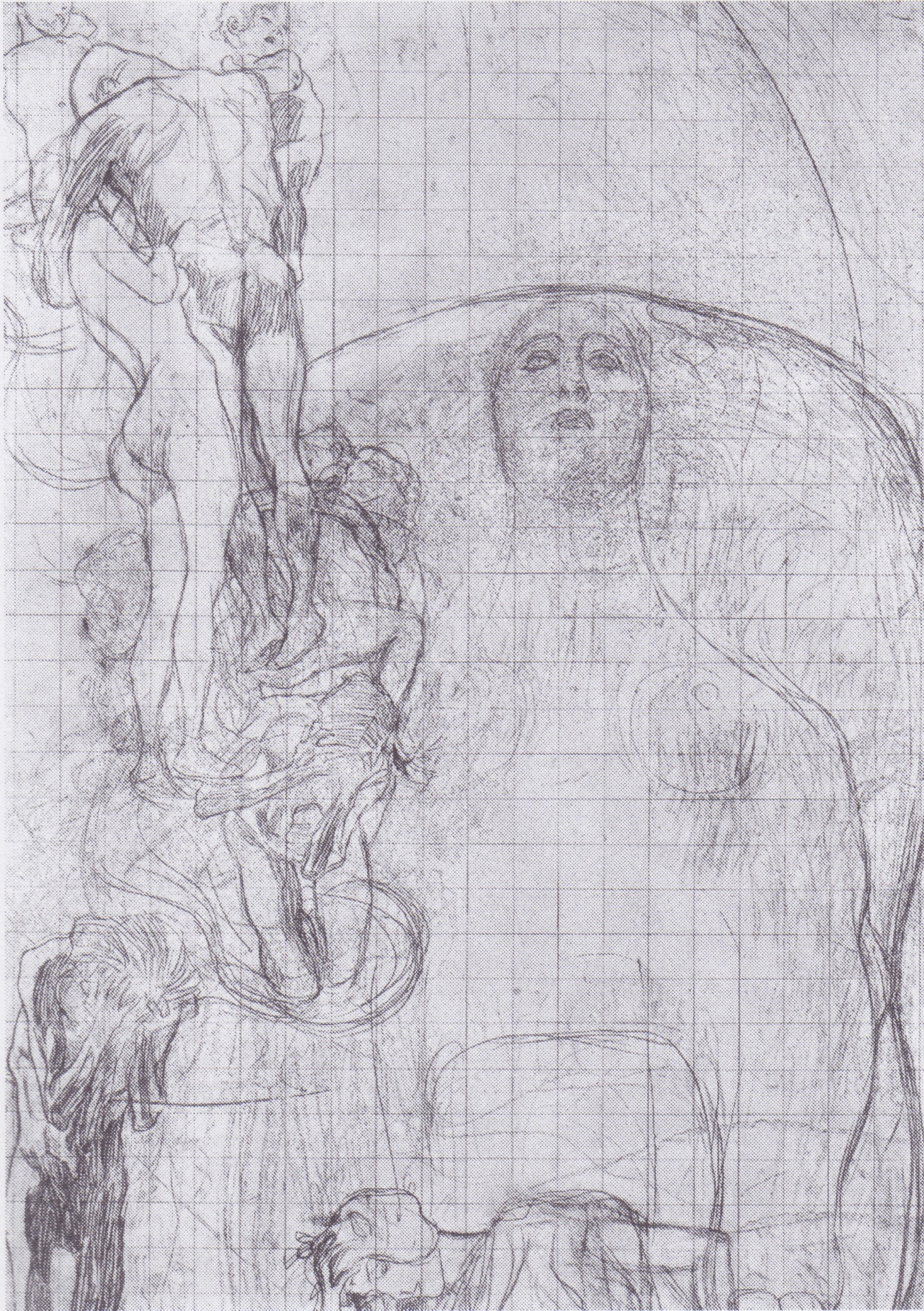
Study for Philosophy

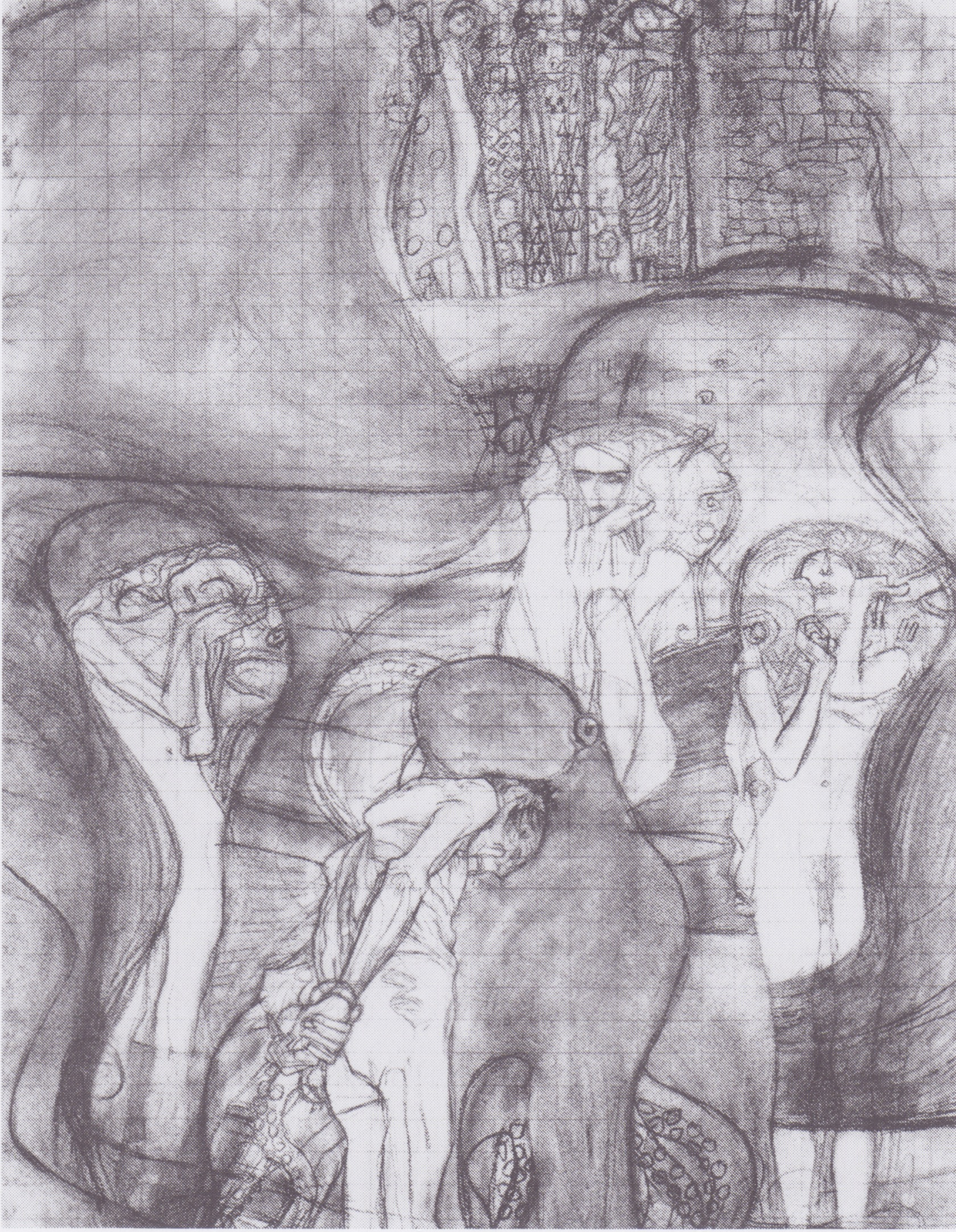
Study for Jurisprudence

== See also ==
- List of paintings by Gustav Klimt
