= Schloss Immendorf =

Former castle in Lower Austria, destroyed 1945

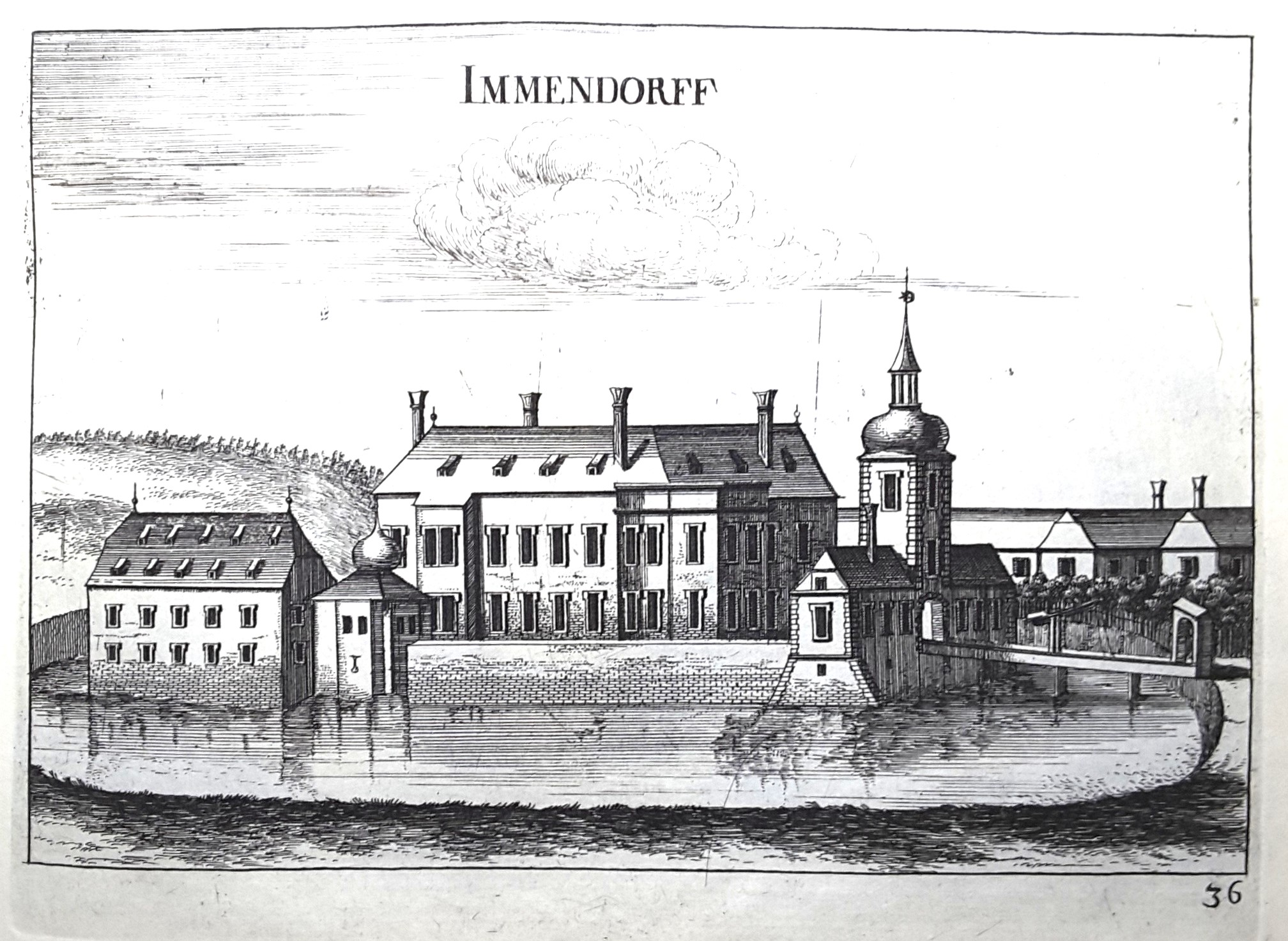
Schloss Immendorf in the Topographia Austriae inferioris, 1672. Engraving by Georg Matthäus Vischer.

Schloss Immendorf was a castle in the village of Immendorf near the market town of Wullersdorf in the district of Hollabrunn in the northeast of Lower Austria, within the Weinviertel region.

From 1942 to May 1945, the Institut für Denkmalpflege (present day Bundesdenkmalamt, Vienna) rented rooms at Immendorf Castle for the purpose of storing art objects that included furniture from the Museum of Applied Arts in Vienna and the confiscated Lederer Klimt Collection. On 8 May 1945, on the last day of World War II in Europe, the castle somehow caught on fire, presumably by the retreating German army, but not necessarily the SS as has been heretofore believed, and art stolen by the Nazis and paintings by Gustav Klimt stored therein were lost.

== History ==
Early owners include Bernhard von Immendorf and the Palterndorfers. Matthias Palterndorfer appears in the tax records in 1529.

The castle was the seat of knightly followers who repeatedly adapted the building. In 1850, the last conversion of the plant took place, during which the moat was embedded. In 1886 Carl Freiherr von Freudenthal, from an old-noble Silesian family, acquired Schloss Immendorf. In the 20th century the small three-storey Kastellburg had four higher towers.

After the fire in 1945, the ruins were vandalized for its building stone and the castle reduced to its foundation walls. In 1955, the Freudenthal family had the ruins torn down.

== Art store ==
From 1942 to 1945, the Institüt für Denkmalpflege (currently the Bundesdenkmalamt, Vienna) rented rooms in Immendorf Castle for the purpose of storing art from various art collections including objects from the MAK, the art collection of the von Suttner family, and the confiscated Lederer Klimt Collection. On 8 May 1945, the last day of the war in the region, the castle caught on fire presumably started by the retreating "Feldherrnhalle"—a tank corps of the German army. It has been assumed that this fire destroyed all the objects which had been relocated to the castle for safe storage.

The losses included an important sequence of paintings by Gustav Klimt, the Klimt University of Vienna Ceiling Paintings of 1900 to 1907. It seems that the only remains of this particular collection of Klimt´s work are preparatory sketches many of which are in the collections of the Albertina (Vienna) and a few photographs (originally in the hands of Welz Gallery, Salzburg) but now in the ÖNB (Vienna).

== See also ==
- Lost artworks
