= Lady with a Fan (Klimt) =

1918 painting by Gustav Klimt

- Dame mit Fächer (German)
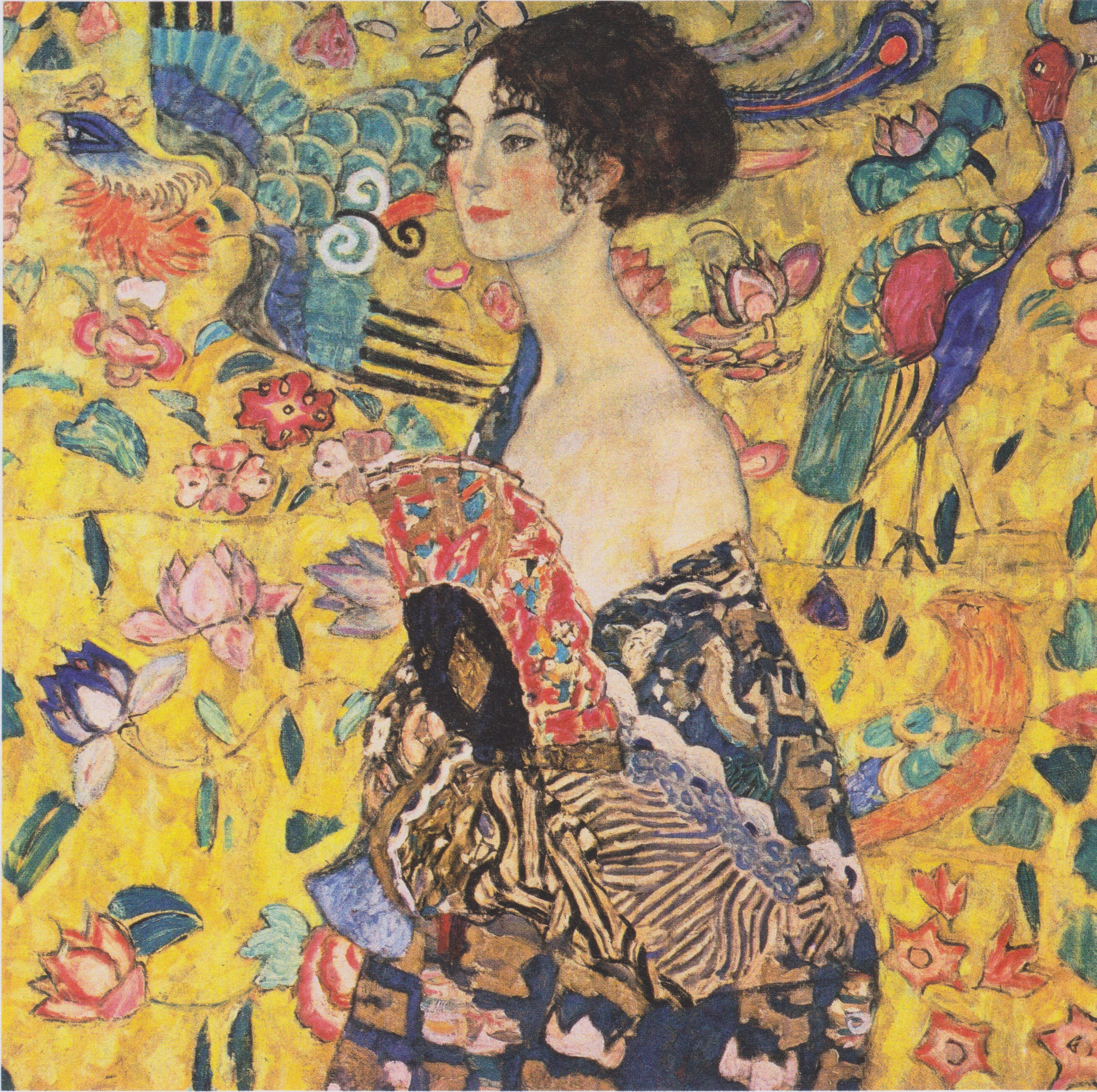
- Artist: Gustav Klimt
- Year: 1917–1918
- Medium: Oil on canvas
- Dimensions: 100.2 cm × 100.2 cm (39.4 in × 39.4 in)
- Location: Private collection

Lady with a Fan (German: Dame mit Fächer) was the final portrait created by the Austrian painter Gustav Klimt. Painted in 1917, the uncommissioned piece depicting an unidentified woman was on an easel in his studio when he died in 1918. Like many of Klimt's late works, it incorporates strong Asian influences including many Chinese motifs.

In June 2023, it sold at auction with Sotheby's in London for £85.3 million ($108.4 million, €99.2 million), the highest price ever achieved in Europe for a work of art at the time. It was bought by art dealer Patti Wong on behalf of a Hong Kong collector.

== Description ==
The square painting depicts a woman with chestnut curls against a yellow backdrop with Oriental motifs. As she gazes into the distance to the left, her patterned silk robe is slipping off her shoulder and she holds a fan concealing her bosom.

The Chinese motifs in the background include a large flying phoenix, a symbol of immortality, rebirth, and good fortune, and bright pink lotus blossoms, which are associated with love and immutable beauty. A long-legged crane and a golden pheasant are also present. The flatness of the background patterns evokes Japanese ukiyo-e woodblock prints, while the colours imitate the chrome yellow, cobalt blue, and red ochre of enameled Chinese porcelain.

The identity of the sitter is unknown, with speculation that the model could be Johanna Staude, Klimt's life companion Emilie Flöge, or one of his favourite dancers. According to the Belvedere Museum Vienna, the painting was exhibited under the title of Dancer (Tänzerin) shortly after it was created, suggesting that the model may have been a ballet or music hall dancer.

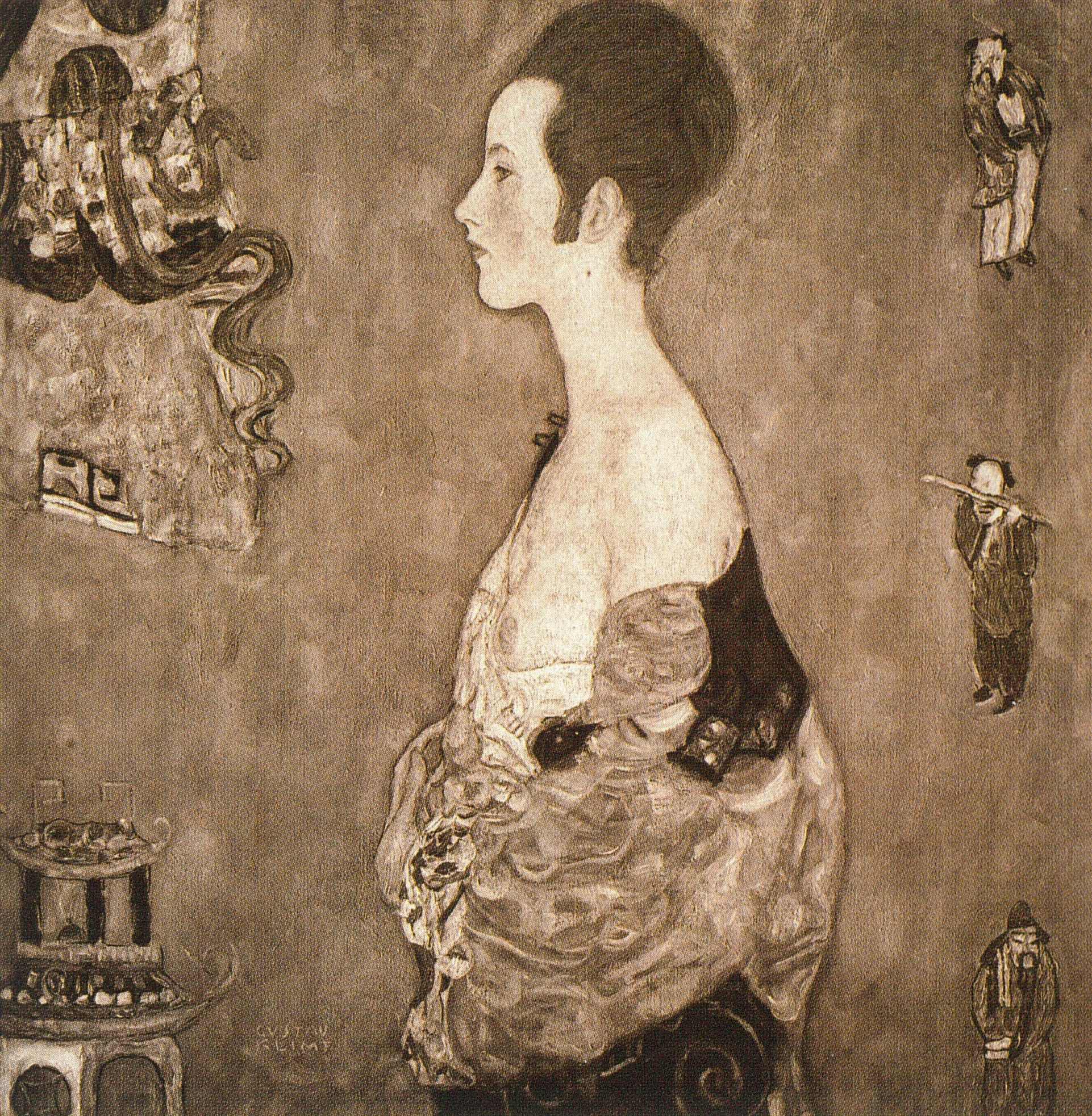
Klimt's portrait Wally (1916)

Lady with a Fan has similarities with Klimt's portrait Wally, painted in 1916, in which the model's left shoulder is uncovered. In Girlfriends or Two Women Friends (1916–1917), Klimt also painted a background with Oriental motifs, including a large phoenix. Both paintings were destroyed in 1945 during the fire at Immendorf Castle.

In contrast to Klimt's earlier works, Lady with a Fan is characterised by freer and more rapidly executed brushstrokes. While some art historians have suggested that the work was "unfinished", pointing out small patches of bare canvas such as where the model's upper arm meets her robe, art critic Kelly Grovier argues that "flux and fragmentation" are what gives the painting its power, concluding that "Its unfinishedness is what completes it."

== Provenance ==
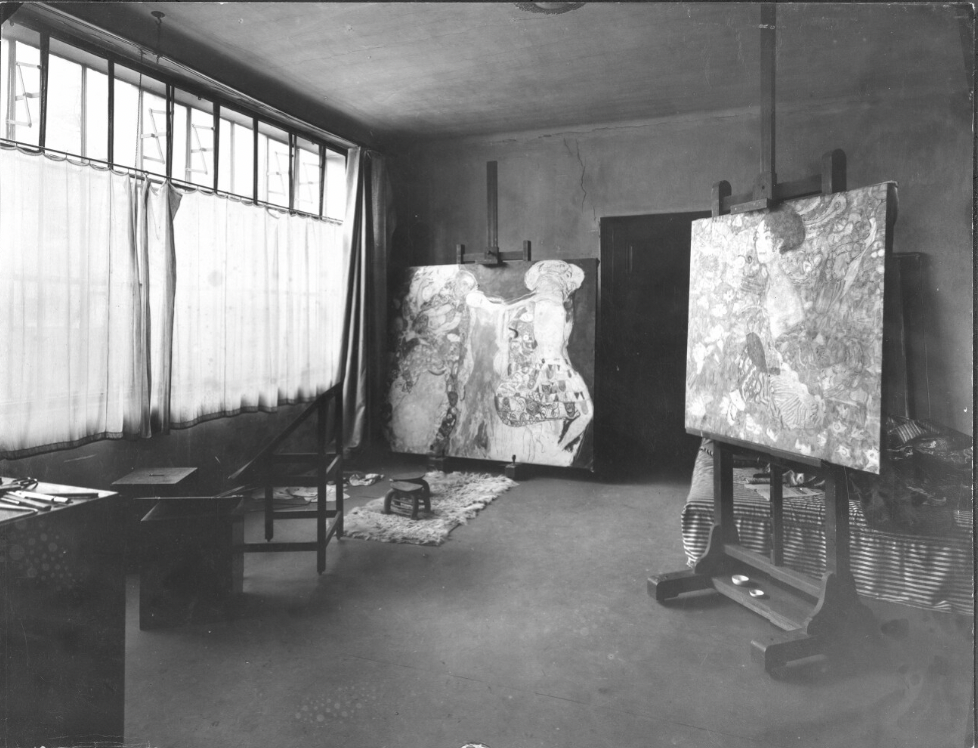
Dame mit Fächer (right) photographed by Moritz Nähr in Klimt's studio (1918)

Lady with a Fan was still on an easel in Klimt's studio, along with his unfinished work, The Bride, when he had a stroke and eventually died in early 1918.

Following his death in February 1918, the painting was held by the gallery of Gustav Nebehay of Vienna. By 1920, it had been bought by industrialist Erwin Böhler, who was a patron and friend of Klimt, along with his brother Heinrich who subsequently acquired it. In 1940, it was inherited by Heinrich's wife Mabel Böhler of Lugano, Switzerland.

Rudolf Leopold of Vienna owned the painting from around 1963 to 1981, followed by art collector and dealer Sege Sabarsky of New York. American art collector and entrepreneur Wendell Cherry acquired the piece from Sabarsky in 1988. On 11 May 1994, the work was sold by Sotheby's for $11.6 million (with fees) as part of an auction of Cherry's collection. Its sale, again by Sotheby's, on 27 June 2023 set an auction record for a work by Gustav Klimt, and was the highest price paid for an artwork in a public sale in Europe.

== Exhibits ==
The portrait has been exhibited publicly on only four occasions: in 1920 at the Vienna Kunstschau; in 1981 as part of a Gustav Klimt exhibition in museums and galleries in Tokyo, Osaka, Iwaki, and Yamanashi, Japan; in 1992 at the International Cultural Centre in Krakow, Poland; and from 2021 to 2022 at the Belvedere in Vienna.

== See also ==
- Japonisme
- List of paintings by Gustav Klimt
