= Nebehay =

Nebehay (Nebehaj, Nyebehaj, Nebehai) is a surname. Notable people with the surname include:

- Christian M. Nebehay (1909–2003), Austrian art dealer, collector and author
- Gustav Nebehay (1881–1935), Austrian art dealer and patron of the arts

== See also ==
- Lajos Nyírő (born Lajos Nebehaj) (1921–2014), Hungarian literary historian and aesthete
