= Patty Wong =

Patty Wong may refer to:

- Patty Wong (model)
- Patty Wong (librarian)

== See also ==
- Patti Wong, art adviser and auction house executive
