= Edwin Czeczowiczka =

Polish textile industrialist

- Born: 21 October 1877; Přerov, Moravia
- Died: 9 May 1971 (aged 93); London, United Kingdom
- Education: TU Wien
- Occupation: Industrialist
- Known for: Art collection of German Romantic drawings and old masters
- Spouse: Caroline "Cara" Reitlinger (m. 1919)

Edwin Czeczowiczka (21 October 1877 – 9 May 1971) was a textile industrialist. He was the founder of the firm Textilfabrik Brüder Czeczowiczka in Andrychów, Poland. Czeczowiczka became a successful businessman and art collector.

== Early life ==
Czeczowiczka was born on 21 October 1877 in Přerov, Moravia. He completing his studies at the TU Wien.

On 14 July 1919, Czeczowiczka married Caroline "Cara" Reitlinger (1896–1979) and the couple resided at Uraniastrasse 2 in Vienna.

== Career ==
Czeczowiczka expanded his textile firm in Vienna where it is listed in a 1929 registry.

== Art collection ==
In his early 20s, he began collecting German Romantic drawings with the help of Viennese art dealer Gustav Nebehay, later expanding his collection to include Old Master drawings. The collection included works by Gainsborough, Guardi, Schiele, Vogel, Amerling, Chodowiecki, Debucourt, Dusart, Cornelis, van Dyck, Füßli (der Jüngere), Guercino, Giovanni Francesco, Hodler, Ferdinand, Janinet, Jean Francois, Menzel, van der Neer (der Ältere), Tiepolo, Tintoretto and other artists.

== After the Anschluss ==
In 1938, as the Nazi regime imposed increasing restrictions, Edwin emigrated to Poland, where his textile firm was based. The Czeczowiczkas packed their extensive art collection for export. However, 22 works of art were seized on 29 October 1938, by the Vienna Gestapo and sent to the Central Office for Monument Protection. The contents of their lifts were later confiscated by the VUGESTA (Gestapo Office for the Disposal of the Property of Jewish Emigrants) and sold at the Dorotheum auction house in the early 1940s.

Edwin eventually made it to Poland, later rejoining his wife and children in England, where they had fled earlier. He died in London on 9 May 1971. Caroline died on 8 November 1979.

== Search for artworks seized by Nazis ==
The heirs have registered 42 search requests for artworks looted by the Nazis on the German Lost Art Foundation website.
