= Casazza (surname) =

Casazza is a surname. Notable people with the surname include:

- Elvira Casazza (1887–1965), Italian mezzo-soprano opera singer
- Fabrizio Casazza (born 1970), Italian footballer
- Giulio Gatti-Casazza (1869–1940), Italian opera manager
- Peter G. Casazza (born 1945), American mathematician
