= Hans Georg Feichtinger =

Austrian mathematician (born 1951)

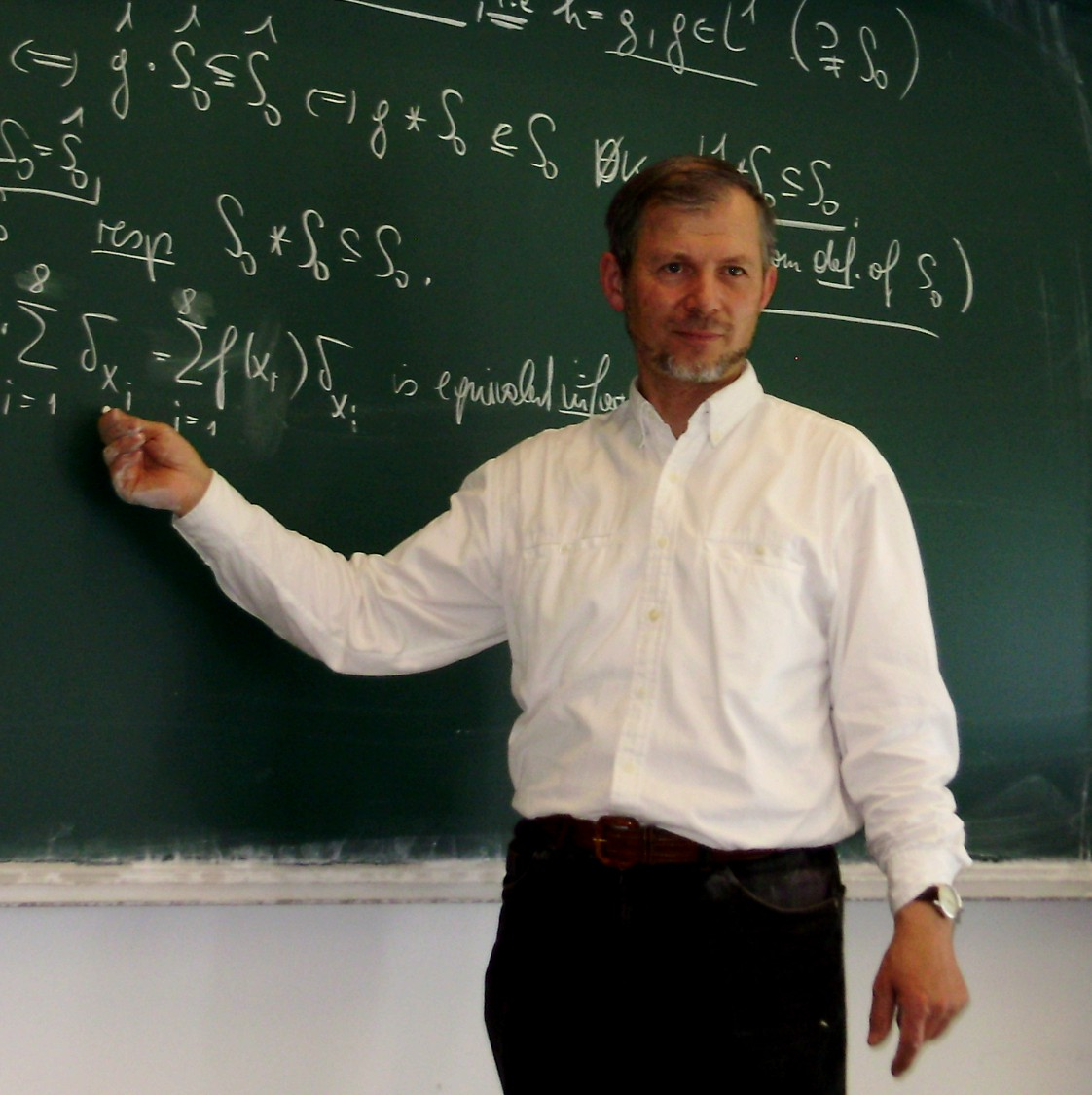
- Hans Georg Feichtinger teaching
- Born: 16 June 1951 (age 75); Wiener Neustadt, Austria
- Education: University of Vienna
- Known for: Gabor analysis Modulation spaces Feichtinger's algebra Feichtinger conjecture Coorbit theory Wiener amalgam spaces
- Scientific career
- Fields: Mathematician
- Workplaces: University of Vienna
- Doctoral advisor: Hans Reiter
- Doctoral students: Peter Balazs

Hans Georg Feichtinger (born 16 June 1951) is an Austrian mathematician. He is Professor in the mathematical faculty of the University of Vienna. He is editor-in-chief of the Journal of Fourier Analysis and Applications (JFAA) and associate editor to several other journals. He is one of the founders and head of the Numerical Harmonic Analysis Group (NuHAG) at University of Vienna. Today Feichtinger's main field of research is harmonic analysis with a focus on time-frequency analysis.

== Biography ==
Hans Georg Feichtinger was born in Wiener Neustadt where he graduated from the Gymnasium and received the Matura "summa cum laude" in 1969. In the same year he started his studies in mathematics and physics. He finished his PhD at the University of Vienna in 1974 under the supervision of Hans Reiter in 1974 with a doctoral thesis on Subalgebras of L^{1}(G). Feichtinger attained professorship with the defense of his habilitation thesis on Banach convolution algebras of functions in 1979. Feichtinger is author or co-author to roughly 200 scientific publications.

The University of Vienna being the center of his scientific life, Feichtinger still had several visiting positions across Europe and in the USA between 1980 and today, e.g. at the University of Maryland, College Park and the University of Connecticut, Storrs. He is married and the father of four children.

=== The NuHAG (Numerical Harmonic Analysis Group) ===
In the late 1980s Hans Georg Feichtinger and Karlheinz Gröchenig conducted joint research on atomic decompositions. From 1990 on, Feichtinger investigated irregular sampling and computational harmonic analysis with Thomas Strohmer. These cooperations were the basis for founding the Numerical Harmonic Analysis Group (NuHAG) at the University of Vienna with Feichtinger as group leader. While the research project Experimental Signal Analysis is noted as the starting point of NuHAG several earlier publications and projects are listed to be NuHAG related, the earliest dates back to 1986. Over the years, NuHAG has become a group of international importance in the fields from abstract harmonic analysis to applied time-frequency analysis and currently hosts around 40 researchers (including PhD students).

=== Dedication to the University of Vienna and the scientific community ===
Hans Georg Feichtinger is the editor-in-chief of the Journal of Fourier Analysis and Applications taking over from John J. Benedetto in the year 2000, and associate editor to the Journal of Approximation Theory (JAT), the Journal of Function spaces and Applications (JFSA) and Sampling Theory in Signal and Image Processing (STSIP). Furthermore, Feichtinger was for many years the contact person for the European Union's student exchange program LEONARDO at the faculty of mathematics of the University of Vienna and is actively involved in workshops and conferences. Throughout his career Hans G. Feichtinger has supervised 23 completed PhD theses, also today he is advising several students (as of June 2011).

== Scientific work ==
The scientific work of Hans Georg Feichtinger includes, but is not limited to results on function spaces, irregular sampling, time-frequency analysis, Gabor analysis and frame theory. Some of his most notable contributions are listed below.

In the early 1980s, Feichtinger introduced modulation spaces, a family of function spaces defined by the behavior of the short-time Fourier transform with respect to a test function from the Schwartz space. They have become the standard spaces in time-frequency analysis. Also, while the concept of function spaces treating local and global behavior separately was already known earlier, Wiener amalgam spaces were introduced by Feichtinger in 1980, also his publications have contributed to the acknowledgment of amalgam spaces as a useful tool in various mathematical fields.

Around 1990 the joint research with Karlheinz Gröchenig lead to a series of papers, which is today referred to as coorbit theory. The theory provides a unified framework for different important transforms, e.g. the wavelet transform and the short-time Fourier transform.

Feichtinger also proposed the use of Banach Gelfand triples, especially the Banach Gelfand triple $S_0 \subset L^2 \subset S_0'$ that has proven very useful, e.g. in time-frequency analysis.

=== Feichtinger's conjecture ===
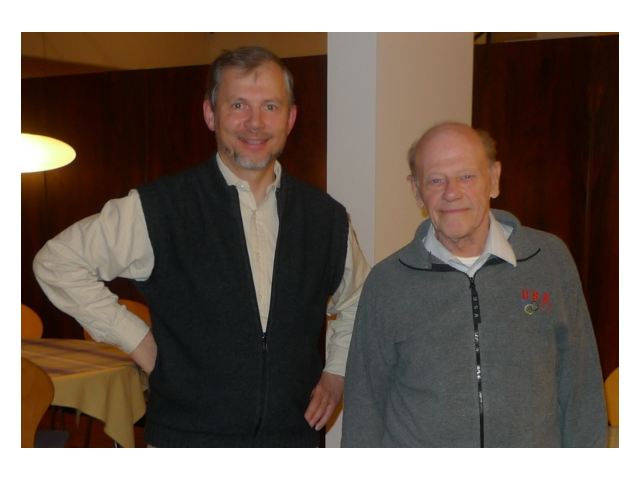
Feichtinger and Richard Kadison at a meeting in 2011

Feichtinger once raised the question, whether

Every bounded frame can be written as a finite union of Riesz basic sequences.

The question is now widely referred to as Feichtinger's conjecture, a term first used by Peter G. Casazza.

This question was not only an important open problem in frame theory but was found to be equivalent to the famous and long-open Kadison–Singer problem in analysis (first stated in 1959).

Proofs were known for certain special cases since 2005, and in 2013 an equivalent to the full conjecture was proved by Adam Marcus, Daniel A Spielman and Nikhil Srivastava.

== Selected publications ==
Hans Georg Feichtinger has published approximately 200 scientific articles, a selection of which is presented below (in chronological order):

- Feichtinger, Hans G. (1981). "On a new Segal algebra". Monatshefte für Mathematik. 92 (4). Springer Science and Business Media LLC: 269–289. doi:10.1007/bf01320058. ISSN 0026-9255. S2CID 121292861.
- Feichtinger, Hans G. (1981). "Banach Spaces of Distributions of Wiener's Type and Interpolation". Functional Analysis and Approximation. Basel: Birkhäuser Basel. pp. 153–165. doi:10.1007/978-3-0348-9369-5_16. ISBN 978-3-0348-9371-8.
- Feichtinger, Hans G.; Gröchenig, Karlheinz (1988). "A unified approach to atomic decompositions via integrable group representations". Function Spaces and Applications. Berlin, Heidelberg: Springer Berlin Heidelberg. doi:10.1007/bfb0078863. ISBN 978-3-540-18905-3. ISSN 0075-8434.
- Feichtinger, Hans G.; Gröchenig, Karlheinz (1992). "Gabor Wavelets and the Heisenberg Group: Gabor Expansions and Short Time Fourier Transform from the Group Theoretical Point of View". Wavelets. Elsevier. pp. 359–397. doi:10.1016/b978-0-12-174590-5.50018-6. ISBN 9780121745905.
- Feichtinger, Hans G.; Gröchenig, Karlheinz (7 July 2021). "Theory and practice of irregular sampling". Wavelets. Boca Raton: CRC Press. doi:10.1201/9781003210450-10. ISBN 978-1-003-21045-0. S2CID 14607775.
- Feichtinger, Hans G.; Gröchenig, Karlheinz; Strohmer, Thomas (1 February 1995). "Efficient numerical methods in non-uniform sampling theory". Numerische Mathematik. 69 (4). Springer Science and Business Media LLC: 423–440. doi:10.1007/s002110050101. ISSN 0029-599X. S2CID 15340037.
- Feichtinger, Hans G.; Gröchenig, K (1997). "Gabor Frames and Time-Frequency Analysis of Distributions". Journal of Functional Analysis. 146 (2). Elsevier BV: 464–495. doi:10.1006/jfan.1996.3078. ISSN 0022-1236.
  - Bolcskei, H.; Hlawatsch, F.; Feichtinger, H.G. (1998). "Frame-theoretic analysis of oversampled filter banks". IEEE Transactions on Signal Processing. 46 (12). Institute of Electrical and Electronics Engineers (IEEE): 3256–3268. doi:10.1109/78.735301. ISSN 1053-587X.
- Feichtinger, Hans G.; Strohmer, Thomas (1998). Gabor Analysis and Algorithms : Theory and Applications. Boston, MA: Birkhäuser Boston. ISBN 978-1-4612-2016-9. OCLC 840278297.
- Feichtinger, Hans G.; Strohmer, Thomas (2003). Advances in Gabor Analysis. Boston, MA: Birkhäuser Boston. ISBN 978-1-4612-0133-5. OCLC 840277709.
- Feichtinger, Hans G.; Kaiblinger, Norbert (12 November 2003). "Varying the time-frequency lattice of Gabor frames". Transactions of the American Mathematical Society. 356 (5). American Mathematical Society (AMS): 2001–2023. doi:10.1090/s0002-9947-03-03377-4. ISSN 0002-9947.
