= Johanna Staude =

Unfinished portrait by Gustav Klimt (1917–1918)

Portrait of Johanna Staude
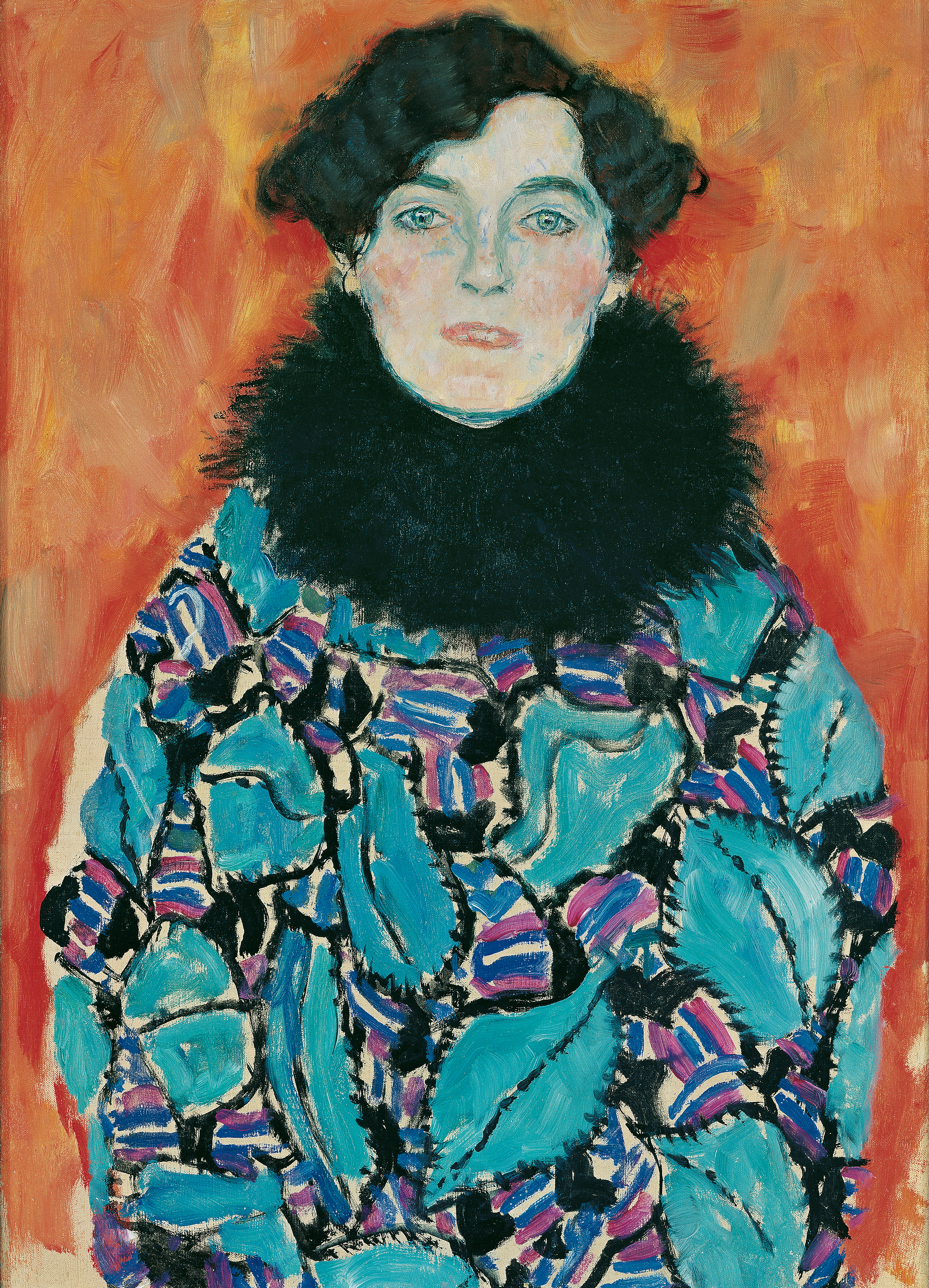
- Artist: Gustav Klimt
- Year: 1917–1918
- Dimensions: 50 cm × 70 cm (20 in × 28 in)
- Location: Österreichische Galerie Belvedere, Vienna

Portrait of Johanna Staude (Note: Also referred to simply as Johanna Staude.) (1917–1918) is an unfinished painting by Gustav Klimt, depicting Johanna Staude (née Widlicka; 16 February 1883 – 2 July 1967), an Austrian divorcée who also modeled for Egon Schiele. She described her occupation as language teacher, and later, as a painter, although no works of her own are known. The Financial Times has described the Klimt painting as the culmination of his development as a portraitist, portraying "a new, post-war woman, self-aware, intelligent, modern, staring boldly out at us, sporting a fashionable short hair-cut and black feather boa". The painting was acquired by the Österreichische Galerie Belvedere in 1963.

== Portrait ==
Klimt was commissioned to paint the portrait of Johanna Staude in 1917. The portrait prominently features a blouse made of the Blätter (Leaves) fabric designed by textile artist Martha Alber of the Wiener Werkstätte. (Note: Some sources describe the outfit as a "dress".) Unlike earlier Klimt portraits, Staude is not integrated into the background, conveying a sense of autonomy which many observers have interpreted as signifying a confident "modern woman" who is "daringly dressed". The stark colour contrast between the turquoise fabric pattern and the mandarin orange background recalls French Fauvism as well as German Expressionism.

Despite the bold patterns on her clothing, Klimt draws attention to the expression on Staude's face, by framing it with a black feather collar. Author Nathaniel Harris writes that "unlike most of the women in Klimt's late paintings, she is grave, perhaps even sad." John Collins also notes "the uncertain look in her grey-green eyes, slightly tilted head and parted lips" which have a "note of melancholy, perhaps even a resignation to the bleak prospects of wartime Vienna." A more critical interpretation of Johanna Staude by curator Kirk Varnedoe in 1986 described her as "uncharacteristically disheveled" and "numbly distraught".

== Biography ==
Born in Vienna in 1883, Johanna Widlicka was the sister of the academic painters Leopold and Anton Widlicka, and opera singer Richard Widlicka. In 1914, she married Franz Staude, whom she divorced in 1918.

During her lifetime, Staude identified as a language teacher and painter, and worked as a housekeeper for Austrian poet Peter Altenberg (1859–1919). Klimt may have introduced her to Altenberg, who was part of his inner circle of friends and admirers. After Klimt died in February 1918, Altenberg inscribed a eulogy on a drawing that Klimt had made of Staude, and later wrote that she was a "modern saint" for helping to care for him during his last year of life.

In the early 1960s, Staude said in an interview that she had modeled for both Klimt and Egon Schiele, but it is unknown which specific paintings she posed for in addition to her portrait. Staude is often compared to the unidentified woman in Klimt's Lady with a Fan (Dame mit Fächer). She may have also posed nude for a study for The Girlfriends. Sometime after 1963, Staude checked in to a hospital in Vienna where she later died.

According to Klimt biographer Christian M. Nebehay, Erich Lederer recounted that Staude had asked Klimt why he had not finished her portrait, particularly around the mouth. His reply was, "Because then you will never come to the studio again."

== See also ==
- List of paintings by Gustav Klimt
