= George Piranian =

Swiss-American mathematician (1914–2009)

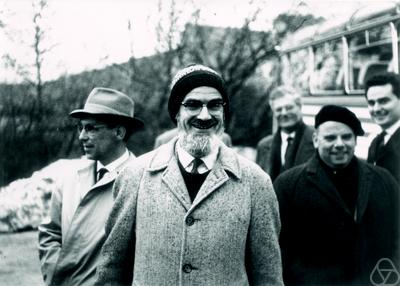
- George Piranian (pictured in center) at Oberwolfach in 1961
- Born: May 2, 1914; Thalwil, Switzerland
- Died: August 31, 2009 (aged 95); Ann Arbor, Michigan, U.S.
- Education: Utah State University (BS, MS); Hertford College, Oxford; Rice University (PhD)
- Scientific career
- Fields: Complex analysis
- Workplaces: University of Michigan
- Thesis: A Study of the Position and Nature of the Singularities of Functions Given by Their Taylor Series (1943)
- Doctoral advisor: Szolem Mandelbrojt
- Doctoral students: Theodore Kaczynski

George Piranian (Armenian: Գևորգ Փիրանեան; May 2, 1914 – August 31, 2009) was a Swiss-American mathematician. Piranian was internationally known for his research in complex analysis, his association with Paul Erdős, and his editing of the Michigan Mathematical Journal.

== Early life and education ==
Piranian was born in Thalwil outside Zürich, Switzerland. His father, Patvakan Piranian, was originally from Armenia. George and his brother David at home were called Gevorg and Davit, the Armenian versions of their names. His family immigrated to Logan, Utah, in 1929. Piranian received a B.S. in agriculture and M.S. in botany (1937) at Utah State University. As a Rhodes scholar, Piranian first "tasted blood" in mathematics at Hertford College, Oxford.

After returning to the United States, Piranian earned his Ph.D. in mathematics under Szolem Mandelbrojt at Rice University (1943). Piranian's dissertation was entitled A Study of the Position and Nature of the Singularities of Functions Given by Their Taylor Series.

Piranian joined the faculty at University of Michigan in 1945.

== Michigan Mathematical Journal ==
In 1952, Piranian, along with Paul Erdős, Fritz Herzog and Arthur J. Lohwater, founded the Michigan Mathematical Journal; leadership in editing was assumed by Piranian in 1954. Piranian co-authored a research paper with Erdős and Herzog; as a consequence he has an Erdős number of one.

Piranian's editing was renowned in mathematics.

== Teaching ==
Piranian's teaching captivated several future research mathematicians. Piranian also was an advisor with the Honors Program at the College of Literature, Science and the Arts at the University of Michigan.

In the 1960s, Piranian taught and advised Theodore Kaczynski, who was a Ph.D. student in mathematics. In 1996, Kaczynski was arrested for the Unabomber crimes and later pled guilty.
