= Hans J. Reiter =

Austrian mathematician

Hans Jakob Reiter
- Born: 26 November 1921; Vienna, Austria
- Died: 13 August 1992 (aged 70); Vienna, Austria
- Known for: Reiter's condition
- Spouse(s): Ingeborg Braun, née Widhofner
- Children: Heinrich
- Scientific career
- Thesis: Investigations in Harmonic Analysis
- Doctoral advisor: Szolem Mandelbrojt
- Doctoral students: Reinhard Bürger, Hans Georg Feichtinger, Ernst Kotzmann, Werner Nowak, Jan Stegeman

Hans Jakob Reiter (26 November 1921 – 13 August 1992) was an Austrian mathematician working in analysis.

Because of the Anschluss, Hans Reiter had to leave his hometown before his Matura. Via Italy he was able to emigrate to Brazil, where he studied under André Weil. In 1953 he received his PhD from Rice University under Szolem Mandelbrojt with thesis Investigations in harmonic analysis. In 1952 he became an assistant at the University of Vienna and in 1971 obtained a professorial chair there, after years in various foreign academic positions, including an interval from 1964 to 1971 as a professor at the University of Utrecht. Reiter's doctoral students include Hans Georg Feichtinger.

Reiter wrote the widely used textbook Classical Harmonic Analysis and Locally Compact Groups.
