= Comagena =

Fortified Roman camp on the Danube, Austria

Coordinates: 48.3328°N 16.0569°E

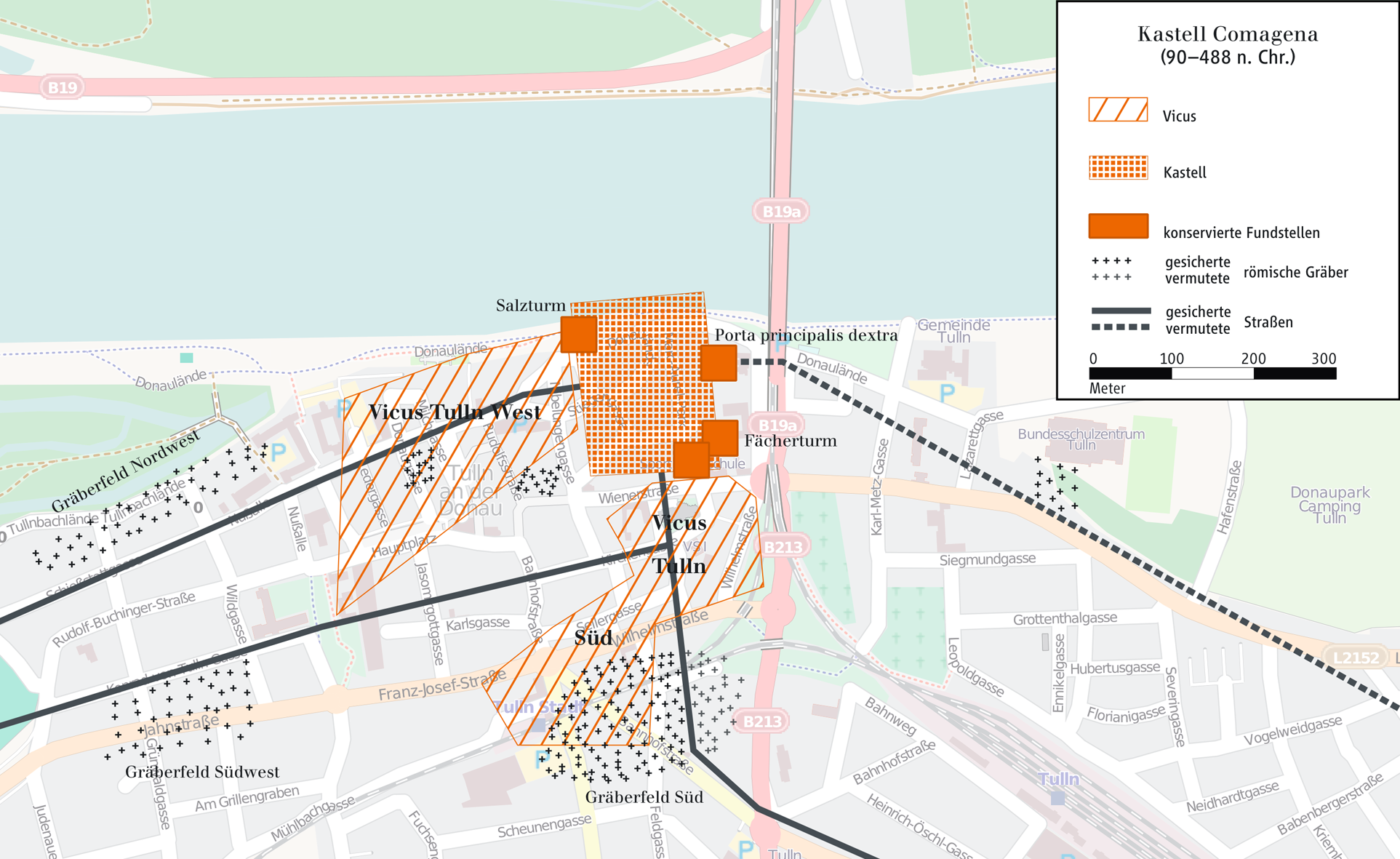
Plan of Comagena and the associated vici, overlaid on a modern map of the site

Comagena was a fortified Roman camp on the Danube, on the site of the modern town of Tulln on the Danube in Lower Austria, Austria. Built as a defensive work along the Norican frontier, it originally housed an ala of up to 500 cavalry troops (ala I Commagenorum). From its exposed situation, it was able to guard a militarily significant ford over the Danube and control the valley lowlands for a good distance upstream and down.

Several phases of rebuilding at the site have been identified: it was established, as an earth-and-timber encampment, in the late 1st century AD, probably under Domitian, and in the early 2nd century stone fortifications were constructed. In its later days the fort served as the base of a naval fleet (the classis Comaginensis), as well as a cavalry regiment (equites promoti). Excavations to the west and south of the fort have uncovered evidence of at least two associated vici (civilian settlements) and three graveyards.
