= Aubad =

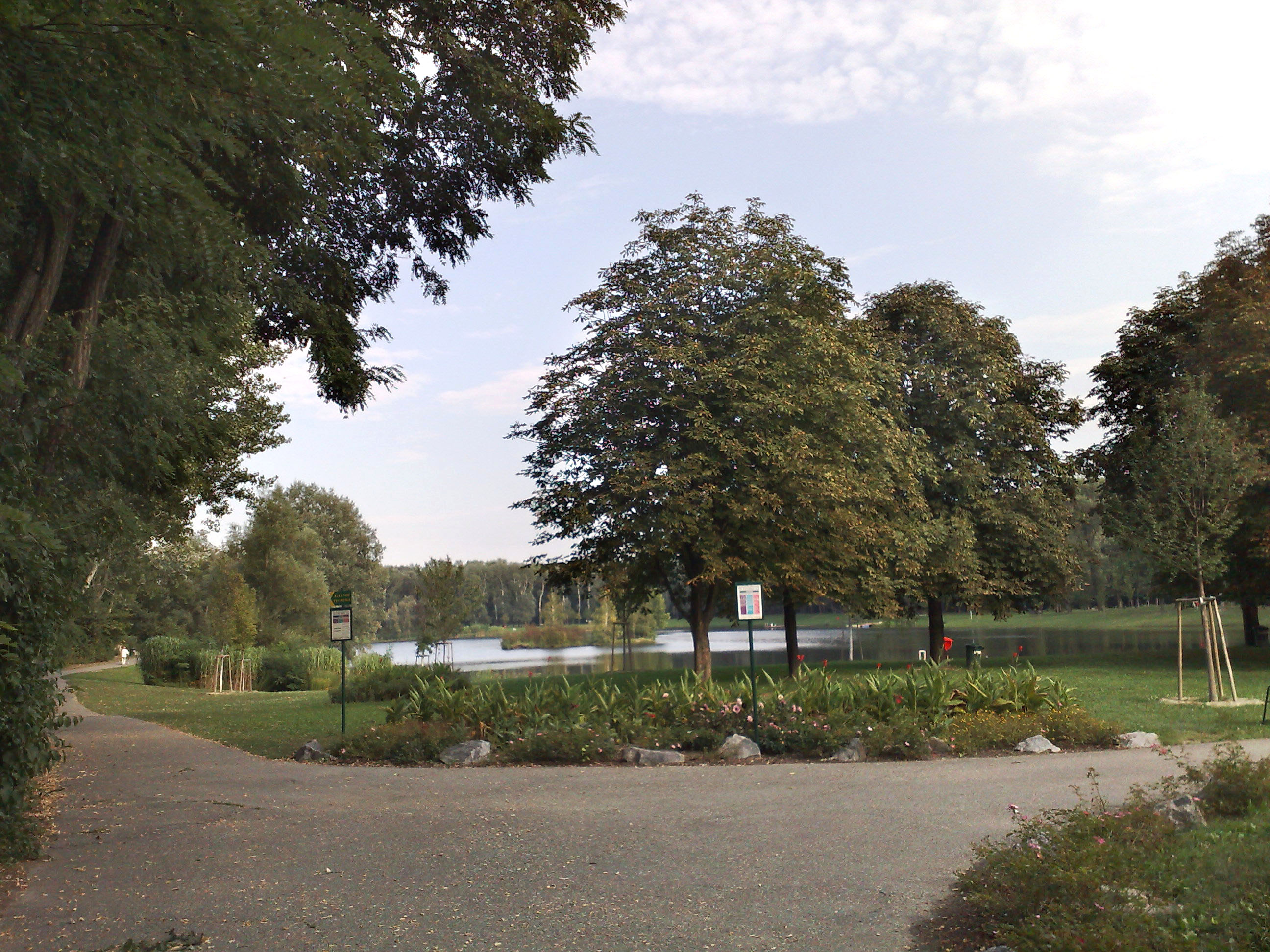
- Aubad in Tulln

- Location within Austria
- Location: Tulln an der Donau, Lower Austria
- Coordinates: 48.333°N 16.077°E
- Lake type: artificial lake
- Basin countries: Austria
- Surface area: 0.05 km^{2} (0.019 sq mi)

The Aubad is a 50,000-square-metre (12-acre) man-made lake in Tulln on the Danube, Austria. It is the centerpiece of a recreational park (Erholungspark) that includes facilities for swimming, as well as a 10-hectare (25-acre) area for sport and leisure activities—such as soccer, volleyball, baseball and basketball—and 15 hectares (37 acres) of woodland. The lake and park are popular summertime resorts for both townspeople and tourists.
