= Leo Stopfer =

Austrian artist

- Born: Leo Stopfer; 15 May 1964 (age 61); Tulln an der Donau, Austria
- Known for: Painting, drawing
- Movement: Contemporary art
- Website: http://leostopfer.com

The artist is best known for his acrylic work in 2011, named "Bella Figura." The painting represents the ballerina duo Ketevan Papava and Marie-Claire d´Lyse with prints of their hands and feet on canvas.

Leo Stopfer (born 15 May, 1964) is an Austrian artist who is widely acclaimed as the "Painter of the Ballet-Stars." He is especially identified with the subject of ballet, and more than half of his works depict famous dancers of world fame.

== Biography ==
=== Early life and art techniques ===
- 1979 – first drawings;
- 1981 – inspired by Picasso's works, he starts painting with oil-color;
- 1982 – first personal exhibition;
- 1989/90 — "The earth has a skin" (German: Die Erde hat eine Haut) – organic abstract paintings in his special mixed technique (with soil, stones, sand, and dry plants mixed with acrylic- or oil-colors creating a relief on canvas) is the main part of his work until 2009.

=== Ballerina Paintings ===
In 1989, Leo Stopfer created his first pastel paintings and drawings of the ballerina Mitra Nayeri.

Later, Stopfer made ballet one of the main themes of his art. Cooperating with many dancers for many years; he created many paintings depicting the ballerinas of the 20th and 21st centuries. Among them are such grandees of the world ballet scene such as Diana Vishneva (the Mariinsky Theatre), Olga Smirnova and Evgenia Obraztsova (Bolshoi Theatre), Vladimir Malakhov (Berlin State Ballet), Maria Abashova (Ballet Theatre of Boris Eifman), Maria Yakovleva (Vienna State Ballet) and Isabelle Ciaravola and Ludmila Pagliero (Opera de Paris).

=== Exhibitions ===
Since his first exhibition in 1982, Stopfer's work has been exhibited all around Europe, including London, Vienna, Berlin, Moscow, and Luxembourg.

Leo Stopfer was the first artist to be invited by the Klimt Villa in Vienna in 2017 to work in the original studio where the master Gustav Klimt lived and worked. This work resulted in dozens of drawings and a large number of women's portraits united under the title "my muses" (German: meine Musen). This series of works was presented at the personal exhibition of Leo Stopfer in the Klimt Villa in May 2018.

Stopfer had a current solo exhibition that took place at the Vienna State Opera. At the invitation of the directorate of the Vienna State Opera, Leo Stopfer presented an exhibition of his works capturing dancers of the house to the public.

== Style ==
Stopfer's earlier paintings are landscapes in an organic-abstract style, using a mixed impasto technique. He combined earth, sand, and stones with acrylic paint to develop a relief-like texture.

The artist likes to work with acrylic combined with pencil. He also sometimes works with mixed media, using gouache when the ballerinas dance on his canvas to make prints with their feet.

In his works, the artist tries to express a portion of the dancer's energy. The models depicted by Leo Stopfer are always characterized by heightened sensuality and frankness.

== Bibliography ==
- Tichy-Luger, Ingeborg (2014). "Leo Stopfer. The man who paints ballet stars". Dancer's. No. 1.
- Deegmal, Elena (2016). "Лео Стопфер и его звёздные балерины" [Leo Stopfer and his star ballerinas]. Rutage (in Russian). Vol. 3, no. 8.
