= Coorbit theory =

In mathematics, coorbit theory was developed by Hans Georg Feichtinger and Karlheinz Gröchenig around 1990. It provides theory for atomic decomposition of a range of Banach spaces of distributions. Among others the well established wavelet transform and the short-time Fourier transform are covered by the theory.

The starting point is a square integrable representation $\pi$ of a locally compact group $\mathcal G$ on a Hilbert space $\mathcal H$, with which one can define a transform of a function $f \in \mathcal H$ with respect to $g\in \mathcal H$ by $V_g f (x) = \langle f, \pi(x)g \rangle$. Many important transforms are special cases of the transform, e.g. the short-time Fourier transform and the wavelet transform for the Heisenberg group and the affine group respectively. Representation theory yields the reproducing formula $V_g f = V_g f * V_g g$. By discretization of this continuous convolution integral it can be shown that by sufficiently dense sampling in phase space the corresponding functions will span a frame for the Hilbert space.

An important aspect of the theory is the derivation of atomic decompositions for Banach spaces. One of the key steps is to define the voice transform for distributions in a natural way. For a given Banach space $Y$, the corresponding coorbit space is defined as the set of all distributions such that $V_g f \in Y$. The reproducing formula is true also in this case and therefore it is possible to obtain atomic decompositions for coorbit spaces.
