= Interdisciplinary Transformation University Austria =

Technical university with digitalisation focus

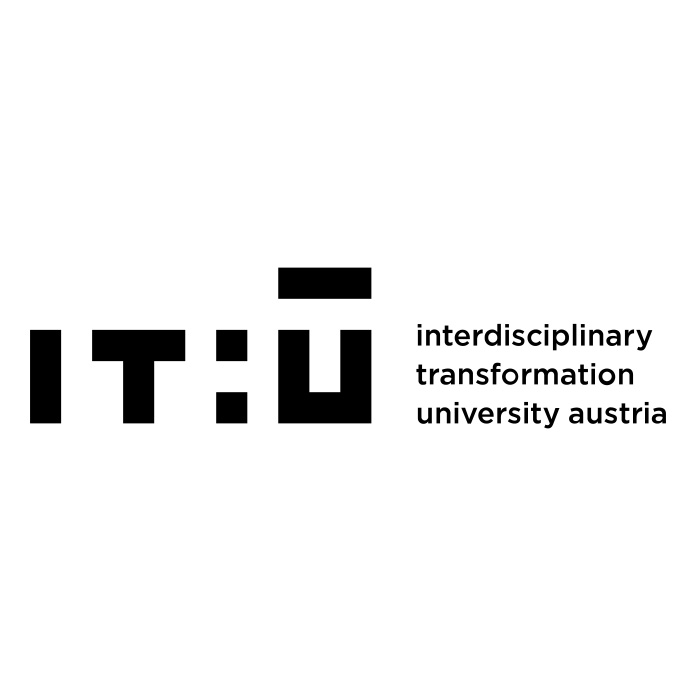
Interdisciplinary Transformation University Austria (IT:U)

The Interdisciplinary Transformation University Austria (abbreviated as IT:U) is a technical university specialising in digitalisation and digital transformation, based in Linz (Austria). It is one of the first public universities in Europe to focus on the digital transformation of industry, science, business and society.

== History ==
In summer 2020, the Austrian federal government announced the establishment of a new technical university.

In 2022, an independent planning group presented the first academic concept for the new technical university, with a focus on digitalization. In July 2022, the Federal Act on the Establishment of the Institute of Digital Sciences Austria (IDSA) came into force as the first legal basis for the new Digital University of Technology. In October 2022, the Federal Ministry of Education, Science, and Research established the Founding Convention.

In March 2023, Stefanie Lindstaedt was elected Founding President by the Founding Convention. In July 2023, Stefanie Lindstaedt officially took office as the university's new founding president. In November 2023, the university's new name IT:U (Interdisciplinary Transformation University) was unveiled. The IT:U implemented the Founding Lab project in collaboration with the Ars Electronica Center.

In July 2024, the new federal law on the Institute of Digital Sciences Austria (Interdisciplinary Transformation University) came into effect, replacing the previous founding law as the legal basis. At the start of the fall/winter semester 2024/25, eleven newly appointed founding professors began conducting research at IT:U. In addition, the second doctoral program in Computational X was launched alongside the first doctoral program in Digital Transformation in Learning, which was designed in cooperation between IT:U and JKU. At the end of 2024, IT:U became a member of the Complexity Science Hub.

In fall 2025, the first master's program in Interdisciplinary Computing launched at IT:U. The first bachelor's programs are scheduled to begin in the 2029/2030 academic year. By the 2036/2037 academic year, the university aims to have 5,000 students, and by 2036/2037, approximately 150 professors and equivalent faculty members.

== Degree programs ==
IT:U offers interdisciplinary master's and doctoral programs with a focus on technology and society. The academic curriculum follows a project-based learning approach, making them practically applicable.

The master's program Science in Interdisciplinary Computing is geared toward shaping the digital transformation and focuses on topics such as artificial intelligence, cybersecurity, sustainable transformation, and the digital economy. The doctoral program comprises two PhD programs (Computational X, Digital Transformation in Learning) and is designed to support interdisciplinary research.

== Research and development ==
The interdisciplinary research priorities at IT:U include, amongst others, the areas artificial intelligence, human-computer Interaction (HCI), systems and infrastructure, scientific and medical applications, and economics and sustainability.

The research is guided by international standards such as the DORA principles and the Coalition for Open Research Assessment Reform (COARA). Notable researchers include, among others, Peter Balazs.

== Collaborations ==
Since 2025, IT:U has been a member of Eurasia-Pacific Uninet (EPU), which connects Austrian universities with partner institutions in Asia. In addition, IT:U is associated to Uninovis, a European university alliance focused on data science, interdisciplinary learning, and digital transformation. As part of the PhD program Digital Transformation in Learning, IT:U collaborates with Johannes Kepler University Linz (JKU).

== Location ==
IT:U is physically located in Linz. In its early stages, IT:U leased vacant space from Johannes Kepler University. In October 2025, the campus was expanded to a total of 9,000 square metres.

== Awards ==
- 2025: Minerva Award for the Accessible University accessibility concept
- 2024: Nomination of the winning project, Electopolis: The Politics of Decision, for the DigiEduHack Hackathon Global Awards
