= Wiener amalgam space =

In mathematics, amalgam spaces categorize functions with regard to their local and global behavior. While the concept of function spaces treating local and global behavior separately was already known earlier, Wiener amalgams, as the term is used today, were introduced by Hans Georg Feichtinger in 1980. The concept is named after Norbert Wiener.

Let $X$ be a normed space with norm $\|\cdot \|_X$. Then the Wiener amalgam space with local component $X$ and global component $L^p_m$, a weighted $L^p$ space with non-negative weight $m$, is defined by

$$W(X,L^p) = \left\{ f\ :\ \left(\int_{\mathbb{R}^d} \|f(\cdot)\bar{g}(\cdot-x)\|^p_X m(x)^p \, dx\right)^{1/p} < \infty\right\},$$

where $g$ is a continuously differentiable, compactly supported function, such that $\sum_{x\in\mathbb{Z^d}} g(z-x) = 1$, for all $z\in\mathbb{R}^d$. Again, the space defined is independent of $g$. As the definition suggests, Wiener amalgams are useful to describe functions showing characteristic local and global behavior.
