= Szolem Mandelbrojt =

Polish-French mathematician (1899–1983)

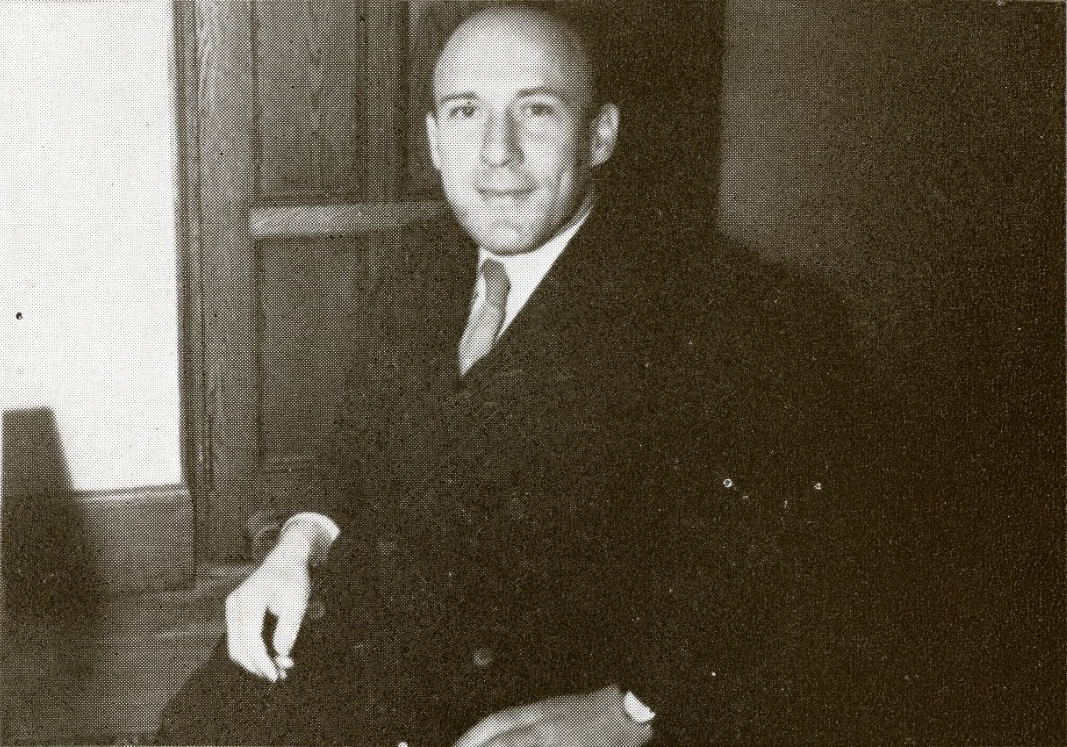
- Born: 10 January 1899; Warsaw, Congress Poland, Russian Empire
- Died: 23 September 1983 (aged 84); Paris, France
- Education: University of Paris; University of Kharkiv
- Scientific career
- Fields: Mathematics
- Workplaces: Collège de France; Rice University; University of Clermont-Ferrand; University of Lille
- Doctoral advisor: Jacques Hadamard
- Doctoral students: Paul Malliavin; Shmuel Agmon; John Gergen; Jean-Pierre Kahane; Yitzhak Katznelson; George Piranian; Hans Jakob Reiter

Notes
- He was the uncle of Benoit Mandelbrot.

Szolem Mandelbrojt (10 January 1899 – 23 September 1983) was a Polish-French mathematician who specialized in mathematical analysis. He was a professor at the Collège de France from 1938 to 1972, where he held the Chair of Analytical Mechanics and Celestial Mechanics.

== Biography ==
Szolem Mandelbrojt was born on 10 January 1899 in Warsaw, Poland into a Jewish family of Lithuanian descent. He was initially educated in Warsaw, then in 1919 he moved to Kharkiv, Ukraine (then USSR) and spent a year as a student of the Russian mathematician Sergei Bernstein. A year later, he emigrated to France and settled in Paris. In subsequent years, he attended the seminars of Jacques Hadamard, Henri Lebesgue, Émile Picard, and others. In 1923, he received a doctorate from the University of Paris on the analytic continuation of the Taylor series. Hadamard was his Ph.D. advisor.

In 1924 Mandelbrojt was awarded a Rockefeller Fellowship in the United States. In May 1926 he married Gladys Manuelle Grunwald (born 28 June 1904 in Paris). From 1926 to 1927, he spent a year as an assistant professor at the Rice Institute (now Rice University) in Houston, Texas.

In 1928 he returned to France - having received French citizenship in 1927 – and was appointed an assistant professor at the University of Lille. The following year he became a full professor at the University of Clermont-Ferrand. In December 1934 Mandelbrojt co-founded the Nicolas Bourbaki group of mathematicians, of which he was a member until World War II. He succeeded Hadamard at Collège de France in 1938 and took up the Chair of Analytical Mechanics and Celestial Mechanics.

Mandelbrojt helped several members of his family emigrate from Poland to France in 1936. One of them, his nephew Benoit Mandelbrot, was to discover the Mandelbrot set and coin the word fractal in the 1970s.

In 1939 he fought for France when the country was invaded by the Nazis, then in 1940, along with many scientists helped by Louis Rapkine and the Rockefeller Foundation, Mandelbrojt relocated to the United States, taking up a position at the Rice Institute. In 1944 he joined the scientific committee of the Free French Forces in London, England.

In 1945 Mandelbrojt moved back to France and resumed his professional activities at Collège de France, where he remained until his retirement in 1972. In his retirement year he was elected a member of the French Academy of Sciences.

Szolem Mandelbrojt died at the age of 84 in Paris, France, on 23 September 1983.

== Research ==
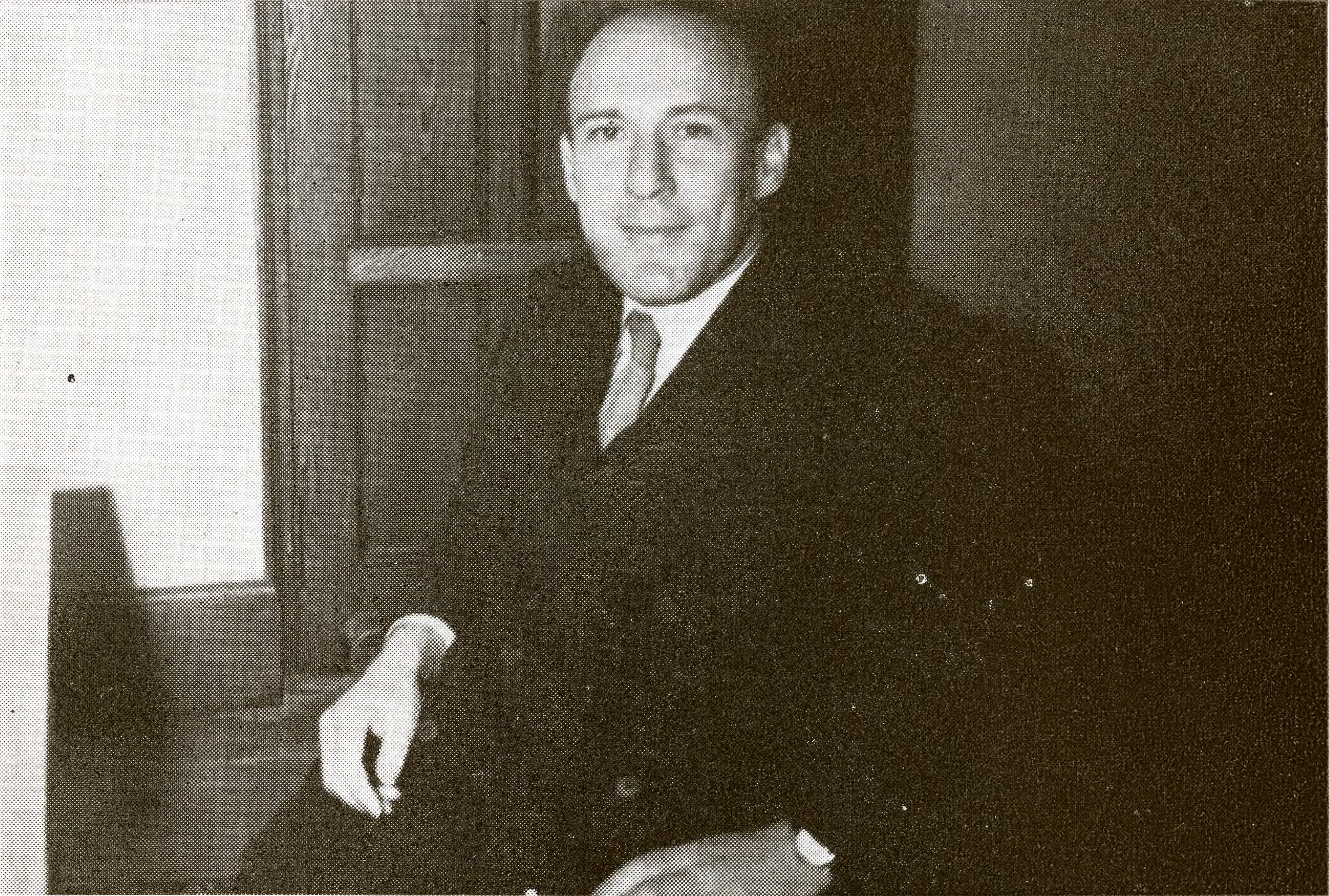
Szolem Mandelbrojt, 1941

Even though Mandelbrojt was an early member of the Bourbaki group, and he did take part in a number of Bourbaki gatherings until the breakout of the war, his main research interests were actually quite remote from abstract algebra. As evidenced by his publications (see next), he focused on complex analysis and harmonic analysis, with an emphasis on Dirichlet series, lacunary series, and entire functions.

Rather than a Bourbakist, he is perhaps more accurately described as a follower of G. H. Hardy. Together with Norbert Wiener and Torsten Carleman, he can be viewed as a moderate modernizer of classical Fourier analysis.

Shmuel Agmon, Jean-Pierre Kahane, Yitzhak Katznelson, Paul Malliavin and George Piranian are among his students.

== Selected works ==
=== Books ===
- Hadamard, Jacques; Mandelbrojt, Szolem (1926). La série de Taylor et son prolongement analytique (2nd ed.). Gauthier-Villars.
- Mandelbrojt, Szolem (1951). "General theorems of closure". Rice Institute Pamphlet (Monograph published as a special issue). XIV (4): 225–352.
- Mandelbrojt, Szolem (1958). "Composition Theorems". Rice Institute Pamphlet (Monograph published as a special issue). 45 (3).
- Mandelbrojt, Szolem (1967). Fonctions entières et transformées de Fourier. Applications. Mathematical Society of Japan.
- Mandelbrojt, Szolem (1972) [1969]. Dirichlet series. Principles and methods [Séries de Dirichlet. Principes et méthodes]. Reidel.

=== Lecture notes ===
- Mandelbrojt, Szolem (1927). "Modern researches on the singularities of functions defined by Taylor's series; lectures delivered at the Rice Institute during the academic year 1926-27". Rice Institute Pamphlet (12 articles). 14 (4).
- Mandelbrojt, Szolem (1935). Séries de Fourier et classes quasi-analytiques de fonctions. Leçons professées à l'Institut Henri Poincaré et à la Faculté des sciences de Clermont-Ferrand. Gauthier-Villars.
- Mandelbrojt, Szolem (1942). "Analytic Functions and Classes of Infinitely Differentiable Functions. A series of lectures delivered at the Rice Institute during the academic year 1940-41". Rice Institute Pamphlet (17 articles). 29 (1).
- Mandelbrojt, Szolem (1944). "Dirichlet series. Lectures delivered at the Rice Institute during the academic year 1942-43". Rice Institute Pamphlet (10 articles). 31 (4).
- Mandelbrojt, Szolem (1952). Séries adhérentes. Régularisation des suites. Applications. Leçons professées au Collège de France et au Rice Institute. Gauthier-Villars.

=== Articles ===
- Mandelbrojt, M. S. (1932). Les singularités des fonctions analytiques représentées par une série de Taylor (PDF). Mémorial des Sciences Mathématiques. Vol. 54. Gauthier-Villars.
- Mandelbrojt, Szolem (1936). "Séries lacunaires". Actualités Scientifiques et Industrielles. 305 (Exposés sur la théorie des fonctions, no. 2). Hermann.
- Mandelbrojt, Szolem (1938). "La régularisation des fonctions". Actualités Scientifiques et Industrielles. 733 (Exposés sur la théorie des fonctions, no. 13). Hermann.
- Mandelbrojt, Szolem; Ulrich, Floyd Edward (1942). "On a generalization of the problem of quasi-analyticity". Trans. Amer. Math. Soc. 52 (2): 265–282. doi:10.1090/S0002-9947-1942-0007015-4. MR 0007015.
- Mandelbrojt, Szolem (1944). "Quasi-analyticity and analytic continuation—a general principle". Trans. Amer. Math. Soc. 55: 96–131. doi:10.1090/S0002-9947-1944-0009635-1. MR 0009635.
- Mandelbrojt, Szolem; MacLane, Gerald R. (1947). "On functions holomorphic in a strip region, and an extension of Watson's problem". Trans. Amer. Math. Soc. 61 (3): 454–467. doi:10.1090/S0002-9947-1947-0020142-5. MR 0020142.
- Mandelbrojt, Szolem (1948). "Analytic continuation and infinitely differentiable functions". Bull. Amer. Math. Soc. 54 (3): 239–248. doi:10.1090/S0002-9904-1948-08963-7. MR 0023877.
- Chandrasekharan, K.; Mandelbrojt, Szolem (1959). "On solutions of Riemann's functional equation". Bull. Amer. Math. Soc. 65 (6): 358–362. doi:10.1090/S0002-9904-1959-10372-4. MR 0111727.
- Mandelbrojt, Szolem (1966). "Les taubériens généraux de Norbert Wiener". Bull. Amer. Math. Soc. 72 (1): 48–51. doi:10.1090/S0002-9904-1966-11461-1. MR 0184008.
- Mandelbrojt, Szolem (1967). "Exponentielle associée à un ensemble; transformées de Fourier généralisées". Annales de l'Institut Fourier. 17 (1): 325–351. doi:10.5802/aif.259. MR 0257360.

=== Thesis ===
- Mandelbrojt, Szolem (1923). Sur les séries de Taylor qui présentent des lacunes (Ph.D. thesis). Paris-Sorbonne University.
