= Peter Balazs (mathematician) =

Austrian mathematician (born 1970)

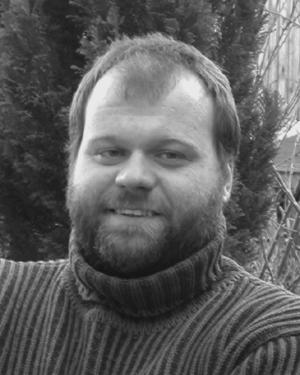
- Born: 11 December 1970 (age 55); Tulln an der Donau, Austria
- Education: University of Vienna
- Awards: Start-Preis
- Scientific career
- Fields: Mathematics, Signal processing, Acoustics
- Workplaces: Acoustics Research Institute, CNRS, Université catholique de Louvain
- Doctoral advisor: Hans Georg Feichtinger

Peter Balazs (born 11 December 1970 in Tulln an der Donau) is an Austrian mathematician working at the Acoustics Research Institute Vienna of the Austrian Academy of Sciences.

Peter Balazs studied mathematics and physics at the University of Vienna. In 2001, he graduated with honors in mathematics and an MSc thesis on "Polynomials over Groups" ("Polynome über Gruppen"). He successfully defended his PhD thesis and graduated (with distinction) in June 2005. His PhD thesis is titled, "Regular and Irregular Gabor Multiplier with Application to Psychoacoustic Masking".

Peter Balazs has been part of the Acoustics Research Institute since 1999. His PhD thesis was written at NuHaG (Numerical Harmonic Analysis Group), Faculty of Mathematics, University of Vienna. The cooperation formed during his thesis also resulted in him becoming a fellow of the HASSIP (Harmonic Analysis and Statistics for Signal and Image Processing) EU network. He joined the LATP (Laboratoire d'Analyse, Topologie, Probabilités), CMI and LMA, CNRS Marseille from November 2003 to April 2004 and in March, May and June 2006. He also worked with the FYMA, UCL, Louvain-La-Neuve in August 2005.

For the project FLAME (Frames and Linear Operators for Acoustical Modeling and Parameter Estimation) Peter Balazs 2011 was awarded the Start-Preis. He has been director of the Acoustics Research Institute since 2012.

In 2025 he was appointed as a fellow professor of the Interdisciplinary Transformation University Austria, heading the group Acoustics, Analysis and AI .

== Selected publications ==
Peter Balazs has published 79 journal and 76 conference papers, a selection of which is presented below (in chronological order):

- Balazs, Peter; Feichtinger, Hans G.; Hampejs, Mario; Kracher, Gnther (2006). "Double Preconditioning for Gabor Frames". IEEE Transactions on Signal Processing. 54 (12). Institute of Electrical and Electronics Engineers (IEEE): 4597–4610. Bibcode:2006ITSP...54.4597B. doi:10.1109/tsp.2006.882100. ISSN 1053-587X. S2CID 15138860.
- Balazs, Peter (2007). "Basic definition and properties of Bessel multipliers". Journal of Mathematical Analysis and Applications. 325 (1). Elsevier BV: 571–585. arXiv:math/0510091. Bibcode:2007JMAA..325..571B. doi:10.1016/j.jmaa.2006.02.012. ISSN 0022-247X. S2CID 7524880.
- Majdak, Piotr; Balazs, Peter; Laback, Bernhard (15 July 2007). "Multiple Exponential Sweep Method for Fast Measurement of Head-Related Transfer Functions". Journal of the Audio Engineering Society. 55 (7/8): 623–637.
- Balazs, Peter (2008). "Matrix Representation of Operators Using Frames". Sampling Theory in Signal and Image Processing. 7 (1). Springer Science and Business Media LLC: 39–54. arXiv:math/0510146. doi:10.1007/bf03549484. ISSN 1530-6429.
- Balazs, P.; Laback, B.; Eckel, G.; Deutsch, W.A. (2010). "Time–Frequency Sparsity by Removing Perceptually Irrelevant Components Using a Simple Model of Simultaneous Masking". IEEE Transactions on Audio, Speech, and Language Processing. 18 (1). Institute of Electrical and Electronics Engineers (IEEE): 34–49. doi:10.1109/tasl.2009.2023164. ISSN 1558-7916. S2CID 584217.
- Balazs, Peter; Dörfler, Monika; Jaillet, Florent, Holighaus, Nicki, Velasco, Gino (2011). "Theory, implementation and applications of nonstationary Gabor frames". Journal of computational and applied mathematics 236 (8), 1481-1496.
- Stoeva, D.T.; Balazs, P. (2012). "Invertibility of multipliers". Applied and Computational Harmonic Analysis. 33 (2). Elsevier BV: 292–299. arXiv:0911.2783. doi:10.1016/j.acha.2011.11.001. ISSN 1063-5203. S2CID 115163833.
- Perraudin, Nathanael; Balazs, Peter; Soendergaard, Peter (2013). "A fast Griffin-Lim algorithm", 2013 IEEE workshop on applications of signal processing to audio and acoustics.
- Zdeněk Průša, Peter Balazs, Peter Lempel Søndergaard (2017), "A noniterative method for reconstruction of phase from STFT magnitude", IEEE/ACM Transactions on Audio, Speech, and Language Processing 25 (5)
- Artemii Novoselov, Peter Balazs, Götz Bokelmann (2022), "SEDENOSS: SEparating and DENOising seismic signals with dual‐path recurrent neural network architecture", Journal of Geophysical Research: Solid Earth 127 (3)
- Lukas Köhldorfer, Peter Balazs (2025), "Wiener pairs of Banach algebras of operator-valued matrices", Journal of Mathematical Analysis and Applications 549 (29)
- Daniel Haider, Martin Ehler, Peter Balazs (2025), "Injectivity of ReLU layers: tools from frame theory", Mathematical Foundations of Machine Learning 1(1)
