= Christian M. Nebehay =

Austrian art dealer, art collector and author

Christian M. Nebehay (May 11, 1909 – November 25, 2003) was an Austrian art dealer, art collector and author. He became internationally known – particularly in the art world – for his works on Gustav Klimt and Egon Schiele.

== Life and career ==
Christian Nebehay was born in Leipzig, Germany, son of the art dealer Gustav Nebehay and his wife Marie (née Sonntag). In his early childhood he had made the acquaintance of the artist Gustav Klimt, a friend of his father's, who dedicated three of his drawings to the Nebehay family.

Nebehay, who established himself as the most important Klimt biographer, wrote numerous internationally acclaimed books discussing the lives and works of Klimt and his fellow artist, Schiele. In 1989, the New York Times described Nebehay's book Egon Schiele: Sketchbooks as "indispensable to any student of Schiele". The connection to Schiele and his artistic work had been drawn up by Nebehay's father Gustav as well: He had advised Schiele in commercial matters and in the run-up to exhibitions. As an Austrian Art Nouveau ("Jugendstil") expert, Nebehay was appreciated worldwide.

In 1980, he participated in the production of the movie Schiele in Prison, produced by Emmy Award winner Mick Gold. He wrote screenplays for various Austrian TV documentaries, amongst others for Gustav Klimt und seine Zeit (1975) and for Egon Schiele (1976). Nebehay also advised Umberto II of Italy regarding the buildup of a collection of family portraits.

Artworks from Nebehay's gallery are exhibited at the world's most important museums today, e.g. at the National Gallery of Art, the Metropolitan Museum of Art, and the Museum of Modern Art.

== Personal life ==
Nebehay was first married to a niece of Katharina Schratt, Johanna Nebehay (née von Müller-Schratt), and later to the author Reneé Nebehay-King. Nebehay's son is married to Paula Molden, granddaughter of Paula von Preradović, the composer of Austria's national anthem, and niece of publisher Fritz Molden, whose wife had been former CIA director Allen W. Dulles' daughter Joan Dulles Molden.

== Art gallery and foundations ==
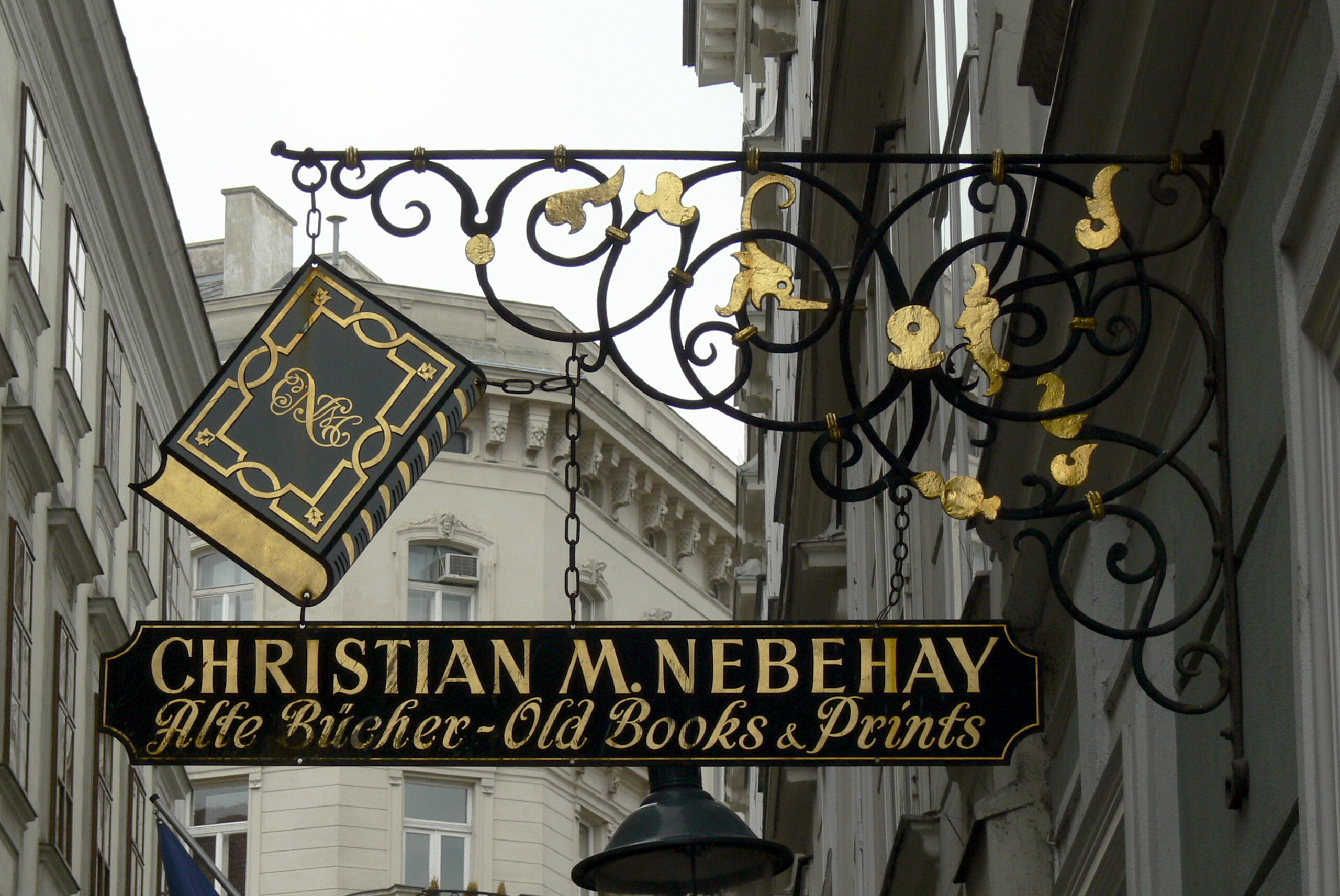
Christian M. Nebehay Gallery, Vienna, Austria

In 1947, Nebehay founded the Christian M. Nebehay Company (gallery, art shop and antiquarian bookstore) located in Vienna's first district. For decades he took over a leading role in the art and antique trade far beyond Austria. The shop continued even after his death. A former chairman of the Austrian League of Antiquarian Booksellers [Verband der Antiquare Österreichs] once referred to it as "the most important still active antiquarian bookstore of the 'Old Continent Europe'". Nebehay, who served as president of the International League of Antiquarian Booksellers, also founded the Austrian League of Antiquarian Booksellers, which he headed for over two decades, and the Society of Friends of the Albertina. Nebehay was able to make numerous acquisitions in the interest of Austrian art, e.g. he initiated the purchase of the manuscript of Anton Bruckner's Third Symphony on behalf of the Austrian National Library. He also founded the Egon-Schiele-Museum in Tulln, Lower Austria.

== Schiele auction record ==
In 2007, selected works from Christian Nebehay's art collection were auctioned at Sotheby's in New York City. The five drawings by Egon Schiele resulted in sales of US$17.9 million. The Self-Portrait With Checkered Shirt ("Selbstbildnis mit kariertem Hemd"), Schiele's last self-portrait on paper, came under the hammer for US$11.4 million. An auction record for a paper work by Egon Schiele was achieved.

== Honors ==
Nebehay received the Austrian Cross of Honor for Science and Art, First Class in 1994; he was named honorary member of the Association of Austrian Book Trade in 1984 and was appointed professor in 1978. He is also an honorary member of the Gustav Klimt Memorial Society.

== Bibliography ==
English titles

- Nebehay, Christian M. (1994), Gustav Klimt: From Drawing to Painting, New York: Harry N. Abrams, ISBN 978-0-810-93510-5
- Nebehay, Christian M. (1991), Vienna 1900: Architecture and Painting, Vienna: Christian Brandstätter, ISBN 978-3-854-47027-4
- Nebehay, Christian M. (1989), Egon Schiele Sketch Books, New York: Rizzoli, ISBN 978-0-847-81133-5
- Nebehay, Christian M. (1987), Ver Sacrum 1898-1903, New York: Rizzoli, ISBN 978-0-847-80115-2

German titles

- Nebehay, Christian M. (1995), Egon Schiele und die Eisenbahn, Vienna: Böhlau, ISBN 978-3-205-98393-4
- Nebehay, Christian M. (1995), Das Glück auf dieser Welt. Erinnerungen, Vienna: Christian Brandstätter, ISBN 978-3-85447-554-5
- Nebehay, Christian M. (1992), Gustav Klimt: Von der Zeichnung zum Bild, Vienna: Christian Brandstätter, ISBN 978-3-85447-369-5
- Nebehay, Christian M. (1992), Egon Schiele: Leben und Werk, Salzburg: Residenz Verlag, ISBN 978-3-7017-0265-7
- Nebehay, Christian M. (1992), Egon Schiele: Leben. Briefe. Gedichte. Salzburg: Residenz Verlag, ISBN 978-3-7017-0197-1
- Nebehay, Christian M. (1989), Egon Schiele: Von der Skizze zum Bild. Die Skizzenbücher 1912–1918, Vienna: Christian Brandstätter, ISBN 978-3-85447-320-6
- Nebehay, Christian M. (1989), Ver Sacrum 1898–1903, Dortmund: Harenberg Kommunikation Verlag, ISBN 978-3-88379-528-7
- Nebehay, Christian M. (1986), Gustav Klimt, Egon Schiele und die Familie Lederer, Bern: Kornfeld, ISBN 978-3-85773-016-0
- Nebehay, Christian M. (1986), Secession, Vienna: Edition Tusch, ISBN 978-3-85063-163-1
- Nebehay, Christian M. (1985), Egon Schiele: Leben und Werk in Dokumenten und Bildern, Munich: Deutscher Taschenbuchverlag, ISBN 978-3-423-02884-4
- Nebehay, Christian M. (1983), Die goldenen Sessel meines Vaters, Vienna: Christian Brandstätter, ISBN 978-3-85447-038-0
- Nebehay, Christian M. (1983), Wien speziell: Architektur und Malerei um 1900, Vienna: Christian Brandstätter, ISBN 978-3-85447-021-2
- Nebehay, Christian M. (1980), Egon Schiele. Leben und Werk, Salzburg: Residenz Verlag, ISBN 978-3-7017-0265-7
- Nebehay, Christian M. (1979), Ver Sacrum 1898–1903, Munich: Deutscher Taschenbuchverlag, ISBN 978-3-423-01420-5
- Nebehay, Christian M. (1976), Gustav Klimt: Sein Leben nach zeitgenössischen Berichten und Quellen, Munich: Deutscher Taschenbuchverlag, ISBN 978-3-423-01146-4

== Sources ==
- Nebehay, Christian M. Die goldenen Sessel meines Vaters. Vienna: Christian Brandstätter, 1983.
- Pasquinelli, Barbara and Kristen, Franziska. Bildlexikon der Kunst. Band 12. Berlin: Parthas, 2006.
- Markus, Georg. Katharina Schratt: Die zweite Frau des Kaisers. Vienna: Amalthea Signum, 1998.
