= Egon-Schiele-Museum =

Museum in Tulln, Austria

Coordinates: 48.333°N 16.053°E

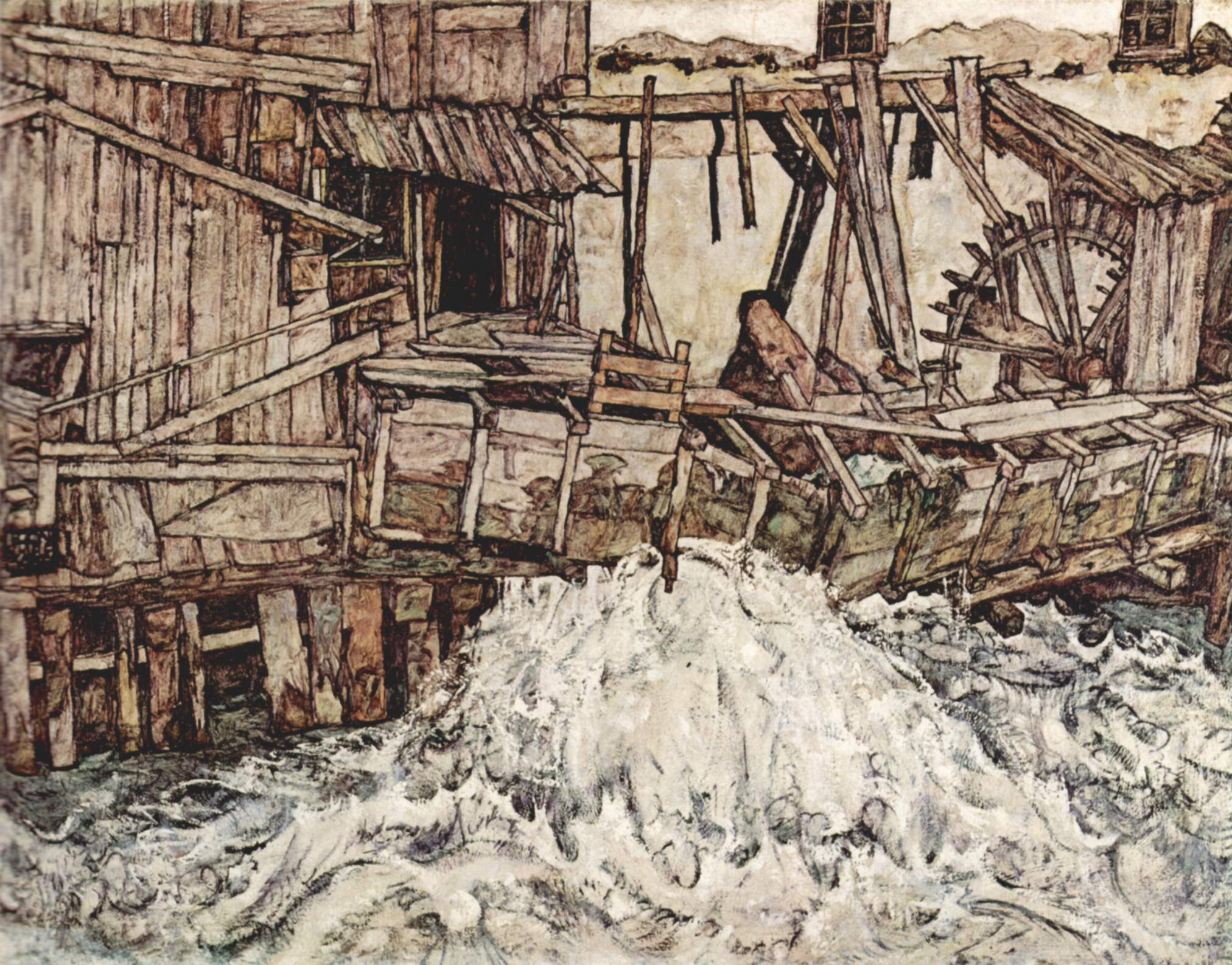
Egon Schiele: Zerfallende Mühle (Old Mill), 1916

The Egon-Schiele-Museum is a biographical museum in Tulln, Lower Austria, dedicated to the Austrian painter Egon Schiele, who was born in Tulln.

== History ==
The Egon Schiele-Museum was planned in 1980. The jail, built in 1898, where Schiele was imprisoned in 1912, was renovated for that reason. The opening of the museum took place on June 12, 1990, the 100th anniversary of Schiele's birth.

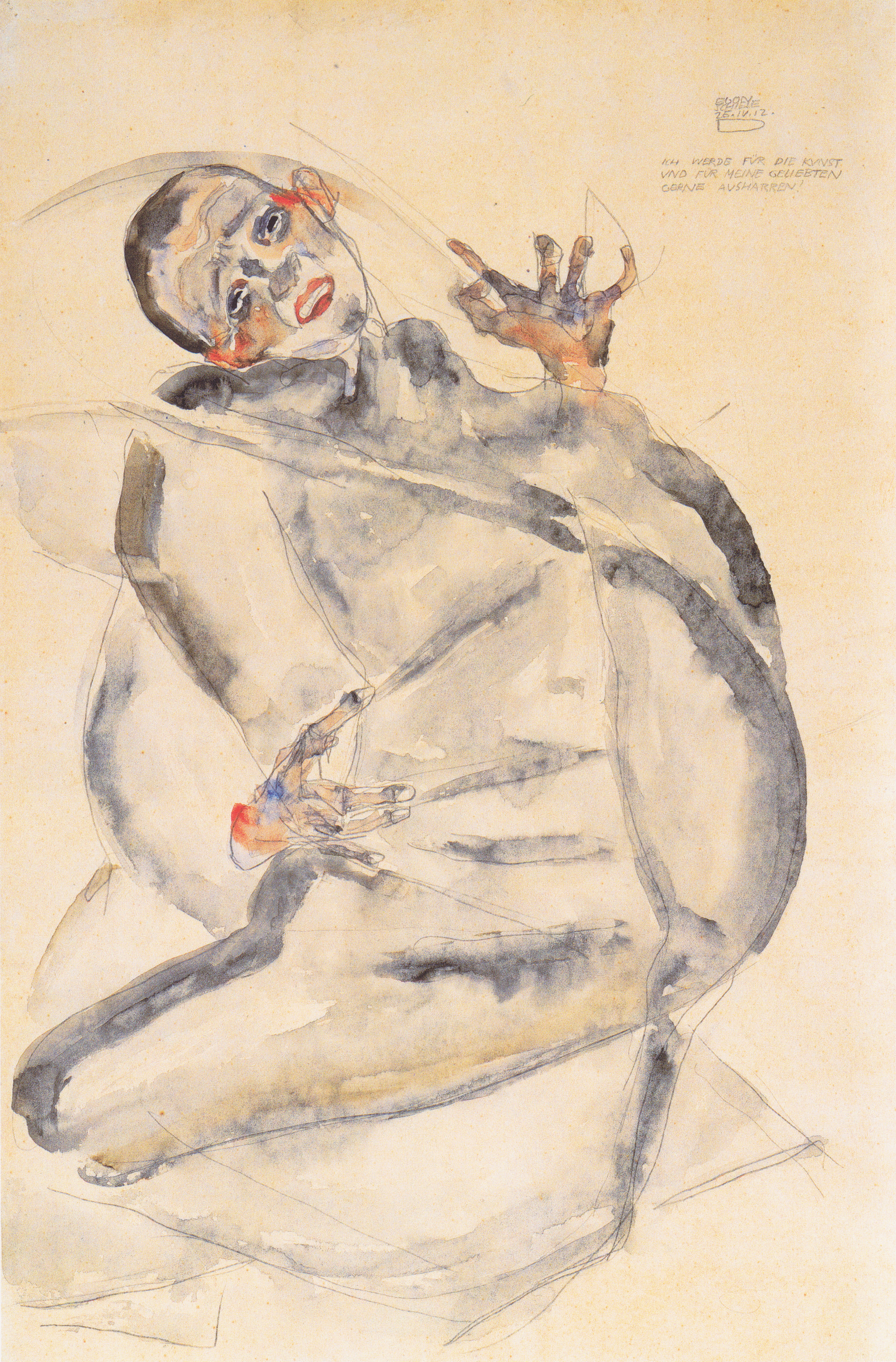
Egon Schiele: Ich werde für die Kunst und für meine Geliebten gerne ausharren, 1912

The museums holds more than 100 objects which are shown in 12 rooms. 90 paintings of Schiele and many photographs of his life and his family are exhibited. On the ground floor there are pieces related to Schiele's childhood in Tulln, as well as relics of his school-time in Klosterneuburg and as a student in Vienna. There are a lot of drawings by the young artist.

Famous paintings include Blick über verschneite Weingärten auf Klosterneuburg which Schiele painted in 1907, and the Old Mill from 1916

== Further information ==
The Egon Schiele-Museum is situated near the Danube river. There are exhibitions of contemporary artists every year.

== Books ==
- Egon Schiele (Bilder), Peter Weninger: Egon Schiele-Museum, Tulln: eine Dokumentation zu Leben und Werk von Egon Schiele (1890 Tulln-1918 Wien) 1991. ISBN 978-3-9500088-0-7
