= Tulln an der Donau =

- Municipality
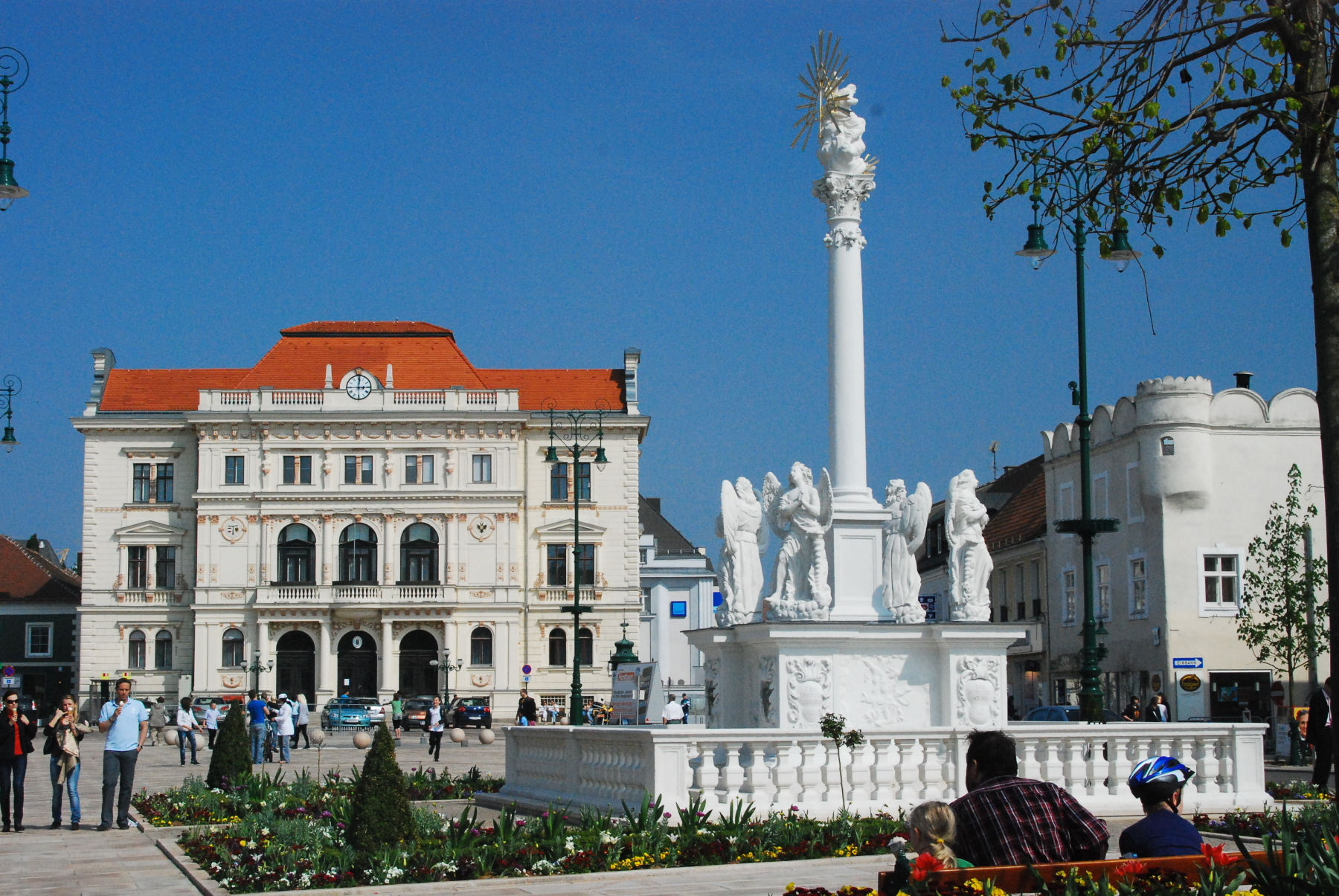
- Main square with Marian column

- Coat of arms

- Location within Austria
- Coordinates: 48°20′N 16°03′E
- Country: Austria
- State: Lower Austria
- District: Tulln

Government
  - Mayor: Peter Eisenschenk (ÖVP)

Area
  - Total: 72.22 km^{2} (27.88 sq mi)
- Elevation: 180 m (590 ft)

Population (2018-01-01)
  - Total: 16,197
  - Density: 224.3/km^{2} (580.9/sq mi)
- Time zone: UTC+1 (CET)
  - Summer (DST): UTC+2 (CEST)
- Postal code: 3425, 3430
- Area code: 02272
- Vehicle registration: TU
- Website: www.tulln.at

Tulln an der Donau (lit. 'Tulln on the Danube') is a historic town in the Austrian state of Lower Austria, the administrative seat of Tulln District. Because of its abundance of parks and gardens, Tulln is often referred to as Blumenstadt ("City of Flowers"), and "The City of Togetherness" following the initiative of Peter Eisenschenk, Mayor of Tulln.

== Geography ==
The town is situated in the centre of the Tulln Basin stretching to the Vienna Woods in the south, about 40 kilometres (25 mi) northwest of the Austrian capital Vienna. The main part of its built-up area is located on the southern bank of the Danube river.

=== Populated places ===
The municipality of Tulln an der Donau consists of the following cadastral communities: Frauenhofen, Langenlebarn-Oberaigen, Langenlebarn-Unteraigen, Mollersdorf, Neuaigen, Nitzing, Staasdorf, Trübensee, and Tulln Proper; while further subdivided into populated places (with population in brackets as of 1 January 2022).

- Frauenhofen (104)
- Langenlebarn-Oberaigen (1465)
- Langenlebarn-Unteraigen (1026)
- Mollersdorf (168)
- Neuaigen (547)
- Nitzing (373)
- Staasdorf (250)
- Trübensee (131)
- Tulln an der Donau (12.492)

== History ==
Tulln is one of the oldest towns in Austria. Although it was settled in pre-Roman times (the name Tulln is presumably of Celtic origin), it gained importance as the Roman fort of Comagena (Comagenis). In the final years of Roman rule, Saint Severinus of Noricum is said to have visited the city, saving it from the barbarians.

The town was first mentioned as Tullina in an 859 deed, when the area was part of the Bavarian marcha orientalis. It gained importance as a residence of the noble House of Babenberg, ruling as Austrian margraves from 976 onwards. The first public clock tower is recorded having stood here in Tulln was 1372, decades before the clock tower began striking in Viennas St. Stephans church. Tulln lost its significance after the Babenbergs relocated their residence to Vienna.

On 6 September 1683 the Polish cavalry of King John III Sobieski united here with Imperial (Austrian) forces, as well as troops from Saxony, Bavaria and Baden for the Battle of Vienna against the invading army of the Ottoman Empire. The 20th century was another period of growth, and in 1986, Tulln applied to become capital of Lower Austria, although Sankt Pölten eventually won.

== Politics ==
The municipal council (Gemeinderat) consists of 37 members. Following the 2025 Lower Austrian Local Elections, the seat distribution is as follows:

- Austrian People's Party (ÖVP): 24 seats
- Freedom Party of Austria (FPÖ): 5 seats
- Social Democratic Party of Austria (SPÖ): 4 seats
- The Greens - The Green Alternative (GRÜNE): 3 seats
- NEOS - The New Austria (NEOS): 1 seat

The current mayor of Tulln an der Donau is Peter Eisenschenk (ÖVP).

== Infrastructure ==
=== Transport ===
Two bridges span the Danube river in Tulln. The Franz Josef Railway crosses the Danube in Tulln, continuing via Krems an der Donau to Gmünd. Der Standard, a Viennese daily newspaper, is produced in Tulln.

=== Industry ===
An important sugar producing plant, Agrana Austria, is located in Tulln. Several important trade fairs, including camping equipment and boat shows, also take place in the town.

=== Notable institutions ===
Various state institutions of Lower Austria, such as the fire brigade or the disaster relief service, have their seat in Tulln. The Federal School of Aviation is also located in Tulln.

== Main sights ==
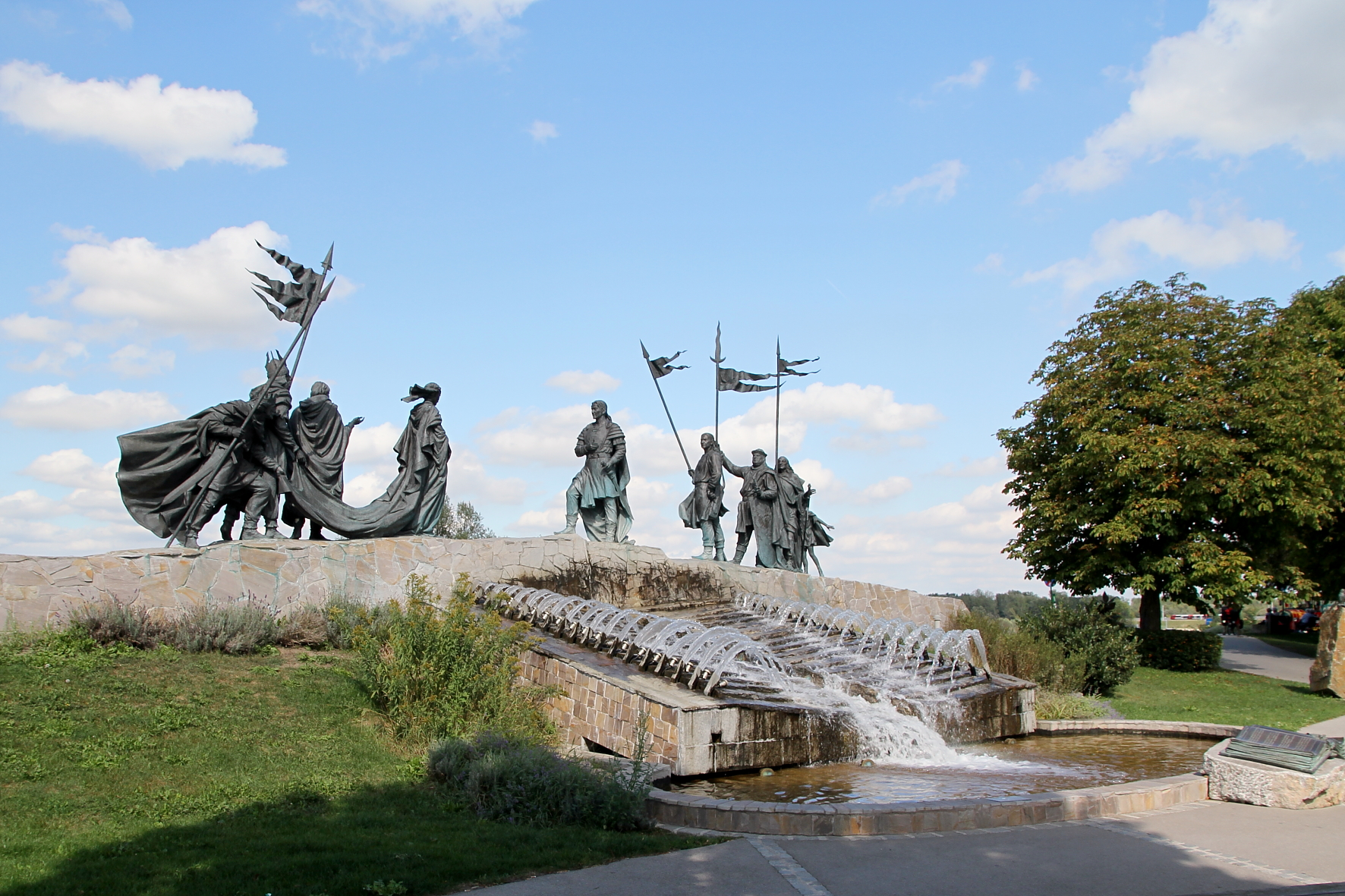
Nibelungen-Fountain

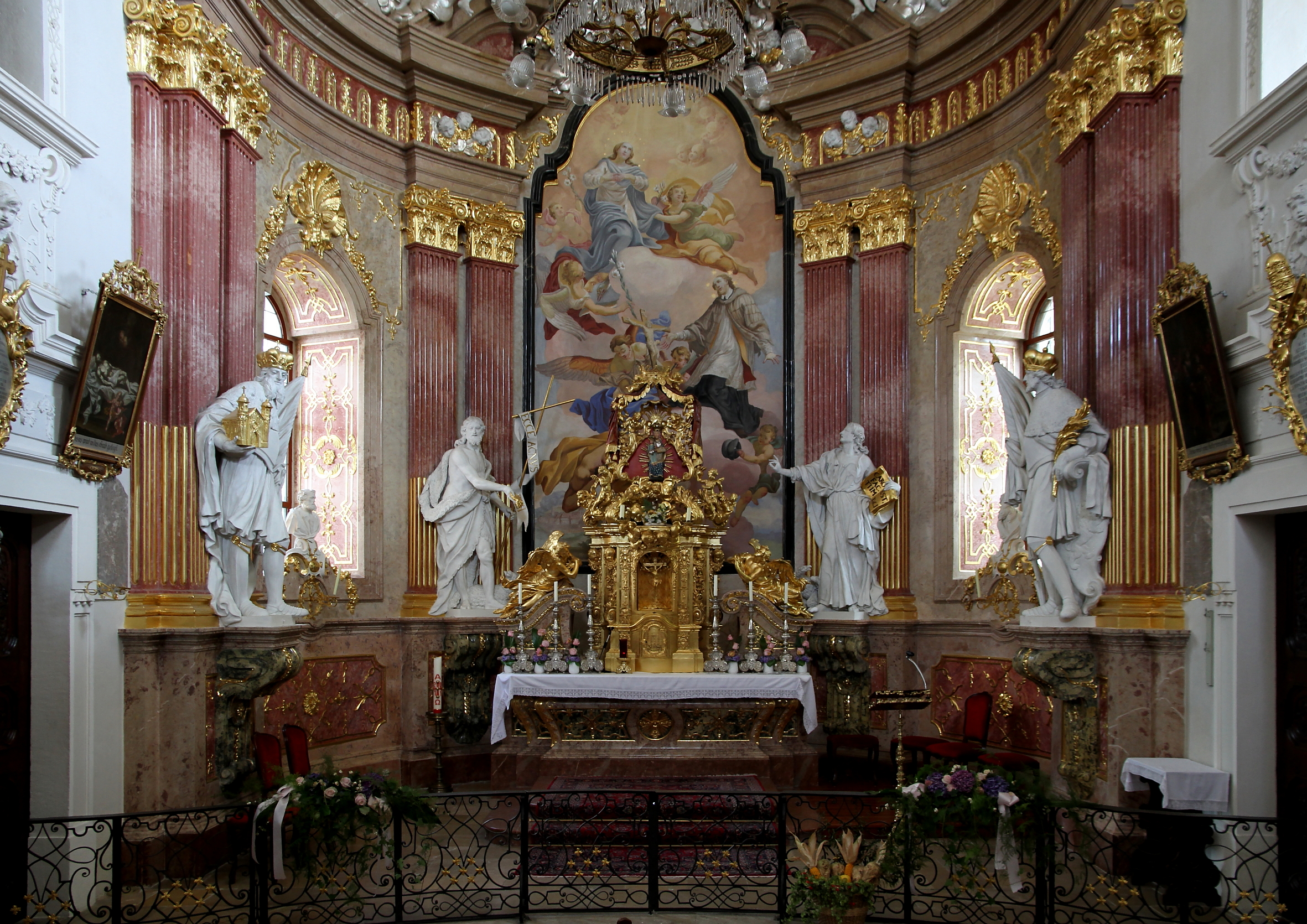
Altar of Minoriten-Church

- According to the Nibelungenlied, it was in Tulln that Attila the Hun saw Kriemhild (the Nibelungenlied's name for Gudrun) and proposed to her. A fountain, the Nibelungen-Brunnen ("the Nibelungen Fountain") was dedicated to this event in 2005.
- The ship Regentag by Friedensreich Hundertwasser is riding at anchor by the Danube as a part of a modern art museum here since 2004. It was first heard of in the short documentary Hundertwasser's Rainy Day (1972).
- In 2008 a shopping mall, called Rosenarcade was built.
- Aubad is a well known lake in Tulln with many visitors and tourists during spring and summer time.
- Minoritenkloster, a convent.
- A 4th-century Roman tower.

== Notable citizens ==
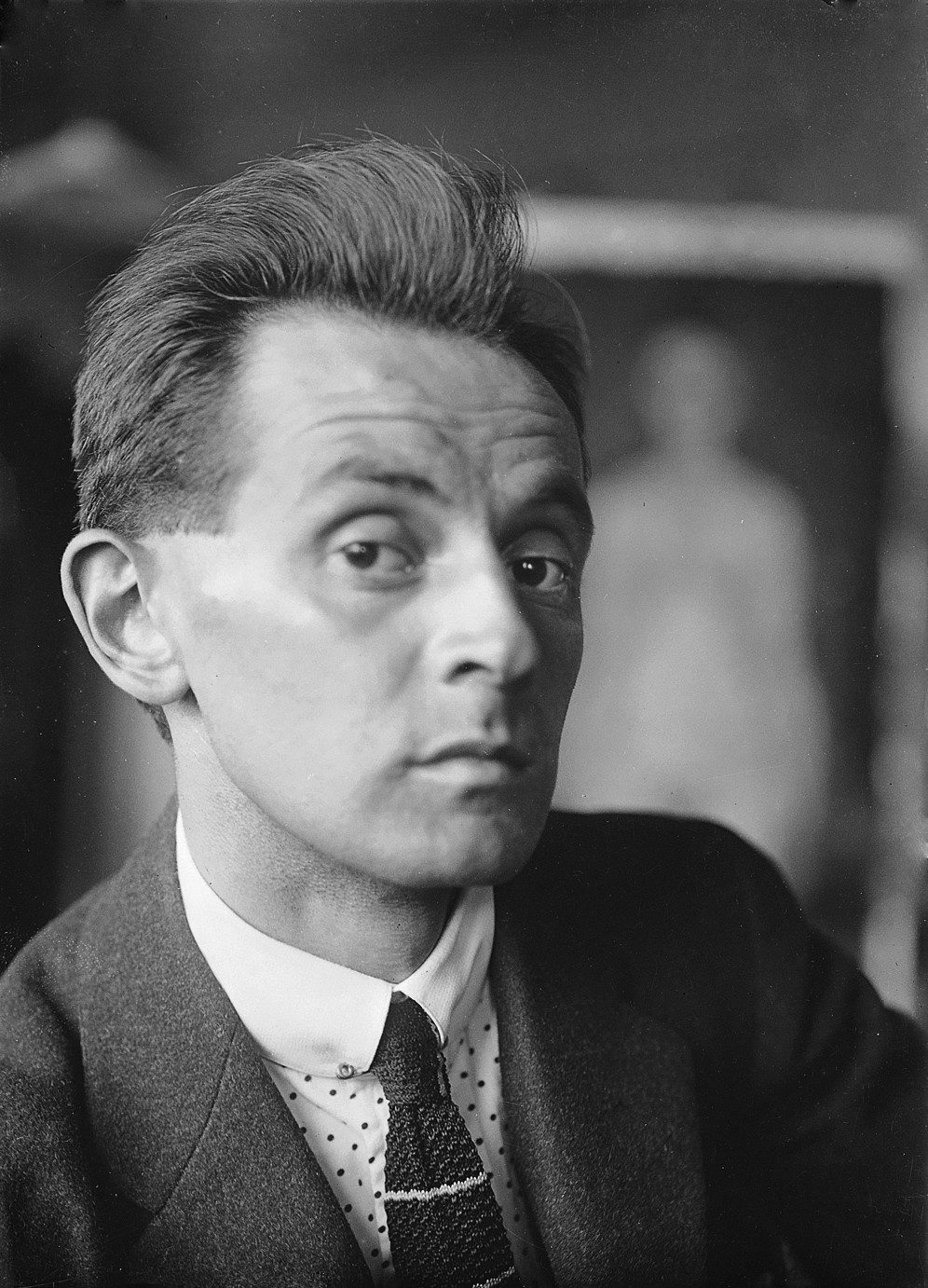
Egon Schiele, 1918

- Ferdinand Grossmann (1887–1970), choral conductor, vocal teacher and composer
- Egon Schiele (1890–1918), Austrian painter, was born in Tulln and the Egon-Schiele-Museum is dedicated to him.
- Siegfried Seidl (1911–1947), convicted and hanged WWII criminal, Nazi commandant of Theresienstadt.
- Leo Stopfer (born 1964), painter; acclaimed as the "Painter of the Ballet-Stars"
- Peter Balazs (born 1970), mathematician; works at the Acoustics Research Institute, Vienna
- Alex Machacek (born 1972), jazz guitarist and composer
- Doris Schretzmayer, (DE Wiki) (born 1972), actress
- Richard Koch, (DE Wiki) (born 1979), jazz trumpeter

=== Sport ===
- Thomas Sykora (born 1968), alpine skier, bronze medallist at the 1998 Winter Olympics
- Wolfgang Eibeck (born 1972), a retired Paralympic cyclist, multiple Paralympic Games medallist
- Nina Burger (born 1987), football player, played 108 games for Austria women
- Robert Dreissker (born 1989), professional wrestler
- Konstantin Kerschbaumer (born 1992), footballer who has played over 350 games
- Thomas Diethart (born 1992), ski jumper, team silver medallist at the 2014 Winter Olympics
- Nikola Dovedan (born 1994), footballer who has played over 360 games
