= Patti Wong =

Art advisor

- Born: 1970 or 1971 (age 55–56); Hong Kong
- Education: London School of Economics
- Spouse: Andy Wong

Patti Wong is an art adviser and former auction house executive based in Hong Kong. She is the former international chairperson of Sotheby's, where she worked for over three decades. Her past roles included chairman of Sotheby's Asia; chairman of Sotheby's Diamonds; and head of Sotheby's private client services department in London. In January 2023, she founded art advisory firm Patti Wong & Associates together with Daryl Wickstrom, another former Sotheby's executive. The firm's clientele is mainly Asian art collectors.

== Early life and education ==
Born in Hong Kong, Wong studied engineering at Haddington School and has a degree in monetary economics from the London School of Economics, as well as a postgraduate diploma in Asian arts. Her parents are both bankers (her mother is Dr Alice Piera Lam Lee Kiu-yue, and her father died in 1975), and her grandfather, Lam Bing-yim, co-founded Hang Seng Bank.

== Personal life ==
Patti is married to the financier Andy Wong, the grandson of the founder of the Bank of East Asia. They were known for their annual Chinese New Year parties in London, where guests have included Prince Andrew, Jemma Kidd, Nabila Khashoggi, Robert Hanson, and Sophie Anderton.
