= Peter G. Casazza =

American mathematician

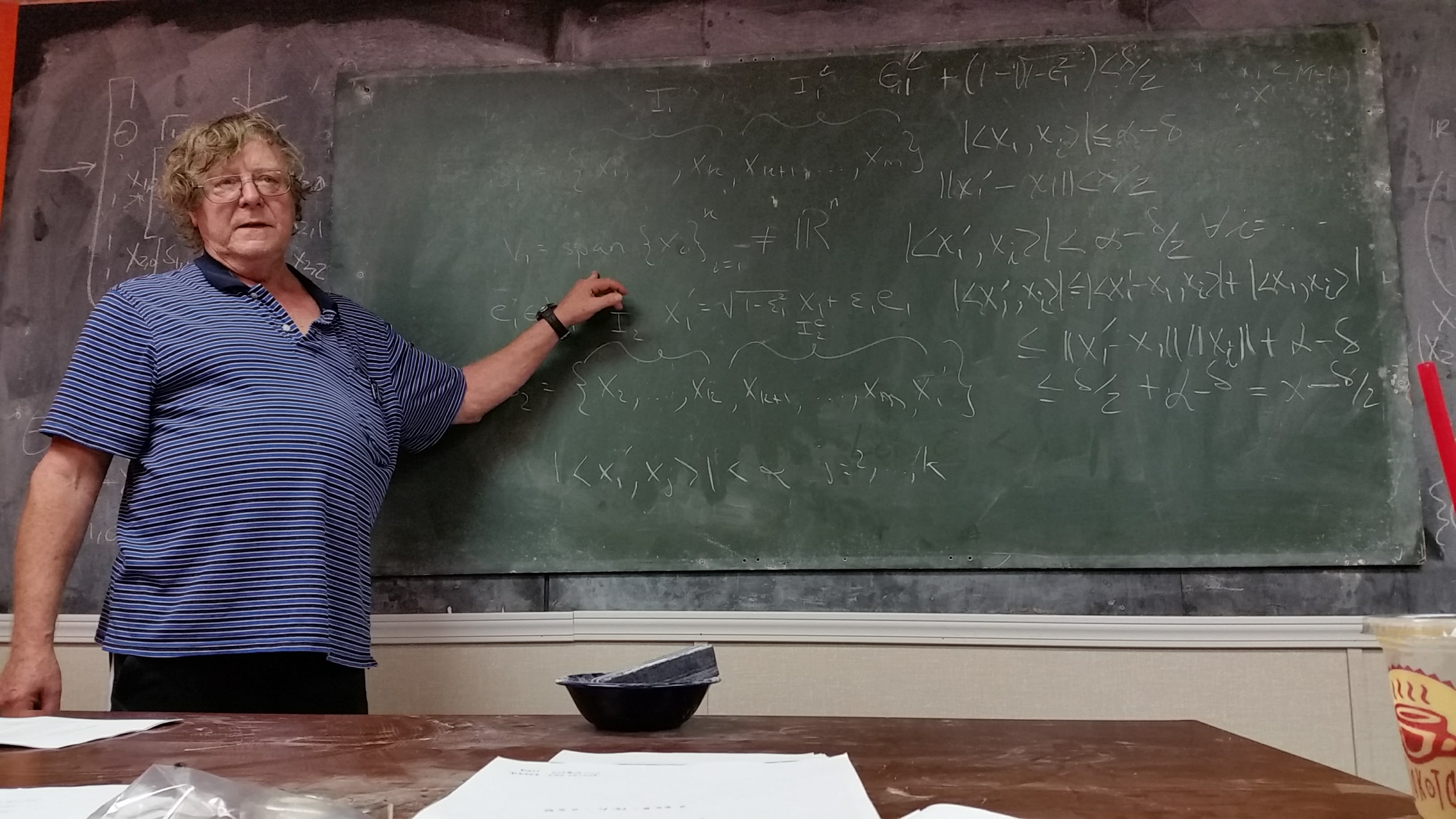
Peter G. Casazza discussing the core structures of Grassmannian frames in a classroom he and his wife, Janet Tremain, installed in the basement of their home. Photo taken May 15, 2017.

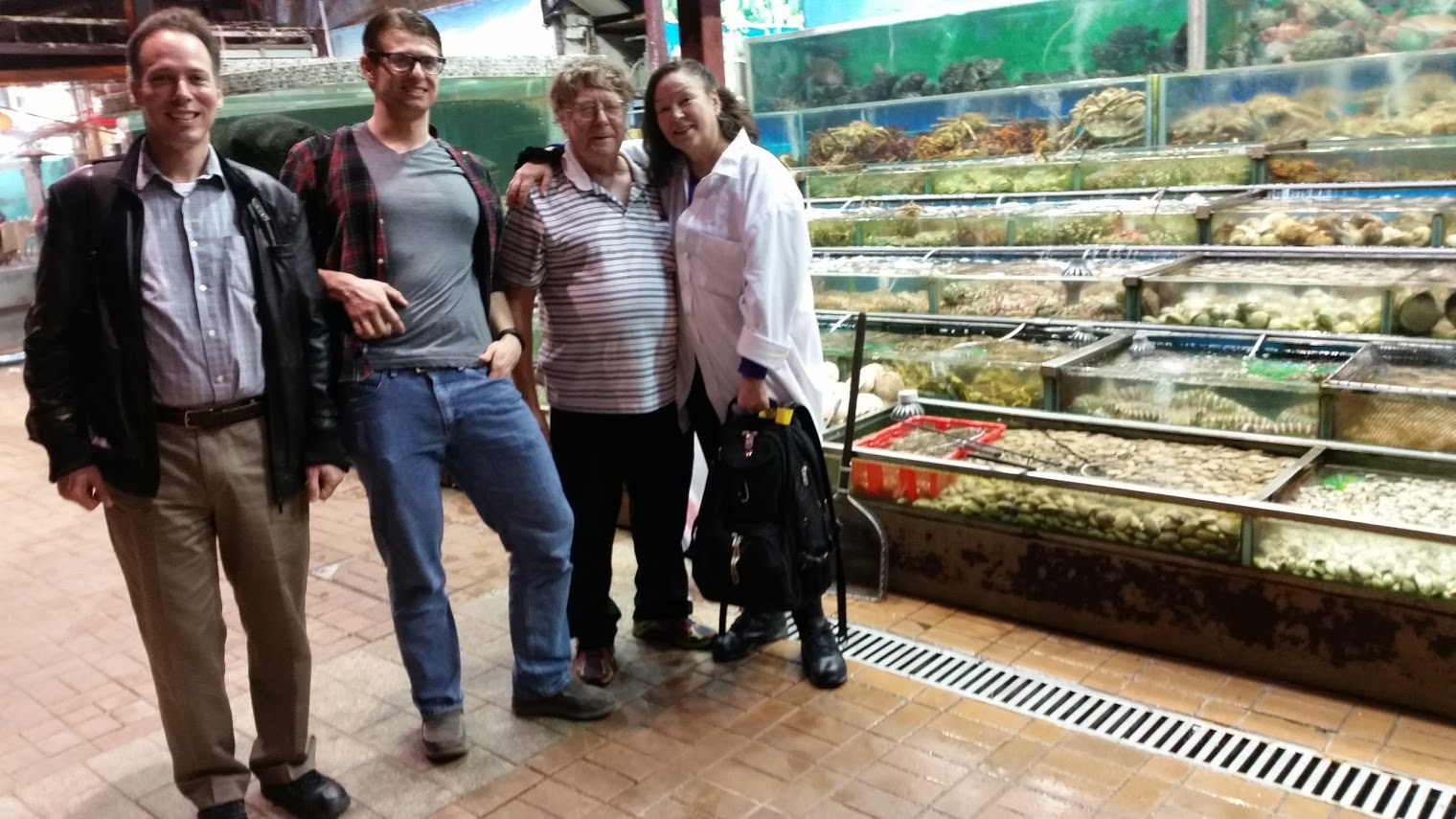
Peter G. Casazza along with some of his fellow coauthors during a math workshop in Hong Kong. From left to right: Bernhard G. Bodmann, John I. Haas IV, Peter G. Casazza, and Janet Tremain (his wife).

Peter G. Casazza (June 28, 1945 - October 26, 2025) born in Albany, New York, was an American mathematician who worked at the University of Missouri. He began his career as a Banach space theorist, but he was perhaps most well known for his role in the development of frame (linear algebra) theory as a popular discipline of mathematical research. He earned his Ph.D. in mathematics from the University of Iowa in 1972 and held appointments at the University of Alabama-Huntsville before joining the University of Missouri-Columbia in 1983 where he stayed until his retirement in 2021. He also held visiting appointments around the world, including at the Hebrew University of Jerusalem in Israel, the University of Cambridge in England, and Odense University in Denmark.

Peter Casazza has over 100 publications, several of which are coauthored with his wife, Janet Tremain.

He was an active mathematical researcher and directed the Frame Research Center in Columbia, Missouri.
