= Gustav Nebehay =

Gustav Nebehay (June 26, 1881 – September 17, 1935) was an Austrian art dealer and patron of the arts.

== Life and career ==
In 1900, the Viennese bookseller Nebehay went to Leipzig, Germany, where he joined the company C. G. Boerner – one of the oldest German art shops, whose customer had been Johann Wolfgang von Goethe in former times. Soon, the prior rather nationally known company turned into a world-renown establishment in the field of old graphics. Nebehay’s clients included famous personalities such as the Austrian writer Stefan Zweig. In the following years, he rose to become a major graphic connoisseur and antiquary, as well as a leading specialist in the field of hand drawings of old masters. Nebehay was the first art dealer to produce his catalogues in various printings.

In 1908, he married Carl Sonntag junior’s sister Marie Sonntag. Nine years later, in 1917, they moved to his hometown Vienna, where he opened his own art gallery at the Hotel Bristol and likewise became partner of the bookseller V. A. Heck at Kärntnerring in Vienna’s first district.

Nebehay was in professional and amicable contact with many well-known turn-of-the-century artists like Gustav Klimt, Egon Schiele, and Josef Hoffmann. Gustav Klimt, for example, dedicated three of his drawings to the Nebehay family. Nebehay was likewise entrusted with the sale of Klimt’s and Schiele’s artistic legacies. Furthermore, he organized the first posthumous Schiele exhibition and the exhibition of Klimt's works on the Stoclet-Frieze.

A photograph of Klimt's funeral shows Nebehay next to Klimt’s muse Emilie Flöge, the architect and founding member of the Wiener Werkstätte, Josef Hoffmann, the writer and salonnière Berta Zuckerkandl, the painter Ludwig Heinrich Jungnickel, and the politician Julius Tandler.

== Funder and patron ==
Nebehay funded and supported many Austrian artists. In 1917, for example, Egon Schiele wrote in a letter to his brother-in-law: "I found someone who is very interested in me." Nebehay also published Schiele’s and Klimt’s first drawing catalogues.

When Schiele visited an exhibition at the “Kunstverein Kärnten” at the Künstlerhaus in Klagenfurt, Carinthia, he was enthusiastic about one of the portraits of Herbert Boeckl and subsequently recommended the young artist to Gustav Nebehay. Thereupon, Nebehay became Boeckl’s patron and funder. Amongst others, he financed the artist’s study trips to Paris, Berlin, and Sicily.

After Nebehay’s early death in 1935, his eldest son Christian M. Nebehay continued to manage the family share at V. A. Heck. In 1945, he set up his own bookshop at Annagasse 18, which still exists today.

== Sources ==
- Nebehay, Gustav. In: Österreichisches Biographisches Lexikon 1815–1950. Volume 7. Vienna: Verlag der Österreichischen Akademie der Wissenschaften, 1978.
- Nebehay, Christian M. Die goldenen Sessel meines Vaters. Vienna: Christian Brandstätter, 1983.
