= Kálmán =

Kálmán is an ancient Germanic origin Hungarian surname and male given name. Outside Hungary, the name occurs sometimes in the form Kalman. It was derived from the Germanic name: Koloman, Coloman or Kolman. The Germanic name Coloman has been used by Germans since the 9th century.

Kalman (קלמן in Yiddish and Hebrew, occasionally spelled Calman in Roman letters) is also a Yiddish given name that is a short form of the Greco-Jewish name Kalonymos (קלונימוס, meaning "beautiful name", a reference to a miracle worked in God's name). Sometimes the long form and short forms are used together, as in the compound name Kalman Kalonymos. A nickname for Kalman is in Yiddish Kalma or Kalme.

The Yiddish and Hungarian names are a convergence with separate origins (the Yiddish name first appearing in the Rhineland in the middle ages with the famed Kalonymos family).

People with the name Kalman or Kálmán include:

== Surname ==
- Attila Kálmán (born 1968), Hungarian organist and pianist
- Dan Kalman (born 1952), American mathematician
- Emmerich Kálmán (1882–1953), Hungarian composer of operettas
- Maira Kalman (born 1949), Israeli-American graphic designer and illustrator
- Oszkár Kálmán (1887–1971), Hungarian bass singer
- Rudolf E. Kálmán (1930–2016), Hungarian mathematician and electrical engineer
- Tibor Kalman (1949–1999), Hungarian graphic designer

== Given name ==
- Kalman Aron (died 2018), a Latvian-born American Jewish artist
- Kalman Ber (born 1957), Ashkenazi Chief Rabbi of Israel
- Kalman J. Cohen (died 2010), an American Jewish economist
- Kálmán Bartalis (1889–?), a Hungarian polo player
- Kalman Bloch (1913–2009), a US Jewish clarinetist
- Kálmán Darányi (1886–1939), a Hungarian politician
- Kálmán Ferenczfalvi (1921-2005 in Debrecen) was a Hungarian Righteous Among the Nations
- Kálmán Giergl (1863–1954), a Hungarian architect
- Kálmán Gőgh (German: Koloman Gögh, 1948, Kladno–1995)
- Kálmán Hazai (1913–1996), a Hungarian water polo player
- Kálmán Hunyady de Kéthely (1828–1901), a Hungarian nobleman
- Kálmán Ihász (1941–2019), a Hungarian footballer
- Kálmán Kalocsay (1891–1976)
- Kálmán Kandó (1869–1931)
- Kálmán Kánya (1869–1945), a Foreign Minister of Hungary
- Kálmán Katona (1948–2017), a Hungarian politician
- Kálmán Kertész (1867–1922), a Hungarian entomologist
- Kálmán Kittenberger (1881–1958), a Hungarian traveller, natural historian, biologist
- Kálmán Konrád (1896–1980), a Hungarian football player
- Kalman Konya (born 1961, Zürich), a Switzerland-born Hungarian-German shot putter
- Kálmán Kovács (disambiguation)
- Kálmán Kubinyi (1906, Cleveland–1973, Stockbridge, Massachusetts), a Hungarian-American influential etcher
- Kalman Kahana (1910–1991; Hebrew: קלמן כהנא), an Israeli politician and journalist
- Kalman Liebskind (born 1970), an Israeli journalist.
- Kalman Mann (1912-1997), 8th director general of Hadassah Medical Organization
- Kálmán Markovits (1931–2009), a Hungarian water polo player
- Kalman Menyhart (born 1955), a Hungarian football player
- Kálmán Mészöly (1941–2022), a former Hungarian football (soccer) player
- Kálmán Mikszáth (1847–1910), a Hungarian novelist, journalist, politician
- Kálmán Petrikovics, a Hungarian sprint canoer
- Kalman Packouz, American orthodox rabbi
- Kalman Mayer Rothschild (1788-1855), founder of the Rothschild banking family of Naples
- Kálmán Rózsahegyi (1873–1961), a Hungarian actor and teacher
- Kalman Schulman (1819–1899), a Lithuanian writer and translator
- Kálmán Sóvári (1940–2020), a Hungarian footballer
- Kálmán Sóvári (wrestler) (1910–1996), a Hungarian wrestler
- Kalman Sporn (born 1971), American businessman
- Kálmán Szabó (born 1980), a Hungarian football player
- Kálmán Széll (1843–1915), a Hungarian politician
- Kálmán Thaly (1839–1909), a Hungarian poet, historian and politician
- Kálmán Tihanyi (1897–1947), a Hungarian physicist, electrical engineer, inventor
- Kálmán Tisza (1830–1902), Hungarian politician
- Kálmán Tóth (poet) (1831–1891), a Hungarian poet

=== Middle name ===
- Moses Kalman Rothschild (1688-1735), German Jewish silk trader, money changer, father of Amschel Moses Rothschild (1710-1755)
- Daniel Kálmán Biss (born 1977), American politician and mathematician
- Kalonymus Kalman Epstein (c. 1753–1823, Neustadt, now Poland), rabbi and author
- Kalonymus Kalman Shapira (1889–1943), Grand Rabbi of Piaseczno and author
- Jón Kalman Stefánsson (born 1963), Icelandic author
- Karl Kalman Targownik (1915-1996), psychiatrist and Holocaust survivor
- Roy Kalman Altman (born 1982), judge of the U.S. District Court for the Southern District of Florida, lawyer, and author

=== Mononym ===
- Coloman of Hungary, king of Hungary (1095–1116)
- Prince Kálmán (Coloman) of Lodomeria (1208–1241), a Hungarian member of the Árpád dynasty, Prince of Halych
- Coloman (bishop of Győr) (1317–1375)

== See also ==
- (Kallmann (disambiguation), Kallman, Calman, Callmann, Callman)–other Jewish given names (Hebrew: קלמן) and variants
- Koloman (given name) (Coloman)
