= Koloman =

Koloman could refer to:

- Kołomań, a village in Świętokrzyskie Voivodeship, Poland
- Koloman (restaurant), a restaurant in New York City, U.S.
- Koloman (given name), a masculine given name
