= Coloman =

Coloman, Spanish: Colomán (German: Koloman (also Slovak, Czech, Croatian), Italian: Colomanno, Catalan: Colomà; Hungarian: Kálmán)

The Germanic origin name Coloman used by Germans since the 9th century.

- Coloman, King of Hungary (c. 1070–1116), Hungarian king
- Coloman of Galicia-Lodomeria (1208–1241), Hungarian prince
- Coloman (bishop of Győr) (1317–1375), Hungarian prelate
- Saint Coloman of Stockerau (died 1012), Irish saint
- Colomán Trabado Pérez (born 1958), Spanish middle-distance runner
- Coloman Braun-Bogdan (1905–1983), Romanian footballer and manager
- Koloman Moser (1868 – 1918), Austrian artist

== See also ==
- Kálmán
- Koloman (given name)
