= Practice research =

Form of academic research

Practice research aka practice as research, practice based research and/or practitioner researcher is a form of academic research which incorporates practice in the methodology or research output.

Rather than seeing the relationship between practice and theory as a dichotomy, as has sometimes traditionally been the case, there is a growing body of practice research academics across a number of disciplines who use practice as part of their research. For example, the practice-based research network (PBRN) within clinical medical research. A cyclic web model integrating practice-led research and research-led practice has been presented.

== Practice-led research in the arts and design ==
Within arts and humanities departments there are ongoing debates about how to define this emerging research phenomenon, and there are a variety of models of practice research (practice-as-research, practice-based, practice-led, mixed-mode research practice and practice through research), see for example screen media practice research. The potential, nature and scope for this research has been debated from the 1990s. Sir Christopher Frayling in 1993 adapted Herbert Read's model of education through art to describe different ways of thinking about research, noting that research could be for practice, where research aims are subservient to practice aims, through practice, where the practice serves a research purpose, or into practice, such as observing the working processes of others. Bruce Archer's statement in 1995 shows the growing recognition of arts practice as research at this time, "There are circumstances where the best or only way to shed light on a proposition, a principle, a material, a process or a function is to attempt to construct something, or to enact something, calculated to explore, embody or test it." This led to the acceptance of practice research in these disciplines to be reviewed alongside traditional research disciplines in the sphere of Higher Education a debate supported by the work of Michael Biggs, John Freeman, Kristina Niedderer, Katy Macleod, Darren Newbury and others.

The UK's Arts and Humanities Research Council had a steering committee devoted to practice-led research and its report was completed in September 2007, titled AHRC Research Review in Practice-Led Research in Art, Design and Architecture. This informed continuing discussions by the Council for Higher Education in Art & Design (CHEAD) and the AHRC resulting in an evolved notion of practice as research in art, design and architecture, media, and creative writing. This in turn brought an increasing recognition in the UK of the ways in which creative departments contribute to research culture, a potential which informs elements of the Research Excellence Framework 2014.
