= Kalman (disambiguation) =

Kálmán is a Hungarian surname and given name.

Kalman may also refer to:

- 4992 Kálmán, a main belt asteroid
- Kalman decomposition
- Kalman filter
  - Ensemble Kalman filter (EnKF), a recursive filter
  - Extended Kalman filter
  - Fast Kalman filter (FKF)
- Kalman–Yakubovich–Popov lemma
