= Kálmán Kovács =

Kálmán Kovács may refer to:

- Kálmán Kovács (footballer, born 1965), Hungarian football player
- Kálmán Kovács (footballer, born 1912) (1912–1982), Hungarian football player
- Kálmán Kovács (canoeist), Hungarian sprint canoer
