= Calman =

Calman is a surname of English and Scottish origin. Notable people with the surname include:

- Sir Kenneth Calman (1941–2025), Scottish doctor and academic
- Mel Calman (1931–1994), British cartoonist
- Neil Calman, president, CEO, and co-founder of the Institute for Family Health
- Ross Calman (born early 1970s), historian
- Stephanie Calman, British author
- Susan Calman (born 1974), Scottish comedian
- William Thomas Calman (1871–1952), Scottish zoologist

== See also ==
- McCalman, a surname
- Calman Commission and Calman Report, see Commission on Scottish Devolution
- Calman–Hine report
- Çalman, Vezirköprü, a village in Turkey
