= Callmann =

Callmann is a German surname. Notable people with the surname include:

- Moritz Callmann Wahl (1829–1887), German writer
- Rudolf Callmann (1892–1976), German American legal scholar
- Cassandra Callmann (1989 - ), American chemist

== See also ==
- Kallmann (disambiguation)
- Kallman
