= Kallman =

Kallman is a surname of the following people:

- Benjamin Källman (born 1998), Finnish footballer
- Brent Kallman (born 1990), American association football player
- Brian Kallman (born 1984), American association football player, brother of Brent
- Chester Kallman (1921–1975), American poet, librettist and translator
- Craig Kallman, American businessperson and music executive
- Dick Kallman (1933–1980), American actor
- Jonas Källman (born 1981), Swedish handball player
- Kassey Kallman (born 1992), American association football player, sister of Brian and Brent

== See also ==
- Kallman–Rota inequality in mathematics
- Kallmann (disambiguation)
- Callmann
- Kallmann syndrome
- Kalman (disambiguation)
