= Ditha Moser =

Austrian graphic designer (1883–1969)

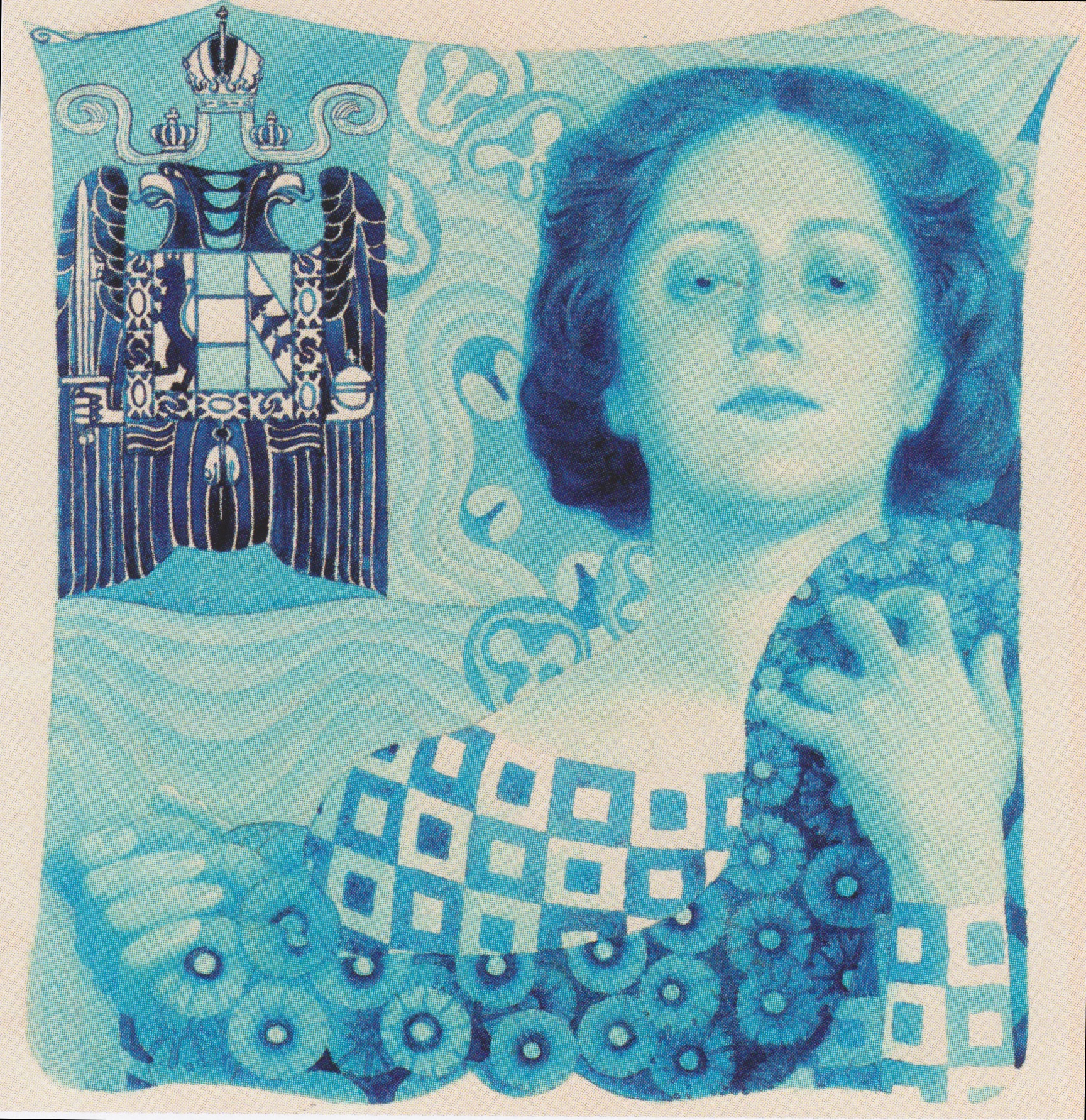
- Edith Moser in a banknote design by Koloman Moser (1910)
- Born: Edith Mautner von Markhof; 1883
- Died: 1969 (aged 85–86)
- Education: Academy for Applied Arts in Vienna
- Style: Jugendstil
- Movement: Vienna Secession
- Spouse: Koloman Moser

Edith "Ditha" Moser (née Mautner von Markhof; 1883–1969) was an Austrian artist and an influential member of the artistic group Vienna Secession.

== Early life ==
Edith "Ditha" Moser was born in 1883 as Edith Mautner von Markhof to a wealthy Austrian industrial family. From 1902 to 1905, she studied at the Academy for Applied Arts in Vienna as a guest student under Josef Hoffmann. In 1905, she married Viennese artist Koloman Moser, and they remained married until his death from cancer in 1918.

== Career ==
Along with her husband, her former professor, and artists such as Gustav Klimt, Moser took part in the Vienna Secession. In the late 1800s, the world saw new artistic trends involving progressive design theory that presented themselves in a variety of movements and styles across countries. As the modern world moved forward, artists desired new ways to both express and withdraw from these changes. In Vienna, which had become a leading city for these new artistic styles, this appeared in the Vienna Secession where many leading artists at the time sought a new place where they could exhibit and explore their work away from the Academy for Fine Arts (eventually building the Secession Building). Artists in the movement wanted to bring artwork back to everyday life and would hand make their work over new manufacturing techniques.

To further their movement, Moser helped her husband found a new group known as the Wiener Werkstätte, literally meaning "Vienna Workshop," where secession artists collaborated on their work. They became popular with wealthy clientele in Vienna who liked their modern objects. However, their attempts to expand the workshop to other cities (such as Zurich, Berlin, and New York City) failed and, after the workshop increasingly lost relevance, it closed down in 1932.

Much of Moser's artworks followed the same themes of the Wiener Werkstätte, focusing on creating her own smaller objects. She began producing work by creating calendars as New Year's gifts for friends. She often included imagery from her family life, as seen in one Tarot card deck where she incorporated likenesses of her own family members to portray a family story where everyone dressed as a different tarot card for a family wedding anniversary. She also displayed a fondness for toy soldiers in her tarot cards, as well as biblical and mythological themes.

She often made her work in the Jugendstil style ('youth style'), which was the German equivalent of Art Nouveau that influenced many members of the Vienna Secession. This is visible in her use of simple forms and straight lines.

Despite her establishment as a graphic designer, her work output was still relatively limited and not many have survived. She stopped producing work entirely after World War I, and died at the age of 86.

== Personal life ==
One year after the death of her first husband, in 1919, she married Adolf Hauska and had new children with him.
