= Practice-based research network =

A practice-based research network (PBRN) is a group of practices devoted principally to the care of patients and affiliated for the purpose of examining the health care processes that occur in practices. PBRNs are characterized by an organizational framework that transcends a single practice or study. They provide a "laboratory" for studying broad populations of patients and care providers in community-based settings.

== History of primary care research ==
Before there were research institutes or networks of practices, individual practitioners studied their patients' problems with scientific rigor. Among these were five general practitioners who have been recognized for their seminal work during the past 125 years. They are James Mackenzie, Will Pickles, John Fry, F.J.A. Huygen and Curtis G. Hames. Each of these pioneers demonstrated that important new knowledge could be discovered by practicing family physicians. More recently, practicing primary care pediatricians such as Burtis Breese and William Carey contributed a body of knowledge on child health. These doctors all wondered about their patients' problems and they developed a means of gathering and recording data on their patients.

Each of these research pioneers provide inspiration for the development of practice-based, primary care research networks because each demonstrated that important new knowledge could be discovered by the practicing primary care physician. They each wondered about their patients, developed means of gathering and recording data, and found collaborators and support from their staff and local communities. Unfortunately, they practiced in an era that was over-committed to specialism. Research focused on molecular mechanisms of disease. The rush to specialization by the medical community and the linking of research to specialists resulted in decades of neglect of primary care and virtually no recognition of the need to investigate care in the primary care setting. Instead, the common wisdom viewed primary care practices as relatively boring places that could be potential sites of application of the fruits of research done elsewhere in research laboratories, hospitals and institutes.

Among the early regional networks started in the 1970s were the Dartmouth CO-OP PBRN in New Hampshire, Family Medicine Information System in Colorado (FMIS) and the Cooperative Information Project. These regional networks learned from each other and succeeded in conducting studies focused on what was happening in primary care. They attracted funding from medical schools, national philanthropic foundations and federal programs such as Health for Underserved Rural Areas. As the 1970s closed, these early networks enjoyed sufficient success to stimulate debate about the next steps in the context of the microcomputer's development. Among them was a small group convened by Gene Farley in Denver in 1978 to consider establishing a national sentinel practice system. It was this idea that lead to the Ambulatory Sentinel Practice Network and provided in retrospect what appears to have been a nidus for the establishment of primary care PBRNs in the United States. In the 1980s, pediatric research networks - the Pediatric Practice Research Group (PPRG) in metropolitan Chicago and the national Pediatric Research in Office Settings (PROS) network of the American Academy of Pediatrics - emerged as well.

PBRNs are feasible and that represent a useful infrastructure for the scientific discovery of family practice and primary care. Experience to date points out the great advantages enjoyed by those with enduring, core financial support—such as the Dutch with their early national commitment to primary care and their willingness to invest in primary care research. It is also obvious that these networks require collaboration, cooperation and a spirit of sharing and trust.

These networks are now at once both a place and a concept. As a place, they are a laboratory for surveillance and research. As a concept, they express the still unmet need for practicing primary care clinicians to accept responsibility to improve frontline clinical care by understanding what is happening in their practices. Successes to date have been sufficient to incite the Institute of Medicine's 1994 committee studying the future of primary care to recommend support to stabilize and expand practice-based primary care research networks.

== Currently active ==
1. AAFP NRN – AAFP National Research Network Kansas
2. AANPNR – American Academy of Nurse Practitioners Network for Research Texas
3. ACCESSPBRN – ACCESSPBRN Illinois
4. ACCP PBRN – American College of Clinical Pharmacy Practice-Based Research Network Kansas
5. ACERN – Ambulatory Care Evaluation and Research Network New York
6. ACORN – Virginia Ambulatory Care Outcomes Research Network Virginia
7. ACPNet – ACPNet Pennsylvania
8. APBRN – Alabama Practice Based Research Network Alabama
9. A-PBRN - Ayurveda Practice Based Research Network United Kingdom
10. APN-ARC – Advanced Practice Nurse-Ambulatory Research Consortium Ohio
11. APPD LEARN – Association of Pediatric Program Directors Longitudinal Educational Assessment Research Network Virginia
12. ARCHNAP St. Louis Ambulatory Care Research Consortium for Nurses in Advanced Practice Missouri
13. AT-PBRN – Athletic Training Practice-Based Research Network Arizona
14. ATSU SOMA PBRN – A.T. Still University School of Osteopathic Medicine in Arizona PBRN Arizona
15. AppNET – The Appalachian Research Network Tennessee
16. ArkPBRN – Arkansas Practice Based Research Network Arkansas
17. BIGHORN – Building Investigative Practices for Better Health Outcomes Colorado
18. BWPC PBRN – Brigham and Women's Primary Care Practice-Based Research Network Massachusetts
19. BraveNet – The Bravewell Integrative Medicine Research Network North Carolina
20. C-AHEAD PBRN – Center for the Advancement of Healthcare Education and Delivery PBRN Colorado
21. CAARN - Community-Academic Aging Research Network (UW-Madison)
22. CAPRICORN – Capital Area Primary Care Research Network District of Columbia
23. CARinG Network – Cincinnati Area Research Group Network Ohio
24. CCPC – Connecticut Center for Primary Care Connecticut
25. CDN – Clinical Directors Network, Inc. New York
26. COCONet – Colorado Child Outcomes Network Colorado
27. CORC – CAMHS Outcomes Research Consortium UK
28. CONCORD-PBRN – Consortium for Collaborative Osteopathic Research Development Practice-Based Research Network Texas
29. CORNET – Continuity Research Network Virginia
30. CPNet – Community Physician's Network Georgia
31. CSPC – Centre for Studies in Primary Care
32. CSRN – CLEAR Scoliosis Research Network Texas
33. CaReNet – Colorado Research Network Colorado
34. Cedars-Sinai PBRN-Cedars-Sinai Medical Delivery Network PBRN California
35. CenTexNet – Central Texas Primary Care Research Network Texas
36. DC PrimCare PBRN – District of Columbia Primary Care Practice-Based Research Network District of Columbia
37. DO-Touch.NET – Doctors of Osteopathic Medicine Treating with OMM: Usefulness in Current Healthcare Missouri
38. DesertNet – DesertNet Arizona Primary Care Research Network Arizona
39. E-CARE – Eastern Carolina Association for Research & Education North Carolina
40. EBD-PBRN – Evidence-Based Decisions in Dentistry Practice-Based Research Network California
41. EPICnet – Eastern Pennsylvania Inquiry Collaborative Network Pennsylvania
42. GR-PBRN – Greater Rochester Practice Research Network New York
43. GRIN – Great Lakes Research Into Practice Network Michigan
44. HCH PBRN – Health Care for the Homeless Practice Based Research Network Tennessee
45. HHR – Holistic Healthcare and Research Centre
46. HPRN – High Plains Research Network Colorado
47. HamesNet – HamesNet Georgia
48. Healthy Communities – Physicians of Southwest Washington Foundation for Quality Improvement Washington
49. ICPA PBRN – International Chiropractic Pediatric Association PBRN Pennsylvania
50. IDND – Indianapolis Discovery Network for Dementia Indiana
51. IFHRN – Institute for Family Health Research Network New York
52. IRENE – Iowa Research Network Iowa
53. ISRN-RN – Improvement Science Research Network Texas
54. JCCCR – Jefferson Coordinating Center for Clinical Research Pennsylvania
55. JDPBRN – Dental PBRN Japan
56. JHCP-PCRN – Johns Hopkins Community Physicians Primary Care Research Network Maryland
57. JaxHERO – Jacksonville Health Equity Research Organization Florida
58. KAN – Kentucky Ambulatory Network Kentucky
59. LA Net – LA Net Community Health Network California
60. LAC DHS ACN-R&I – Los Angeles County Department of Health Services, Ambulatory Care Network – Research & Innovation California
61. La MAISON – Louisiana Medical Home Ambulatory Improvements and Outcomes Network Louisiana
62. Lutheran Network – Lutheran Family Health Center Network New York
63. MAFPRN – Minnesota Academy of Family Physicians Research Network Minnesota
64. MAPPR – Mecklenburg Area Partnership for Primary Care Research North Carolina
65. MASNRN – Massachusetts School Nurse Research Network Massachusetts
66. MCHS PBRN – Mayo Clinic Health System Practice Based Research Network Minnesota
67. MGPC-PBRN – Massachusetts General Primary Care Practice Based Research Network Massachusetts
68. MPCRN – Military Primary Care Research Network Maryland
69. MPPBRN – Minnesota Pharmacy Practice-Based Research Network Minnesota
70. MTN – MO Therapy Network Missouri
71. MedEdNet – Medical Education Research Network Oregon
72. Mercy – Sisters of Mercy Health System Network Missouri
73. MetroNet – Metropolitan Detroit Practice-based Research Network Michigan
74. National Dental PBRN - National Dental Practice-Based Research Network Alabama
75. NC MARCH – North Carolina Multisite Adolescent Research Consortium for Health North Carolina
76. NC-FM-RN – North Carolina Family Medicine Research Network North Carolina
77. NCCHRN – North Carolina Child Health Research Network North Carolina
78. NCnet - Combined PBRNS founded at UNC-Chapel Hill contains NC-FM-RN, NCCHRN, NC MARCH and RCPCrN
79. NECF PBRN – New England Clinicians Forum Practice-Based Research Network Connecticut
80. NNE CO-OP PCBRN- Northern New England CO-OP Practice & Community Based Research Network (formerly known as the Dartmouth CO-OP PBRN)
81. NEON – Northeastern Ohio Network Ohio
82. NFPCRN – North Florida Pediatric Community Research Network Florida
83. NIPC-PBRN – National Interdisciplinary Primary Care PBRN Iowa
84. NJPCRN – New Jersey Primary Care Research Network New Jersey
85. NP-PITTNet – NursePractitioner-PITTNet Pennsylvania
86. NYC RING – New York City Research & Improvement Networking Group New York
87. NYU-HHC CRA – New York University (NYU)-Health and Hospitals Corporation (HHC) Clinical Research Association (CRA) New York
88. National Dental PBRN – The National Dental Practice-Based Research Network Alabama
89. NetHaven at Yale – NetHaven Practice Based Research Network Connecticut
90. NorTex – North Texas Primary Care Practice Based Research Network Texas
91. NorthShore PBRN – NorthShore Practice-Based Improvement Research Network Illinois
92. Northwest PRECEDENT – Northwest Practice-based REsearch Collaborative in Evidence-based DENTistry Washington
93. OCHRN – Oklahoma Child Health Practice Based Research Network Oklahoma
94. OKPRN – Oklahoma Physicians Resource/Research Network Oklahoma
95. ORPRN – Oregon Rural Practice-based Research Network Oregon
96. OPTI-WestNet – OPTI-West Practice-Based Research Network Colorado
97. OQUIN – Outpatient Quality Improvement Network South Carolina
98. OSU-PCPBRN – Ohio State University Primary Care Practice Based Research Network Ohio
99. PAMFRI – Palo Alto Medical Foundation Research Institute California
100. PBRN-VA – VA Mental Health Practice-Based Research Network Texas
101. PCRC – Duke Primary Care Research Consortium North Carolina
102. PDC PBRN – Pediatric Diagnostic Center PBRN California
103. PPOC – The Pediatric Physicians' Organization at Children's Massachusetts
104. PRN – Portland Research Network Oregon
105. PROS – Pediatric Research in Office Settings Illinois
106. PSARN – Penn State Ambulatory Research Network Pennsylvania
107. PeRC – The Pediatric Research Consortium Pennsylvania
108. Pediatric PittNet – Pediatric PittNet: University of Pittsburgh CTSI PBRN Pennsylvania
109. RAP – Research Association of Practices of the PBRN Shared Resource Ohio
110. RCPCrN – Robeson County Primary Care research Network North Carolina
111. REACH Network – Research and Education for Academic Achievement Network Illinois
112. RIOS NET – Research Involving Outpatient Settings Network New Mexico
113. Rx-SafeNet – Medication Safety Research Network of Indiana Indiana
114. SAFTINet – Scalable Architecture for Federated Translational Inquiries Network Colorado
115. SALT-Net – The Studying, Acting, Learning, and Teaching Network New York
116. SAPPHIRE – South Asian Practice Partnership for Health Improvement and Research New York
117. SCOR Network – Slone Center Office-based Research Network Massachusetts
118. SCPPRN – South Carolina Pediatric Practice Research Network South Carolina
119. SERCN – Southeast Regional Clinicians Network Georgia
120. SF Bay CRN – San Francisco Bay Collaborative Research Network California
121. SICTRN – Southeastern Integrated Clinical and Translational Research Network Florida
122. SIPRO – Southern Illinois Practice Research Organization Illinois
123. SOAR-Net – Southwestern Ohio Ambulatory Research Network Ohio
124. SPUR-Net – Southern Primary-care Urban Research Network Texas
125. SRN – ShowMe Research Network Missouri
126. STARNet – South Texas Ambulatory Research Network Texas
127. STOHN – South Texas Oral Health Network Texas
128. STP PBRN – South Texas Psychiatric Practice-Based Research Network Texas
129. SWIRLNet – South West Innovative Research and Learning Network Colorado
130. Safety Net West – Safety Net West Oregon
131. South Asian PBRN – South Asian PBRN
132. Southeast Wisconsin Alliance for Translating Research into Practice – Southeast Wisconsin Alliance for Translating Research into Practice Wisconsin
133. TAMHSC-RCHI – Texas A&M Health Science Center Rural and Community Health Institute Texas
134. UCLA PCRN – UCLA Primary Care Research Network California
135. UMASS-FM-PBRN – UMass Family Medicine PBRN Massachusetts
136. UNYNET – Upstate New York Practice Based Research Network New York
137. UT Pharm Net – University of Tennessee Pharmacist Practice Based Research Network Tennessee
138. UUPCRN – Utah Health Research Network Utah
139. VCMCDDCP – Ventura County Medical Center Diabetes Data Control Project Practice Based California
140. WPRN – WWAMI Region Practice and Research Network Washington
141. WREN – Wisconsin Research and Education Network Wisconsin
142. WU PAARC – Washington University Pediatric and Adolescent Ambulatory Research Consortium Missouri
143. WesTRN – West Texas Research Network Texas
