= McCalman =

McCalman is a surname. Notable people with the surname include:

- Ben McCalman (born 1988), Australian rugby union player
- Don McCalman (1935–2017), Scottish football player and manager
- Iain McCalman (born 1947), Australian academic and historian
- James T. McCalman (1914–1977), American politician
- Janet McCalman (born 1947), Australian social historian
- Macon McCalman (1932–2005), American actor

== See also ==
- Calman, surname
- The McCalmans, a Scottish folk music group
- McCalman Peak, a mountain in Antarctica
