= Koloman (given name) =

Koloman is a masculine given name used in Central Europe. It has unknown origin. It may be derived from a Turkish word for 'remainder', from a Celtic word for 'hermit', or from the given name Kolumbín. Notable people with the name include:

- Koloman Bedeković, Croatian politician
- Koloman Brenner, Hungarian politician
- Koloman Gögh (1948–1995), Czechoslovak footballer
- Koloman Moser (1868–1918), Austrian artist
- Koloman von Pataky, Hungarian opera singer
- Koloman Sokol, Slovak painter
- Koloman Sović (1899–1971), Croatian cyclist
- Koloman Wallisch, Austrian socialist

== See also ==
- Coloman
