= Kálmán Menyhárt =

Hungarian footballer (born 1955)

Kalman Menyhart
Personal information
- Date of birth: 15 July 1955 (age 71)
- Place of birth: Budapest, Hungary
- Height: 1.82 m (6 ft 0 in)
- Position: Goalkeeper

Youth career
- 1968–1973: Csepel F.C.
- Budapest Honvéd FC

Senior career*
Years	Team	Apps	(Gls)
1973–1975	Csepel F.C.	0	(0)
1975–1977	Kossuth KFSE	34	(0)
1977–1979	Csepel F.C.	16	(0)
1979–1985	Honvéd Budapest	30	(0)
1985–1986	Szazhalombatta	23	(0)
1986–1987	Komloi Banyasz	31	(0)
1987–1988	MTK Budapest F.C.	0	(0)
1988–1992	Royal Francs Borains	68	(0)

Managerial career
- 1992–1994: Aulnoi
- 1996–1997: VSE St. Polten
- * Club domestic league appearances and goals

Kalman Menyhart (born 15 July 1955) is a Hungarian football manager and a former player who played as a goalkeeper.

== Career ==
Menyhart was born in Budapest. He was the goalkeeper with whom, on 24 May 1980, the Honvéd Budapest F.C won again the Hungarian Championship since 1955. On this day, the Honvéd Budapest F.C. defeated the team of Szekesfehervari MAV Elore (2–0). #1 Menyhart, #2 Paroczai, #3 Kocsis, #4 Varga, #5 Nagy, #6 Garaba, #10 Gyimesi, #9 Weimper, #7 Bodonyi, #8 Dajka, #16 Esterhazy, and #11 Kozma was the team composition and Lajos Tichy was the coach.

In January 1983, his arm was broken while playing an exhibition game against Hertha BSC in the Olympic Stadium of Berlin. Due to this unfortunate injury, he wasn't able to play for the Hungary national team. He was unable to play for over 300 games and had to sit on the bench until his injury was completely healed.

At age 33, he left Hungary to play in Belgium, became Belgian Citizen, and acquired the Coach - Assistant Coach - Youth Soccer Coach Diplomas from the Federal School of Belgian Royal Union of Football Association.

== Honours ==
- Budapest Honvéd FC
  - Hungarian League: 1980, 1984, 1985
  - Hungarian Cup: 1985
