= Koloman (restaurant) =

Restaurant in New York City, U.S.

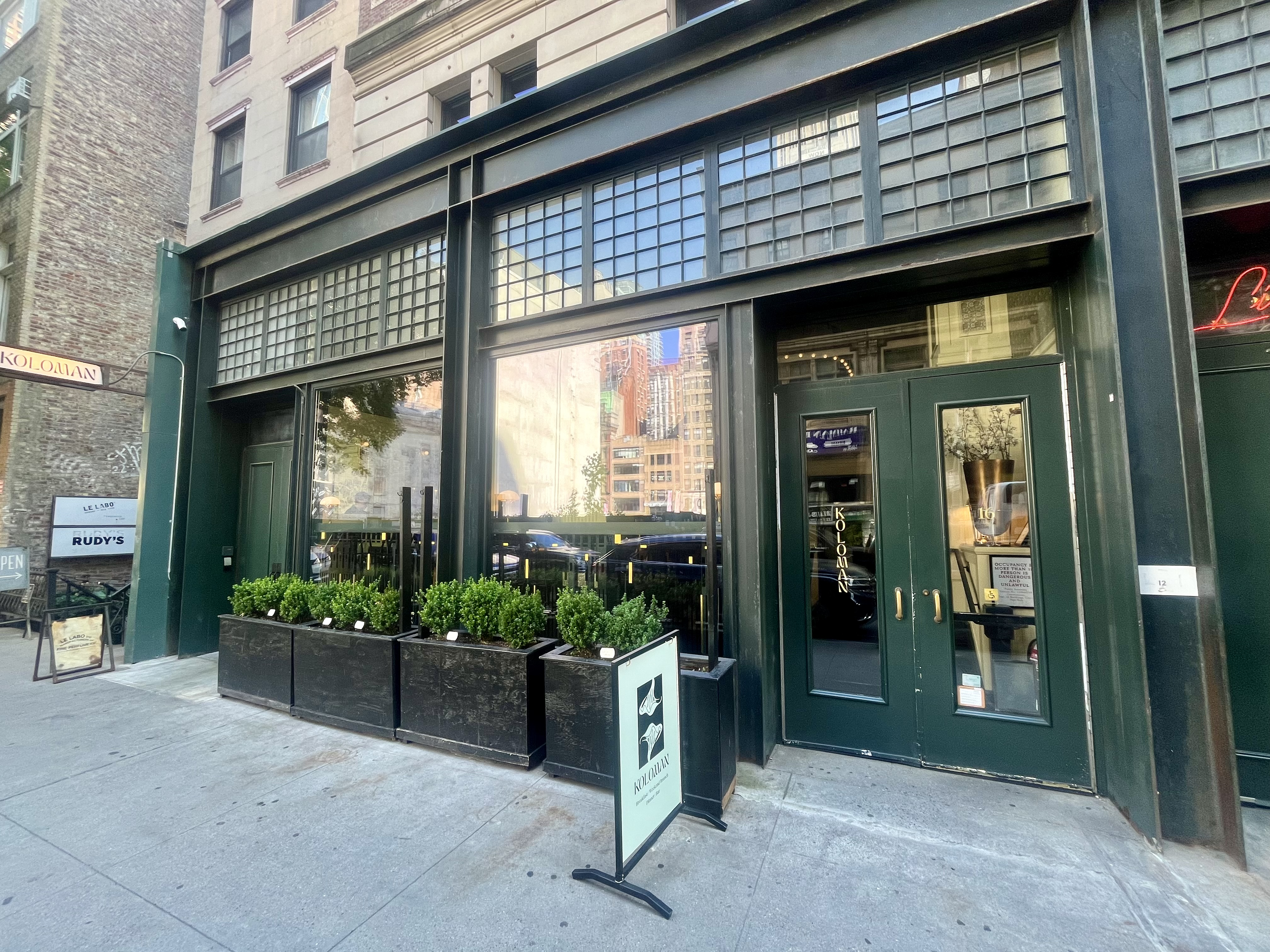
- The restaurant's exterior in 2024
- Interactive map of Koloman

Restaurant information
- Established: September 15, 2022
- Location: 16 West 29th Street, New York City, New York, 10001, United States
- Coordinates: 40°44′44″N 73°59′17″W
- Website: kolomanrestaurant.com

Koloman is a restaurant in New York City.
