= Moritz Callmann Wahl =

Moritz Callmann Wahl (March 28, 1829 – October 15, 1887) was a German writer.

== Biography ==
He was born in Sondershausen, Germany on March 28, 1829. He studied Oriental languages at Leipzig under Julius Fürst and Heinrich Leberecht Fleischer. Later he taught for a time at an English school, and later was a correspondent in a business house at Lyon, France. He settled at Erfurt, Germany, where he founded a business academy. Aside from his teaching activity he pursued scientific studies. He died on October 15, 1887.

== Publications ==
- Beiträge zur Vergleichenden Parömiologie
- Das Sprichwort in der Hebräisch-Aramäischen Literatur
- The Book of Merry Riddles
- Das Sprichwort der Neueren Sprachen
- Die Englische Parömiologie vor Shakespeare
- Das Parömiologische Sprachgut bei Shakespeare
