= Kallmann =

Kallmann is a German surname that may refer to

- Franz Josef Kallmann (1897–1965), German-born American psychiatrist
  - Kallmann syndrome
- Gerhard Kallmann (1915–2012), German-born American architect and academic
  - Kallmann McKinnell & Wood, an architectural design firm based in Boston, United States
- Hans Jürgen Kallmann (1908–1991), German artist
- Hartmut Kallmann (1896–1978), German physicist
- Helmut Kallmann (1922–2012), Canadian musicologist and librarian

== See also ==
- Kallman
- Callmann
