= Neil Calman =

American physician

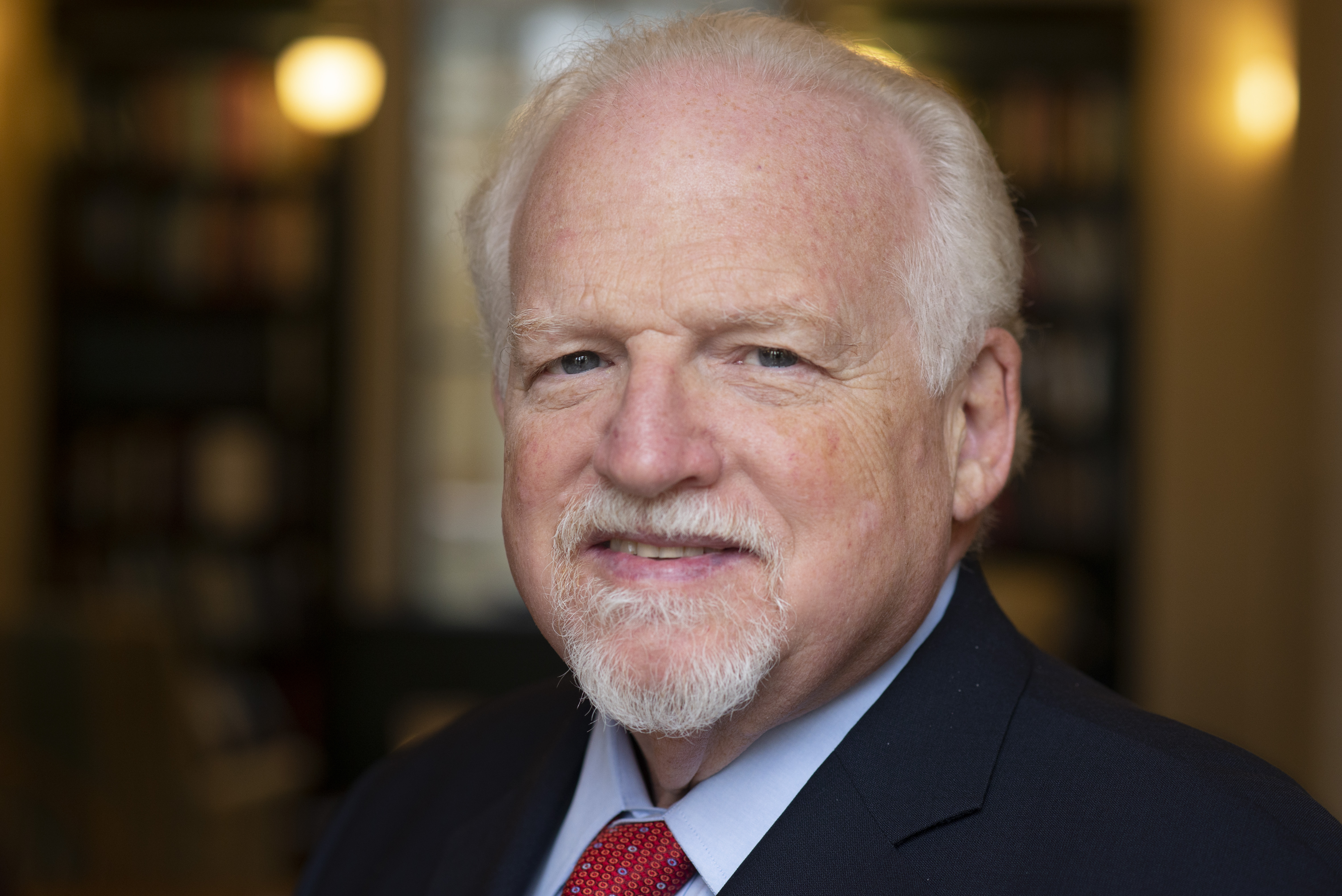
- Neil Calman in 2018
- Education: Montefiore Residency Program in Social Medicine, University of Medicine and Dentistry of New Jersey, University of Chicago
- Occupations: President and Chief Executive Officer of the Institute for Family Health
- Medical career
- Field: Family Medicine, Primary Care, Health equity
- Institutions: Institute for Family Health, Icahn School of Medicine at Mount Sinai
- Website: Neil S. Calman, MD

Neil S. Calman is a family physician and the president, CEO, and co-founder of the Institute for Family Health. He is the chairman of the Department of Family Medicine & Community Health at the Icahn School of Medicine at Mount Sinai and the board chair of the Community Health Care Association of New York State.

== Biography ==
Calman was born in New York. He graduated from University of Chicago in 1971 and from the University of Medicine and Dentistry of New Jersey at Rutgers University with a MMS in 1973 and from Rush University with a MD in 1975. Calman spent two months pre-residency volunteering at a clinic in Delano, California with the United Farm Workers Union. He completed residency at Montefiore Medical Center with the Montefiore Residency Program in Social Medicine in the Bronx, NY. Calman was inspired by his grandfather, an attorney, oral surgeon, and socialist alderman in New York City, who fought for a number of social justice issues.

Calman co-founded the Institute for Family Health, a FQHC in 1983 where he has served since its inception as the president and CEO. In 2012 with Mount Sinai Hospital, Calman co-founded the Department of Family Medicine and Community Health at the Icahn School of Medicine at Mount Sinai, the first department of family medicine in Manhattan, where he serves as a professor and chair of the department. Calman is the president of the American Association of Teaching Health Centers and the Board Chair of the Community Health Care Association of New York State. Calman was elected to the National Academy of Medicine and the New York Academy of Medicine

=== Family medicine ===
Calman was trained in family medicine and has been recognized as New York Metro Area's Top Doctor from 2002-2014. He has been profiled in books on family medicine physicians. Calman started three family medicine residency programs at the Institute for Family Health; two in New York City and one in the mid-Hudson Valley.

=== Health disparities ===
Calman is committed to eliminating structural racism and examining the ways health care remains segregated. He is the Principal Investigator for Bronx Health REACH, a Centers for Disease Control and Prevention-funded community coalition addressing racial and ethnic disparities in health outcomes, since their formation in 1999. His article “Out of the Shadows” discusses his experience in dealing with racism in the care of his patients. Calman was appointed to the HIT Policy Committee serving on the Meaningful Use Subcommittee by the Obama administration responsible for establishing recommendations for the deployment of Health IT in practices and hospitals nationwide. Calman is sourced in media including The New York Times and television news networks to discuss health care delivery and health disparities.

== Appointments ==
- Board of Health Care Services, National Academy of Medicine
- Board Chair, Community Health Care Association of New York State
- 2009-2014 HIT Policy Committee, Office of the National Coordinator of Health Information Technology, Health and Human Services
- 1993-2014 New York State Council on Graduate Medical Education

== Awards and honors ==
- 2016 Lewis and Jack Rudin Prize for Medicine and Health –New York Academy of Medicine
- 2014 Primary Care Excellence Award – Primary Care Development Corporation
- 2011 Distinguished Alumni Award – Rutgers Robert Wood Johnson Medical School
- 2010 Max Cheplove Award – New York State Academy of Family Physicians, Erie County
- 2009 Felix A Fishman Award – New York Lawyers for the Public Interest
- 2009 Joseph H Kanter Prize for Work to Eliminate Disparities in Health Care
- 2008 Physician Advocacy Award – Institute on Medicine as a Profession
- 2006 HIMSS National Physician Information Technology Leadership Award –Healthcare Information and Management Systems Society (HIMSS)
- 2004 Community Service Award – New York Association of Community Health Workers
- 1994 Primary Care Achievement Award – Pew Charitable Trusts/ US Public Health Service
- 1993 Community Health Leadership Award – Robert Wood Johnson Foundation

== Publications ==
=== Research ===
Partial list:

- Electronic Health Records: Optimizing Communication to Support the Nonverbal Medical Patient With Developmental Disabilities. Calman N, Little V, Garozzo S. Prog Community Health Partnersh. 2015 Winter;9(4):591-4. doi:10.1353/cpr.2015.0070 PMID 26639385
- Electronic access to adolescents' health records: legal, policy, and practice implications. Calman N, Pfister HR, Lesnewski R, Hauser D, Shroff N. Fam Pract Manag. 2015 Mar-Apr;22(2):11-4. PMID 25884967
- Becoming a Patient-Centered Medical Home: A 9-Year Transition for a Network of Federally Qualified Health Centers. Calman NS, Hauser D, Weiss L, Waltermaurer E, Molina-Ortiz E, Chantarat T, Bozack A. Annals of Family Medicine 2013;11:S68- doi:10.1370/afm.1547 PMID 23690389
- Strengthening public health and primary care collaboration through electronic health records. Calman N, Hauser D, Lurio J, Wu WY, Pichardo M. American Journal of Public Health. 2012 Nov;102(11):e13-8. doi:10.2105/AJPH.2012.301000 PMID 22994274
- Primary care and health reform. Calman NS, Golub M, Shuman S. Mount Sinai Journal of Medicine. 2012 Sep-Oct;79(5):527-34. doi:10.1002/msj.21335 PMID 22976358
- A community mobilizes to end medical apartheid. Golub M, Calman N, Ruddock C, Agarwal N, Davis JH, Foley RL, Purcaro E, Backer BA, Devia C, Linnell J, Mathur R, Sachdev N. Progress in Community Health Partnerships. 2011 Fall;5(3):317-25. doi:10.1353/cpr.2011.0041 PMID 22080781
- Using Health Information Technology to Improve Health Quality and Safety in Community Health Centers. Calman NS, Kitson K, Hauser D. Journal of Progress in Community Health Partnerships: Research Education and Action. Spring 2007; 1(1):83-88. doi:10.1353/cpr.2011.0041 PMID 22080781
- The Action Committee of the Bronx Health REACH Coalition. Separate and Unequal Care in New York City. Calman NS, Golub M, Ruddock C, Le L, Hauser D. Journal of Health Care Law & Policy. 2006; 9(1):105-120. PMID 17165226
- The Computerized Family Problem Profile. Calman NS, Harvey M, Shah R. Family Practice Research Journal. Fall 1982; 2:3.

=== Published essays ===
- “Lost to Follow-Up” – The Public Health Goals of Accountable Care. Calman NS, Hauser D, Chokshi, DA. Archives of Internal Medicine. 2012 Apr 9;172(7):584-6 doi:10.1001/archinternmed.2012.219 PMID 22493465
- Making Health Equality a Reality: The Bronx Takes Action. Calman NS. Health Affairs. 2005 March/April; 24(2):491-498. doi:10.1377/hlthaff.24.2.491 PMID 15757935
- So Tired of Life. Calman NS. Health Affairs. 2004 May/June; 23:228-232. PMID 15160821
- No One Needs to Know. Calman NS. Health Affairs. 2001 March/April; 20(2):243. doi:10.1377/hlthaff.20.2.243 PMID 11260950
- Out of the Shadow. Calman NS. Health Affairs. Jan/Feb 2000; 19(1):170. PMID 10645084
