= Kálmán Ferenczfalvi =

Kálmán Ferenczfalvi (15 March 1921, Debrecen, Hungary – 8 April 2005, Debrecen) was a Hungarian humanitarian, named as one of the Righteous Among the Nations after World War II.

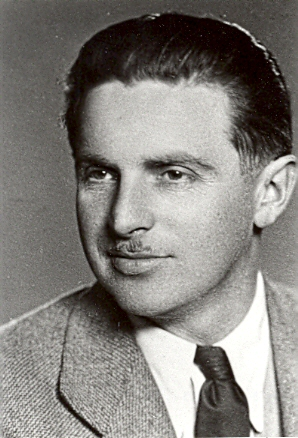
Young Kálmán Ferenczfalvi, 1946

== Holocaust ==
Ferenczfalvi is credited with having saved the lives of more than 2000 people*. A Hungarian Army Supply Officer, he created a phantom unit and in falsifying military documents, payroll books, food ration cards and bilingual open orders in order to rescue Jews and forced laborers*. He also smuggled people under blankets of his horse-drawn wagon out of deportation camps and ghettos. By taking in the first Jewish family into his parents' home, he endangered not only himself, but also his own family*.

After World War II, Ferenczfalvi was a bookkeeper for various state companies and kept silent for decades about his actions during the war. Through a chance “discovery” a forced laborer, who himself was rescued by Ferenczfalvi, made Ferenczfalvi's heroism known. Shortly thereafter numerous people from Europe, America and Australia came forward to bear witness to the rescue actions*.

Ferenczfalvi was honored on 2 June 1988 in Jerusalem by the Yad Vashem Institute with the title Righteous Among the Nations and an olive tree was planted in his honor in Remembrance Park of the Yad Vashem Martyrs' and Heroes' Remembrance Authority.

== Sources ==
- * Yad Vashem Archives, Jerusalem, Hungary No. 3741
- Horváth, László: A gyöngyösi zsidóság története, Mátra Múzeum Gyöngyös, 1999, p. 79 (in Hungarian)
- Szita, Szabolcs: A zsidók üldöztetése Budapesten 1944–1945. In: Holocaust Füzetek, Published 1994/4. Magyar Auschwitz Alapítvány - Holocaust Dokumentációs Központ, Budapest, 1994, p. 54, (in Hungarian)
