= Kálmán Kovács (footballer, born 1912) =

Hungarian footballer (1911–1982)

Personal information
- Nationality: Hungarian
- Born: 30 April 1912
- Died: August 1982 (aged 70)

Sport
- Sport: Football
- Club: Szegedi Kolozsvári Egyetemi AC

Kálmán Kovács (30 April 1912 – August 1982) was a Hungarian international football player. He played for the club Szegedi Kolozsvári Egyetemi AC. He participated with the Hungary national football team at the 1936 Summer Olympics in Berlin.
