= Institute for Family Health =

Health organization in New York State

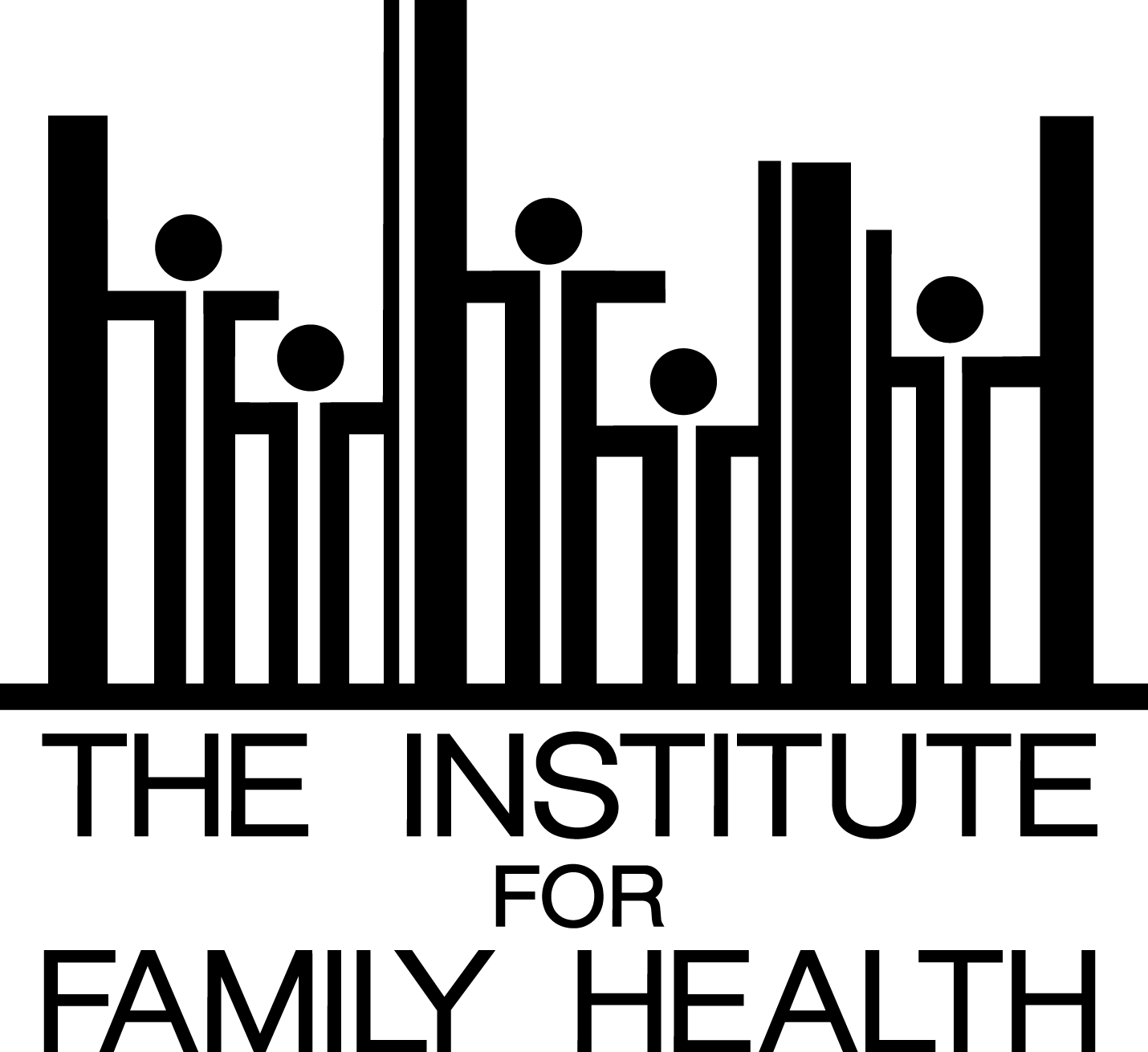
- Formation: 1983
- Type: Not-for-profit
- Purpose: Family health
- Region served: New York State
- Services: Primary care, mental health, dental care, and social work
- President/CEO: Neil Calman
- Affiliations: New York Institute of Technology College of Osteopathic Medicine

The Institute for Family Health is a not-for-profit health organization. Founded in 1983, the institute is one of the largest community health centers in New York State. It serves over 85,000 patients annually at 31 locations in the Bronx, Manhattan and the mid-Hudson Valley. The institute is a federally qualified health center (FQHC) network. Like all Community Health Centers, the Institute accepts all patients regardless of their ability to pay and is governed by a board that has a majority of health center patients. The institute offers primary care, mental health, dental care, and social work, among other services. The institute is accredited by the Joint Commission and recognized by the National Committee for Quality Assurance as a Level 3 patient-centered medical home. The institute also leads programs and conducts research to address racial and ethnic disparities in health, advance the use of health information technology, and improve care for diabetes, depression, women's health, and HIV. The Institute trains health students and professionals at all levels, including the operation of three family medicine residency programs: the Icahn School of Medicine at Mount Sinai Program (Downtown Residency in Urban Family Medicine), the Mid-Hudson Residency in Family Practice and the Harlem Residency in Family Medicine. It is also a major regional clinical campus for clinical rotations affiliated with the New York Institute of Technology College of Osteopathic Medicine.

== History ==
The institute was founded in 1984 by an interdisciplinary group comprising two family physicians, a family nurse practitioner and a behavioral scientist (Neil Calman, James J. Deary III, Yvonne Eisner, and Eric Walsh). Since its inception, the organization has been led by Neil Calman, MD, President and CEO. The Institute began as a small private non-profit that received federal funds to open a Faculty Development Program in Urban Primary Care, which it ran for twenty years. In 1985, it contracted with Bronx-Lebanon Hospital to re-organize its outpatient department into a family practice center, and initiated its first residency training program in family medicine. It worked with Bronx Lebanon until 1999, and jointly developed several small community-based medical practices.

In 1986, the Institute acquired the Sidney Hillman Health Center in Union Square from the Amalgamated Clothing Workers Union and turned the-multi-specialty practice into a family practice. In 1994, the Institute developed a relationship with Beth Israel Medical Center, and began the Beth Israel Residency in Urban Family Practice, opening the Phillips Family Practice to serve as the ambulatory care training site for those residents. Simultaneously, the institute was building and opening a series of small family practice sites. Between 1991 through 1998, the Institute opened the Parkchester Family Practice, Walton Family Health Center, Urban Horizons Family Health Center, East 13th Street Family Practice, and the Mount Hope Family Practice. In 1999, the Institute received an award from the Centers for Disease Control to initiate Bronx Health REACH, a consortium of community and faith based organizations committed to the elimination of racial disparities in health in the South Bronx. The group addresses issues related to nutrition and fitness education; access to healthy foods and safe places to exercise; diabetes maintenance and prevention; school food and exercise programs; and the segregation of health care in academic medical centers. In 2007, the institute was named a Center of Excellence in the Elimination of Disparities. In 2000, the Institute implemented a system-wide electronic health record and practice management system, Epic. The system has altered the way care is delivered by allowing for increased care coordination and preventive care. The EHR also enables research in health processes and outcomes, and has permitted the institute to participate in a number of federal and state payment initiatives such as Primary Care Medical Homes and achieve Meaningful Use designation.

In 2006, the Institute assumed responsibility for three practices operated by St. Christopher's, Inc. As a result, it obtained Article 31 licensure to operate two community mental health programs in the Bronx. A year later, the Institute acquired six health centers and the Mid Hudson Family Practice Residency Program in the Mid-Hudson Valley, which doubled the organizational budget, the number of staff, and the number of patients served. In 2010, when North General Hospital in East Harlem closed, the Institute opened a community health center on the first floor of the former hospital. Two years later, the Institute moved this practice to the newly built Family Health Center of Harlem, two blocks away, which serves as the home of its third residency program, the Harlem Residency in Family Medicine. In 2012, the Institute opened the Stevenson Family Health Center in the Soundview section of the Bronx, preserving access to care as well as jobs in this underserved and geographically isolated community.

== Current Activities ==
=== Mission ===
The mission of the Institute for Family Health is to "improve access to high quality, patient-centered primary health care targeted to the needs of medically underserved communities."

=== Health Services ===
The Institute accepts most private insurance plans, Medicare, Medicaid and patients without insurance. Services provided by the Institute for Family Health include: primary care, sexual and reproductive health, behavioral health, dental care, women's health, prenatal care and delivery, health care for teens, diabetes care, HIV care, some specialty care, home visit services, WIC, Veterans services, free clinics, homeless health care, school-based health care, insurance enrollment, and social services.

Patients can obtain a wide variety of free or low-cost sexual and reproductive health services at all Institute sites. Services include:

· Birth control, including same-day intrauterine device (IUD) and implant insertion, to help patients plan and space births and to prevent unintended pregnancies

· Pregnancy testing and options counseling

· Help for patients who want to conceive

· Preconception counseling to improve infant and maternal health outcomes, and to improve overall patient health

· Gynecological care, including breast and pelvic exams, PAP tests, and internal exams

· Sexually transmitted infection (STI) and HIV prevention education, counseling, and testing

· Prenatal care (including CenteringPregnancy™ groups)

· Specialized care for people with HIV/AIDS

The Institute for Family Health offers contraceptive counseling in a supportive, non-judgemental environment with up-to-date and medically accurate information about all birth control options. Our team can help all patients choose a birth control method most appropriate for their needs and preferences. The institute offers the following birth control options at low or no cost:

· Same-day IUD insertion and removal (non-hormonal and hormonal types)

· Same-day implant insertion and removal

· Hormonal birth control (the pill, patch, ring, depo shot)

· Condoms

· Emergency contraception (i.e., Plan B or ella)

=== Locations ===
The Institute for Family Health 31 health centers located in the Bronx, Manhattan, Brooklyn, and the Mid Hudson Valley.

== Recognition ==
Over the years, the institute has garnered a number of awards for their work, including the RWJ Community Health Leadership Award; the Pew Charitable Trust Primary Care Achievement Award; the American Academy of Family Physicians Public Health Award; the Physician's IT Leadership Award and Davies Public Health Award from the Health Information Management System Society; the CDC Center of Excellence in Public Health Informatics with the New York City Department of Health and Mental Hygiene and Columbia University; the National Physician Advocacy Merit Award from the Institute on Medicine as a Profession; the New York Times Nonprofit Excellence Awards; the Kanter Prize for the elimination of disparities; and the Felix A. Fishman Award for Extraordinary Advocacy.
