= Koloman Moser =

Austrian artist and designer (1868–1918)

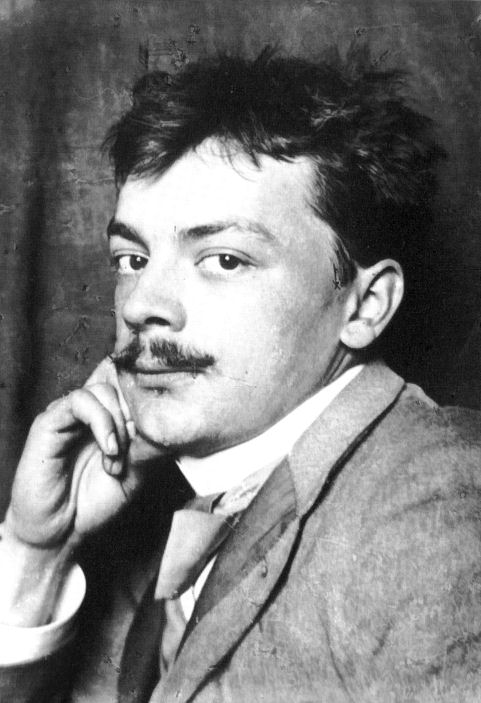
- Photograph of Koloman Moser (1905)
- Born: 30 March 1868; Vienna, Austria-Hungary
- Died: 18 October 1918 (aged 50); Vienna, Austria-Hungary
- Education: 1885–1892 Academy of Fine Arts Vienna; 1893–1895 Vienna School of Applied Arts (Kunstgewerbeschule)
- Known for: Painting, Drawing, Postage Stamp, Printmaking, Ceramics, Stained glass
- Notable work: founder of the Wiener Werkstätte, Stained glass of Kirche am Steinhof
- Movement: Vienna Secession, Jugendstil

Koloman Moser (German: [ˈkoːloman ˈmoːzɐ]; 30 March 1868 – 18 October 1918) was an Austrian artist, who exerted considerable influence on twentieth-century graphic art. He was one of the foremost artists of the Vienna Secession movement and a co-founder of Wiener Werkstätte.

Moser designed a wide array of art works, including books and graphic works from postage stamps to magazine vignettes; fashion; stained glass windows, porcelains and ceramics, blown glass, tableware, silver, jewellery, and furniture.

== Career ==
Moser was born in Vienna in 1868 to parents Josef and Thresia Moser (née Hirsch); he was the oldest of three siblings. He studied at the Academy of Fine Arts Vienna and the Kunstgewerbeschule (School of Applied Arts), where he also taught from 1899.

Moser's designs in architecture, furniture, jewellery, graphics, and tapestries helped characterise the work of this era. He drew upon the clean lines and repetitive motifs of classical Greek and Roman art and architecture in reaction to the Baroque decadence of his turn-of-the-century Viennese surroundings. Between 1900 and 1902, he published with Martin Gerlach and Carl Otto Czeschka a three volume portfolio titled Die Quelle ("The Source") of elegant graphic designs for such things as tapestries, fabrics, and wallpaper.

In 1903, Moser and his colleague Josef Hoffmann founded Wiener Werkstätte(Vienna Workshops), whose studios and artisans produced a number of aesthetically and functionally designed household goods, including glassware, flatware, silverware, rugs, textiles, and graphic designs as well as eventually clothing. Vienna Workshops would become the new commercial standard for Vienna art during the period of the succession. The company saw early success thanks to an organized exhibit of some of their artistic home furnishings by ten of Moser and Hoffmans students (Five women and five men) called "Wiener Kunst im Hause," (Viennese Art in the Home) in the two years before its official establishment. The exhibit was presented at both the Paris exhibition of 1900 and the Vienna secession exhibition of 1902 being met with critical praise for the practicality and affordability of the works and the female creativity in some of the works. His sketches and preparatory drawings for fabrication have been archived. He became recognized in Vienna as influential applied artist capable of two-dimensional and three dimensional design.

In 1904, he created the Apse mosaic and glass windows for the Kirche am Steinhof in Vienna, and designed the decoration of the Medallion House of the Linke Wienzeile Buildings for architect Otto Wagner. In 1905, together with the Klimt group, he separated from the Vienna Secession. The same year, he married Editha (Ditha) Mautner von Markhof, an artist in her own right as well as the daughter to one of Austria's great industry fortunes. Due to internal conflicts and as his plans for reorganising the Werkstätte (to cope with financial problems) weren't realised, Moser withdrew from the Wiener Werkstätte in 1907.

Moser became ill with throat cancer in 1916. Correspondence with Alfred Roller detailed Moser's despair over who would succeed to his position at the University of Applied Arts Vienna. Moser died on 18 October 1918; he was buried three days later in the Hietzing Cemetery.

== Legacy ==
Moser was the lead designer for Austria's leading art journal Ver Sacrum (‘Sacred Spring’ in Latin), the official magazine of the Vienna Secession from 1898 to 1903. This art journal paid great attention to art and design and was managed mainly by Moser, Gustav Klimt and Josef Hoffmann.

One of Moser's most prominent designs used in a building (The Steinhof Church) was selected as a main motif of one of the most famous euro collectors coins: the Austrian 100 euro Steinhof Church commemorative coin, minted on 9 November 2005. On the reverse of the coin, the Koloman Moser stained glass window over the main entrance can be seen. In the centre of the window is God the Father seated on a throne. The window is flanked with a pair of bronze angels in Jugendstil style, originally designed by Othmar Schimkowitz.

To commemorate the centennial of his death, the Museum of Applied Arts Vienna (MAK) honoured Moser with one of the most comprehensive solo shows to date (19 December 2018–22 April 2019).

== Gallery ==
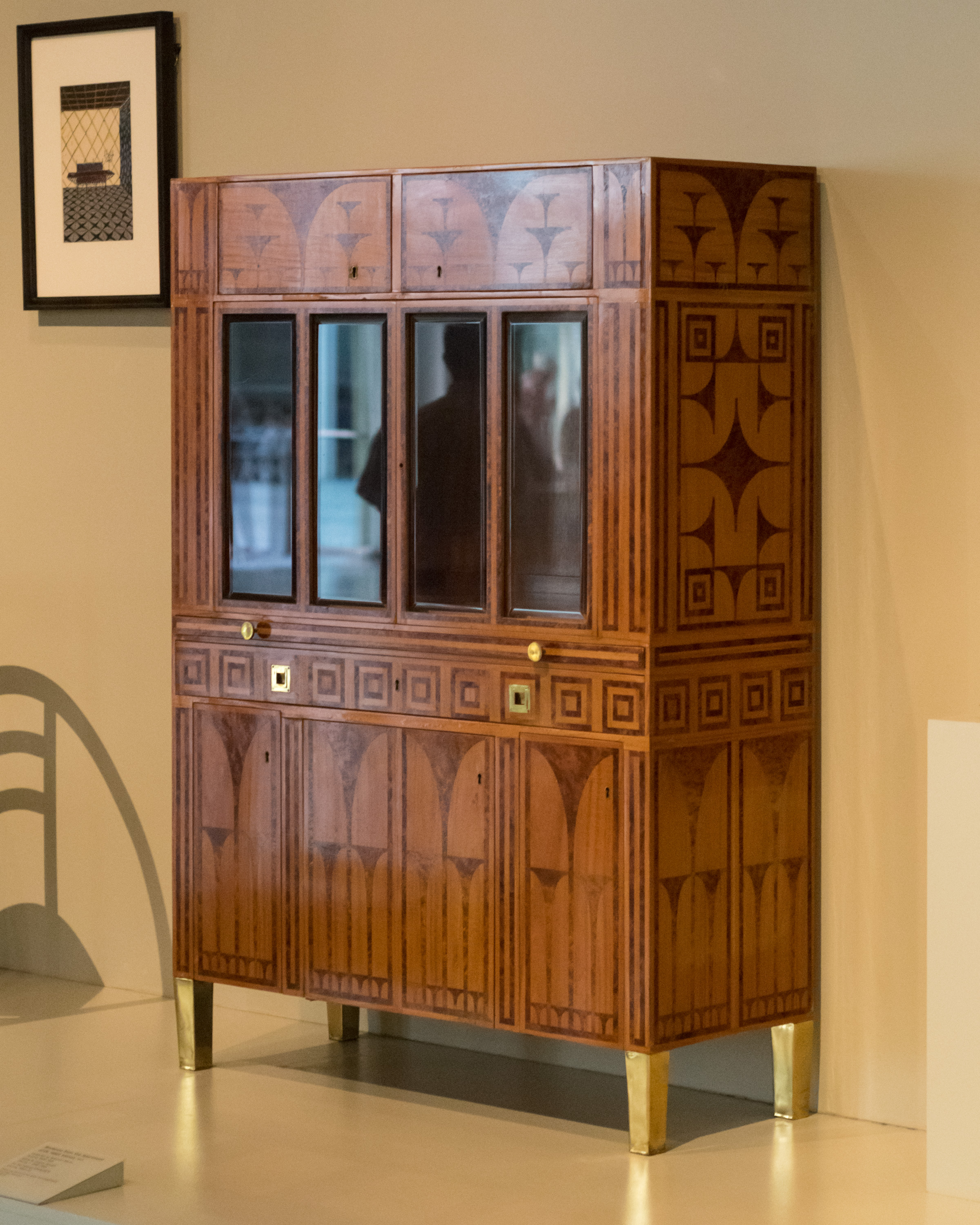
Bookcase

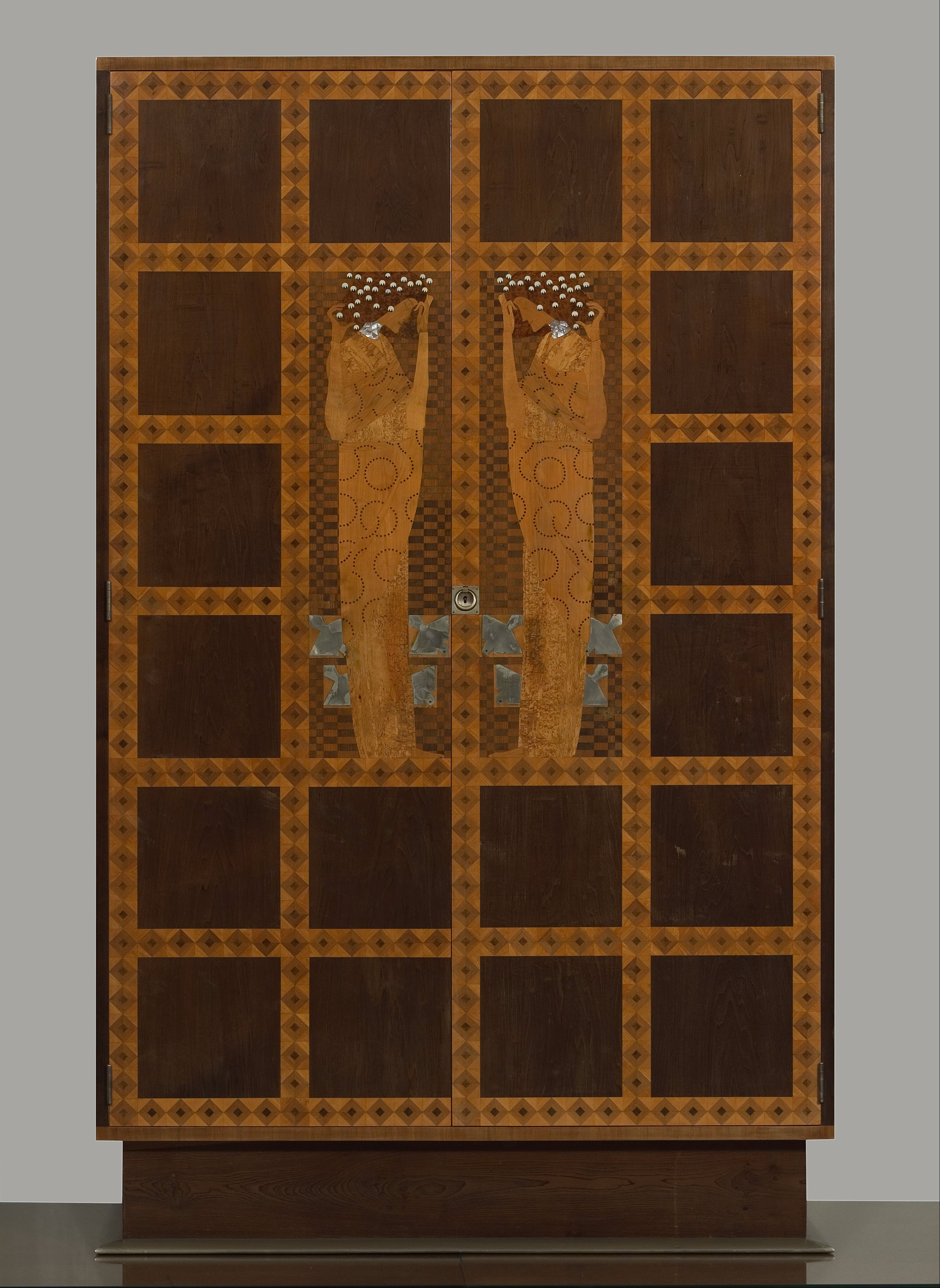
Inlaid Armorie

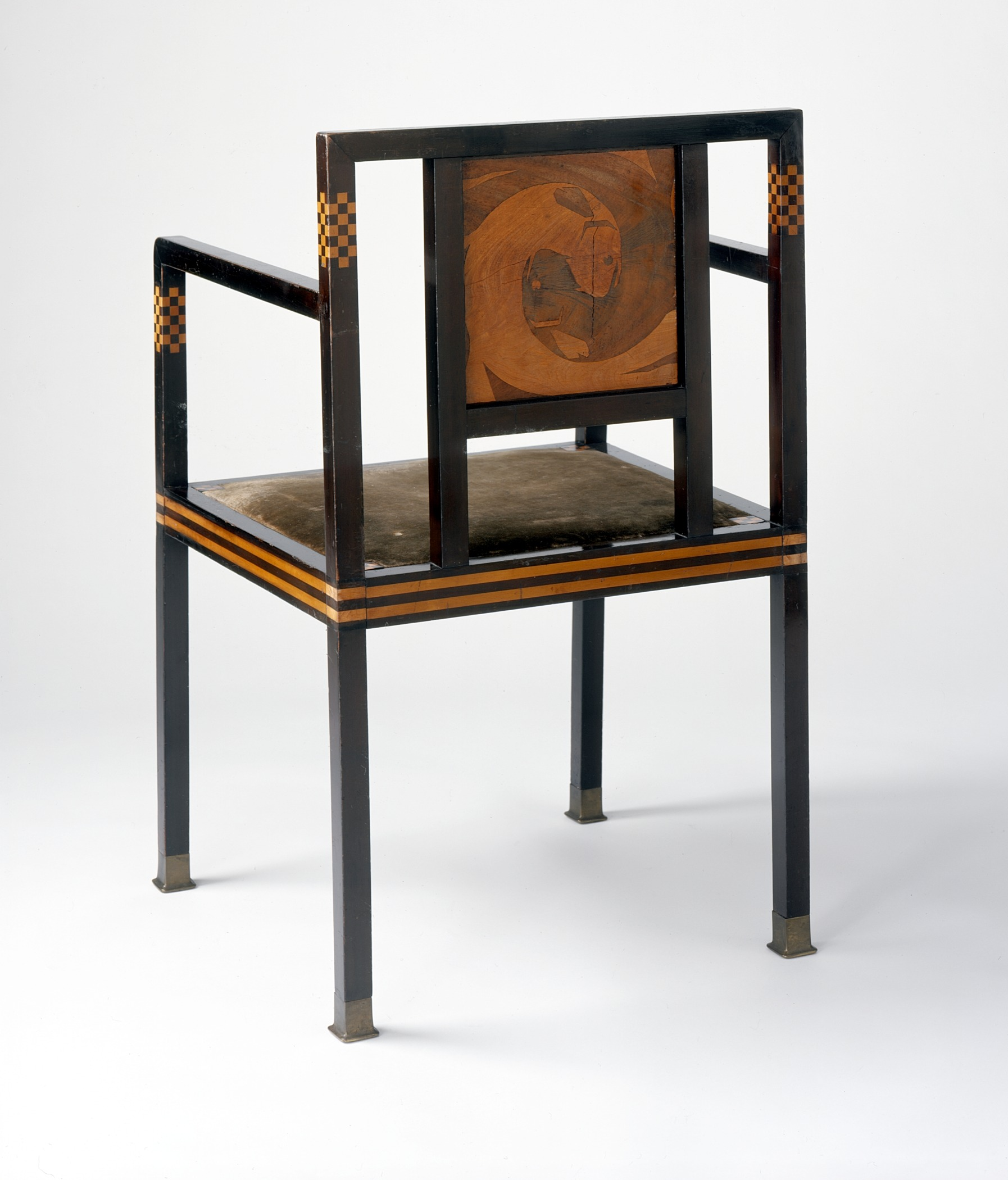
Armchair

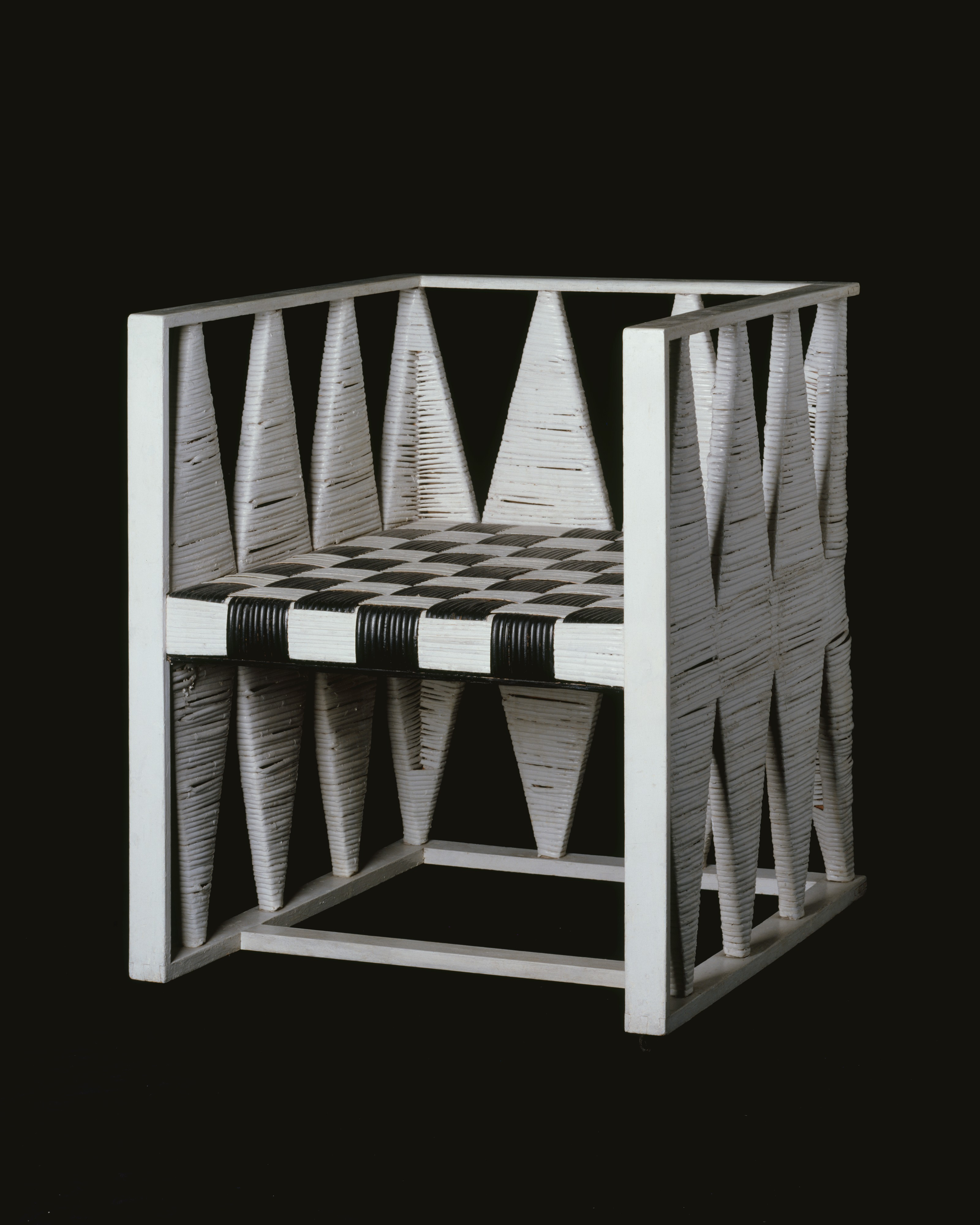
Armchair designed by Moser and Josef Hoffmann (1903)

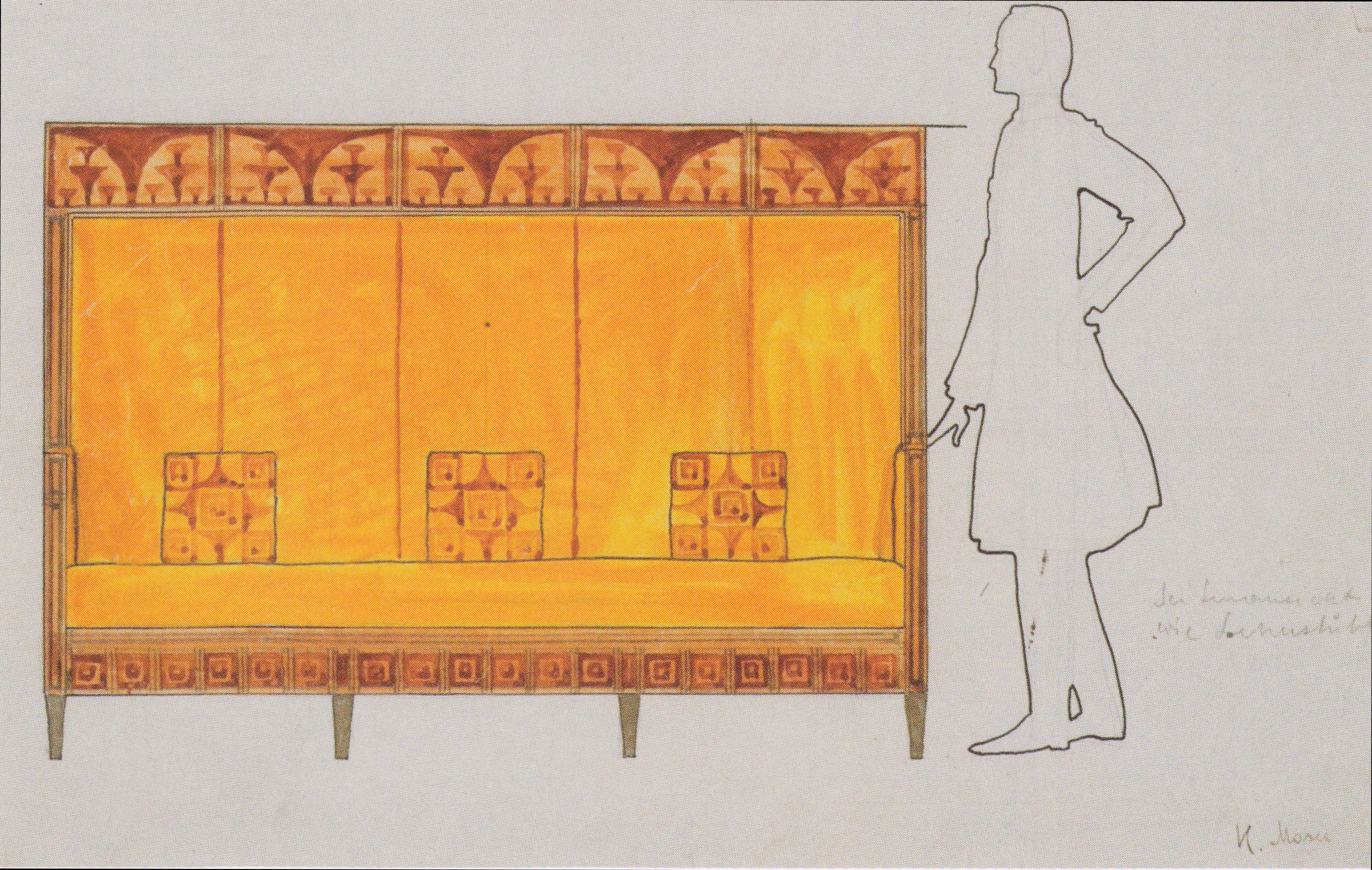
1903

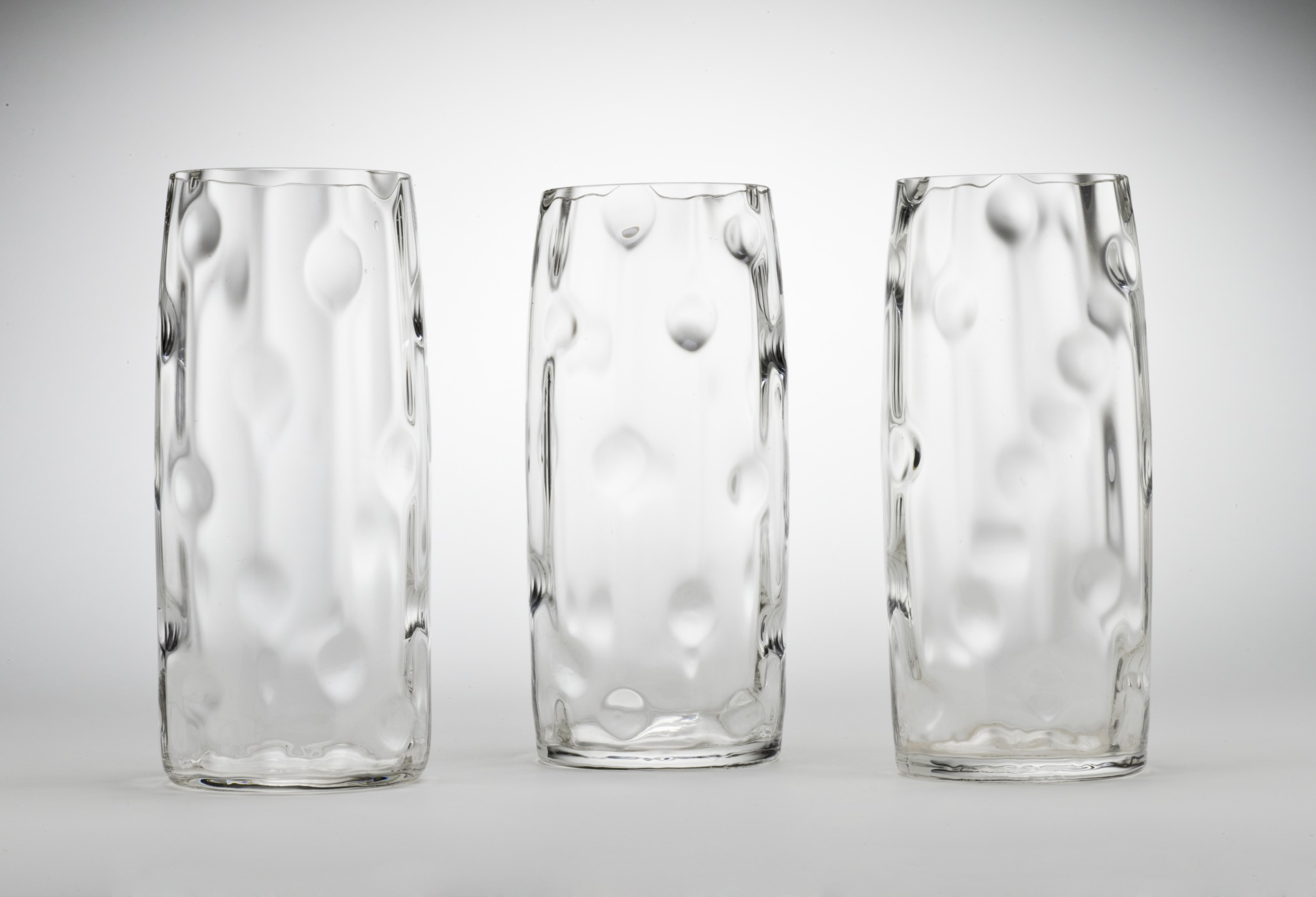
Beer Glasses (c. 1900)

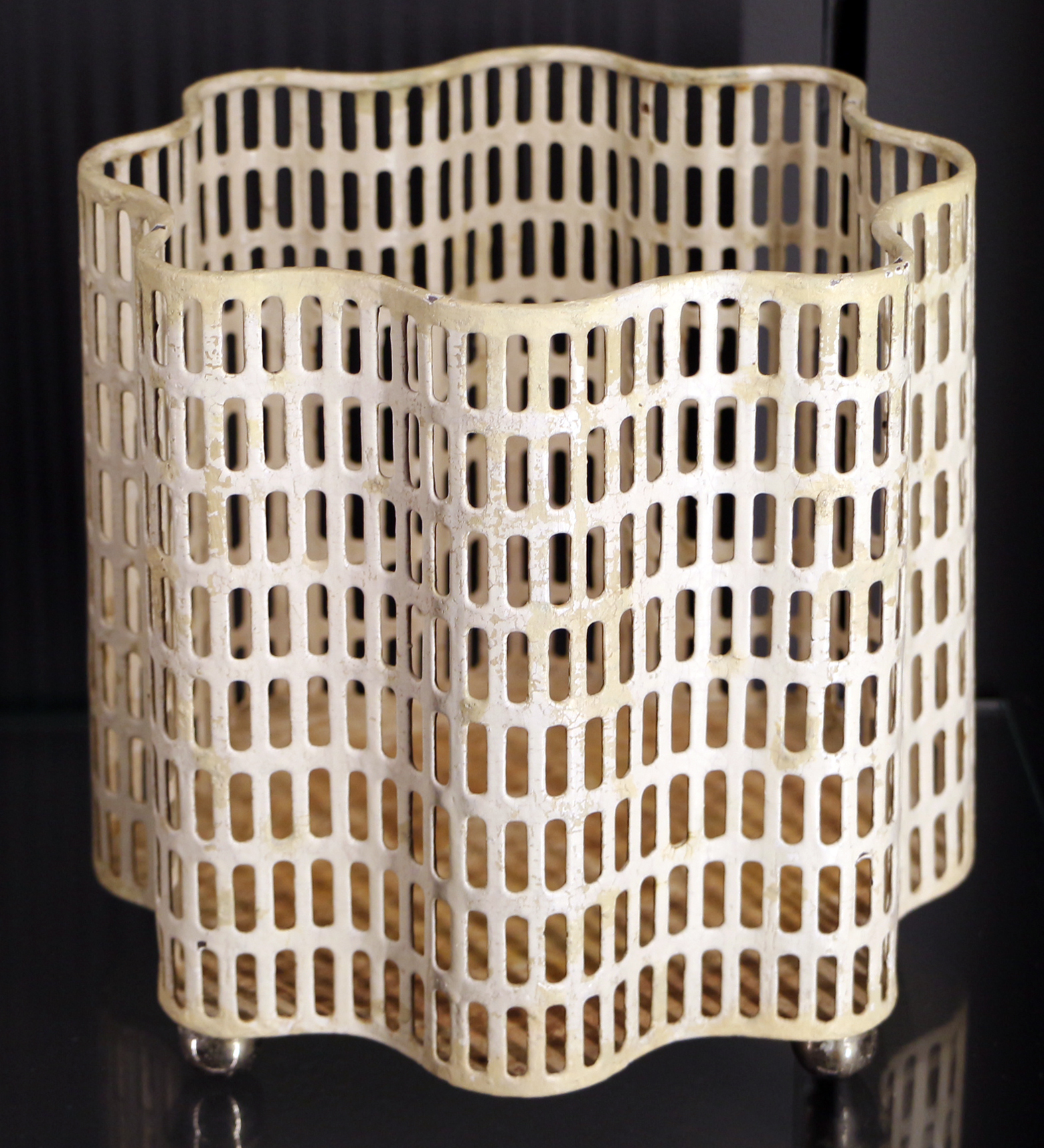
Basket in painted perforated metal (c. 1904)

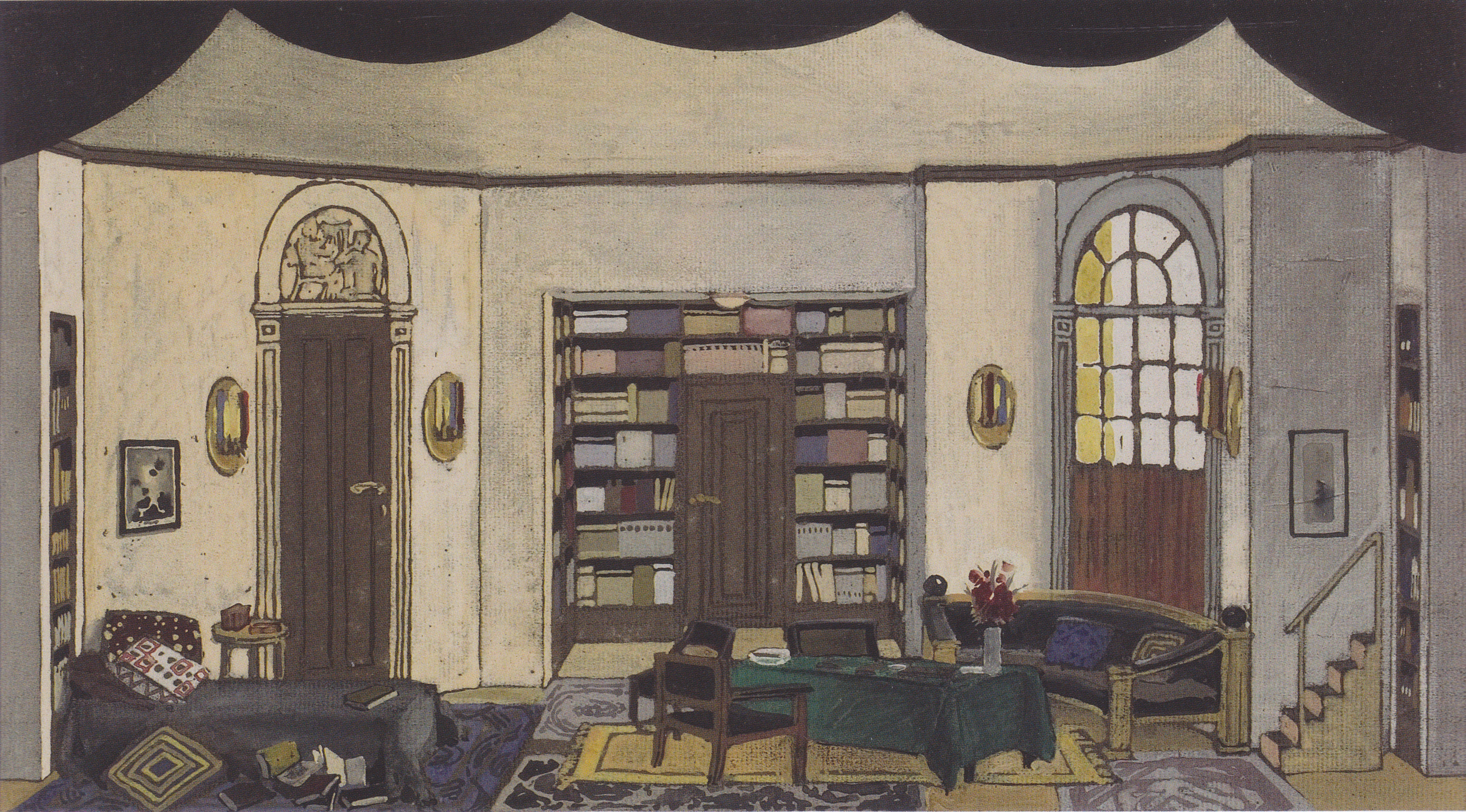
Set design for "Das Phantom"

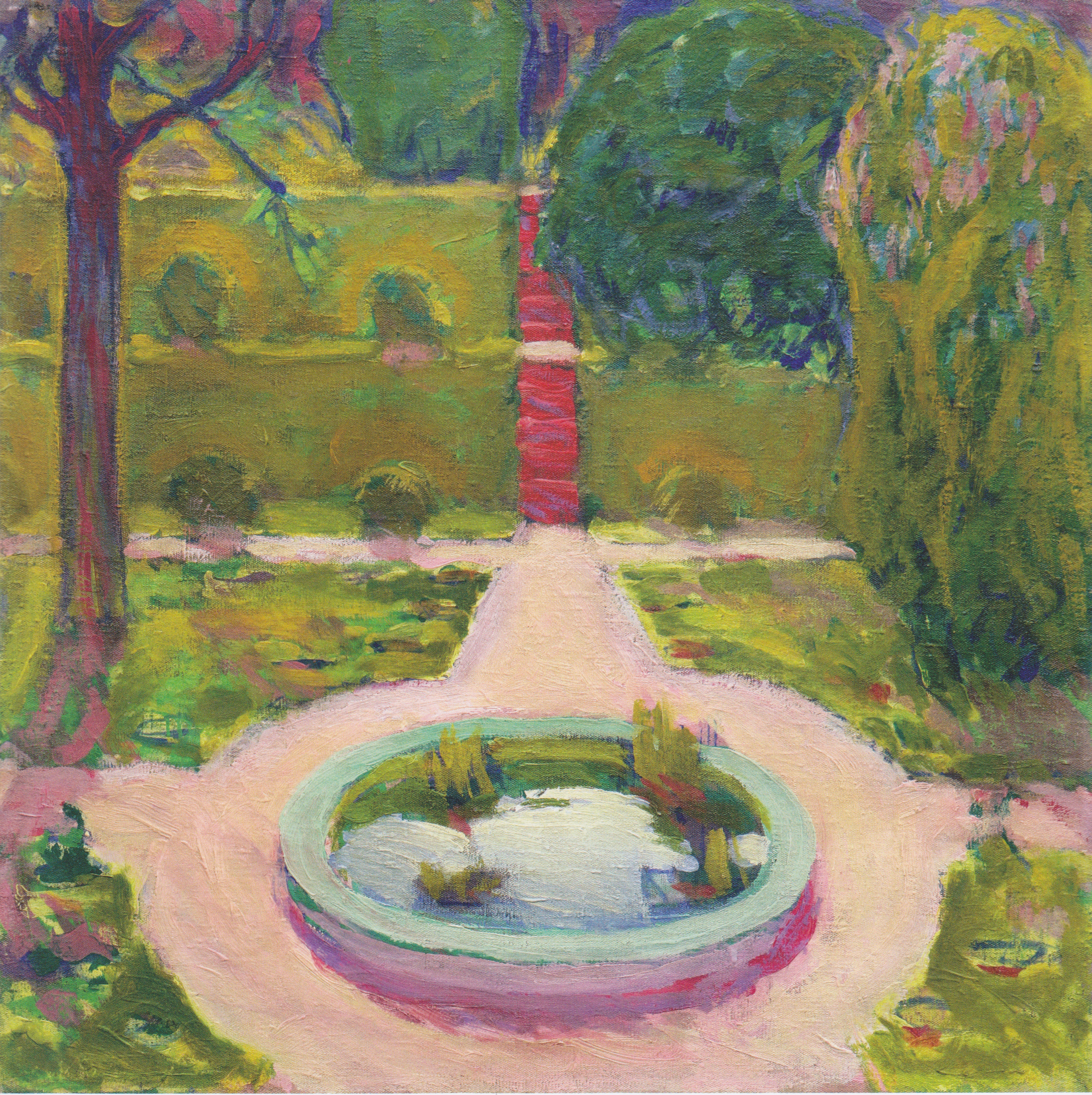
1911

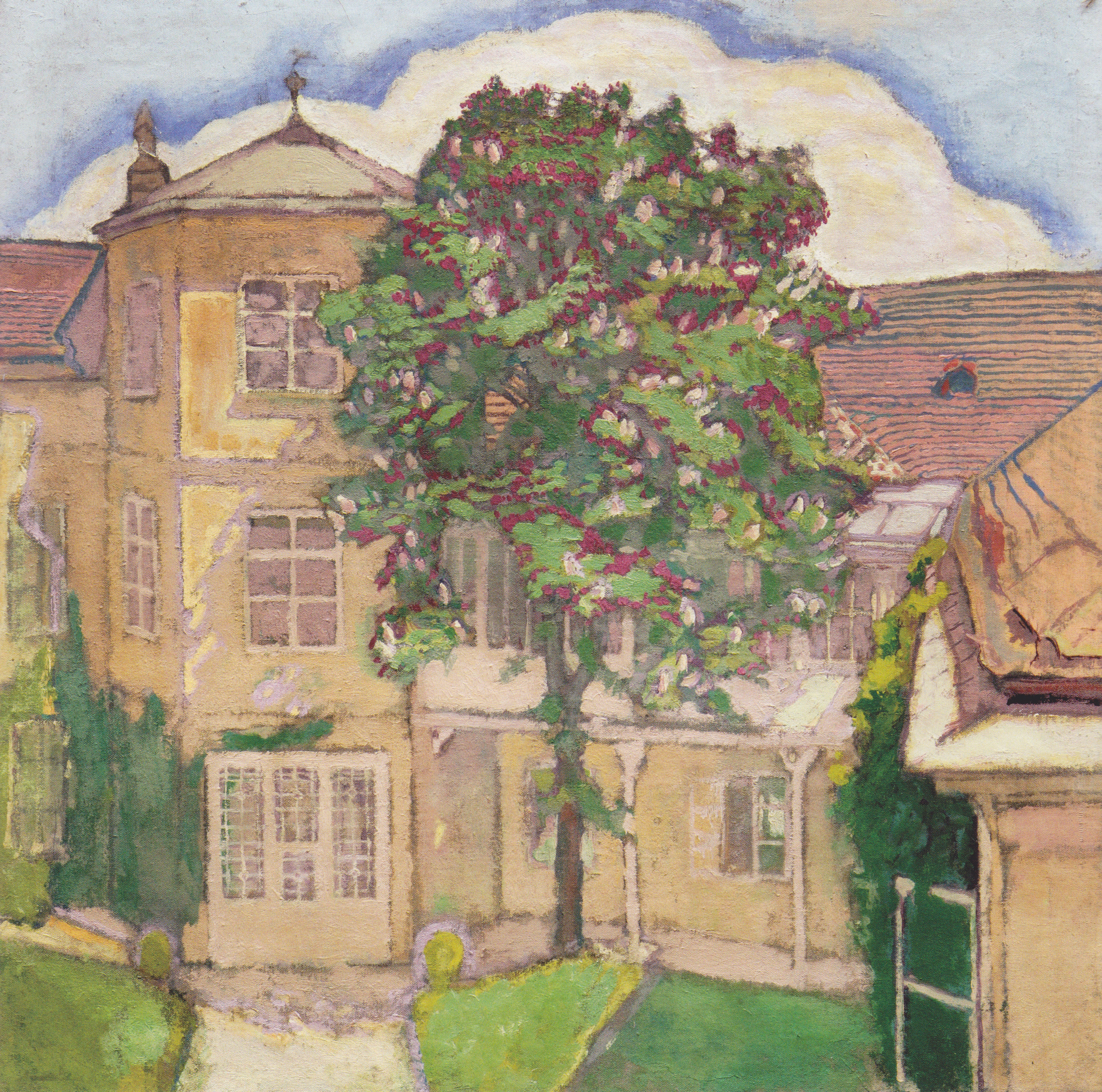
1912

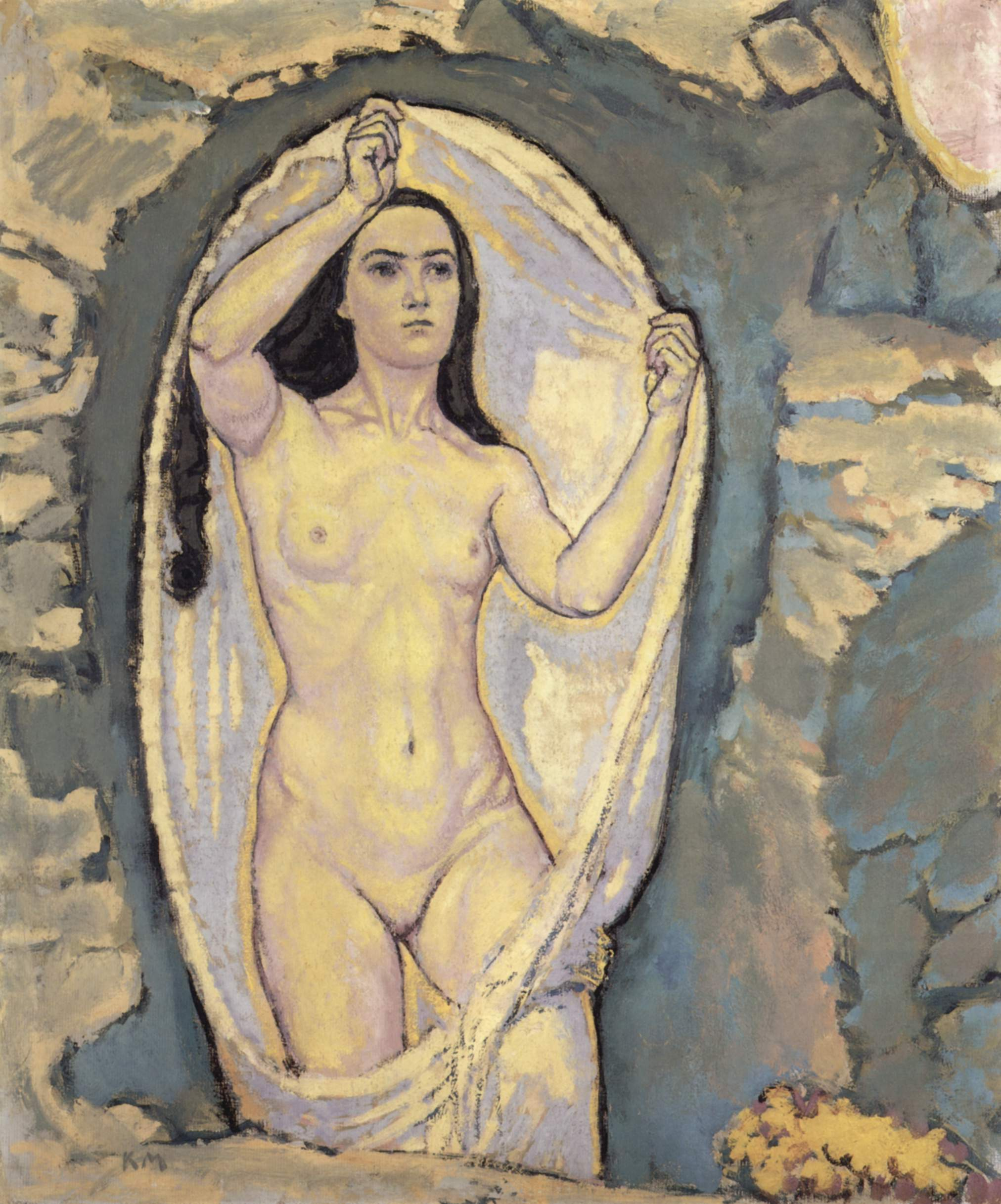
Venus in the Grotto (ca. 1914)

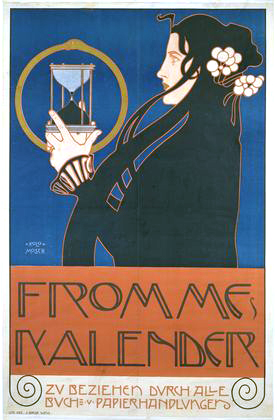
Poster for 'Frommes Kalender' (1899), colour lithograph

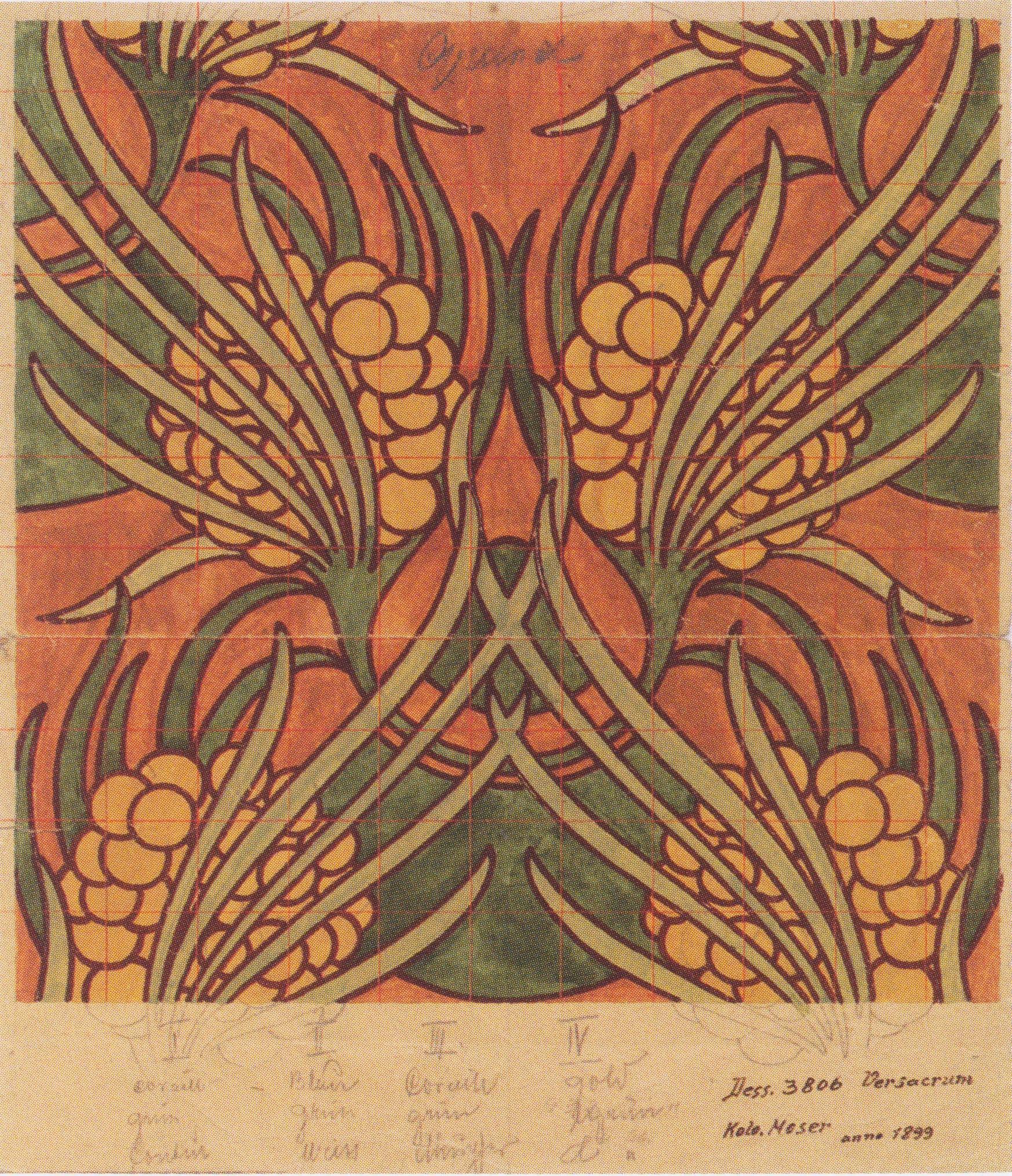
Artwork 'Ambilech' for Joh. Backhausen & Söhne (1899)

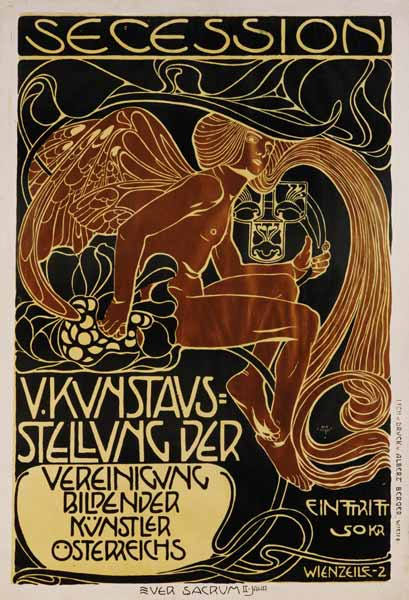
Poster (1899)

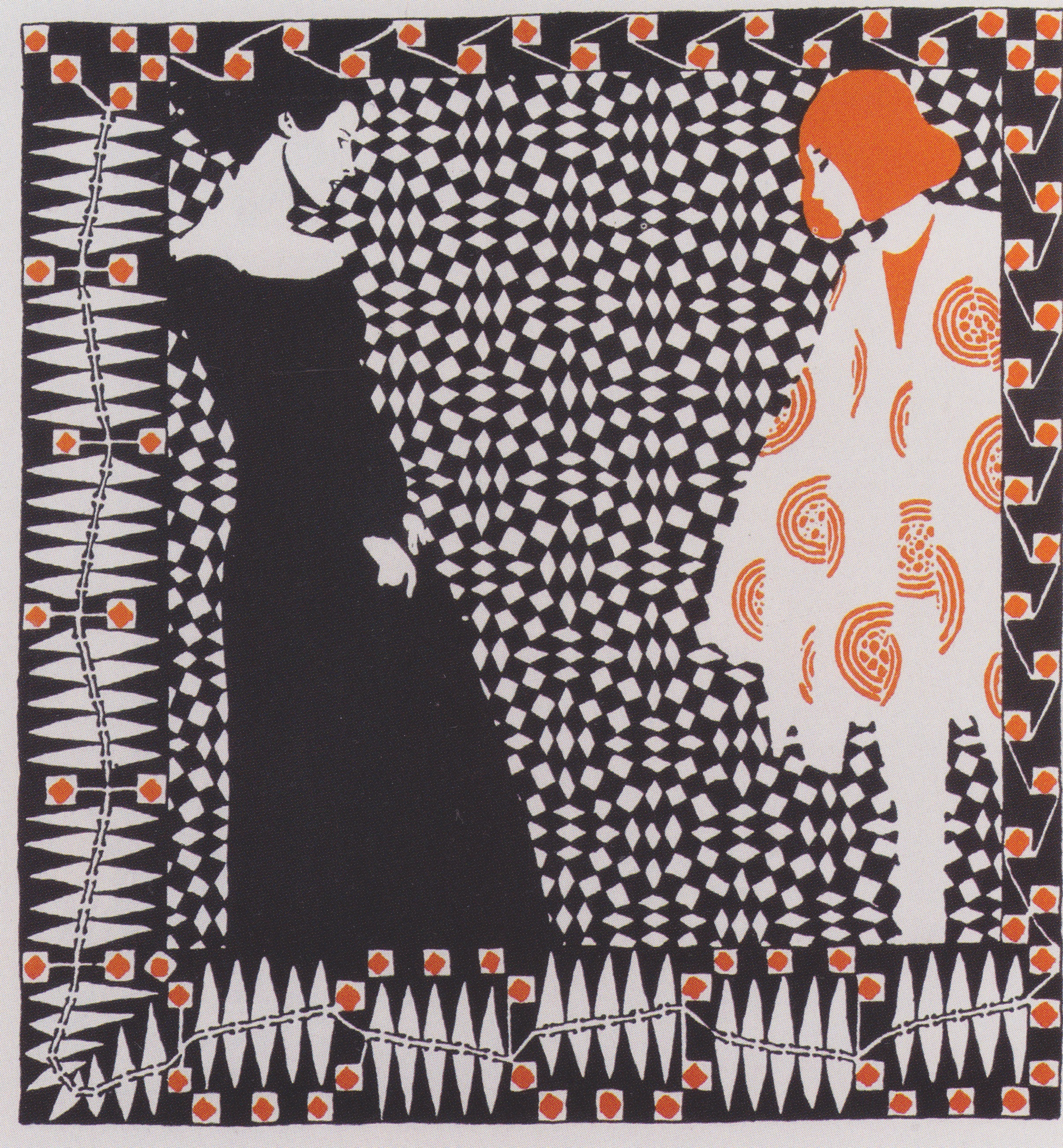
1900

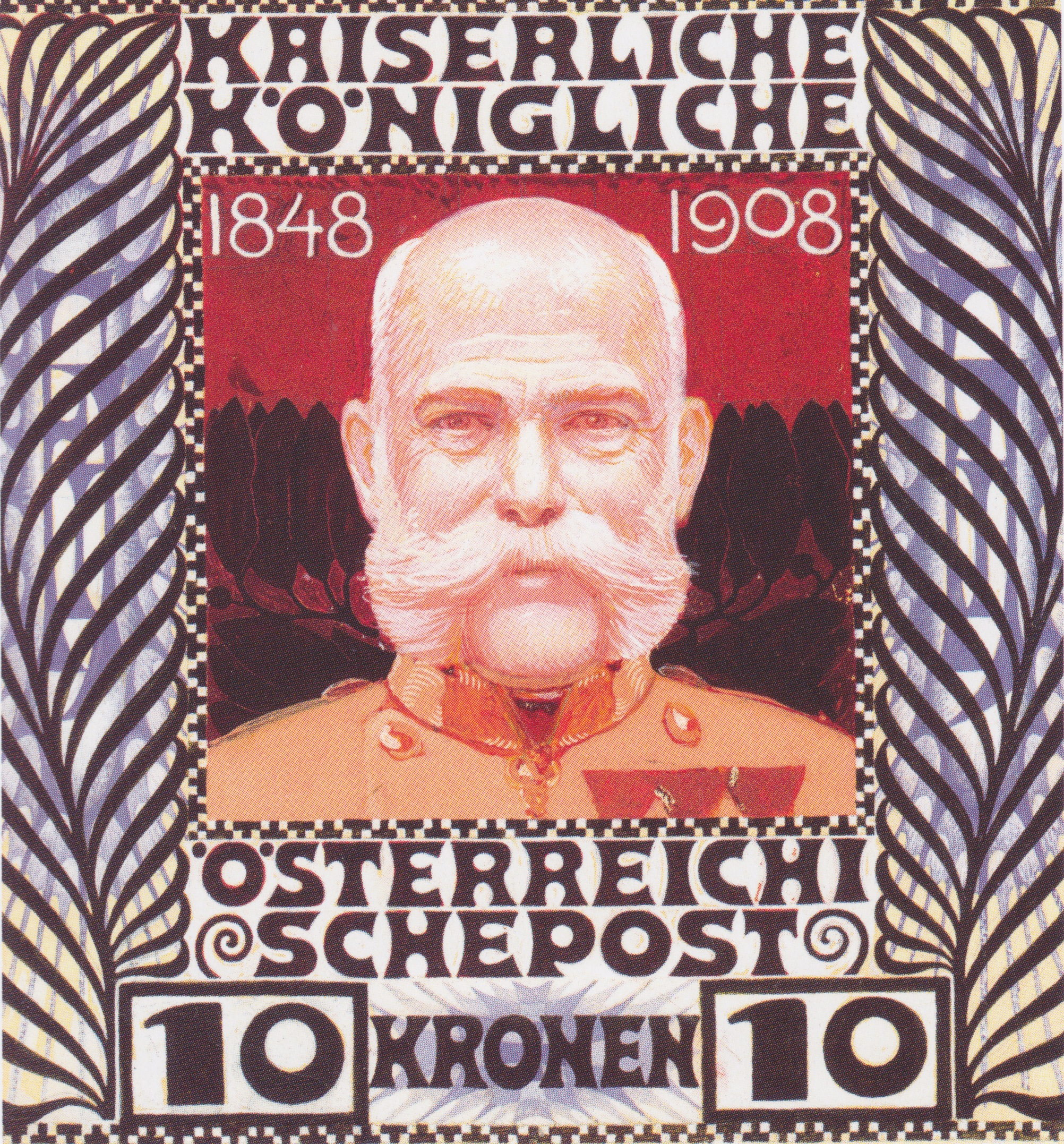
Emperor Franz Joseph on stamp (1908)

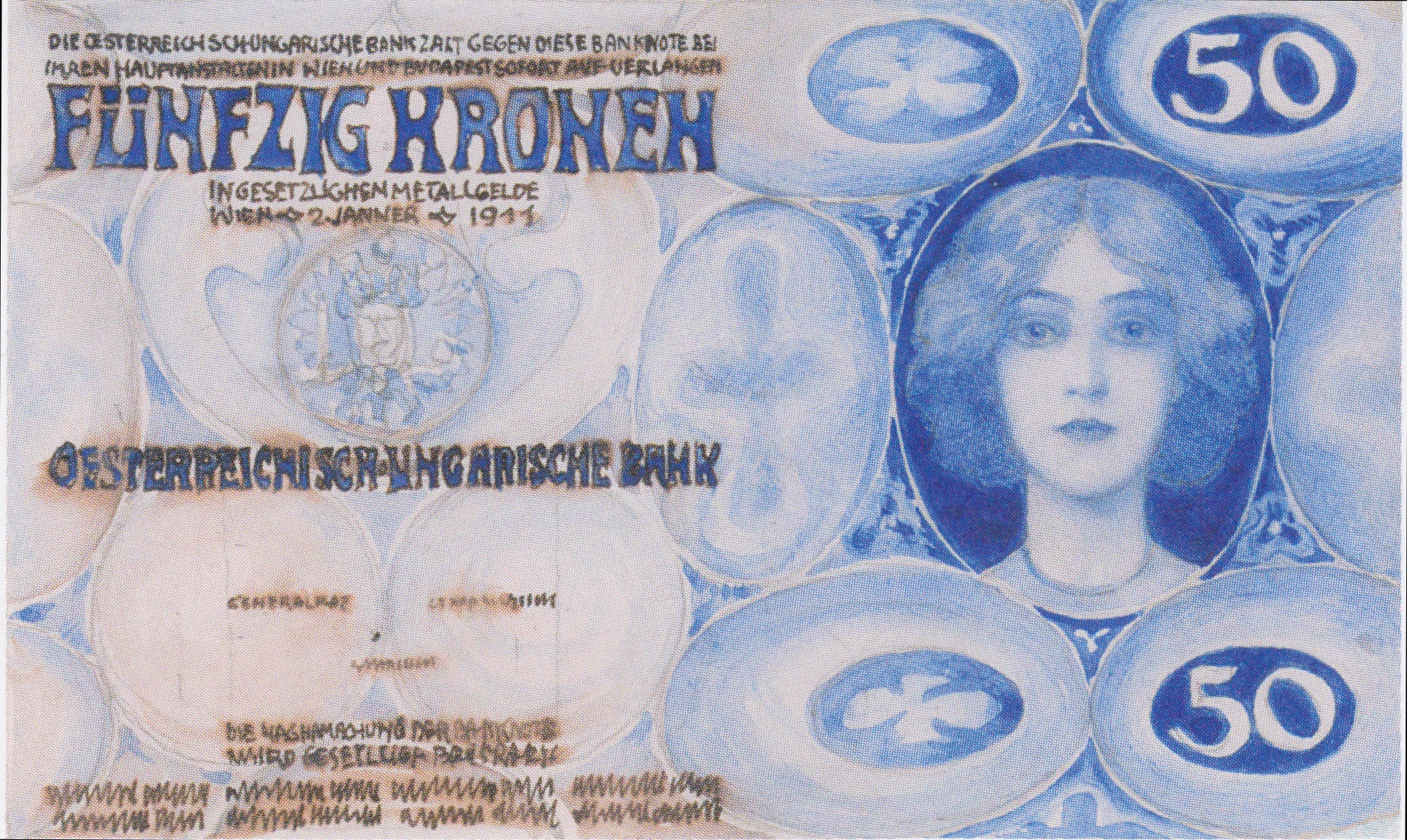
Austrian-Hungarian 50 Crown Banknote (1911)

== Auction ==
On 3 May 2010, Swann Galleries auctioned the third volume in Moser's three-volume series "Die Quelle," containing 30 sumptuous decorations for flat surfaces, such as tapestries, wallpaper and fabrics, in the original portfolio. Each plate was double-sided, with a colour design on one side and a black-and-white design on the other. It sold for an auction record price of US$12,600.

== Bibliography ==
- Stefan Üner: Koloman Moser. The Photographic Eye, in: PhotoResearcher, No 31, Vienna 2019, p. 134–147.
- Stefan Üner: Die Kunst der Präsentation. Koloman Moser als Ausstellungsdesigner, in: Parnass, 4/2018, p. 22–24.
- Stefan Üner: The Art Of Presentation. Koloman Moser As Exhibition Designer, Dissertation. University of Applied Arts Vienna, Vienna 2016
- Fenz, Werner (1984). Koloman Moser. Salzburg: Residenz Verlag. ISBN 3-7017-0369-8.
- Leopold, Rudolph; Gerd Pichler (2007). Koloman Moser: 1868-1918. Catalogue of the Kolo Moser exhibition in the Leopold Museum (25 May 2007–10 September 2007). Munich: Prestel Publishing. ISBN 978-3-7913-3879-8.
- Moser, Koloman (1998). Turn-of-the-Century Viennese Patterns and Designs. Dover Pictorial Archives. New York: Dover Publications. ISBN 978-0-486-40269-7.
- Rennhofer, Maria (2002). Koloman Moser: Master of Viennese Modernism. London: Thames & Hudson. ISBN 978-0-500-09306-1.
- Salm-Salm, Marie-Amelie (2005). Klimt, Schiele, Moser, Kokoschka. Paris: Editions de la Réunion des musées nationaux. ISBN 0-85331-934-0.
- Staggs, Janis (2008). Wiener Werkstatte Jewelry. Ostfildern-Ruit: Hatje Cantz. ISBN 978-3-7757-2165-3.
- Thun-Hohenstein, Christoph; Witt-Dörring, Christian; Schmuttermeier, Elisabeth eds. (2019) Koloman Moser. Universalkünstler zwischen Gustav Klimt und Josef Hoffmann/Universal Artist between Gustav Klimt and Josef Hoffmann, exhibition catalogue for the MAK/Austrian Museum of Applied Art, Birkhäuser, Basel. ISBN 978-3-0356-1849-5.
- Witt-Dörring, Christian, ed. (2013) Koloman Moser. Designing Modern Vienna 1897/1907, exhibition catalogue for the Neue Galerie New York, Prestel Verlag, New York. ISBN 978-3-7913-5294-7.
