= Gustav Klimt =

Austrian symbolist painter (1862–1918)

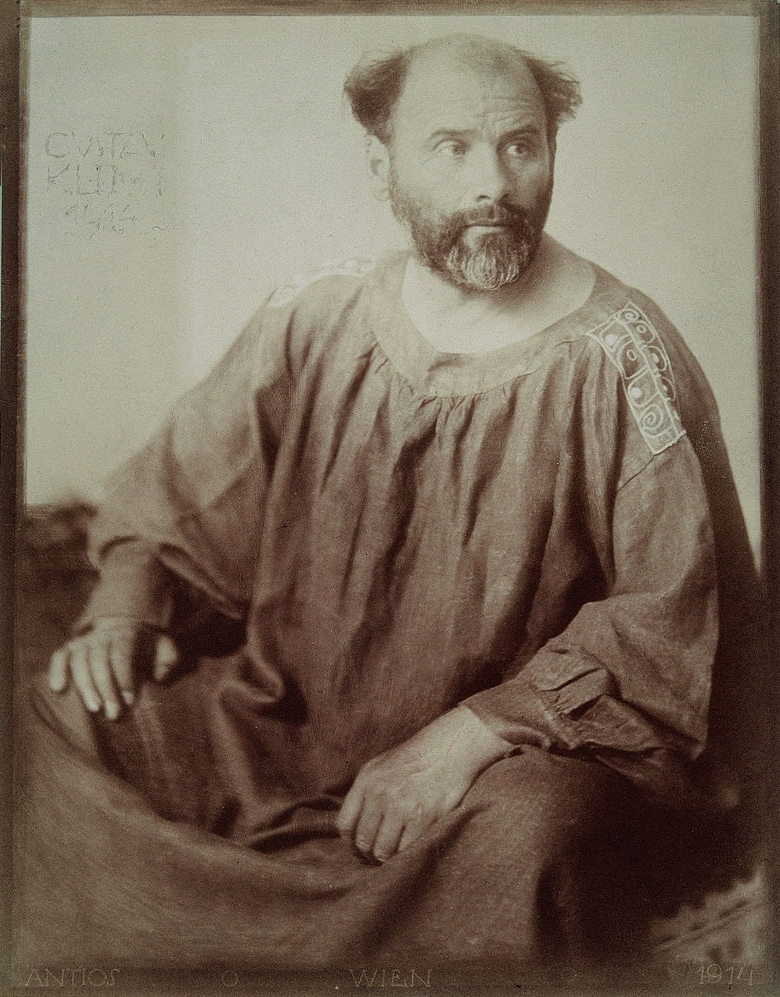
- Photographic portrait from 1914
- Born: 14 July 1862; Baumgarten, Austrian Empire
- Died: 6 February 1918 (aged 55); Vienna, Austria-Hungary
- Resting place: Hietzing Cemetery, Vienna
- Known for: Painter
- Notable work: Judith I, Portrait of Adele Bloch-Bauer I, The Kiss, Danaë
- Movement: Symbolism, Art Nouveau, Vienna Secession
- Partner: Emilie Louise Flöge

Signature
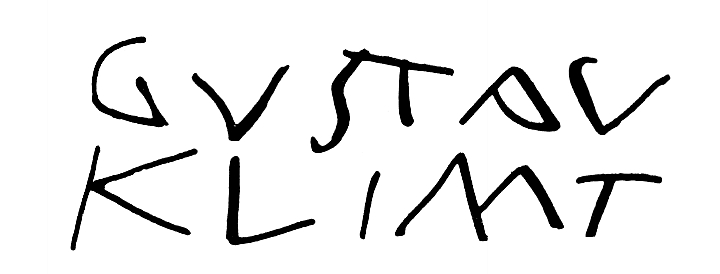

Gustav Klimt (14 July 1862 – 6 February 1918) was an Austrian symbolist painter and a founding member of the Vienna Secession movement. His work helped define the Art Nouveau style in Europe. Klimt is known for his paintings, murals, sketches, and other objets d'art. Klimt's primary subject was the female body, and his works are marked by a frank eroticism. Amongst his figurative works, which include allegories and portraits, he painted landscapes. He is best known for The Kiss and Portrait of Adele Bloch-Bauer I. Among the artists of the Vienna Secession, Klimt was the most influenced by Japanese art and its methods.

Early in his career, he was a successful painter of architectural decorations in a conventional manner. As he began to develop a more personal style, his work was the subject of controversy that culminated when the paintings he completed around 1900 for the ceiling of the Great Hall of the University of Vienna were criticised as pornographic. He subsequently accepted no more public commissions, but achieved a new success with the paintings of his "golden phase", many of which include gold leaf. Klimt's work was an important influence on his younger peer Egon Schiele.

Klimt died in 1918, having suffered from a stroke and pneumonia. Since his death, Klimt's paintings have brought some of the highest prices recorded for individual works of art at auction.

== Biography ==
=== Early life ===
Gustav Klimt was born in Baumgarten, near Vienna, in the Austrian Empire on 14 July 1862. He was the second of seven children: three boys and four girls. His mother, Anna Klimt (née Finster), had an unrealised ambition to be a musical performer. His father, Ernst Klimt the Elder, was a gold engraver from a peasant family in Bohemia. All three of their sons, including Klimt's younger brothers Ernst and Georg, displayed artistic talent early on. Klimt's siblings occasionally acted as models for his early works.

Klimt's father often struggled to find work, and Klimt lived in poverty while growing up. Between 1862 and 1884, the family had no fewer than five different addresses, forced to move in search of cheaper accommodation. The family's struggles worsened in 1874 when five-year-old Anna died after a long illness. Around the same time, Klara, the eldest child, became mentally disturbed and obsessed with religion. She never recovered, and their mother is believed to have suffered frequent, deep depressions.

Klimt received a basic education at an ordinary Bürgerschule, where his drawing ability was recognised as remarkable. At the age of fourteen, he was accepted into the Vienna Kunstgewerbeschule, a school of applied arts and crafts, now the University of Applied Arts Vienna, where he studied architectural painting from 1876 until 1883. He studied under Ferdinand Laufberger and later Julius Victor Berger after Laufberger's death in 1881. Klimt revered Vienna's foremost history painter of the time, Hans Makart, and aspired to replicate his success. Klimt readily accepted the principles of conservative training; his early work may be classified as academic. His professional career began by painting interior murals and ceilings in large public buildings.

=== The "Company of Artists" ===
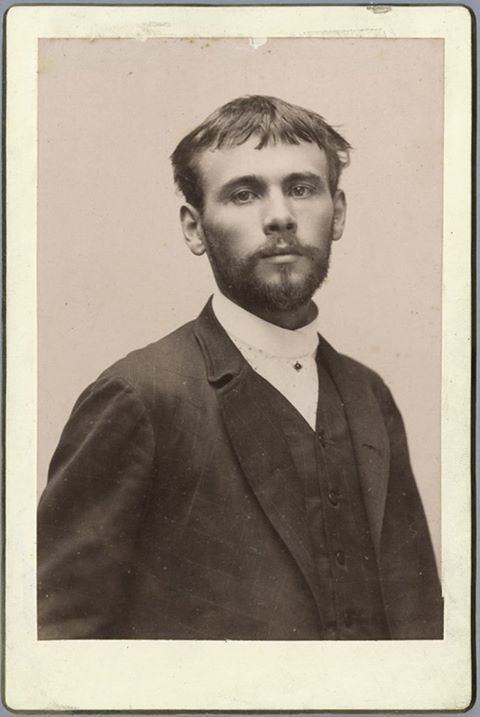
Gustav Klimt in 1887

In 1877, Klimt's brother, Ernst, who would become an engraver like their father, also enrolled in the Kunstgewerbeschule. Klimt, Ernst, and their friend Franz von Matsch, whom Klimt had met during the entrance examination, soon began working together. By 1880, they had formed a team called the Künstlercompagnie ("Company of Artists") and secured numerous commissions. They also helped their teacher in painting murals in the Kunsthistorisches Museum in Vienna. Laufberger recommended them to Fellner & Helmer, a Viennese firm specialising in theatre construction, with whom they were involved in many projects including in Fiume, Reichenberg, Karlsbad, and Bucharest.

After leaving the Kunstgewerbeschule in 1883, Ernst, Klimt, and Matsch moved into a joint studio in Vienna to work together on various commissions. This work included ancestral portraits based on engravings for the Romanian royal palace of Peleș Castle. In 1886, the studio partnership worked on painting decoration in the Karlsbad municipal theatre, notably painting the vaulted ceiling and theatre curtain. The same year they also started work on the ceiling and spandrel murals for the two staircases of the Burgtheater in Vienna. It is for Klimt's contributions to these murals that, upon their completion in 1888, Emperor Franz Joseph I of Austria awarded him the Gold Cross of Merit, the highest artistic honour available in Austria. He was also made an honorary member of the Ludwig-Maximilians-Universität München and the University of Vienna. Before the demolition of the Old Burgtheater, The Viennese City Council commissioned Klimt to paint a view of its interior. His painting Audience at the Old Burgtheater helped him obtain recognition among Vienna's high society, and he received public acclaim. In 1890, Klimt became the first recipient of the newly created Kaiserpreis award for this work.

In 1892, the Künstlercompagnie experienced continued success and moved into a larger studio in the Josefstadt district. However, later that year, Klimt's father died of a stroke, and his brother, Ernst, died from pericarditis after a heavy cold. Their deaths had a significant impact on Klimt, and he now assumed financial responsibility for both of their families. Grief may have impacted Klimt's artistic vision as he produced little work during the following few years. Following Ernst's death, the working relationship between Klimt and Matsch declined. Matsch moved out of their studio, and Klimt continued to occupy it alone. He would soon move towards a new personal style, characteristic of which is the inclusion of Nuda Veritas ("naked truth") as a symbolic figure in some of his works, including Ancient Greece and Egypt (1891), Pallas Athene (1898) and Nuda Veritas (1899).

Klimt met Austrian fashion designer Emilie Louise Flöge in the early 1890s, a sibling of his sister-in-law, Helene Flöge, who had become widowed after Ernst's death. Emilie became his lifelong companion and although their relationship was intimate, it likely remained platonic. Many scholars consider The Kiss (1907–08) to be an image of them as lovers. Five years earlier, Klimt painted a 1902 full-length portrait of her, Portrait of Emilie Flöge. He designed many costumes that she produced and modelled in his works. Klimt had many relationships with women and fathered at least fourteen children. After his death, the legal rights of four of these children were officially recognised.

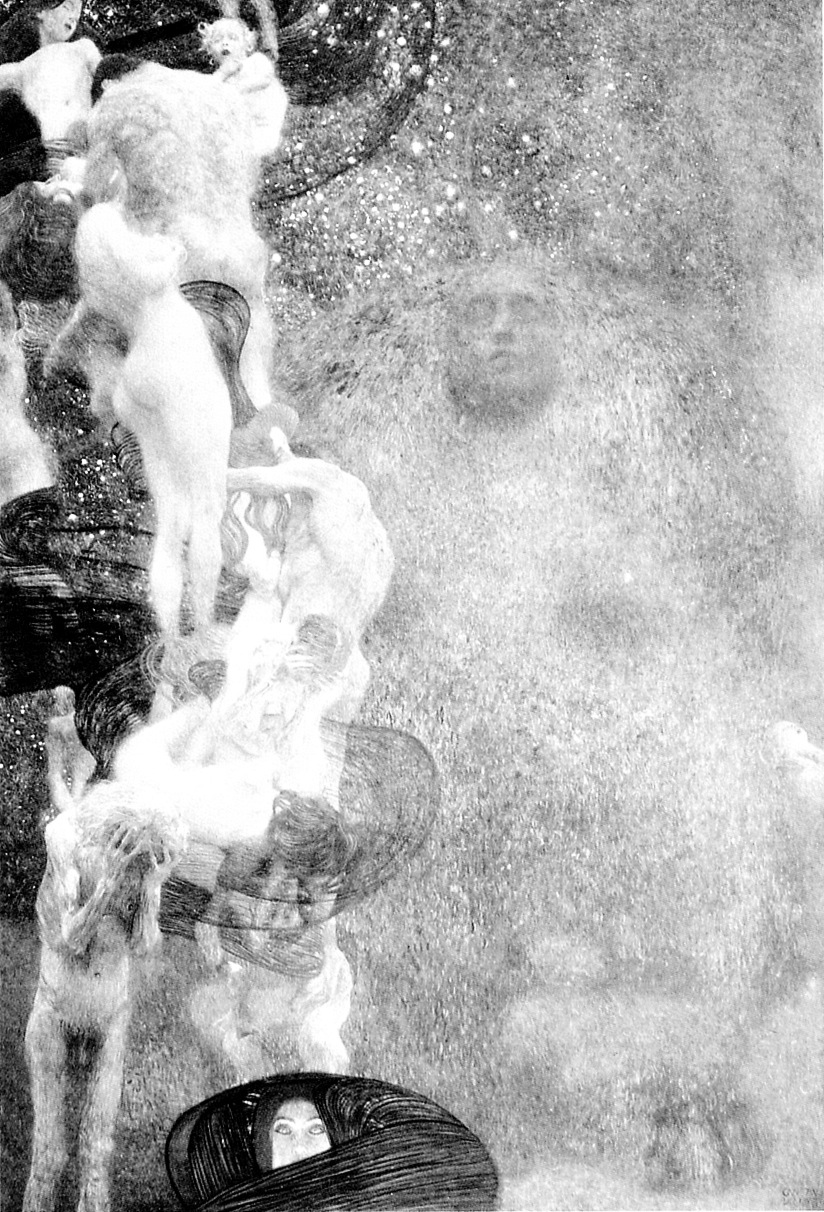
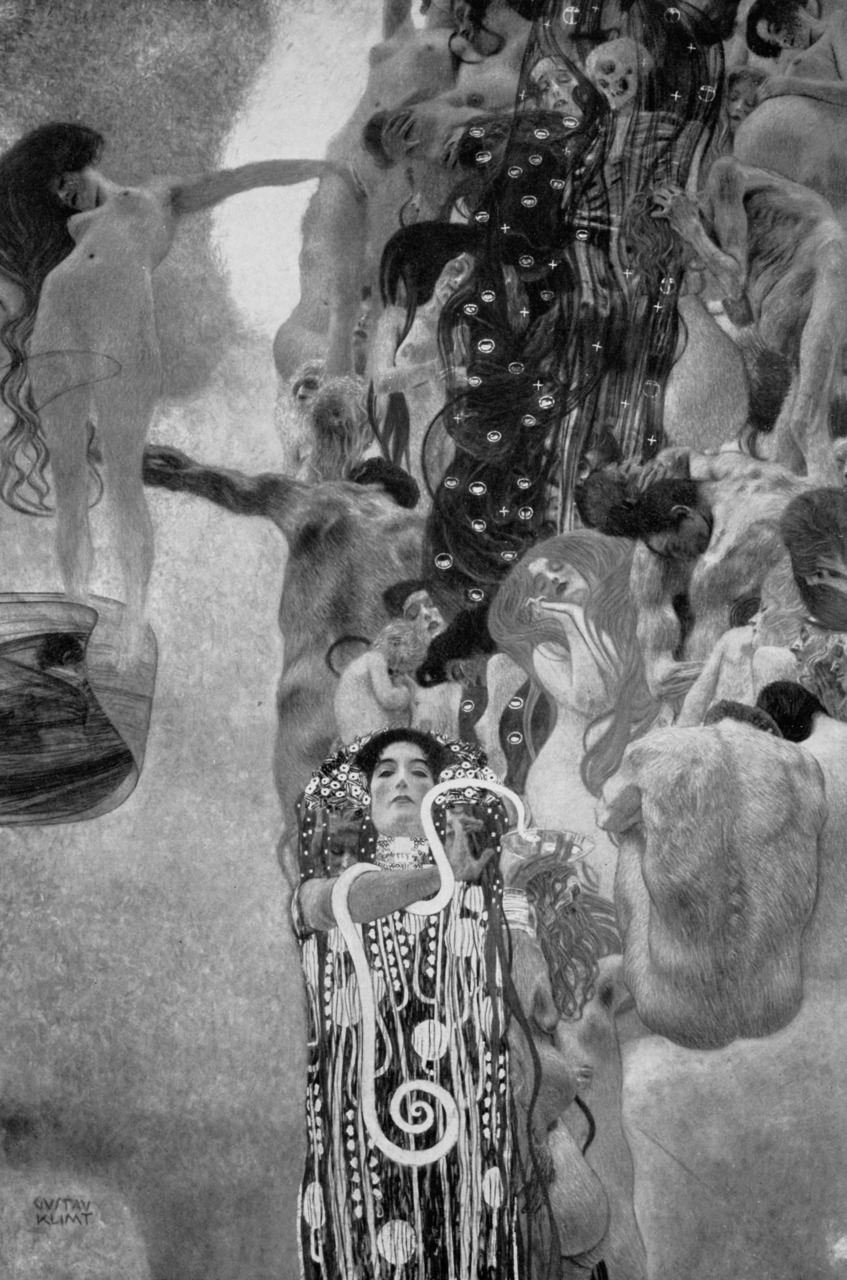
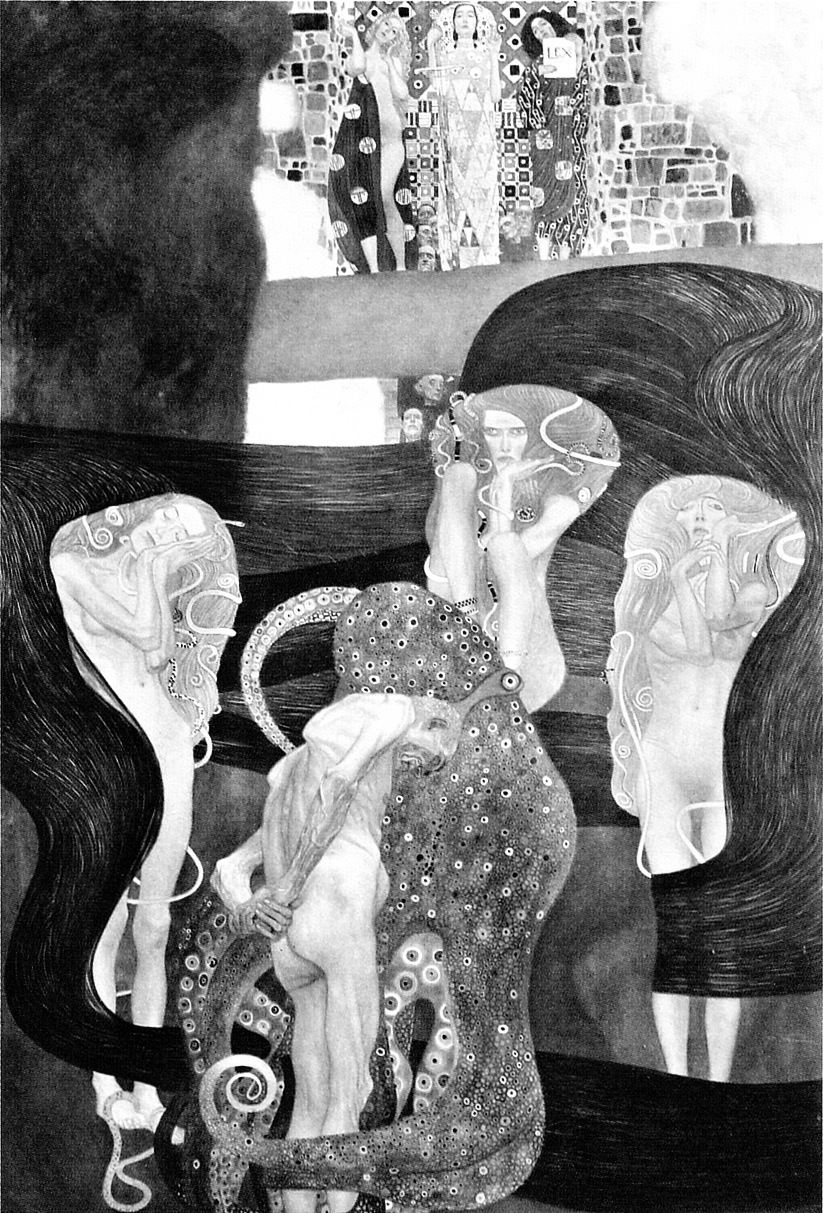
Philosophy (1900–1907), Medicine (1900–1907), and Jurisprudence (1903, final version 1907), for which Klimt received backlash.

Initially offered to Franz Matsch alone, but rejecting his sketches, in 1894, the Artistic Advisory Committee of the Ministry of Education commissioned Matsch and Klimt to decorate the Great Hall of the University of Vienna. Klimt was responsible for ten tympanum pictures and three of the five large ceiling paintings. These works represented the faculties of Philosophy, Medicine, and Jurisprudence and are known hence as the Faculty Paintings. Together with Matsch's Theology, they were designed to frame his central painting, The Triumph of Light Over Darkness. Not completed until the turn of the century, Klimt's paintings were criticised for their radical themes and material, and were called "pornographic". Klimt had transformed traditional allegory and symbolism into a new language that was more overtly sexual and hence more disturbing to some. The public outcry came from all quarters—political, aesthetic and religious. As a result, the paintings were not displayed on the ceiling of the Great Hall. (Note: On 11 November 1905, the artistic commission of the ministry of education examined the projects for the panels of the University' Great Hall. The Klimt's ones were welcomed, unlike Matsch's. However, it was proposed not to exhibit them in the Great Hall, but in the Österreichische Galerie Belvedere. Klimt rejected the proposal and on 3 April 1905 he wrote to the aforementioned ministry renouncing the assignment, and asking for the return of the sketches, declaring himself willing to return the sum of money that had been advanced to him. In: Dobai, Johannes (1978). The Complete Works of Klimt (in Italian). Milan: Rizzoli. p. 86.) This was to be the last public commission accepted by the artist. All three paintings were destroyed when retreating German forces burned Schloss Immendorf in May 1945, together with another ten paintings, including Schubert at the Piano (1899), Women Friends (1916/17), Wally (1916), and The Music (1897/1898).

=== Vienna Secession years ===
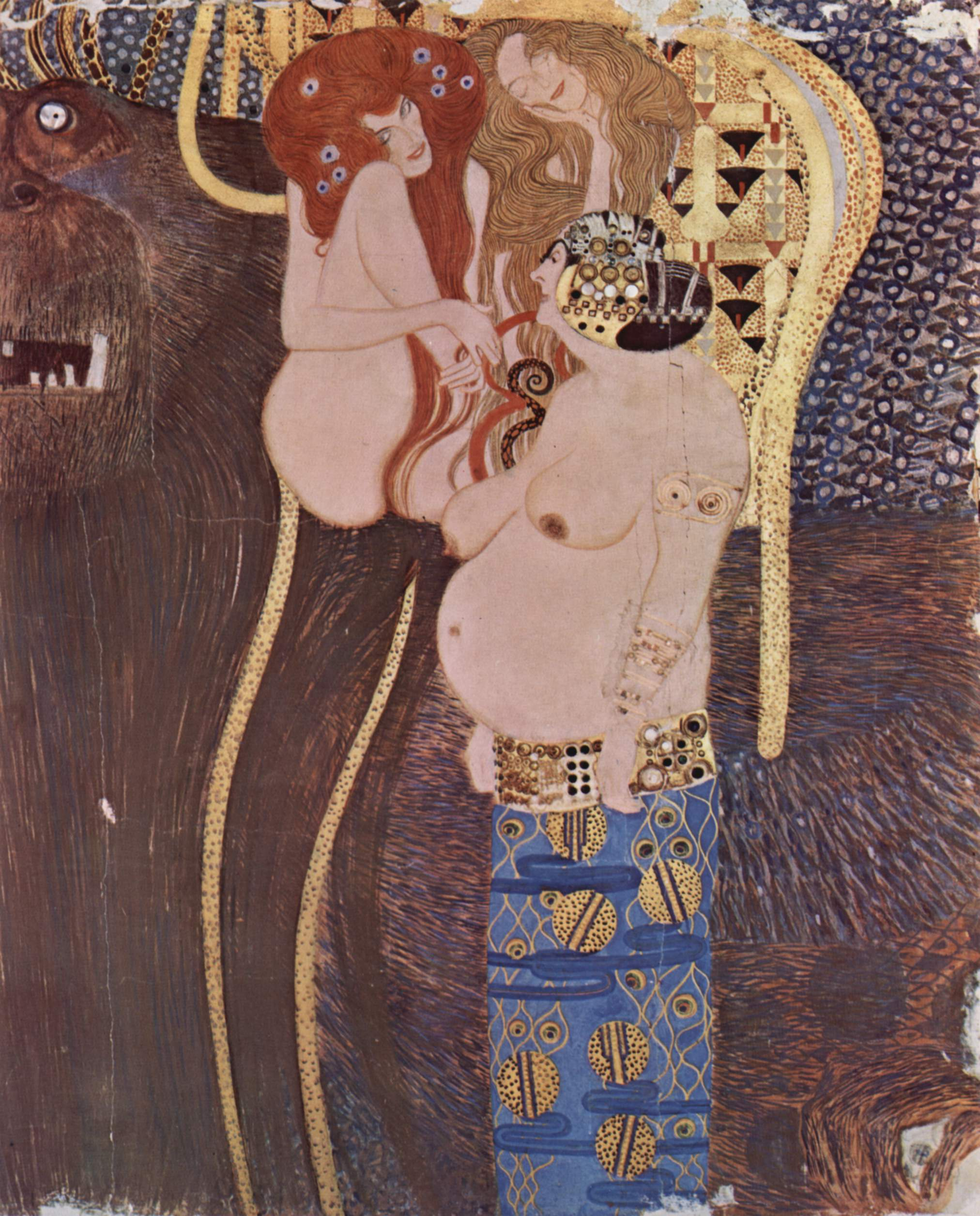
A section of the Beethoven Frieze, at Secession Building in Vienna (1902)

In 1897, Klimt became one of the founding members and president of the Vienna Secession and of the group's periodical, Ver Sacrum ("Sacred Spring"). He remained with the Secession until 1908. The goals of the group were to provide exhibitions for unconventional young artists, to bring the works of the best foreign artists to Vienna, and to publish its own magazine to showcase the work of members. The group declared no manifesto and did not set out to encourage any particular style—Naturalists, Realists, and Symbolists all coexisted. The government supported their efforts and gave them a lease on public land to erect an exhibition hall. The group's symbol was Pallas Athena, the Greek goddess of just causes, wisdom, and the arts—of whom Klimt painted his radical version in 1898.

His Nuda Veritas (1899) defined his bid to further "shake up" the establishment. The starkly naked red-headed woman holds the mirror of truth, while above her is a quotation by Friedrich Schiller in stylised lettering: "If you cannot please everyone with your deeds and your art, please only a few. To please many is bad." Historians believe that with the inclusion of Nuda Veritas, Klimt was denouncing both the Habsburg monarchy and Austrian society, which ignored all political and social problems of that time. In 1902, animated by resentment Klimt wanted to title the painting Goldfish (in which a naked woman ostentatiously and maliciously shows her butt), "To my critics", but was dissuaded by friends.

In 1902, Klimt finished the Beethoven Frieze for the Fourteenth Vienna Secessionist Exhibition, which was intended to be a celebration of the composer and featured the monumental polychrome sculpture Beethoven by Max Klinger. Intended solely for the exhibition, the frieze was painted directly on the walls with light materials. After the exhibition, the painting was preserved, although it was not displayed again until restored in 1986. The face on the Beethoven portrait resembled the composer and Vienna State Opera director Gustav Mahler.

In 1905, dissensions within the Secession intensified, and when the artistic consultant of the Galerie Miethke, Carl Moll, was attacked by colleagues of the Secession for his work, a strong controversy arose that created a real internal split, led by Klimt. The following year, Klimt formed the group called "Kunstschau" (Art Show) or "Klimt group", which also included Moll and Otto Wagner, among other important Austrian artists.

During this period, Klimt did not confine himself to public commissions. Beginning in the late 1890s, he took annual summer holidays with the Flöge family on the shores of Attersee and painted many of his landscapes there, such as Schloss by the Water. These landscapes constitute the only genre aside from figure painting that seriously interested Klimt. In recognition of his intensity, the locals called him Waldschrat ("forest demon"). Klimt's Attersee paintings are characterised by the same refinement of design and emphatic patterning as the figural pieces. Deep space in the Attersee works is flattened so efficiently to a single plane that it is believed that Klimt painted them by using a telescope.

=== Golden phase and critical success ===
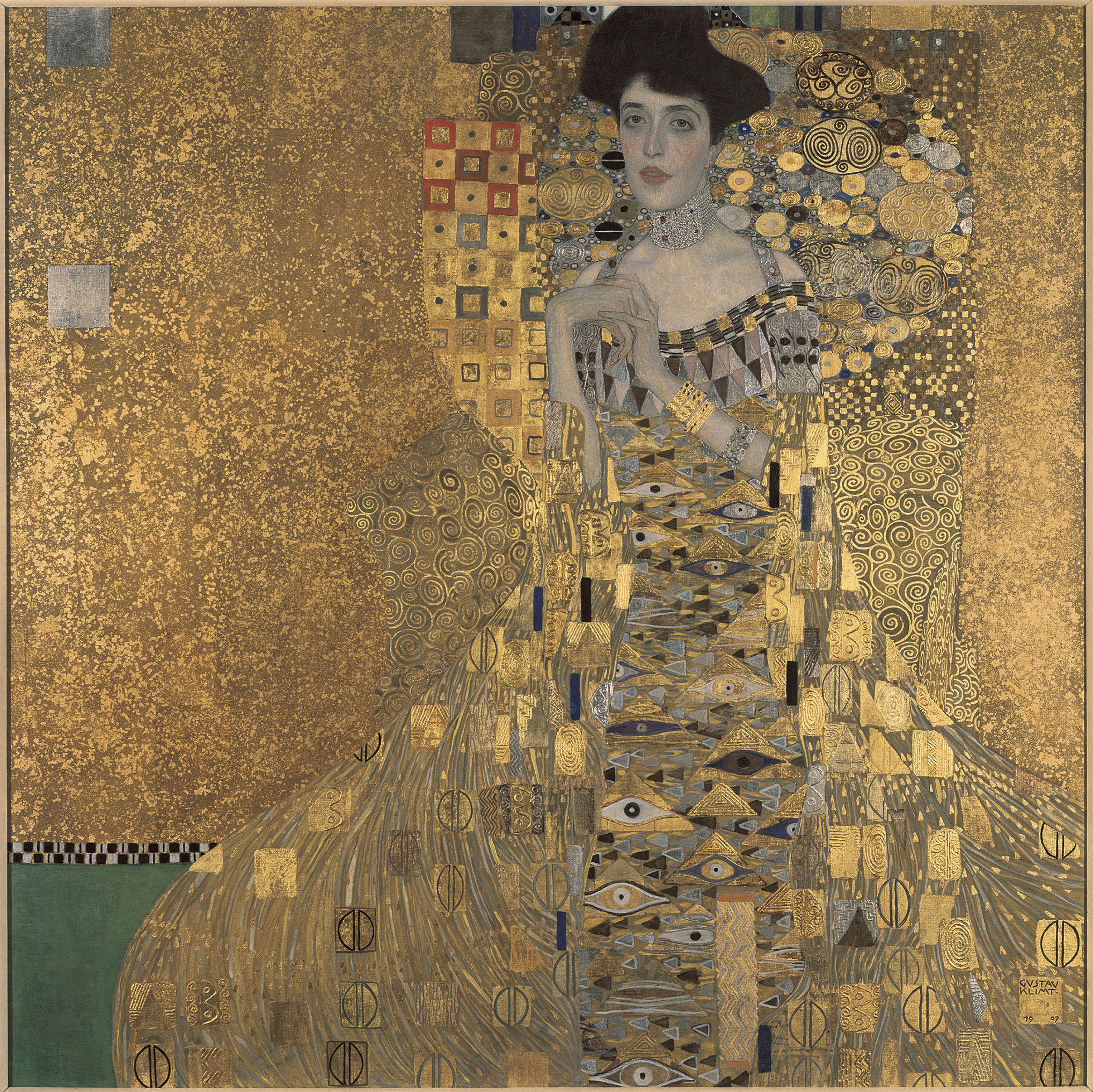
Adele Bloch-Bauer I, which sold for a record US$135M in 2006, Neue Galerie New York (1907)

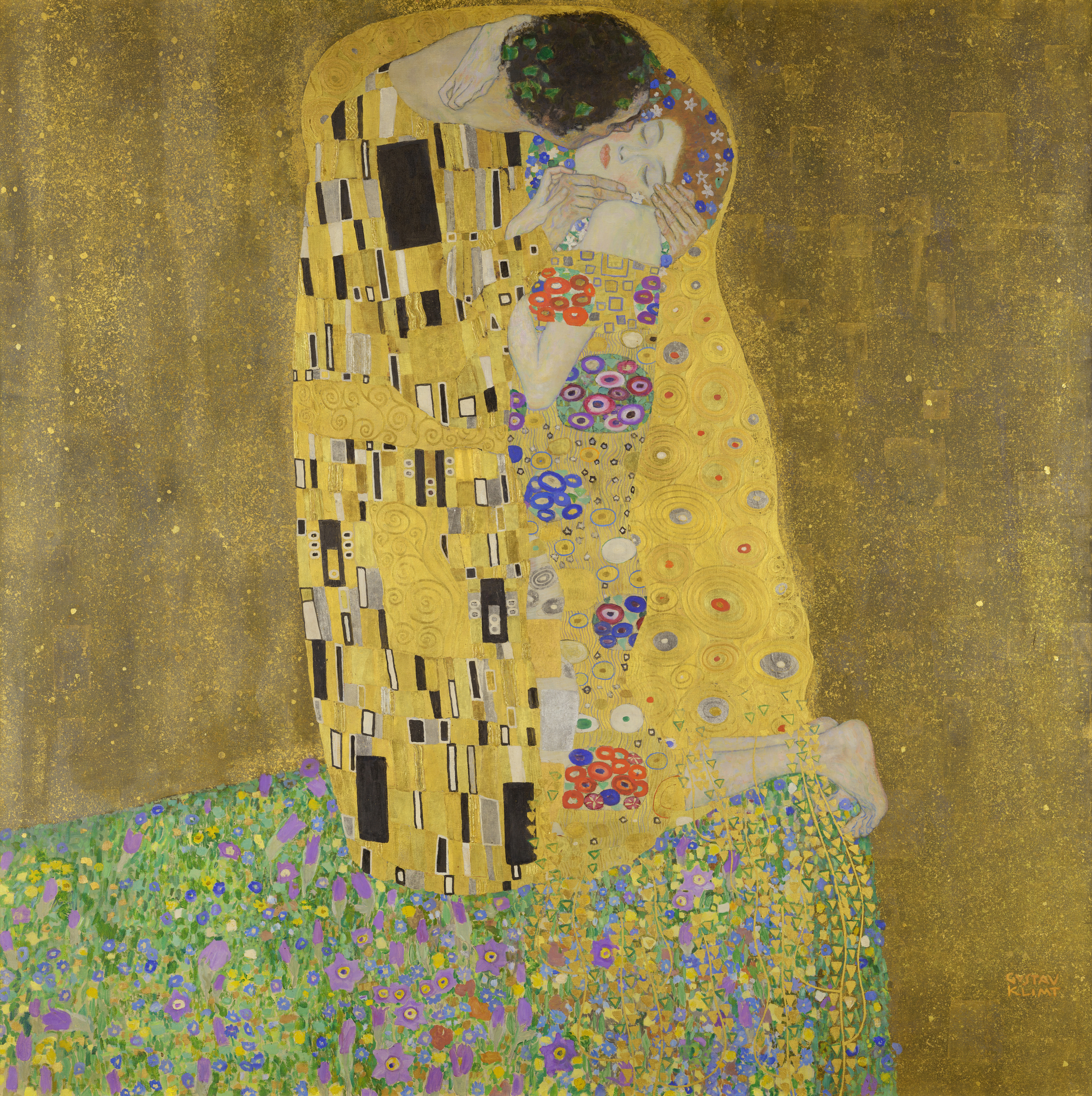
The Kiss, oil on canvas, Österreichische Galerie Belvedere (1907–1908)

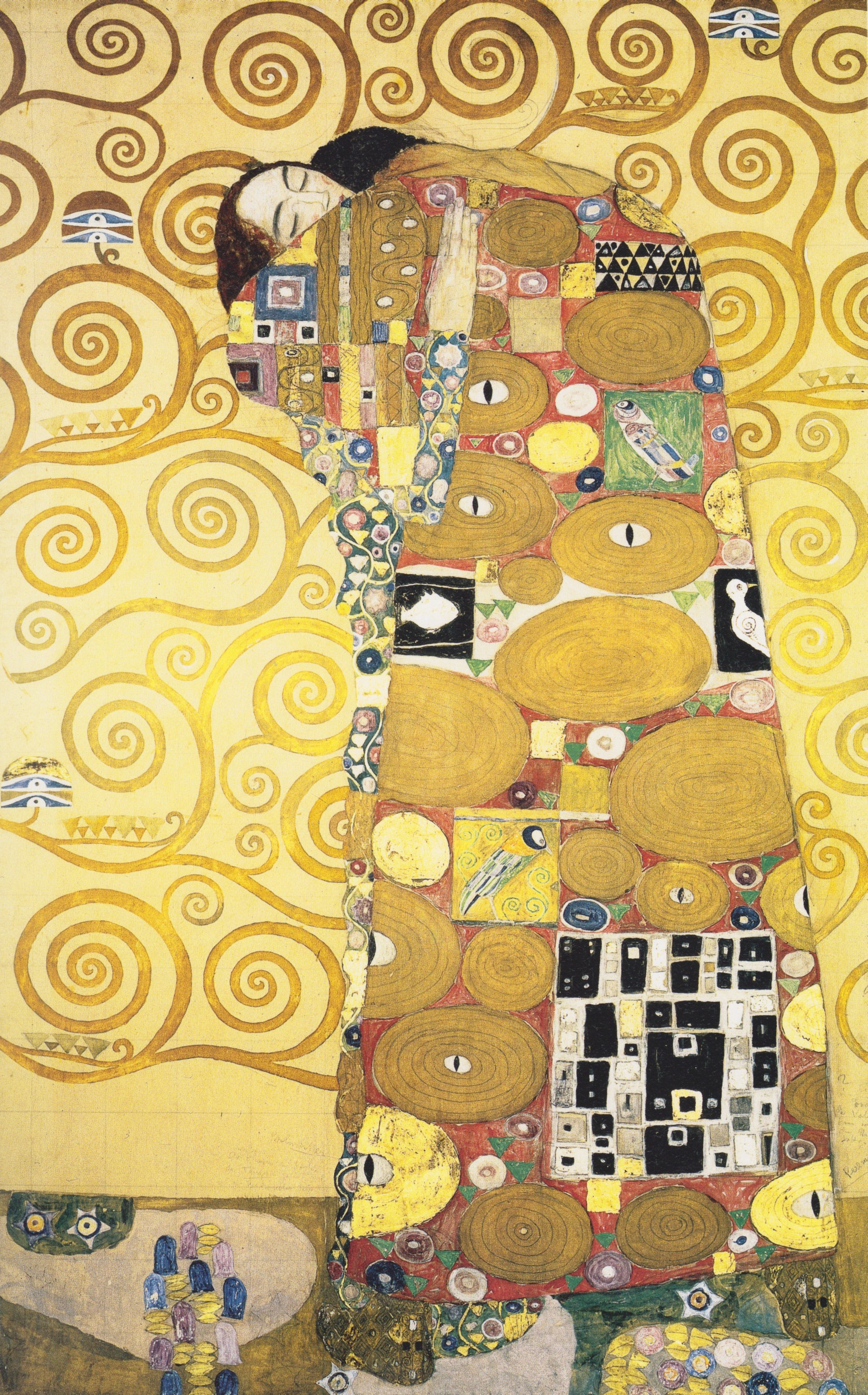
Klimt often used decorative patterns in his paintings. Die Umarmung ('The Embrace'), the Stoclet Palace (1905–1909)

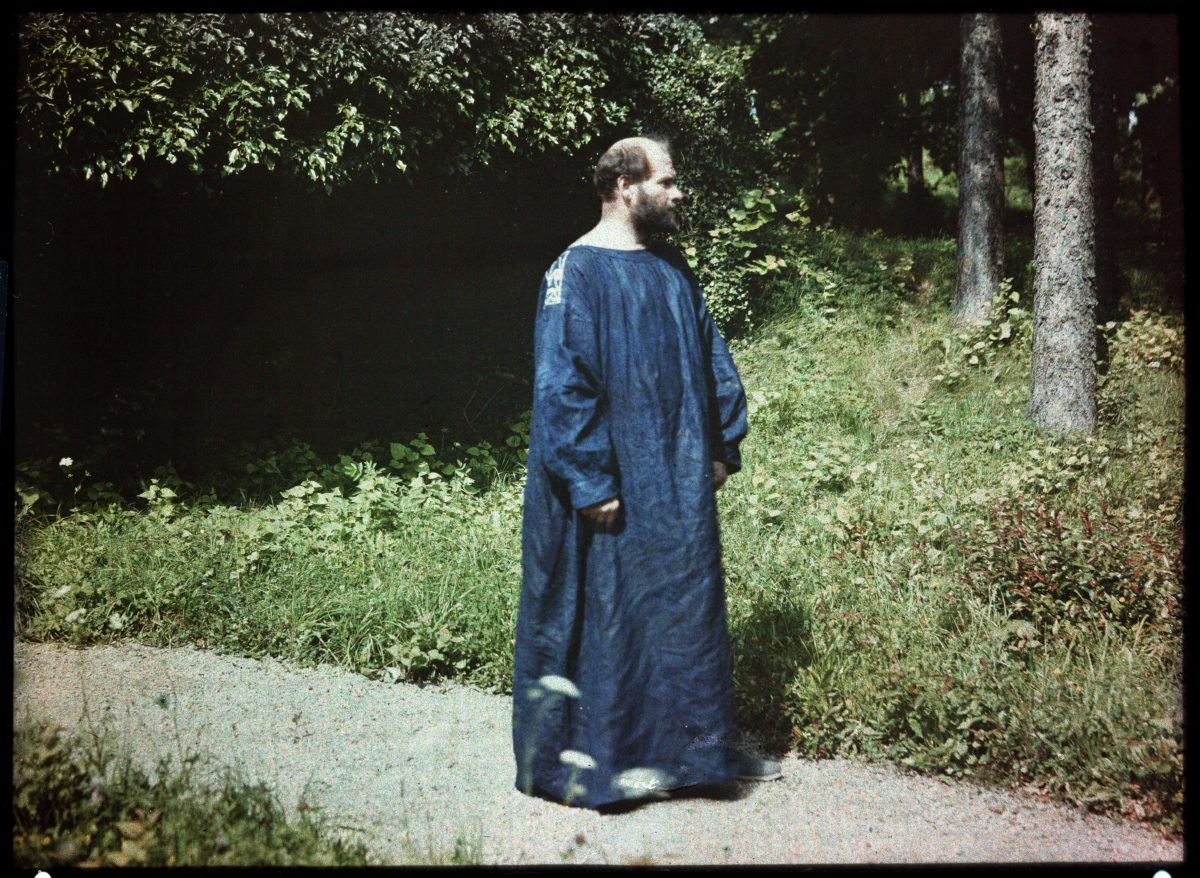
An early colour photo taken of Klimt using Autochrome technology, 1910s

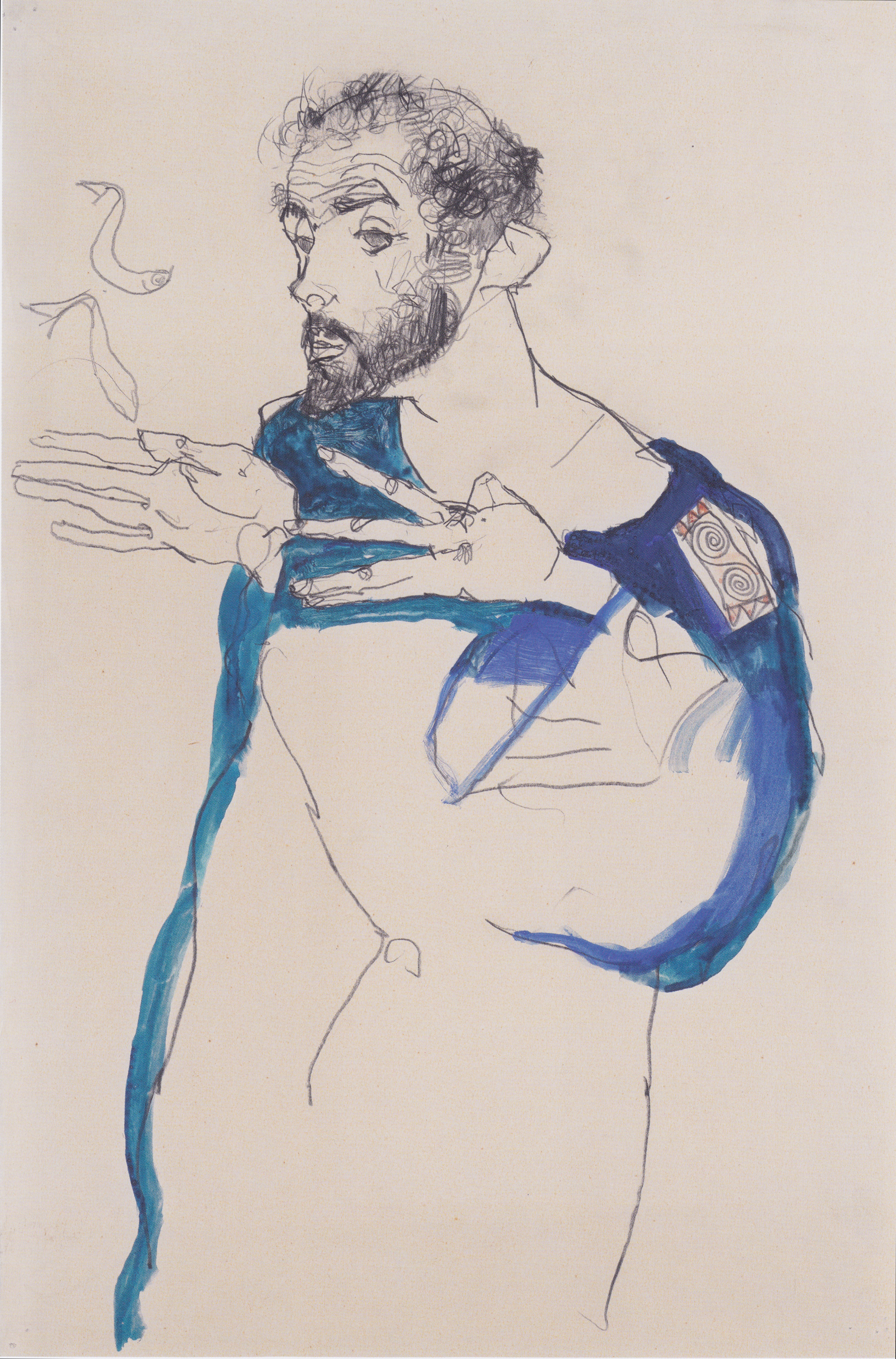
Klimt in a light Blue Smock by Egon Schiele (1913)

From 1900, Gustav Klimt became famous above all as a "painter of women". He created about one large-format portrait of a woman per year, in which he applied the principles of Art Nouveau—flatness, decoration, and gold leaf application. At the same time, he devoted himself to allegories and Old Testament heroines, which he transformed, however, into dangerous "femmes fatales". Eros, sexuality and femininity were variously interpreted by him as alluring danger. Life, love, and death can be determined as the important themes of Klimt's work. During the early years of the Secessionist movement, Klimt began incorporating gold leaf into his paintings, a development that would come to define the start of his so-called "Golden Phase". Pallas Athena (1898) is often considered to be the earliest piece from this period, with Judith I (1901) being another notable early example. The most iconic works of this period include Portrait of Adele Bloch-Bauer I (1907), The Kiss (1907–08), and the Stoclet Frieze (1905–1911). Klimt's golden phase was marked by positive critical reaction and financial success.

Klimt travelled all over Europe, mainly to present his works on the occasion of international exhibitions, but trips to Venice and Ravenna, both famous for their beautiful mosaics, most likely inspired his gold technique and his Byzantine imagery. In 1904, he collaborated with other artists on the lavish Stoclet Palace, the home of a wealthy Belgian industrialist that was one of the grandest monuments of the Art Nouveau age. Klimt's contributions to the dining room, including both Fulfillment and Expectation, were some of his finest decorative works, and as he publicly stated, "probably the ultimate stage of my development of ornament."

In 1905, Klimt painted The Three Ages of Woman, depicting the cycle of life. He painted a portrait of Margarete Wittgenstein, Ludwig Wittgenstein's sister, on the occasion of her marriage. Then, between 1907 and 1909, Klimt painted five canvases of society women wrapped in fur. His apparent love of costume is expressed in the many photographs of Flöge modelling clothing he had designed.

When he worked and relaxed in his home, Klimt normally wore sandals and a long robe with no undergarments. His simple life was somewhat cloistered, devoted to his art, family, and little else except the Secessionist Movement from which he and many colleagues eventually resigned. He avoided café society and seldom socialised with other artists. Klimt's fame usually brought patrons to his door, and he could afford to be highly selective. His painting method was very deliberate and painstaking at times, and he required lengthy sittings by his subjects. Although active sexually, he kept his affairs discreet, and he avoided personal scandal.

The artist cultivated close relationships with some of his clients, who were primarily from the assimilated Jewish Viennese Haute bourgeoisie. He cultivated intimate relationships, especially with his models from upper-class circles. He was considered progressive for his time, because he allowed women an active role in sexuality.

Klimt wrote little about his vision or his methods. He wrote mostly postcards to Flöge and kept no diary. In a rare writing called "Commentary on a non-existent self-portrait", he states, "I have never painted a self-portrait. I am less interested in myself as a subject for a painting than I am in other people, above all women.... There is nothing special about me. I am a painter who paints day after day from morning to night.... Whoever wants to know something about me ... ought to look carefully at my pictures."

In 1901, Hermann Bahr wrote, in his Speech on Klimt: "Just as only a lover can reveal to a man what life means to him and develop its innermost significance, I feel the same about these paintings."

=== Final years and death ===
In 1911, Klimt's painting Death and Life received first prize in the world exhibitions in Rome. He later reworked it in 1915, including changing the background from gold to blue. In 1915 Klimt's mother, Anna, died.

On 11 January 1918, Klimt suffered a stroke that paralysed his right side and required hospitalisation. While hospitalised, he died in Vienna on 6 February from pneumonia brought about by an early case of the Spanish flu, aged 55. He was buried at the Hietzing Cemetery in Hietzing, Vienna. Numerous paintings by him were left unfinished.

== Folios ==
=== Gustav Klimt: Das Werk ===
Das Werk von Gustav Klimt (English: The Work of Gustav Klimt) was the only monographic publication of Klimt's work issued during his lifetime. The completed portfolio was published in 1918 by Viennese publisher Hugo Heller, a close friend of Klimt's, and is sometimes referred to as the "Heller Portfolio". It consisted of fifty collotype reproductions of Klimt's paintings.

The project originated in 1908 at Galerie Miethke, headed by Carl Moll, which served as Klimt's exclusive agent. Following the Kunstschau Wien of 1908, the gallery produced a portfolio to promote Klimt's work internationally, to be issued in five instalments of ten plates each between 1908 and 1914. Klimt was closely involved in selecting the works and approving the quality of the reproductions. The plates were printed by the Imperial-Royal Court and State Press, mostly on Chinese paper mounted on handmade cardboard. However, the fifth instalment was never produced, and the Miethke project remained incomplete.

In 1917, Hugo Heller acquired the publishing rights and remaining material from the estate of Galerie Miethke to produce a new edition of the portfolio. It was published in 1918 as Das Werk von Gustav Klimt and included introductory essays by Hermann Bahr and Peter Altenberg. A total of 300 copies were issued, including 70 deluxe copies with facsimile signatures and original drawings by Klimt, and 230 numbered standard copies issued without them. The prints were released in five instalments of ten sheets each, with some printed on Chinese paper and mounted on handmade paper. Each sheet bears a unique gold signet, all of which were designed by Klimt between 1908 and 1914. Ten sheets were printed in colour and enhanced with gold and silver. Many copies of the portfolio were later lost or dispersed following Heller's bankruptcy and Klimt's death shortly after the project's completion. Emperor Franz Joseph I of Austria was the first to purchase a copy of the portfolio, and the American architect Frank Lloyd Wright also owned one. Several complete portfolios survive in private collections.

=== Fünfundzwanzig Handzeichnungen – "Twenty-five Drawings" ===
Fünfundzwanzig Handzeichnungen ('Twenty-five Drawings') was released the year after Klimt's death. Many of the drawings in the collection were erotic in nature and just as polarising as his painted works. Published in Vienna in 1919 by Gilhofer & Ranschburg, the edition of 500 features twenty-five monochrome and two-colour collotype reproductions, nearly indistinguishable from the original works. While the set was released a year after Klimt's death, some art historians suspect he was involved with production planning because of the meticulous nature of the printing (Klimt had overseen the production of the plates for Das Werk Gustav Klimts, making sure each one was to his exact specifications, a level of quality carried through similarly in Fünfundzwanzig Handzeichnungen). The first ten editions also each contained an original Klimt drawing.

Many of the works contained in this volume depict erotic scenes of nude women, some of whom are masturbating alone or are coupled in sapphic embraces. When a number of the original drawings were exhibited to the public, at Galerie Miethke in 1910 and the International Exhibition of Prints and Drawings in Vienna in 1913, they were met by critics and viewers who were hostile towards Klimt's contemporary perspective. There was an audience for Klimt's erotic drawings, however, and fifteen of his drawings were selected by Viennese poet Franz Blei for his translation of Hellenistic satirist Lucian's Dialogues of the Courtesans. The book, limited to 450 copies, provided Klimt with the opportunity to show these more lurid depictions of women and avoided censorship thanks to an audience composed of a small group of (mostly male) affluent patrons.

=== Gustav Klimt An Aftermath ===
Composed in 1931 by editor Max Eisler and printed by the Austrian State Printing Office, Gustav Klimt An Aftermath was intended to complete the lifetime folio Das Werk Gustav Klimts. The folio contains thirty coloured collotypes (fourteen of which are multi-coloured) and follows a similar format found in Das Werk Gustav Klimts, replacing the unique Klimt-designed signets with gold-debossed plate numbers. One hundred and fifty sets were produced in English, with twenty of them (Nos. I–XX) presented as a "gala edition" bound in gilt leather. The set contains detailed images from previously released works (Hygeia from the University Mural Medicine, 1901; a section of the third University Mural Jurisprudence, 1903), as well as the unfinished paintings (Adam and Eve, Bridal Progress).

== Selected works ==
=== Paintings ===
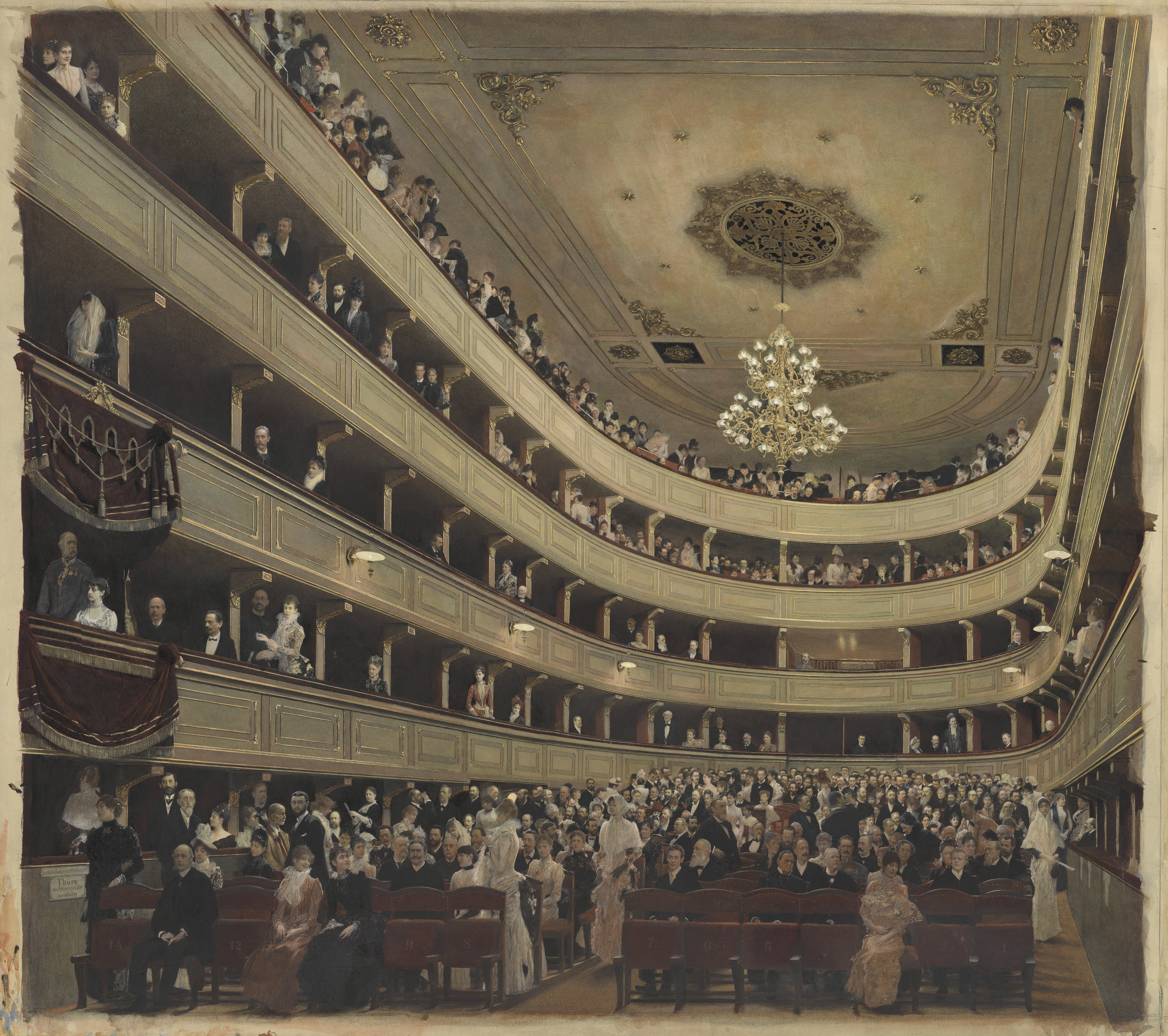
Auditorium of the Old Burgtheater, 1888–1889, Vienna Museum

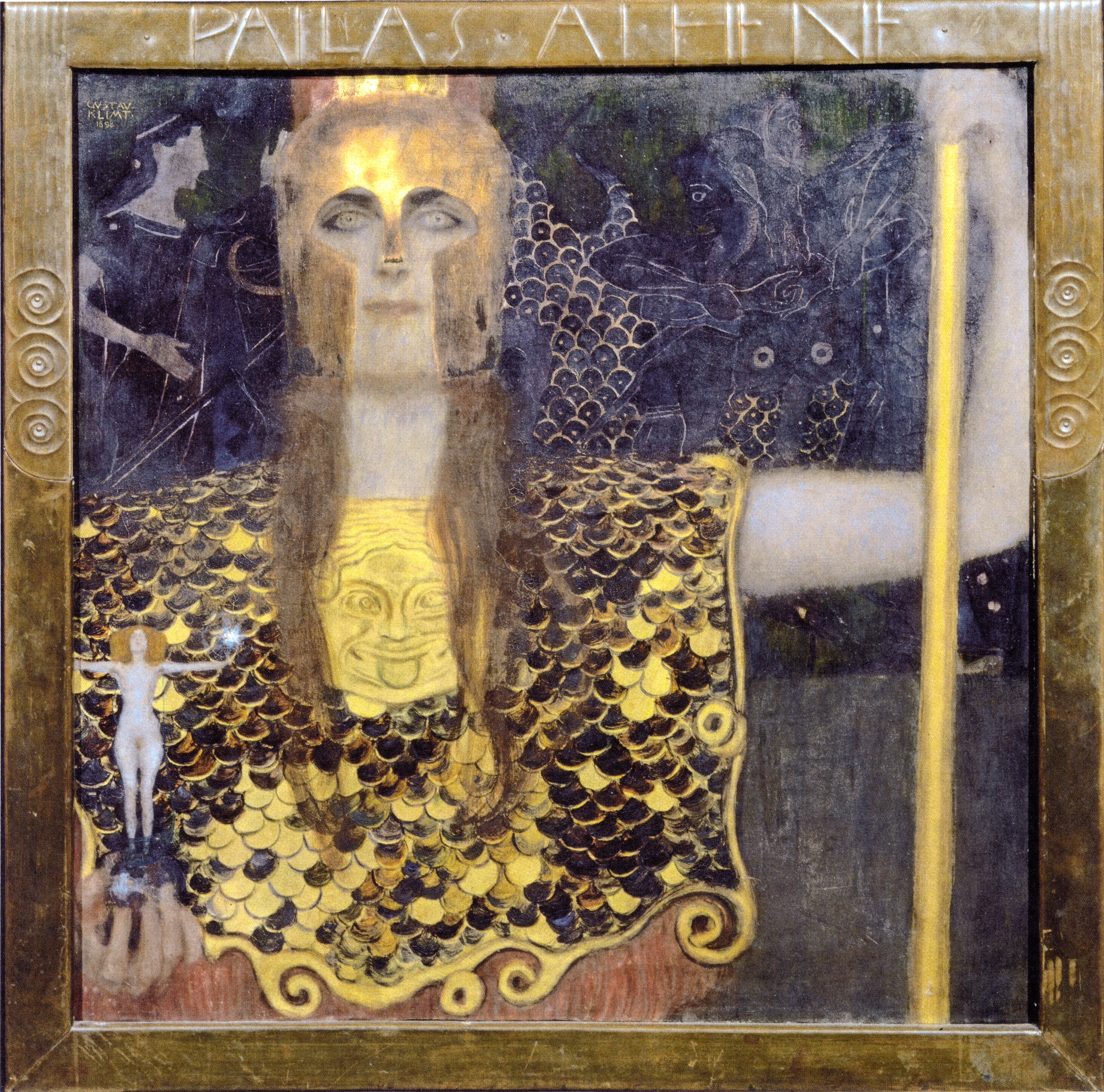
Pallas Athena, 1898, Vienna Museum

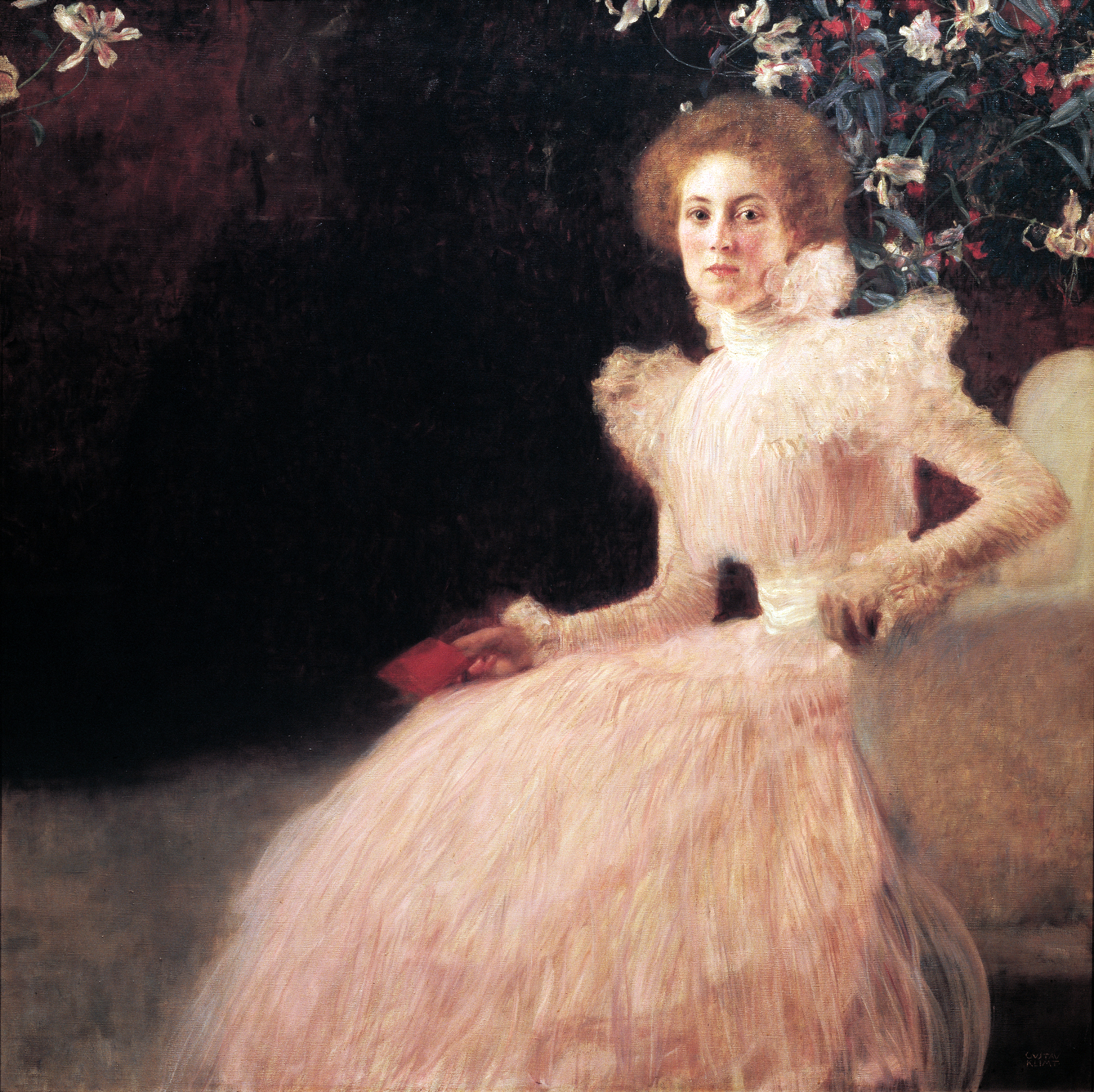
Portrait of Sonja Knips, 1898, Belvedere

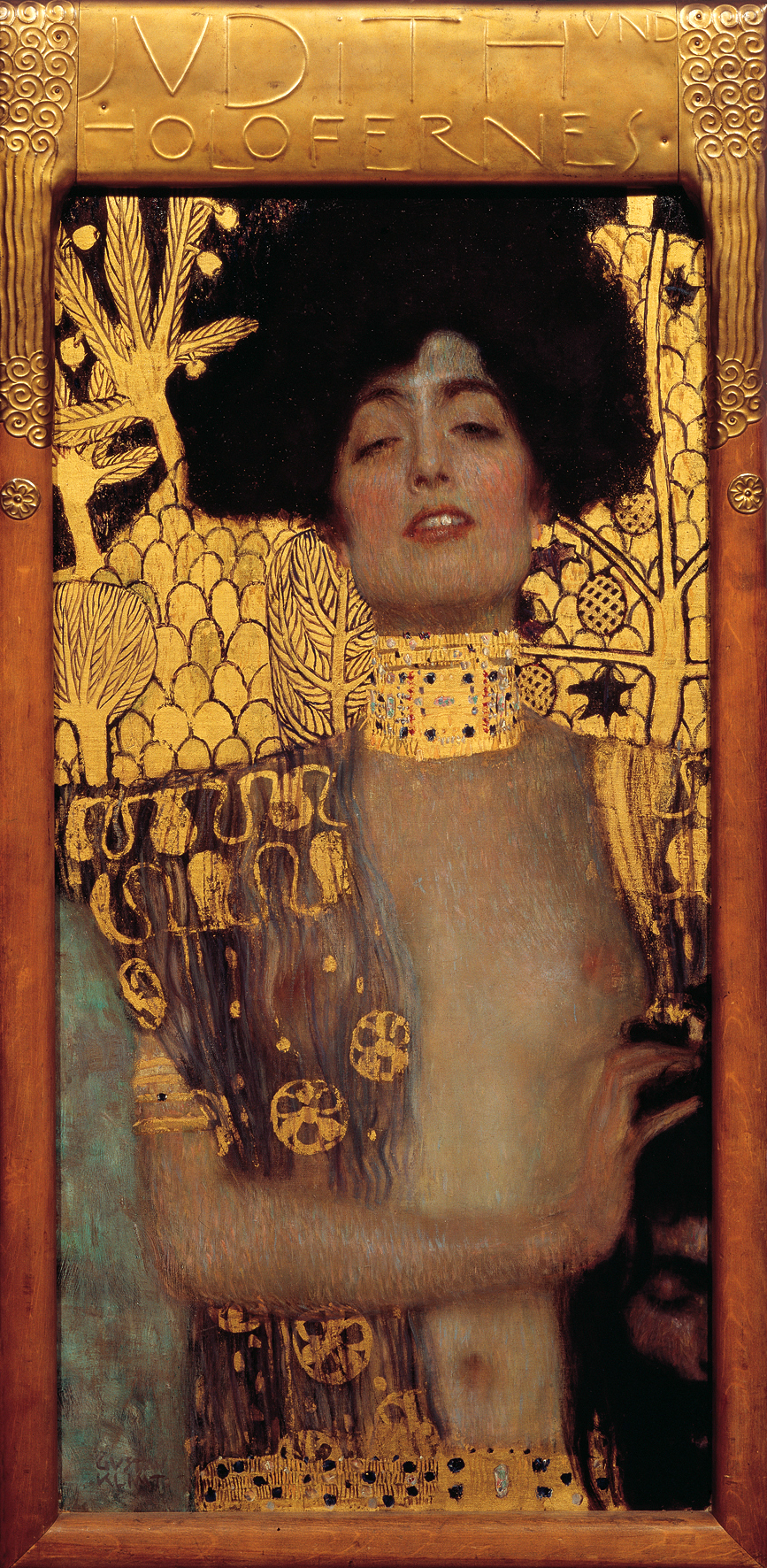
Judith I, 1901, Belvedere

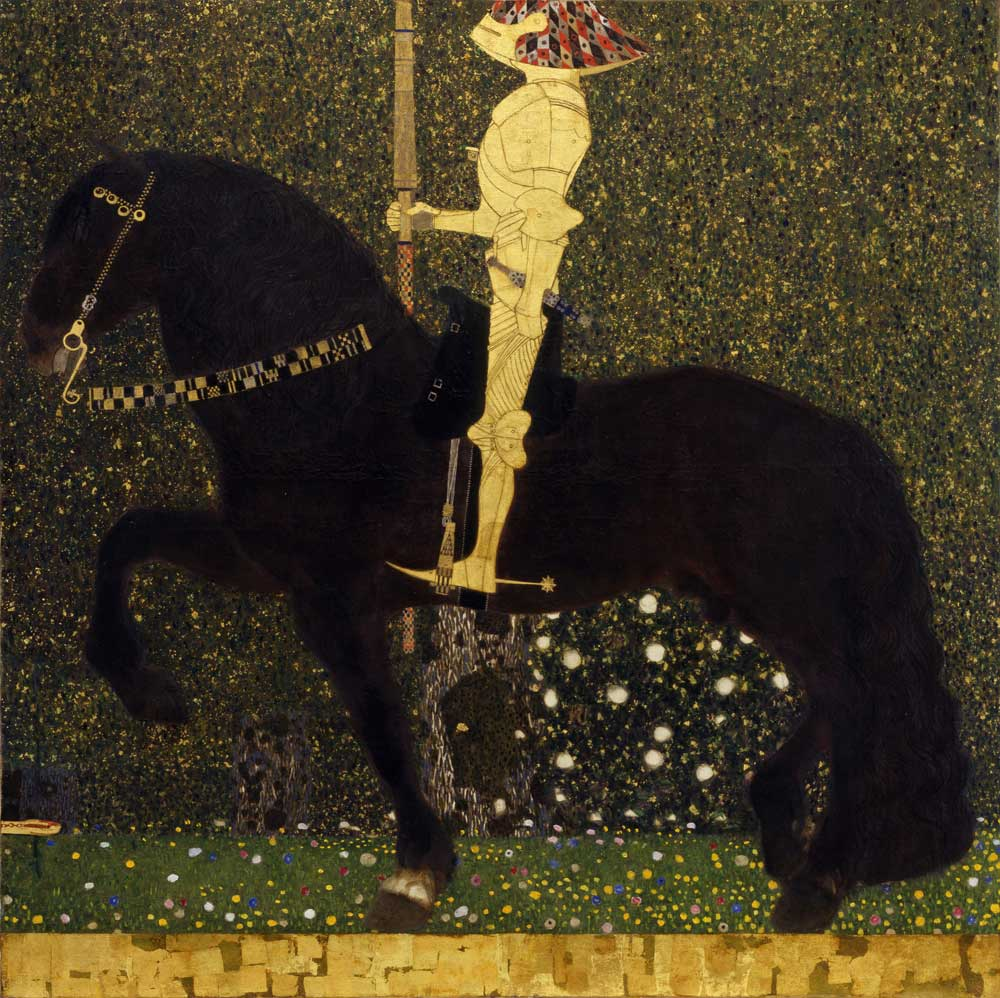
Life is a Struggle (Golden Rider), 1903, Aichi Prefectural Museum of Art

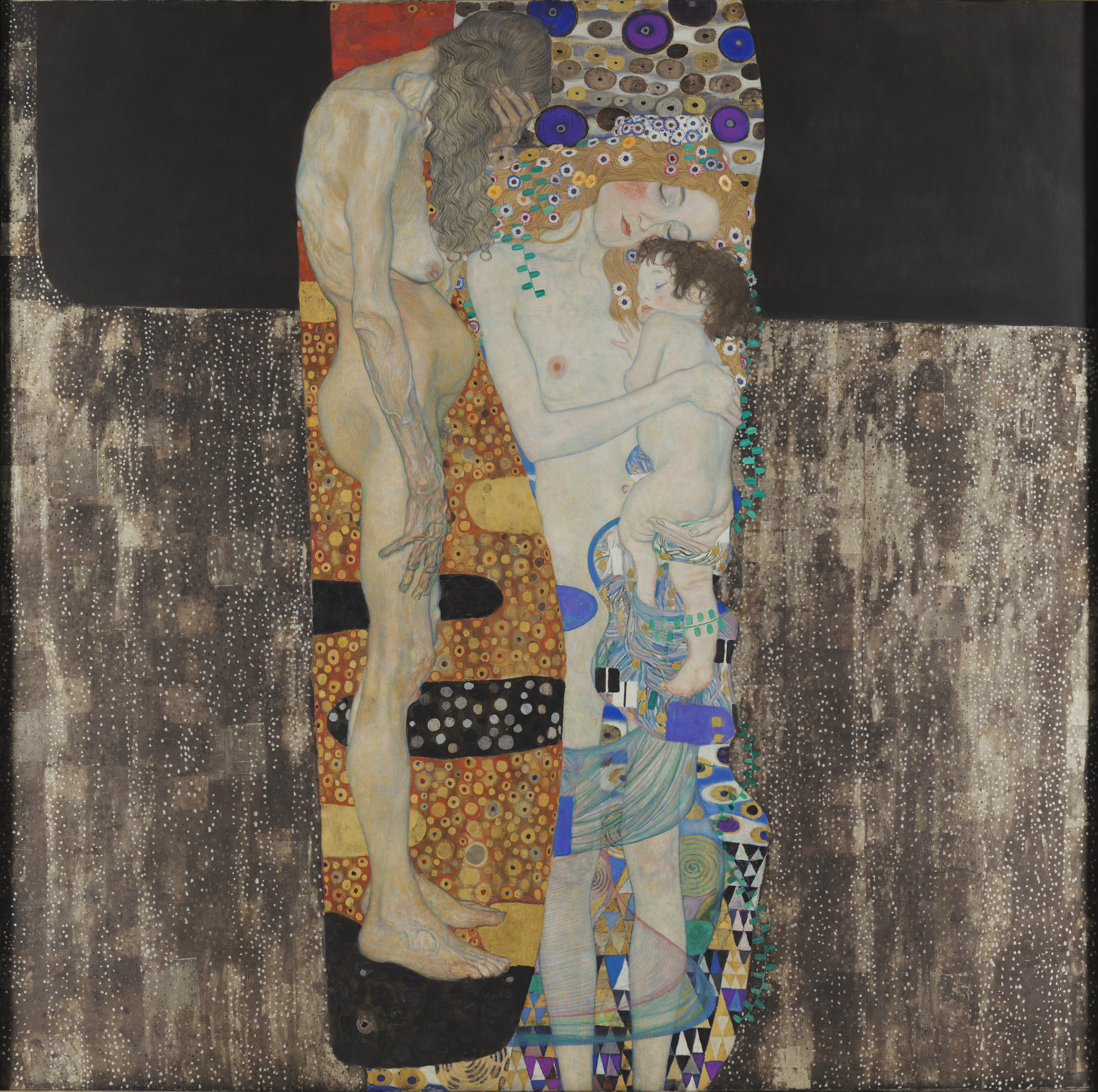
The Three Ages of Woman 1905, Galleria Nazionale d'Arte Moderna

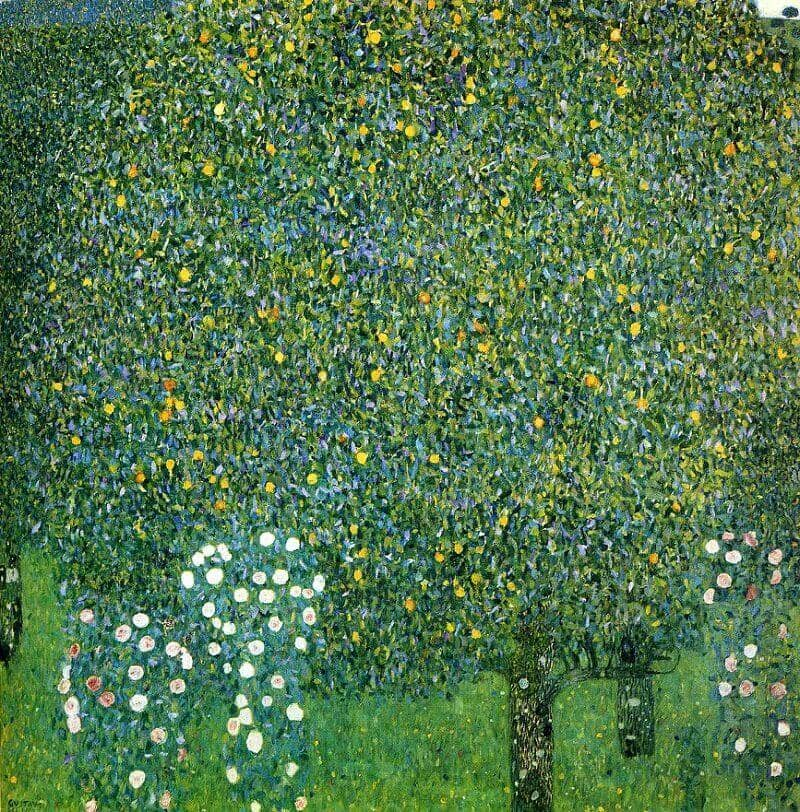
Rose Bushes under the Trees, c. 1905, private collection

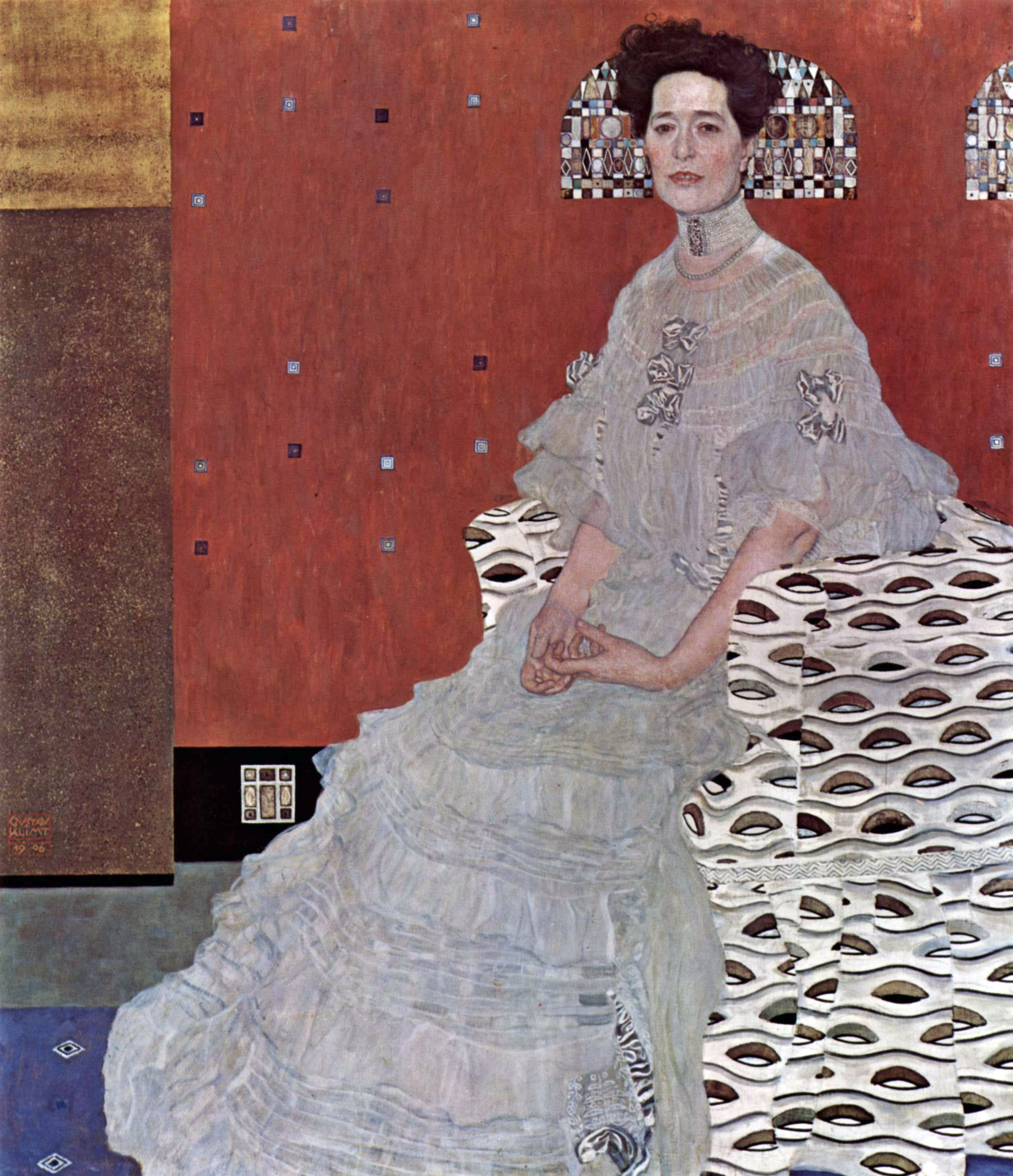
Portrait of Fritza Riedler, 1906, Belvedere

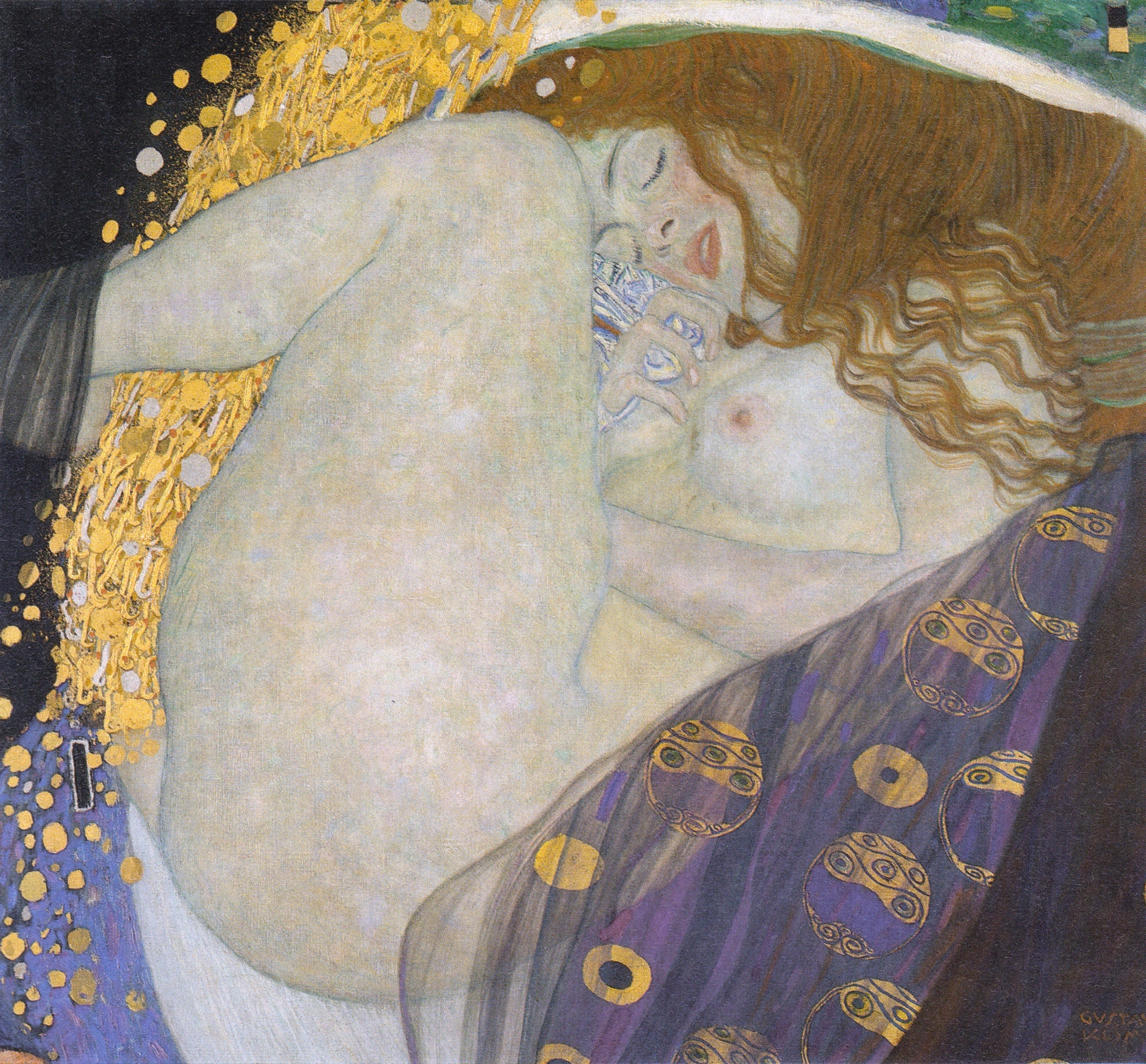
Danaë, 1907, private collection

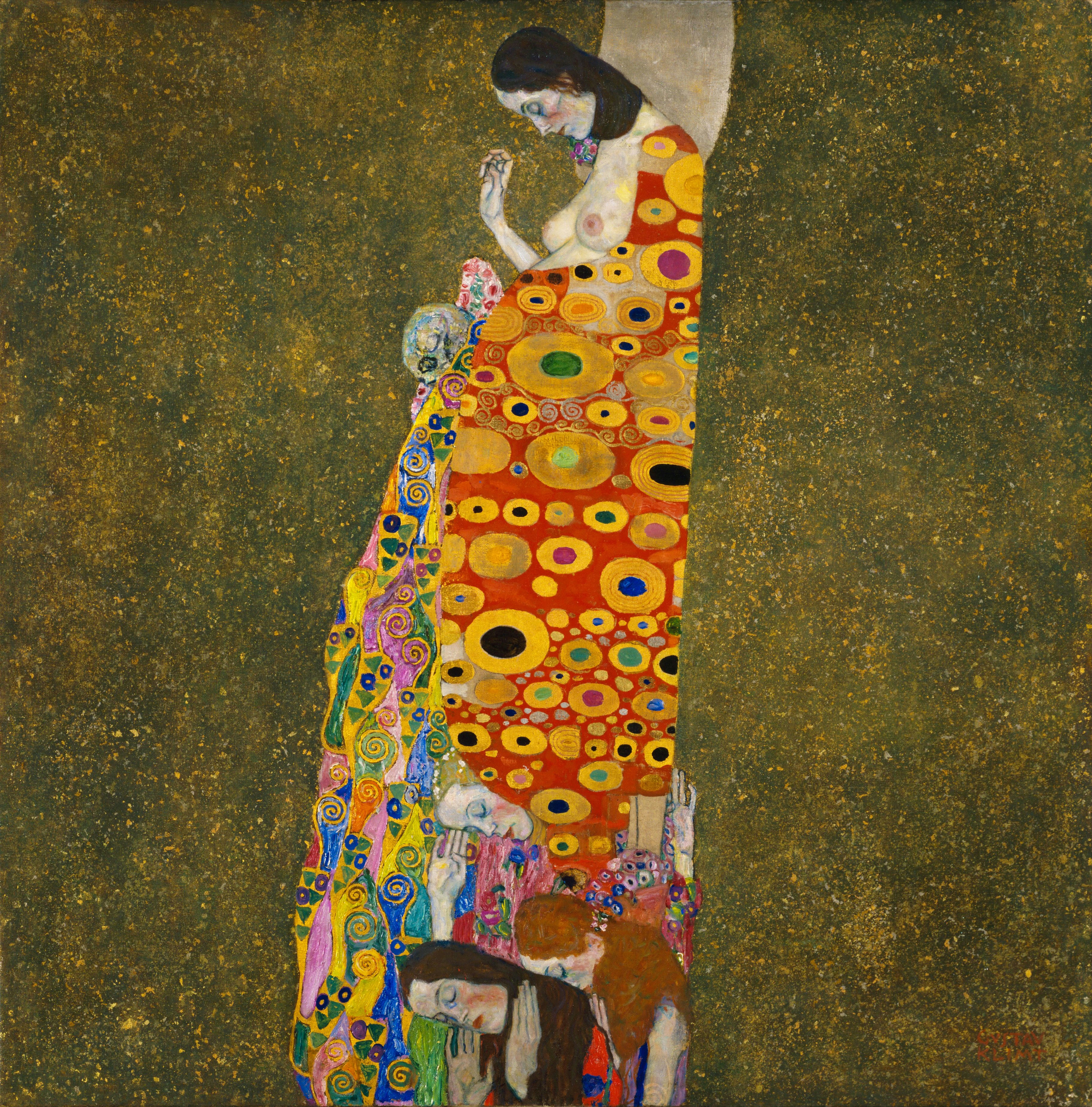
Hope II, 1907–08, Museum of Modern Art

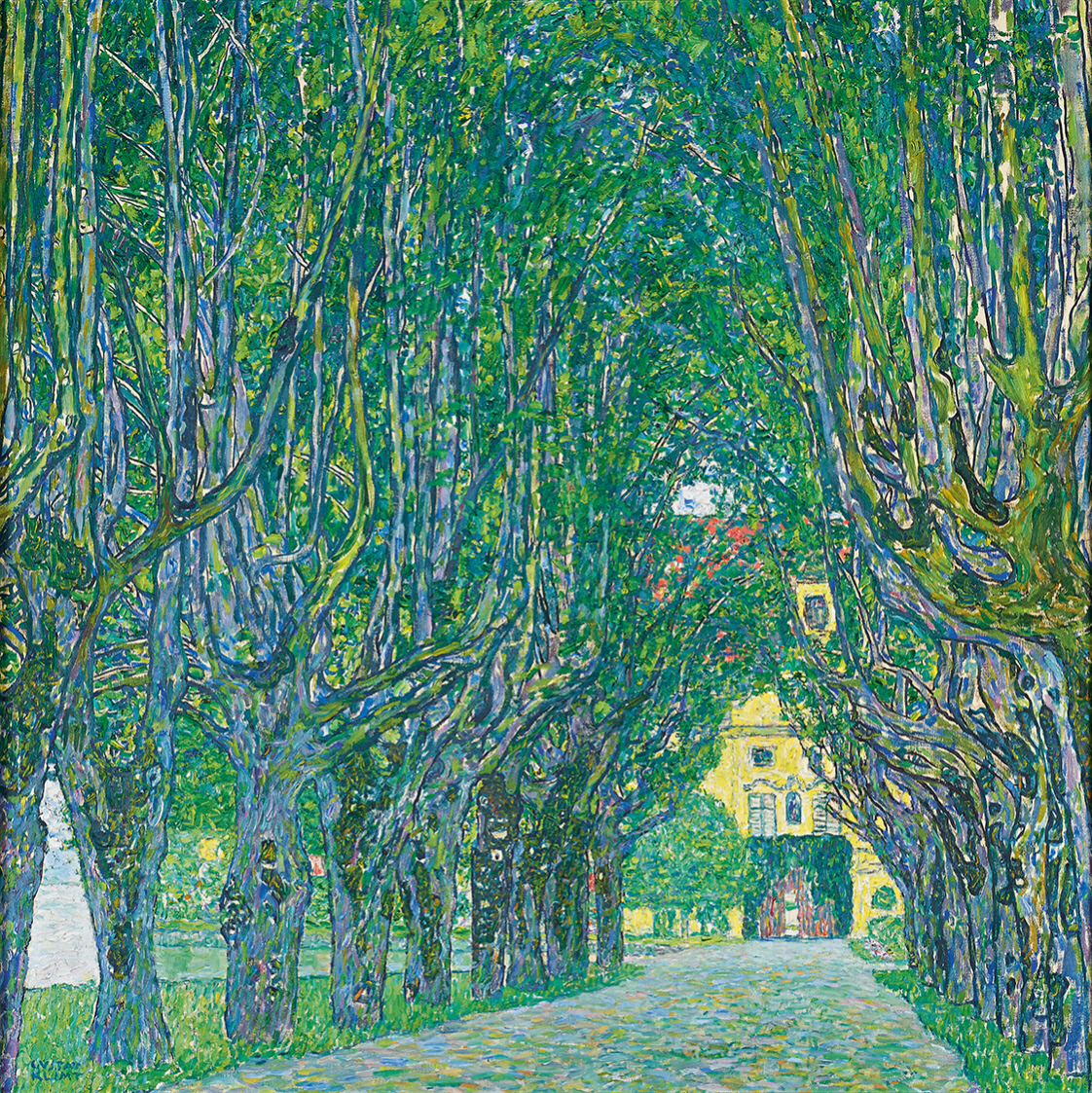
Avenue in Schloss Kammer Park, 1912, Belvedere

The Maiden, 1913, National Gallery Prague

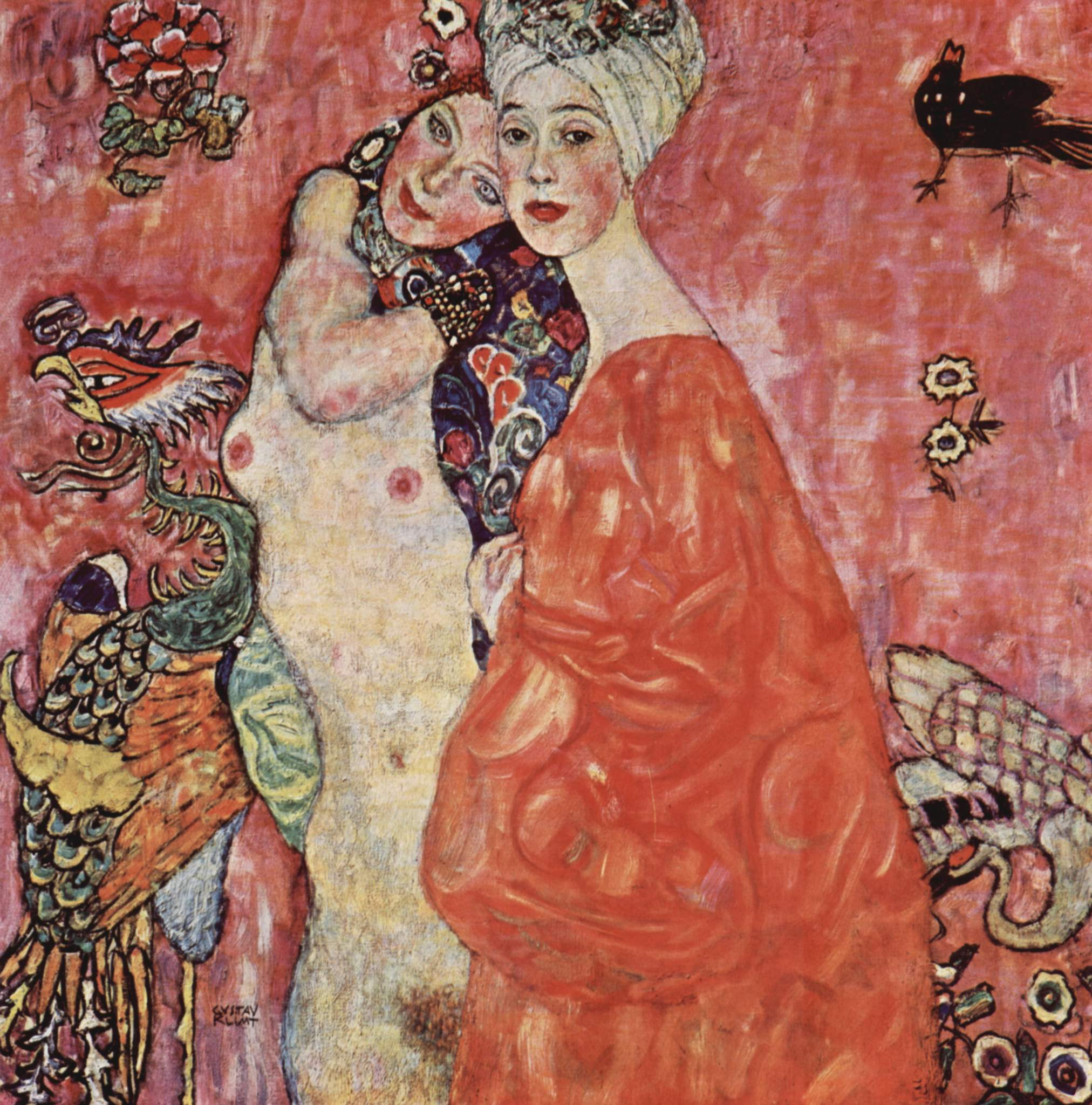
Women Friends or Girlfriends II, 1916–17, destroyed in 1945

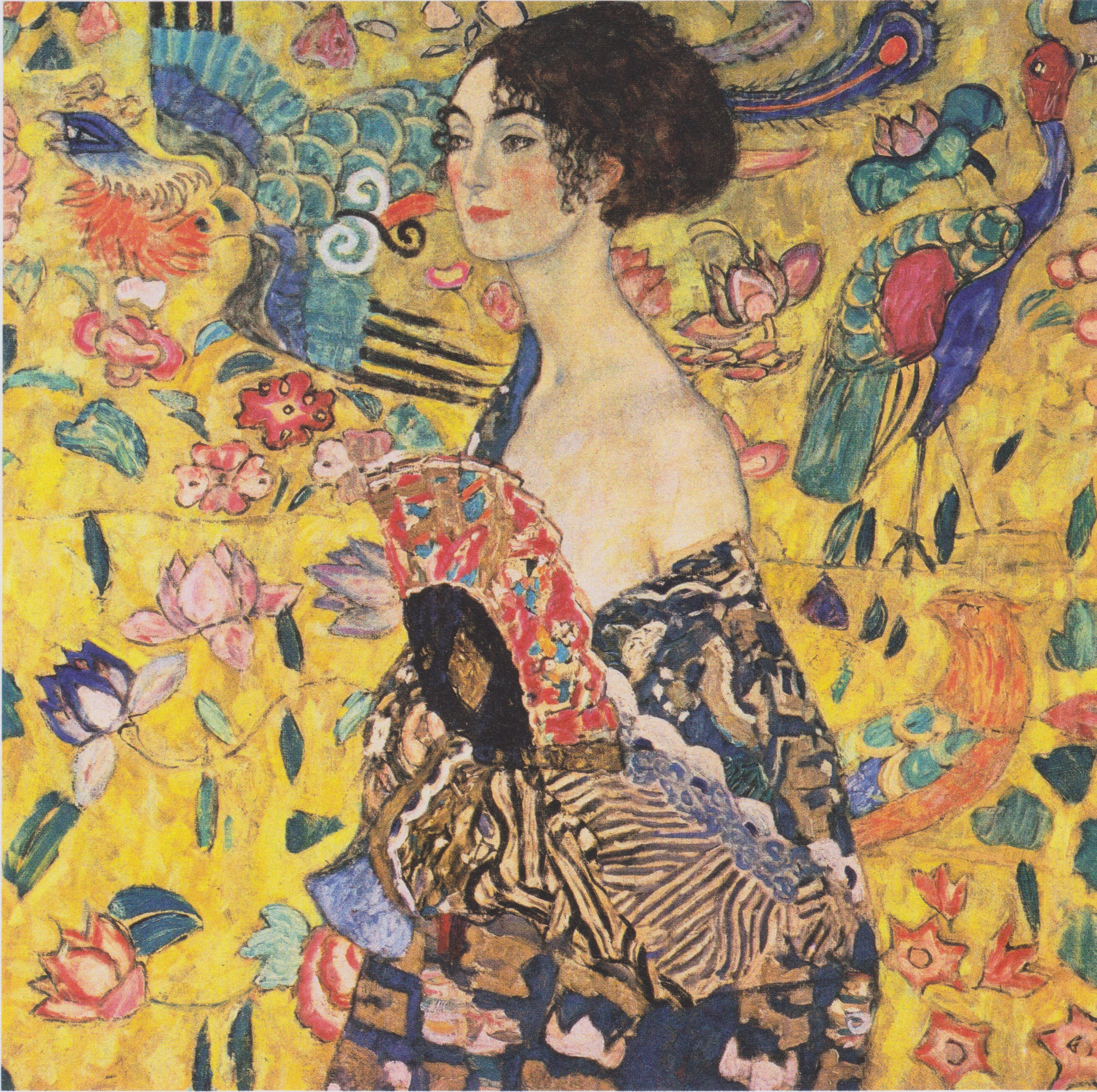
Lady with a Fan, c. 1917 – c. 1918

=== Drawings ===
In 1963, the Albertina museum in Vienna began researching the drawings of Gustav Klimt. The research project Gustav Klimt. Die Zeichnungen, has since been associated with intensive exhibition and publication activities.

Between 1980 and 1984 Alice Strobl published the three-volume catalogue raisonné, which records and describes all drawings by Gustav Klimt known at the time in chronological order. An additional supplementary volume was published in 1989. In the following year Strobl transferred her work to the art historian and curator Marian Bisanz-Prakken, who had assisted her since 1975 in the determination and classification of the works and who continues the research project to this day. Since 1990, Bisanz-Prakken has redefined, documented, and scientifically processed around 400 further drawings.

This makes the Albertina Vienna the only institution in the world that has been examining and scientifically classifying the artist's works for half a century. The research project now includes information on over 4,300 works by Gustav Klimt.

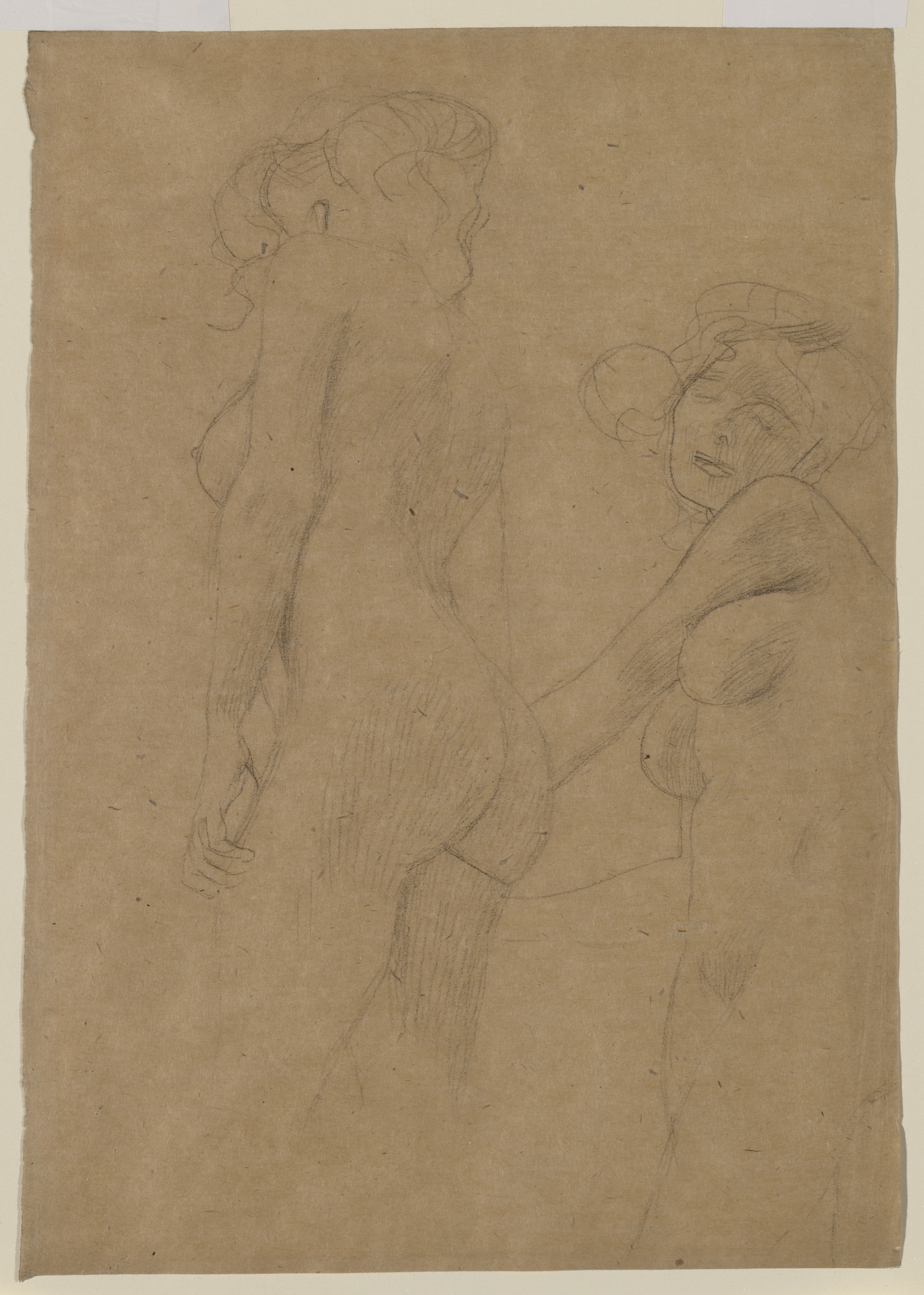
Two Female Nudes Standing, c. 1900, Solomon R. Guggenheim Museum

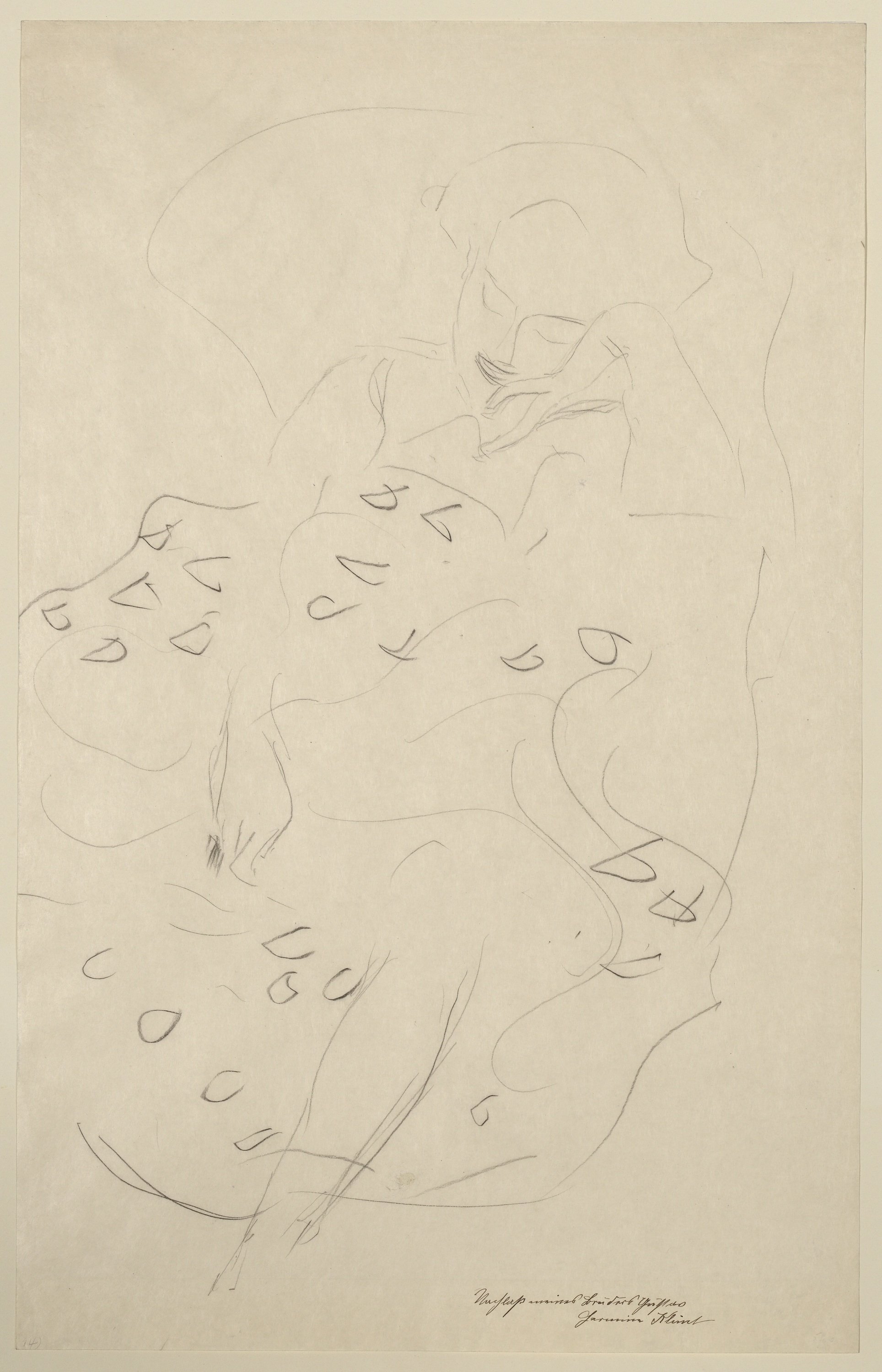
Girl Seated in a Chair, 1904, Solomon R. Guggenheim Museum

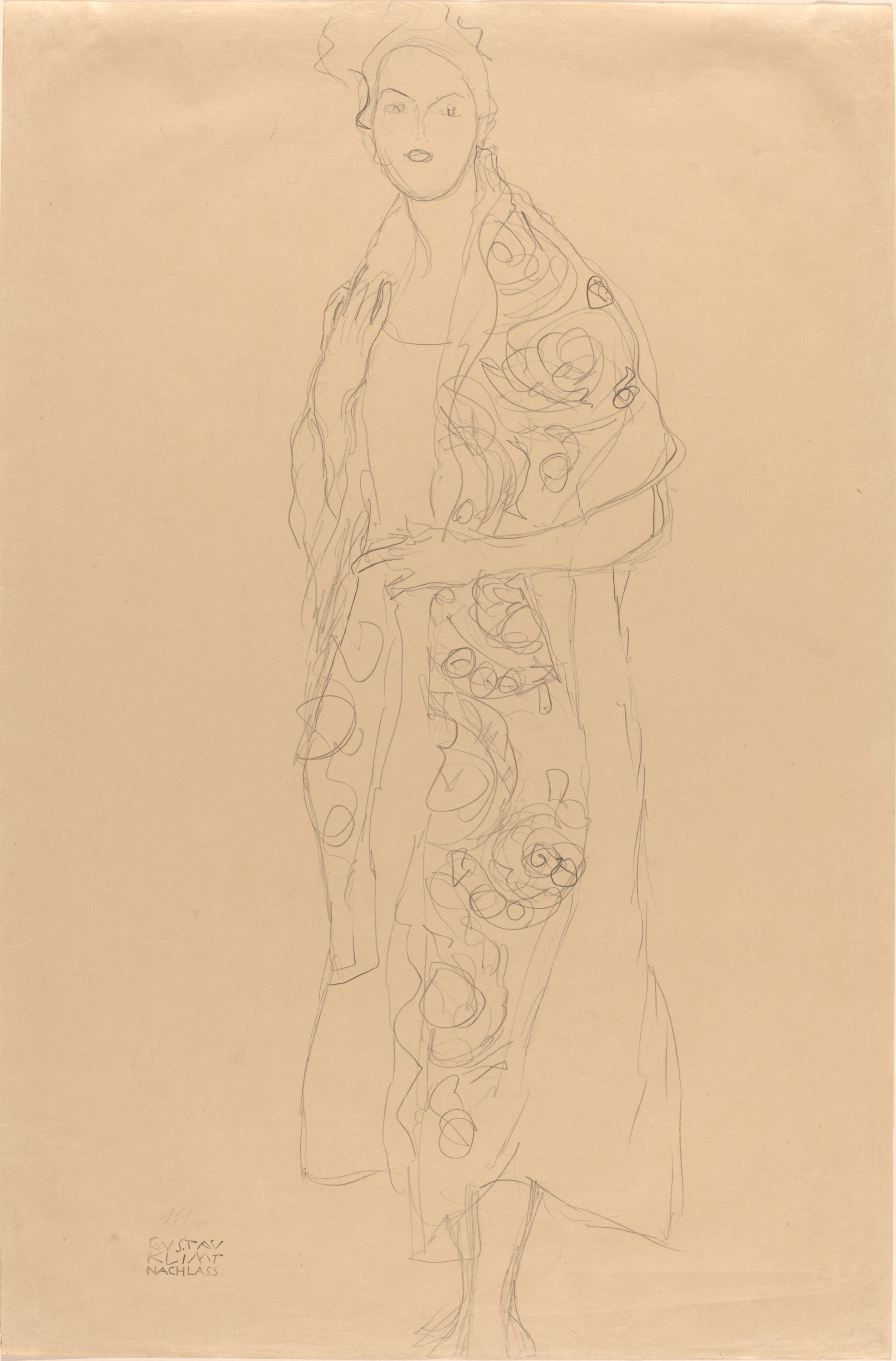
Portrait of a Woman, c. 1910, National Gallery of Art Washington

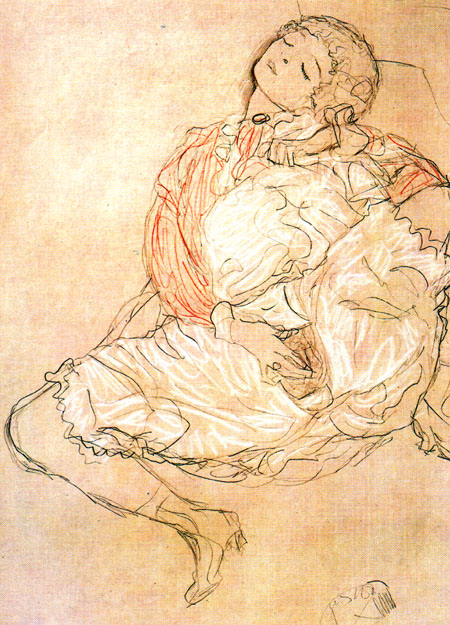
Seated woman masturbating, 1913

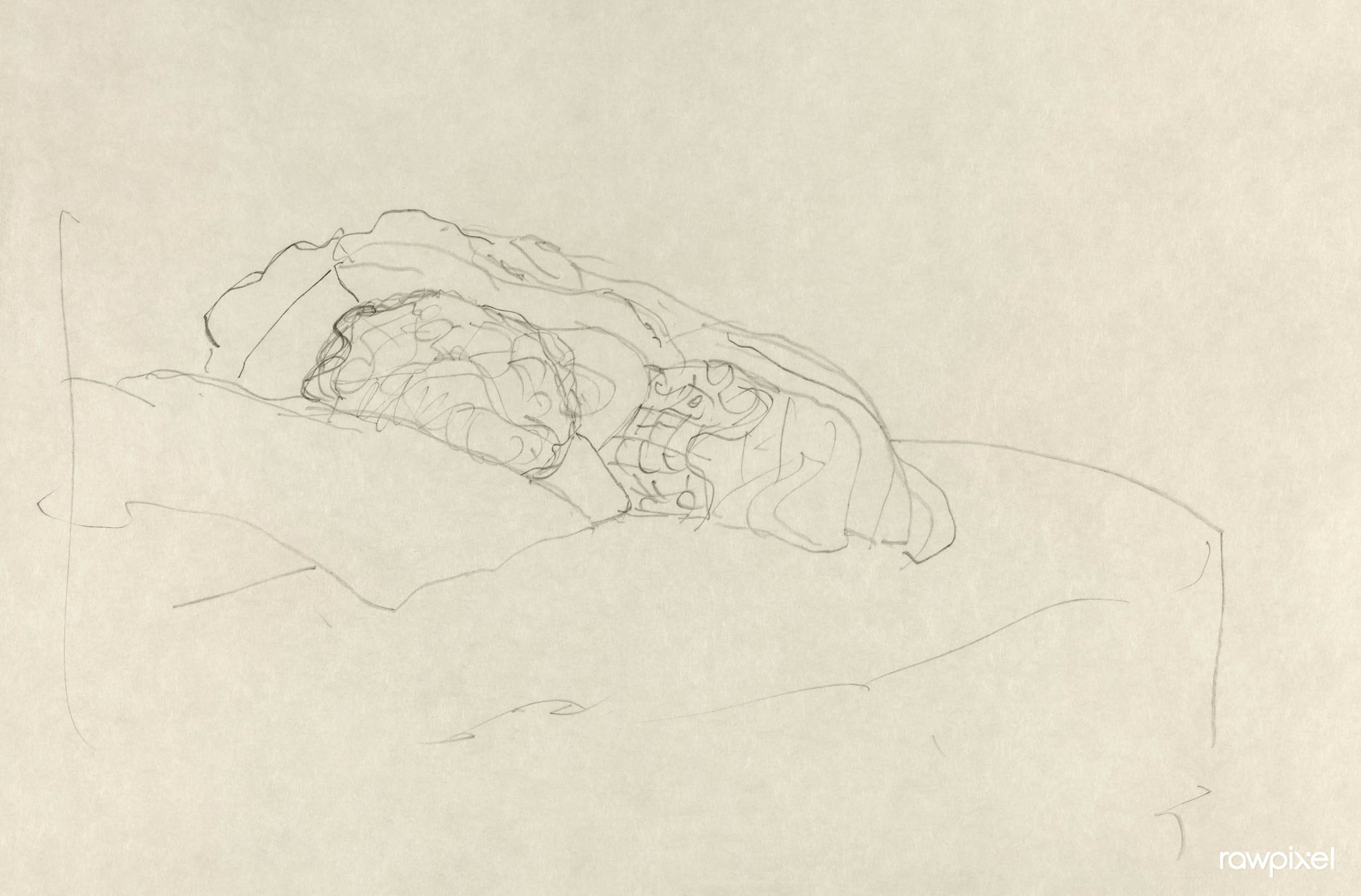
Curled up Girl on Bed, c. 1916 – c. 1917, National Gallery of Art Washington

== Legacy ==
=== Artistic influence and reception ===
During his lifetime, Klimt influenced other artists, such as the Italian Liberty style artist Galileo Chini (1873–1956) and the Italian artist Vittorio Zecchin (1878–1947). Klimt was exhibited at the 1910 Venice Biennale, with his exhibition influencing the artistic environment within Venice. Within this context, Zecchin created in 1914 the decorative panel cycle Le Mille e una Notte ("One Thousand and One Nights") for the dining room of the Hotel Terminus in Venice. The cycle of twelve paintings, now dismembered, is considered one of the greatest Art Nouveau masterpieces in Venice. Six panels are held by the Ca' Pesaro art museum. In the same year, Chini created a cycle of decorative panels entitled La Primavera ("Spring") to host the works of the Croatian sculptor Ivan Meštrović (1883–1962) at the 1914 Venice Biennale.

Klimt's work had a clear influence on the paintings of Egon Schiele. In 1917, Schiele developed the idea of establishing a new artist association, the Kunsthalle (Hall of Art), to help rebuild the arts after the First World War. Klimt, and other contemporaries, greatly supported the idea, however it failed due to lack of funding. Artists who reinterpreted Klimt's work include Slovak artist Rudolf Fila (1932–2015).

According to the writer Frank Whitford: "Klimt of course, is an important artist—he's a very popular artist—but in terms of the history of art, he's a very unimportant artist. Although he sums up so much in his work, about the society in which he found himself—in art historical terms his effect was negligible. So he's an artist really in a cul-de-sac."

=== Posthumous auction history ===
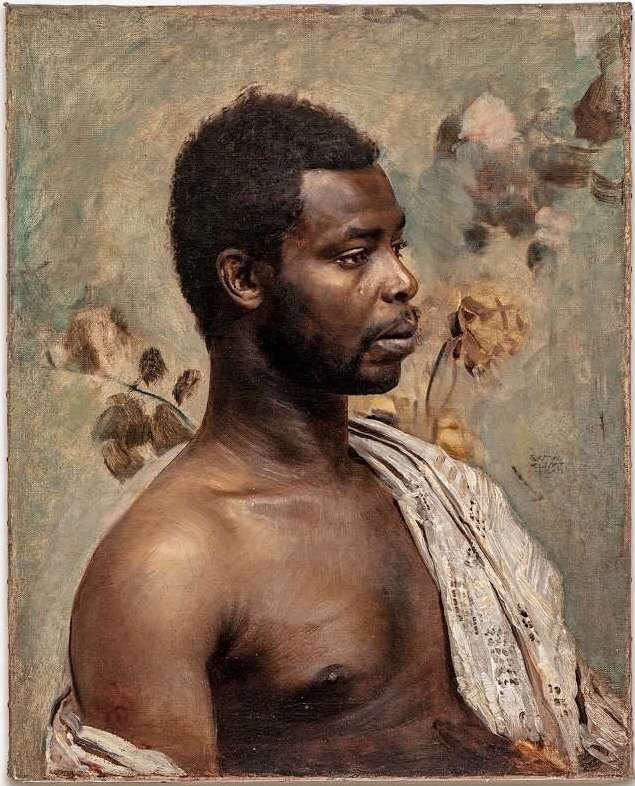
Prince William Nil Nortey Dowuona (1897)

Klimt's paintings have brought some of the highest prices recorded for individual works of art. Although original paintings by Klimt rarely appear at auction and typically sell for millions of US dollars, his works on paper appear on the art market much more frequently, and often sell for under US$100,000. As of February 2026, the art market database Artprice lists 81 auction entries for paintings, but 2,003 for drawings and watercolours. Reclining Female Nude Facing Left, drawn between 1914 and 1915, sold at Sotheby's in London for £505,250 in 2008, the highest price paid for a drawing by Klimt. However, the majority of the art trade traditionally takes place privately through galleries such as Wienerroither & Kohlbacher, which specialise in the trade with original works by Gustav Klimt and Egon Schiele and regularly present these at monographic exhibitions and international art fairs.

In November 2003, Klimt's Landhaus am Attersee sold for US$29,128,000. In 2006, the 1907 portrait, Adele Bloch-Bauer I, was purchased for the Neue Galerie New York by Ronald Lauder reportedly for US$135M, surpassing Picasso's 1905 Boy With a Pipe (sold 5 May 2004 for US$104M), as the highest reported price ever paid for a painting at that time.

On 7 August 2006, Christie's auction house announced it was handling the sale of the remaining four works by Klimt that were recovered by Maria Altmann and her co-heirs after their long legal battle against the state of Austria. The portrait of Adele Bloch-Bauer II was sold at auction in November 2006 for US$88M, the third-highest-priced piece of art at auction at the time. The Apple Tree I (c. 1912) sold for US$33M, Birch Forest (1903) sold for US$40.3M, and Houses in Unterach on the Attersee (1916) sold for US$31M. Collectively, the five restituted paintings netted more than US$327M. The painting Litzlberg am Attersee was auctioned for US$40.4M in November 2011.

Klimt's last portrait, Lady with a Fan (1918), was sold by Sotheby's in London on 27 June 2023 for £85.3M to a Hong Kong collector, becoming the highest-priced artwork ever sold at auction in Europe. Its sale surpassed Klimt's previous auction record of US$104.6M, achieved in November 2022 at the sale of Birch Forest (1903) by Christie's in New York.

In the early 2020s, Klimt's early portrait Prince William Nii Nortey Dowuona (1897), depicting an Osu prince from what is now Ghana, resurfaced when a couple brought a dirty, poorly framed canvas bearing Klimt's estate stamp to the Wienerroither & Kohlbacher gallery in Vienna, where it was authenticated by art historian Alfred Weidinger, author of the 2007 Klimt catalogue raisonné, as a long-lost work by the artist. The painting is believed to have remained in Klimt's studio until it was consigned from his estate to the Samuel Kende auction house in Vienna in 1923 with a starting price of 15,000 Austrian krones, and by 1928 it was recorded as the property of the Jewish collector Ernestine Klein, who, with her husband Felix, had converted Klimt's former studio into a villa before the couple fled Nazi Austria in 1938, after which the work was long considered lost. Following a restitution settlement with Klein's heirs, the cleaned and restored canvas was exhibited publicly at the TEFAF Maastricht art fair in March 2025 by Wienerroither & Kohlbacher with an asking price of €15M, and was widely discussed as an important link between Klimt's early naturalistic portraits and his later decorative style. The portrait was painted after Klimt and his colleague Franz von Matsch visited an 1897 Völkerschau (ethnographic "human zoo") at Vienna's Tiergarten am Schüttel, where Prince William Nii Nortey Dowuona was among some 120 members of the Osu community from the Gold Coast (modern Ghana) displayed to large daily crowds, a context that has prompted renewed critical attention to colonial-era racial exhibitions in Europe. In November 2025, prosecutors in Vienna ordered the painting seized at the request of Hungarian authorities, who alleged that it had been improperly exported from Hungary, adding an ongoing legal dispute over export and restitution law to its provenance history.

On 18 November 2025, Klimt's Portrait of Elisabeth Lederer (1914–1916), a full-length portrait of the daughter of his patrons August and Serena Lederer, was sold at Sotheby's in New York from the collection of cosmetics heir Leonard Lauder for US$236.4M after an approximately 20-minute bidding contest among multiple telephone bidders, far exceeding its pre-sale estimate of US$150M. The price set a new auction record for a work by Klimt. It was "a record for any work of art ever sold at Sotheby's", was the highest price ever paid for a work of modern art at auction, and it made the painting the second most expensive artwork sold at auction, behind Leonardo da Vinci's Salvator Mundi in 2017. In the lot from the same date, two more of Klimt's works were sold at prices that made them the 2nd (Blooming Meadow, US$86M) and 3rd (Forest Slope in Unterach on the Attersee, US$68.3M) highest priced art auction results of 2025.

=== Cultural legacy ===
In 1972 the Vienna State Opera presented a new production of Salome, an opera by Oscar Wilde and Richard Strauss, in a Klimt-inspired stage setting and costumes by Jürgen Rose. This production, directed by Boleslaw Barlog and first conducted by Karl Böhm, became extremely popular and stayed in the repertoire for nearly fifty years. It was shown in 265 performances and went on tour to Florence, Washington and twice in Japan.

In 2006 an Austrian art-house biographical film about Klimt's life, titled Klimt, was released with John Malkovich in the title role. The 2015 film Woman in Gold, starring Helen Mirren as Maria Altmann, dramatised the legal battle to reclaim five Klimt paintings, including Portrait of Adele Bloch-Bauer I that had been looted by the Nazis. The film was inspired by Stealing Klimt, a 2007 documentary featuring Maria Altmann herself. Other documentary films which prominently feature the legal battle include The Rape of Europa (2006) and Adele's Wish (2008).

In 2008, fashion designer John Galliano cited Klimt as one of his inspirations for the Christian Dior Spring–Summer 2008 haute couture collection, alongside John Singer Sargent's Portrait of Madame X. The 2013 collection of designer Alexander McQueen was also partially inspired by Klimt.

Gustav Klimt and his work have been the subjects of many collector coins such as the €100 Painting Gold Coin, issued by the Austrian Mint on 5 November 2003. The obverse depicts Klimt in his studio with two unfinished paintings on easels.

Tawny Chatmon, an US photographic artist known for her portraits of Black children overlaid with gold leaf and paint, has sought to place black figures in glittering gold clothing inspired by Klimt's lavish portraits of white Viennese women. Elements of the portrait of First Lady Michelle Obama, by Amy Sherald in 2018, have been noted by art critics to have been influenced by Klimt, in particular Portrait of Adele Bloch-Bauer I. One commentator noted the similarity to fashion designed by Klimt's muse Emilie Louise Flöge.

=== Commemoration of Klimt's 150th birthday ===
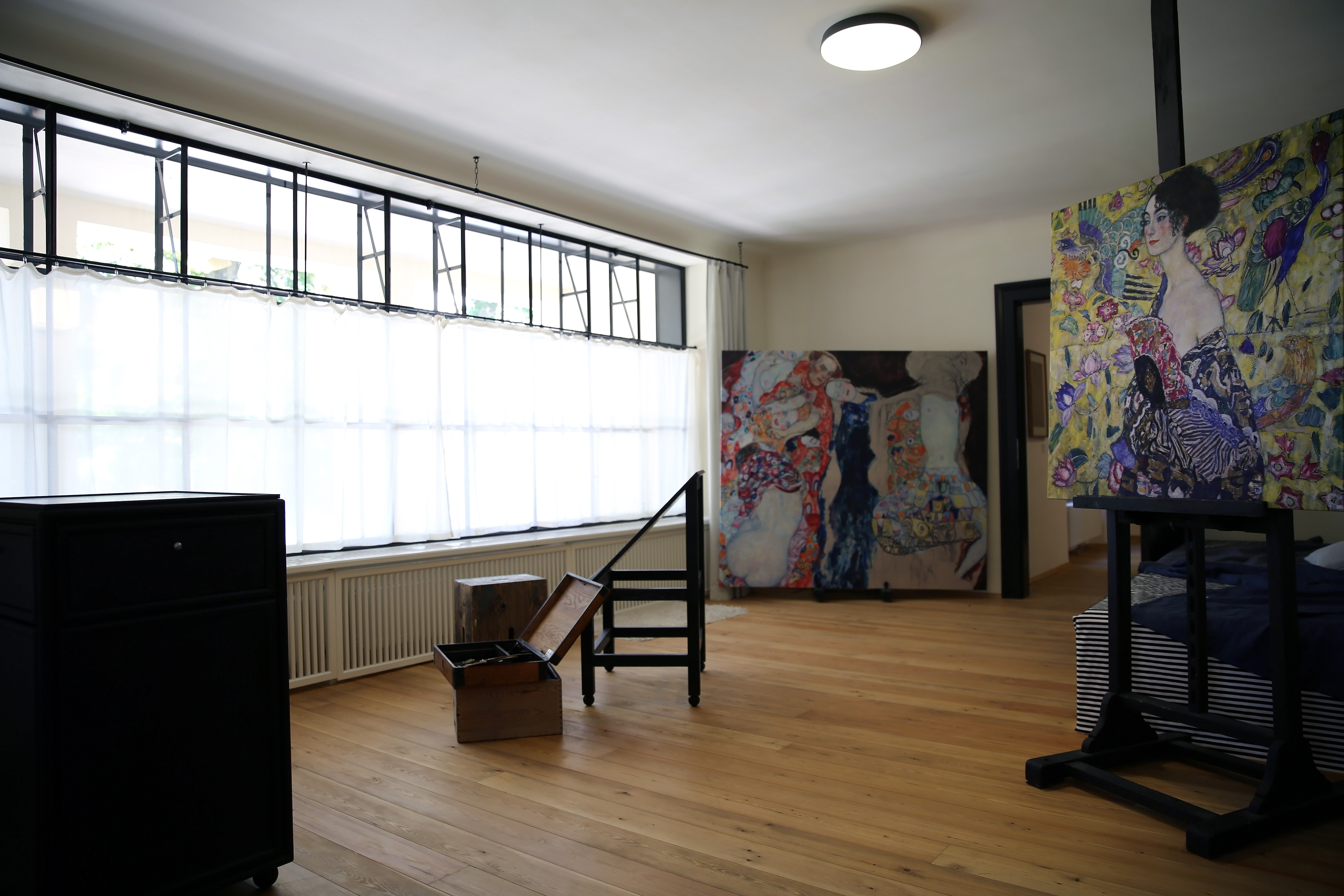
Klimt's reconstructed studio (2013) at the Klimt Villa. On display are copies of the paintings Woman with Fan and The Bride (both c. 1917–18)

In 2012, Vienna marked the 150th anniversary of Gustav Klimt's birth with a city-wide programme of exhibitions across at least ten venues, including major retrospectives at the Wien Museum, the Albertina, and the Leopold Museum. Other institutions such as the Belvedere, Kunsthistorisches Museum, Secession Building, Theatre Museum, MAK, and Künstlerhaus staged special displays ranging from comprehensive surveys of his paintings and drawings to focused presentations of his collaborations and early commissions. The anniversary year also saw the restoration and public opening of Klimt's last studio in Vienna and the inauguration of the Klimt-Zentrum at the Attersee, a centre offering exhibitions, conferences, and guided tours of the area. The Neue Galerie New York also held a "150th Anniversary Celebration" exhibition from May to August 2012, featuring paintings, drawings and rare photographs.

The Austrian Mint began a five-coin gold series called Klimt and His Women to coincide with the 150th anniversary of Klimt's birth. The first €50 gold coin was issued on 25 January 2012 and featured a portrait of Klimt on the obverse and a portion of his painting Adele Bloch-Bauer I. The 2013 issue, depicting details of the Stoclet Frieze, was awarded the 2015 Coin of the Year award. The series concluded in 2016 featuring Klimt's most famous work, The Kiss.

Austria issued a commemorative stamp on 14 July 2012, while San Marino released a souvenir sheet of stamps with a print run of 70,000. Google also marked the occasion on the same day with a Google Doodle depicting Klimt's The Kiss.

=== Gustav Klimt Foundation ===
The Gustav Klimt Foundation was established in 2013 by Ursula Ucicky, widow of Klimt's illegitimate son Gustav Ucicky, with a mission to "preserve and disseminate Gustav Klimt's legacy." The managing director of the Leopold Museum, Peter Weinhäupl, was appointed as chairman of the foundation. As a reaction, the museum's director Tobias G. Natter resigned in protest, citing Ucicky's past as a Nazi propaganda filmmaker. Of the foundation's owned four paintings and ten drawings by Klimt, the provenance of only one painting, Portrait of Gertrude Loew, was disputed. In 2015, the painting and five drawings were restituted and later auctioned, with the proceeds shared between the heirs and the foundation. In 2022, the foundation launched the Gustav Klimt Database, an open-access online research portal documenting Klimt's works, personal documents, photographs, and life within the socio-political context of Vienna around 1900.

=== Nazi-looted art and restitution ===
Many of Klimt's works were looted by the Nazis in World War II, and several were destroyed.

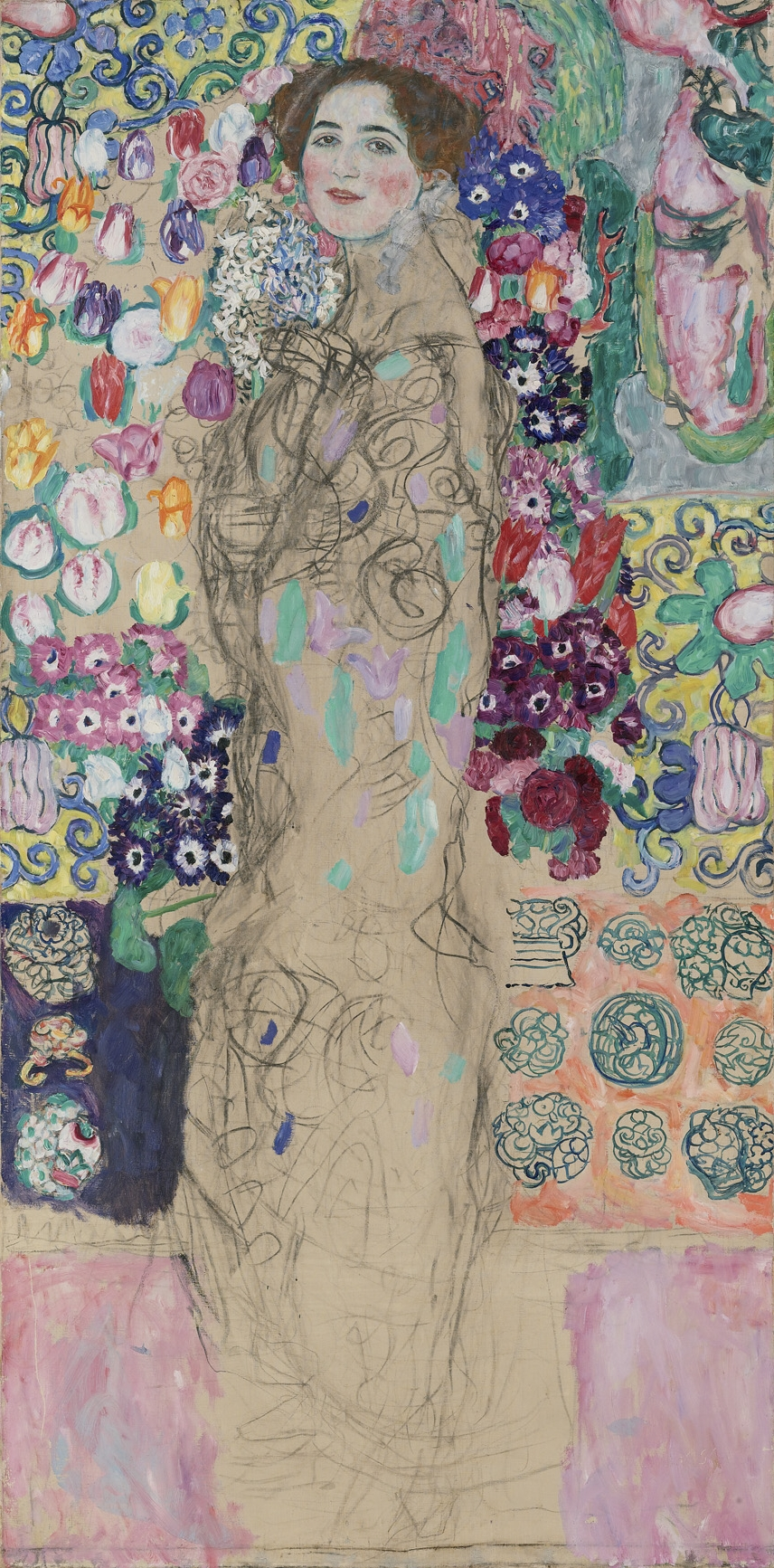
Portrait of Ria Munk III (unfinished) (c. 1917 – c. 1918)

In 2000, a government committee recommended that Klimt's Lady with Hat and Feather Boa, in Belvedere Museum in Vienna, be restituted to the heirs of the Jewish family that had owned it before the Nazi Anschluss.

National Public Radio reported on 17 January 2006 that "The Austrian National Gallery is being compelled by a national arbitration board to return five paintings by Gustav Klimt to a Los Angeles-based woman, the heir of a Jewish family that had its art stolen by the Nazis. The paintings are estimated to be worth at least US$150M." Later that year, the most notable of the five paintings, 1907's Portrait of Adele Bloch-Bauer I (also known as "The Woman in Gold"), was sold for US$135M (at the time, the highest price ever paid for a single painting) to art collector Ronald Lauder, founder of Neue Galerie New York, where it remains on display.

In 2009 the Lentos Art Museum in Linz restituted Klimt's Portrait of Ria Munk III (Frauenbildnis) to the heirs of Aranka Munk, a Jewish art collector in Vienna who was murdered in The Holocaust. The looted portrait was of her daughter.

In 2021 the French minister of culture announced that the only Klimt in France's national collections was Nazi loot which should be restituted to the heirs of the Jewish family that had been persecuted by Nazis. Rosebushes Under the Trees, painted in 1905, had been owned by Nora Stiasny, who had been forced to sell it before being murdered by the Nazis. It is currently hanging in France's Musée d'Orsay, which purchased it from Swiss art dealer Peter Nathan in 1980. A similar painting by Klimt known as Apple Trees II, which was also Nazi loot, was mistakenly returned to the wrong family by the Austrian authorities, and subsequently sold. As of 2018, its ownership was still in dispute.

In 2023, Ronald Lauder agreed to restitute and repurchase Klimt's The Black Feather Hat, which had belonged to Irene Beran, before she fled the Nazis. The painting's provenance was unclear after it left Beran's collection, resurfacing in Stuttgart in connection to the Nazi Friedrich Welz. Beran's mother and former husband Philip were murdered by the Nazis after being deported to the Theresienstadt concentration camp.

Other Klimts that have been the object of ownership battles owing to a history of Nazi looting include the Beethoven Frieze, Water Serpents II, Blooming Meadow and Portrait of Gertrude Lowe.

== See also ==
- Bride of the Wind (biopic)
- Japonisme
- Klimt (film)
- Klimt University of Vienna Ceiling Paintings
- Klimt Villa
- List of Austrian artists and architects
- List of claims for restitution for Nazi-looted art
- List of paintings by Gustav Klimt
- Lost artworks
- Secession Building
- Stoclet Frieze

== Bibliography ==
- Tobias G. Natter, Max Hollein (Eds.): Klimt & Rodin: An Artistic Encounter, DelMonico Books – Prestel Publishing, Munich 2017, ISBN 978-3-7913-5708-9.
- Tobias G. Natter (Ed.): Gustav Klimt: The Complete Paintings, Taschen, Cologne 2012, ISBN 978-3836527958.
- O'Connor, Anne-Marie (2012). The Lady in Gold, The Extraordinary Tale of Gustav Klimt's Masterpiece, Portrait of Adele Bloch-Bauer, Alfred A. Knopf, New York, ISBN 0-307-26564-1.
- Tobias G. Natter, Christoph Grunenberg (Eds.):Gustav Klimt. Painting, Design and Modern Life, Tate Publishing, London 2008, ISBN 978-1-85437-735-7.
- Salfellner, Harald (2018), Klimt. An Illustrated Life.
- The Belvedere Vienna & The Van Gogh Museum Amsterdam (editors) (2023), Klimt. Inspired by Van Gogh, Rodin, Matisse.... Hirmer. ISBN 978-3-77743-518-3.

=== Inline ===
- Bäumer, Angelica (1986), Gustav Klimt: Women, translated by Ewald, Osers (1st ed.), London: Weidenfeld & Nicolson, ISBN 9780297790310.
- Bailey, Colin B.; Colins, John; Vergo, Peter; Braun, Emily; Kallir, Jane; Bisanz-Prakken, Marian (2001), Bailey, Colin B. (ed.), Gustav Klimt: Modernism in the Making (Exhibition catalogue), New York: Harry N. Abrams in association with National Gallery of Canada, Ottawa.
- Bisanz-Prakken, Marian; Clegg, Elizabeth; Kallir, Jane (2018), Klimt / Schiele: Drawings: Drawings from the Albertina Museum, Vienna, translated by Foster, Michael (1st ed.), Royal Academy of Arts, ISBN 978-1-910350-94-2
- Fischer, Wolfgang G.; McEwan, Dorothea (1992), Gustav Klimt & Emilie Flöge : an artist and his muse, London: Lund Humphries, ISBN 0853316074.
- Fliedl, Gottfried (1994), Gustav Klimt 1862–1918 The World in Female Form (PDF), Benedikt Taschen, ISBN 3822802905.
- Hodge, Susie (2014), Gustav Klimt: Masterpieces of Art, Fulham, London: Flame Tree Publishing, ISBN 978-1-80417-706-8
- Kinsella, Eileen (January 2007), "Gold Rush", ARTnews.
- Sabarsky, Serge (1983), Gustav Klimt: Drawings, et al, Moyer Bell, ISBN 9780918825193.
- Wenzel, Angela (2022), Klimt, Verlag, Munich/London/New York: Prestel Publishing, ISBN 978-3-7913-8793-2
- Whitford, Frank (1990), Klimt, Thames & Hudson, ISBN 9780500202463.
