= The Three Ages of Woman (Klimt) =

1905 painting by Gustav Klimt

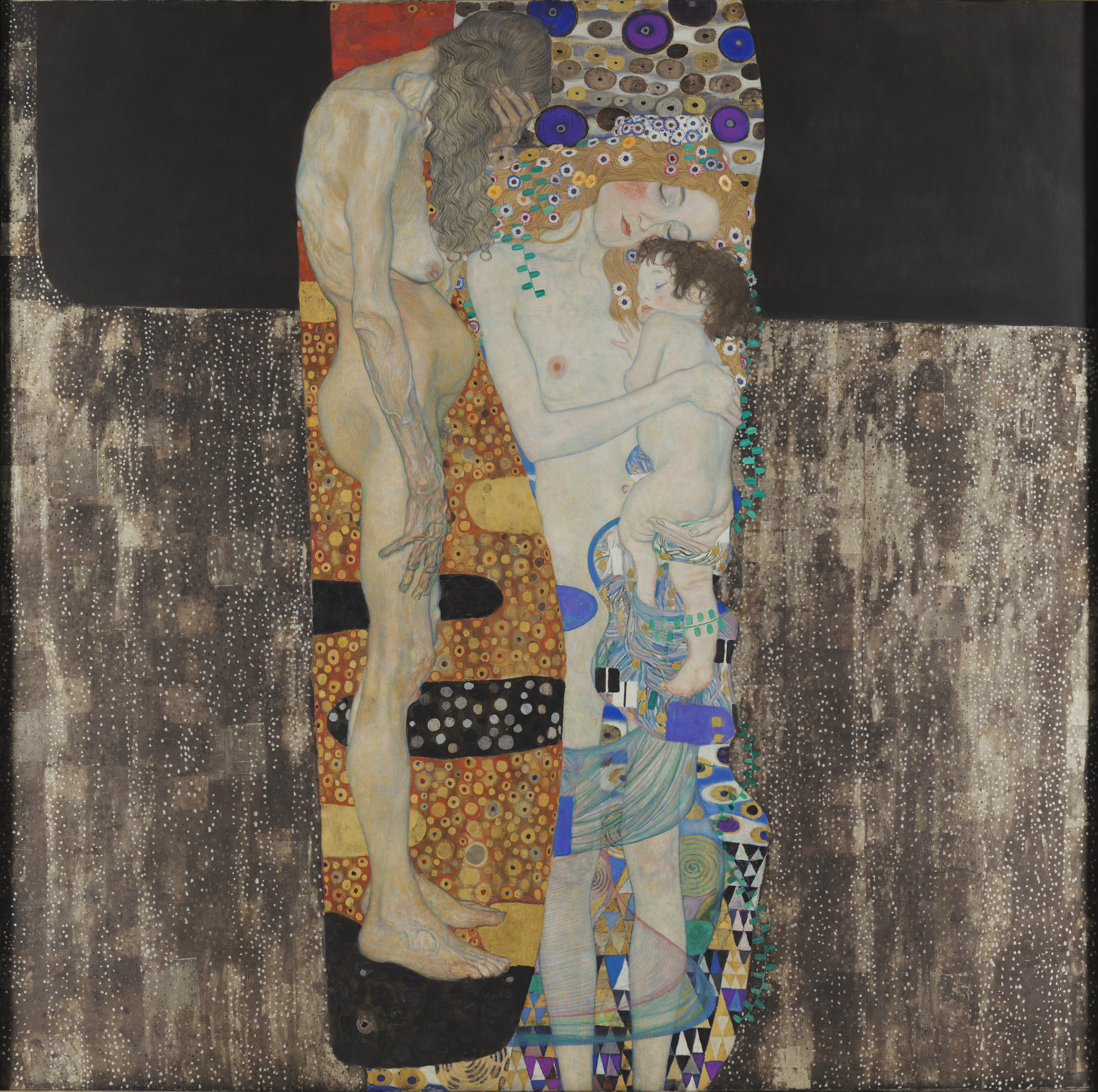
- Artist: Gustav Klimt
- Year: 1905
- Medium: Oil on canvas
- Dimensions: 180 cm × 180 cm (71 in × 71 in)
- Location: Galleria Nazionale d'Arte Moderna, Rome

The Three Ages of Woman (German: Die drei Lebensalter der Frau) is a painting that was completed in Austria in 1905 by Gustav Klimt, symbolist painter and one of the most prominent members of the Vienna Secession movement.

The painting was exhibited during the second exhibition of the Deutsche Künstlerbund in May-October 1905 in Berlin under the title Die drei Lebensalter ("The Three Ages").

== Description ==
The work features women in varying stages of age, symbolizing the cycle of life. The three are central on the canvas and are the focal point of the work. The background has a lack of depth, making it look very two dimensional. The colors are neutral and create a restful effect. Klimt's common use of colorful motifs is also evident in this work. There are two vertical auras that the women are in. The two younger figures are in a blue aura that has a fluid pattern of cool colors. The old woman is in an aura by herself, and it is filled with a less fluid pattern with more distinct separations in the design. The colors of this aura are warm, earthy tones that contrast with the cool colors of the other aura. The woman and the auras overlap slightly. The leg of the young woman goes behind the left aura and the old woman's head comes in front of the right aura.

The youngest figure, a child, is connected to the young woman who is her mother. They are the only two touching.They also have sheer blue fabric draped down their legs. The child and her mother both have their eyes closed. The young woman has flowers around her head which represent spring. Her hair is bright and voluminous, contrasting with that of the old woman, who is separated from the other two women. Her head is turned away and facing down. The effects of old age are obvious through her sagging skin, bloated belly, and prominent veins. She is also unlike the other two in the fact that both of her feet are shown. This was done so the viewer can see the ugliness of her age in its entirety.

== Klimt, and the Vienna Secession ==
The artist, Gustav Klimt, was a prominent Austrian painter who was born in 1862. He worked as an apprentice of Ferdinand Laufberger during the early part of his art career. Later he was a founding member and the first president of the Vienna Secession from 1897 to 1903. He and fellow artist formed the secession after leaving Künstlerhaus, or the Corporation of Austrian Artists due to differences in views. The Secession held many exhibitions and also founded a magazine titled Ver Sacrum, which translates as sacred spring. Here they published many writers and artists all while sharing the views of the Vienna Secession. Klimt left the Vienna Secession in 1905, the same year that The Three Ages of Woman was completed.

== Technical elements ==
This is an oil on canvas painting that measures 180 by 180 centimeters. It shows signs of an impasto painting technique that was common of Klimt's work. His painting methods included mixing drying solvents into the paint to make sure there was no unwanted glossy appearance. He also would retouch works, which limited how many paintings he was able to create per year. The Three Ages of Woman falls into Klimt's Golden Period which includes other works such as The Kiss. This period was characterized by high ornamentation and the use of gold and metallic paints. This work also suggests that it is part of the Art Nouveau movement due to the time period and the decorative elements. The Painting is located in Rome at the Galleria Nazionale d'Arte Moderna.

== See also ==
- List of paintings by Gustav Klimt
- The Ages and Death

== Sources ==
- Eisler, Max. Gustav Klimt. Vienna: Rikola Verlag LTD. 1921
- "KLIMT, Gustav." Benezit Dictionary of Artists. Oxford Art Online. Oxford University Press, accessed November 25, 2014
- Vergo, Peter. "Klimt, Gustav." Grove Art Online. Oxford Art Online. Oxford University Press, accessed November 29, 2014
