= Oskar Justinus =

German playwright and writer

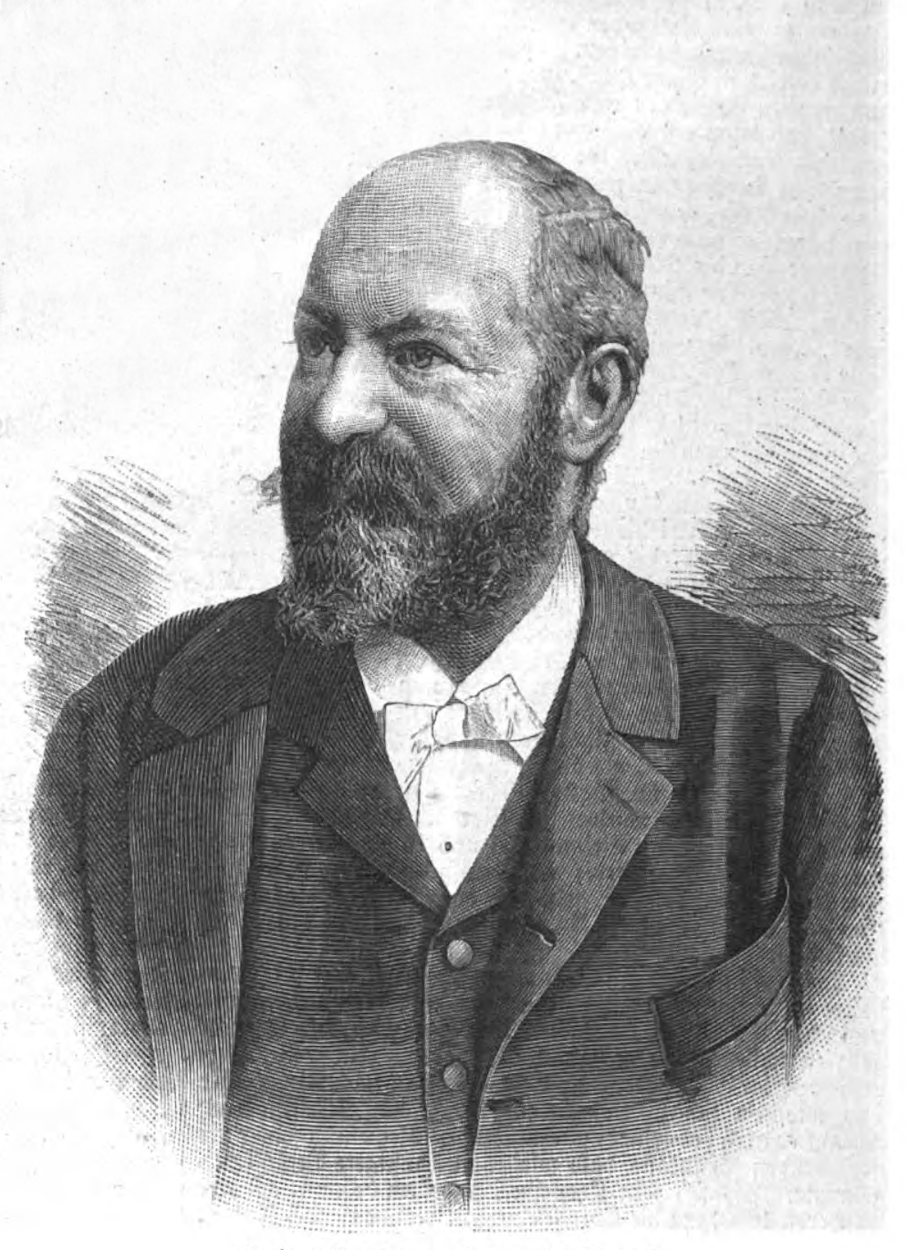
- Born: Oskar Justinus Cohn; 21 February 1839; Breslau, Silesia, Kingdom of Prussia
- Died: 6 August 1893 (aged 54); Bad Nauheim, German Empire
- Occupations: Playwright, writer
- Relatives: Ferdinand Cohn (brother); Max Conrat (brother); Hugo Conrat (brother); Ilse Twardowski-Conrat (niece); Erica Tietze-Conrat (niece)
- Writing career
- Language: German

Oskar Justinus Cohn (21 February 1839 – 6 August 1893), best known by the pen name Oskar Justinus, was a German playwright and writer.

== Biography ==
Oskar Justinus Cohn was born into a Jewish family in Breslau (modern-day Wrocław, Poland). His father, Isaak Cohn, earned a doctorate at an advanced age and for some time held the post of Austro-Hungarian consul. Among his siblings were biologist Ferdinand Cohn, legal historian Max Conrat, and composer Hugo Conrat.

Cohn made his debut in the dramatic world in 1861 with his play Der Vereins-Held, which was staged in Breslau. His literary pursuits came to a pause, however, as he assumed control of the firm established by his father. He was unsuccessful as a merchant and went into bankruptcy in 1880. Cohn then relocated to Berlin and turned his attention fully to literature, producing several dramatic works in quick succession.

He died in 1893 in Bad Nauheim, where he had sought treatment for a heart condition.

== Legacy ==
The writer's 1887 comedy Kyritz-Pyritz was adapted to film in 1930 by Carl Heinz Wolff, as Errant Husbands.

== Publications ==
=== Comedies ===
- Die Getreidespekulanten. 1876.
- Eine Episode aus den Pickwickiern. 1876.
- Zu Spät. 1877.
- Oel und Petroleum. 1877.
- Der Letzte Termin. 1877.
- Die Gründung aus Liebe. 1878.
- Unser Ziegeuner. 1878.
- Eine Stille Familie. 1878.
- Das Vierte R!. 1879.
- Drei Trotzköpfe. 1880.
- Gesellschaftliche Pflichten. 1881. With Heinrich Wilken.
- Apfelröschen. 1883.
- Penelope. 1883.
- Kommerzienrat Königsberger. 1883.
- Cohn, Oskar Justinus (1885). Ein Photographiealbum.
- Kyritz-Pyritz. 1887. With Heinrich Wilken.
- Griechisches Feuer. 1887.
- Die Liebesprobe. 1888.
- Humoristisches Kleeblatt. 1888.
- In der Kinderstube. 1889.

=== Tragedies ===
- Der Bauherr. 1877.

=== Novels ===
- Amor auf Reisen. 1888.
- Cohn, Oskar Justinus (1889). Berliner Humor, Auf Rollendem Rade.
- In der Zehnmillionen Stadt. 1890.
- Italienischer Salat. 1892.
- Ein Proletarierkind. 1893.
- Häuslicher Bilderbogen. 1894. Published posthumously.
