= Oskar Kokoschka =

Austrian dramatic, painter and writer (1886–1980)

Oskar Kokoschka CBE
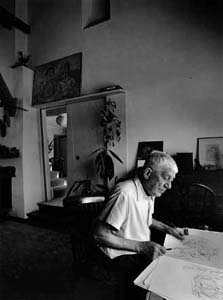
- Oskar Kokoschka in 1963
- Born: 1 March 1886; Pöchlarn, Austria-Hungary
- Died: 22 February 1980 (aged 93); Montreux, Switzerland
- Known for: Painting, printmaking, poetry, play writing
- Movement: Expressionism

Signature
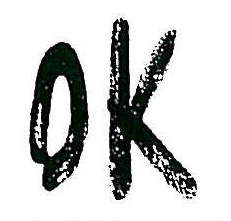

Oskar Kokoschka (Austrian German: [ˈkɔkɔʃka]; 1 March 1886 – 22 February 1980) was an Austrian (though, at times during his life, he had also Czech and British citizenship) artist, poet, playwright and teacher, best known for his intense expressionistic portraits and landscapes, as well as his theories on vision that influenced the Viennese Expressionist movement.

== Early life ==
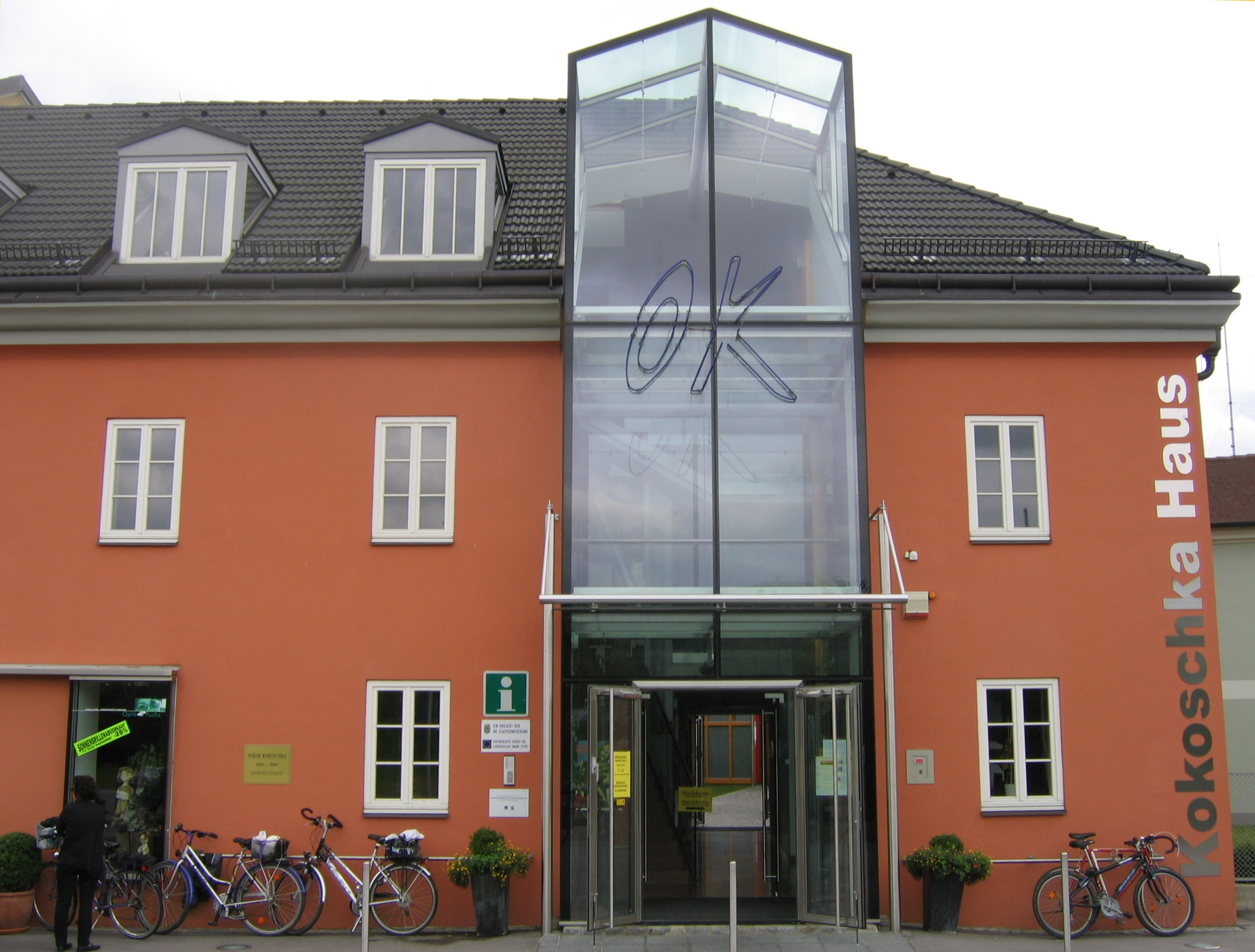
The house in which Oskar Kokoschka was born in Pöchlarn (August 2006)

The second child of Gustav Josef Kokoschka, a goldsmith, and Maria Romana Kokoschka (née Loidl), Oskar Kokoschka was born in Pöchlarn. He had a sister, Berta, born in 1889; a brother, Bohuslav, born in 1892; and an elder brother who died in infancy. Oskar had a strong belief in omens, spurred by a story of a fire breaking out in Pöchlarn shortly after his mother gave birth to him.

The family's life was not easy, largely due to a lack of financial stability of his father. They constantly moved into smaller flats, farther and farther from the thriving centre of the town. Concluding that his father was inadequate, Kokoschka drew closer to his mother; and seeing himself as the head of the household, he continued to support his family when he gained financial independence.

Kokoschka entered a Realschule in 1897, a type of secondary school, where emphasis was placed on the study of modern subjects such as the sciences and language. Despite his intent of continuing a formal education in chemistry, Kokoschka was not interested in such subjects, as he only excelled in art, and spent most of his time reading classic literature during his lessons. Like many of Kokoschka's French and German contemporaries, he was interested in the primitive and exotic art featured in the ethnographical exhibits around Europe.

== Education ==
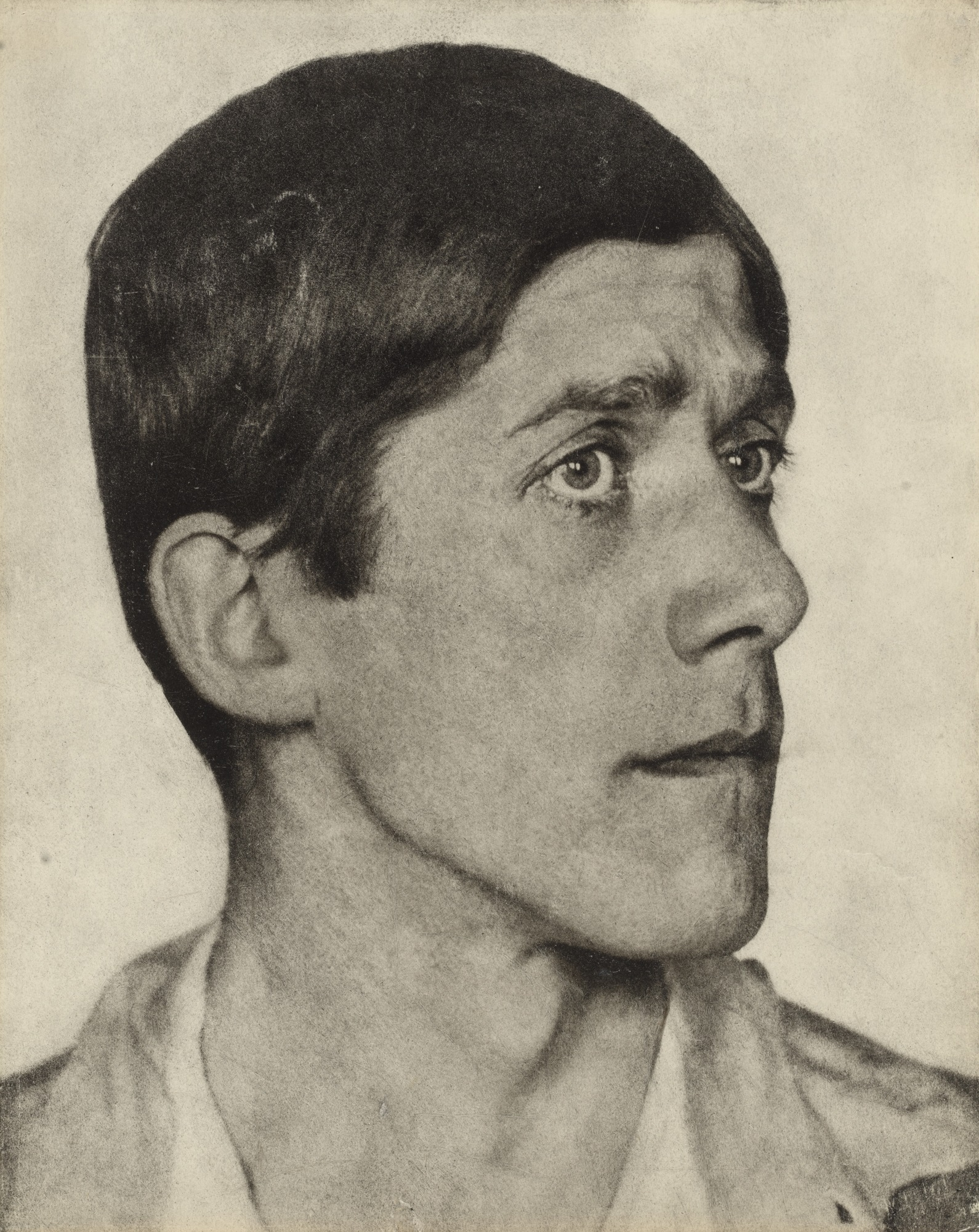
Kokoschka by Hugo Erfurth, 1919

One of Kokoschka's teachers suggested he pursue a career in the fine arts after being impressed by some of his drawings. Against his father's will, Kokoschka applied to the Kunstgewerbeschule in Vienna, now the University of Applied Arts Vienna. He received a scholarship and was one of few applicants to be accepted. The Vienna Kunstgewerbeschule was a progressive school of applied arts that focused mainly on architecture, furniture, crafts, and modern design. Unlike the more prestigious and traditional Academy of Fine Arts Vienna, the Kunstgewerbeschule was dominated by instructors of the Vienna Secession. Kokoschka studied there from 1904 to 1909 and was influenced by his teacher Carl Otto Czeschka in developing an original style.

Among Kokoschka's early works were gesture drawings of children, which portrayed them as awkward and corpse-like. Kokoschka had no formal training in painting and so approached the medium without regard to the "traditional" or "correct" way to paint. The teachers at the Kunstgewerbeschule helped Kokoschka gain opportunities through the Wiener Werkstätte or Viennese Workshops. Kokoschka's first commissions were postcards and drawings for children. Later, Kokoschka said that this exercise provided "the basis of [his] artistic training". His early career was marked by portraits of Viennese celebrities, painted in a nervously animated style.

Following his own artistic training, Kokoschka dedicated years of his life thereafter teaching art and writing articles and speeches documenting his views and practices as an educator. 17th-century Czech humanist and education reformer, Jan Amos Comenius, was Kokoschka’s primary influence in terms of how to approach education. From Comenius’s theories, Kokoschka adopted the belief that students benefit most from using their five senses to facilitate reasoning. Kokoschka taught in Vienna from 1911 to 1913 and then again in Dresden from 1919 to 1923. While his efforts as a teacher were noted in various publications, they generally focused on his personality captured within his own art rather than his classroom practices. Kokoschka neglected the conventional structured methodologies and theories assumed by art educators, and instead taught through storytelling infused with mythological themes and dramatic emotion. In 1912, Kokoschka delivered his essay “Von der Natur der Gesichte” (“On the Nature of Visions”) at the Akademischen Verband für Literatur und Musik in Vienna. This essay outlined Kokoschka’s artistic conceptualization about the relationship between inner vision and optical sight. In considering his own art, Kokoschka expressed that inspiration stemmed from daily observations that he collected optically while engaging with his contemporary surroundings. Kokoschka’s ability to acknowledge how these stimulations manifested within his inner imagination resulted in works that draw upon the subconscious rather than optical vision. Further, Kokoschka granted the viewer with the task of interpreting the image based upon how they experience the vision within their own realm of consciousness. This concept, in congruency with Wassily Kandinsky’s theory pertaining to spirituality in art, has become the basis for which art historians understand Viennese Expressionism.

== Career ==
=== Vienna Avant-Garde ===
In 1908 Kokoschka was offered the opportunity of submitting works to the first Vienna Kunstschau. This government funded exhibition was established to both bring in tourists and affirm Vienna's prominence within the art world. Kokoschka received a commission from the Director of the Wiener Werkstätte, Fritz Wärndorfer, for color images that would supplement a children’s book and be displayed at the exhibition. Kokoschka, however, took the liberty of producing images that would serve as illustrations to the poem he wrote a year earlier, Die träumenden Knaben (The Dreaming Youths), which took on the form of an autobiographical adolescent fantasy that was inappropriate for a young audience. In his autobiography, Kokoschka explained the origins of the poem, which follow his personal experience as a young student who was in love with his Swedish classmate, Lilith. Die träumenden Knaben consists of introductory pages with two small black and white lithographs, in addition to eight larger color lithographs with a vertical column of text positioned beside each image. Influenced by the compositions found in medieval art, Kokoschka depicted various moments in time simultaneously within each individual image. Kokoschka also adopted the bold lines and expressive colors of traditional European folk art and juxtaposed them with the stylized ornamentation and two-dimensional bodies of Jugendstil. The final page, titled Das Mädchen Li und ich (the Girl Li and I), features the angular forms of the young boy (Kokoschka) and girl (Lilith), taking on the style of the Belgian sculptor George Minne. This work, which Kokoschka dedicated to his former teacher Gustav Klimt, demonstrates the transition from Jugendstil to Expressionism.

Die träumenden Knaben along with the tapestry titled The Dream Bearers, which is now lost, were the first works ever to be exhibited by Kokoschka. Like the book illustrations, Kokoschka’s tapestry was considered disturbing due to its depiction of youthful, exotic and sexualized fantasies. Upon showing these two works, Kokoschka was subject to a backlash from conservative officials and only a small proportion of the five hundred copies of Die träumenden Knaben were actually bound and sold. As a result, he was expelled from the Kunstgewerbeschule and found his place within the Viennese avant-garde. Austrian architect Adolf Loos befriended Kokoschka and introduced him to other avant-garde members who then became his subjects in a series of portrait paintings.

=== Portraiture ===
Portrait of Lotte Franzos (1909), The Phillips Collection

Kokoschka painted a bulk of his portraiture between 1909 and 1914. Unlike many of his contemporaries who were also receiving portrait commissions, such as Edvard Munch, Kokoschka maintained complete artistic freedom because they were generally not ordered directly by the sitter. A majority of Kokoschka’s subjects were clients of the architect Loos, and it was Loos who ordered the portraits and agreed to purchase them if the sitter chose not to. Other portraits by Kokoschka feature friends and advocates within his circle who supported the modern art of this period. Prominent members of this group who had their portraits painted include the art dealer Herwarth Walden, art supporter Lotte Franzos, poet Peter Altenberg, and art historians Hans and Erica Tietze.

Kokoschka’s portraits demonstrate the conventions of traditional portraiture, primarily regarding the perspective in which he captures the sitters. However, Kokoschka also adopted elements of the modern style which involved incorporating hands within the composition to further capture the emotion expressed through an individual's gestures. These portraits also utilize the unconscious positioning of the sitter’s body, which Kokoschka believed would unveil the inner tensions of their subconscious.

Kokoschka’s portraits incorporate an expressive color palette similar to those featured in the works of German Die Brücke artists at the time. Kokoschka’s use of shrill, harsh colors that make the subjects appear as rotting corpses is not meant to be understood as a portrayal of their individual physical conditions, but rather an overarching indication of a decomposing age. The bold lines and patches of bright color juxtaposed against an otherwise solid, dull background were visual interpretations of the anxieties felt by Kokoschka and those in circle. Kokoschka’s portraits, however, differed from those of his contemporaries due to his belief in the symbolic importance of the act of painting itself, which is emphasized by visible brushstrokes and areas of exposed canvas. Kokoschka integrated painterly techniques with those used in drawing, as seen in his use of vibrant and contrasting colors, rapid brushstrokes, anxious scratch marks, and uneven handling.

In a letter from 1909, Kokoschka noted that he “would like to do a nervously disordered portrait.” With no additional elements to establish a narrative for the sitter, Kokoschka stressed that the essence of the individual comes out through the means of creating their image. Patrick Werkner, an art historian, describes Kokoschka’s portraits by suggesting that it is as if the skin becomes separated from the body, allowing the viewer to see through the physiognomy like a veil only to make visible the means of depiction. Kokoschka’s portraits as a whole comment on the overwhelming feelings of uncertainty felt by those who were aware of the shifting cultural milieu leading up the end of the old order of the Austrian Empire in 1918.

Kokoschka’s portrait, Hans Tietze and Erica Tietze-Conrat, was painted in 1909 in the library of the couple’s home. Aside from being close friends of the artist, the couple were also prominent art historians of the time. Erica Tietze-Conrat explained that while Kokoschka was creating their portrait, he encouraged them to move freely and continue their work at the two desks that were situated adjacent to one another by a window. After painting her husband in profile, Kokoschka asked Erica to position herself so that he could paint her frontally. Shortly after beginning the painting, Kokoschka set down his paintbrush and began using only his fingers. Kokoschka used his fingernails to scratch thin lines into the paint, which appear in outlines and areas of hatching and crosshatching, as well as throughout the background. Although painted in their library, the figures appear to be existing in a surreal, subliminal space. Kokoschka blends vibrant tones of blue and red upon an otherwise muted green background. In the portrait, the couple do not face each other, but their hands reach out as if they are about to touch. Their hands then become the means of communication, symbolizing the bridge for which their inner energies may flow back and forth. The couple was forced to flee Austria in 1938 as a result of their Jewish heritage, but were able to take with them this portrait that they refused to exhibit until it was purchased by the Museum of Modern Art in 1939.

=== Berlin ===
The Bride of the Wind or The Tempest, oil on canvas, a self-portrait expressing his love for Alma Mahler, widow of composer Gustav Mahler, 1914

Kokoschka moved to Berlin in 1910, the same year the Neue Secession was established in Berlin. The group, composed of artists and philosophers such as Emil Nolde, Ernst Ludwig Kirchner, Erich Heckel and Max Pechstein, formed as a rebellion against the older Secession group. While Kokoschka refrained from adopting the group's techniques and ideologies, he did admire the sense of community established between its members. Berlin art dealer Paul Cassirer saw promise in Kokoschka's works and launched the artist into the international circle. Around the same time, Herwarth Walden, a publisher and art critic who was introduced to Kokoschka by Loos, employed Kokoschka as an illustrator for his magazine Der Sturm. Twenty-eight drawings by Kokoschka were published in the magazine during its first year; and although he was featured significantly less, Kokoschka remained a contributor to the periodical. Kokoschka's first piece for Der Sturm, a drawing from the series Menschenköpfe (People's Heads), was dedicated to Karl Kraus. The twentieth Issue of the periodical featured both Kokoschka's first cover illustration, which supplemented Mörder, Hoffnung der Frauen, as well as the artist's first literary contribution. Kokoschka continued to travel back and forth between Vienna and Berlin over the next four years.

Kokoschka had a passionate, often stormy affair with Alma Mahler. It began in 1912, five years after the death of her four-year-old daughter Maria Mahler and two years after her affair with Walter Gropius, later a celebrated architect in Berlin. But after two years together, Alma rejected him, explaining that she was afraid of being too overcome with passion. She married Walter Gropius in 1915 and lived with him until their divorce in 1920. Kokoschka continued to love Alma Mahler his entire life, and one of his most acclaimed works, The Bride of the Wind (The Tempest; 1913), is expressive of their relationship. The poet Georg Trakl visited the studio while Kokoschka was painting this masterpiece. Kokoschka's poem Allos Makar was inspired by this relationship.

=== World War I ===
He volunteered for service as a cavalryman in the Austrian army in World War I, and in 1915 was seriously wounded. At the hospital, the doctors decided that he was mentally unstable. Nevertheless, he continued to develop his career as an artist, traveling across Europe and painting the landscape.

He commissioned a life-sized female doll from the dollmaker Hermine Moos in 1918. Although intended to simulate Alma and receive his affection, the 'Alma doll' did not satisfy Kokoschka and he destroyed it during a party.

In 1919, Kokoschka began teaching at the Kunstakademie Dresden. In an open letter addressed to the inhabitants of Dresden from 1920, Kokoschka argued that the civil war battles between the revolutionary parties should be moved outside of the city’s borders in order to protect the art which could not escape the crossfire. This letter was penned after an incident on 15 March 1920 when a bullet damaged Bathsheba at the Fountain, a painting by Peter Paul Rubens. As a result of his letter, Kokoschka received backlash from the Communist artists George Grosz and John Heartfield in what was referred to as the Kunstlump debate, or Art Scoundrel Debate. Many other artists, however, continued to support the work of Kokoschka.

In May 1922 he attended the International Congress of Progressive Artists and signed the "Founding Proclamation of the Union of Progressive International Artists".

Kokoschka returned to Vienna in the autumn of 1931, where he spent six months in the home he had purchased for his parents eleven years earlier. Located in Vienna’s 16th District known as Liebharstal, the house, now functioning as the artist’s studio, provided a view of Schloss Wilhelminenberg which had been converted into a Kinderheim, or orphanage, by the City Council. During this time, Kokoschka accepted a commission by the Social Democratic City Council, ‘Red Vienna,’ for a painting that would be hung inside the Rathaus, or City Hall. Kokoschka, along with other Austrian artists, was asked to create an artwork depicting Vienna in contribution to this project managed by the Historisches Museum der Stadt (Wien Museum). In honor of the humanitarian efforts of the City Counsel, Kokoschka decided to illustrate children playing outside of the palace in the foreground of the composition which otherwise consisted of a cityscape. Other identifiable Viennese architecture within the painting includes the City Hall and St. Stephen's Cathedral.

=== "Degeneracy" and World War II ===
Deemed a "degenerate" by the Nazis, Kokoschka fled Austria in 1934 for Prague. In Prague his name was adopted by a group of other expatriate artists, the Oskar-Kokoschka-Bund (OKB), though Kokoschka did not participate in the group (largely to protect his family) he acknowledged the importance of their group. He obtained Czechoslovak citizenship in 1935. In 1938, when the Czechs began to mobilize for the expected invasion by the Wehrmacht, he fled to the United Kingdom and remained there during the war. With the help of the British Committee for Refugees from Czechoslovakia (later the Czech Refugee Trust Fund), all members of the OKB were able to escape through Poland and Sweden.

During World War II, Kokoschka painted anti-Fascist works such as the allegory What We Are Fighting For (1943). While in London, he reconnected with a former pupil, Mina Carney, and attended her salons with othet leftist artists and writers at her home on Fleet Street. Kokoschka left the bustling city center of London and settled in Polperro, in Cornwall. While residing in this seaside village, Kokoschka made paintings depicting landscapes of the harbor, along with The Crab, which began a series of works embedded with political allegories resisting the Nazi regime. Kokoschka’s The Crab was painted between 1939 and 1940, and captures the view of the harbor from the artist’s house in Polperro. This work functions as a self-portrait of the artist, where Kokoschka is the swimmer representing Czechoslovakia. The large crab is symbolic of Neville Chamberlain, the British Prime Minister at the time the painting was created. In explaining this painting, Kokoschka said the crab “would only have to put out one claw to save him from drowning, but remains aloof.” Further, this painting demonstrates the instability he felt as a result of German occupation forcing him to seek refuge in other countries across Europe. This landscape painting, amongst others by Kokoschka, were brought with him to London unfinished where they were transformed into political allegories. While in London, Kokoschka also painted The Red Egg, another political painting referencing the destruction of Czechoslovakia. In this satirical painting, Kokoschka comments on the Munich Agreement of 1938 with grotesque caricatures of Benito Mussolini and Adolf Hitler.

During several summer months, he and his young Czech wife, Oldřiška “Olda” Palkovská Kokoschka (1915–2009), lived in Ullapool, a village in Wester Ross, Scotland. There he drew with coloured pencil (a technique he developed in Scotland), and painted many local landscape views in watercolour. While in Ullapool, Kokoschka painted a portrait of his friend, the wealthy industrialist Ferdinand Bloch-Bauer, Uncle of Maria Altmann. The painting hangs at the Kunsthaus Museum in Zurich. Between 1941–1946 he and Olda spent several weeks each summer with the Czech Professor Emil Korner at his home The House of Elrig in Wigtownshire.

== Later life ==
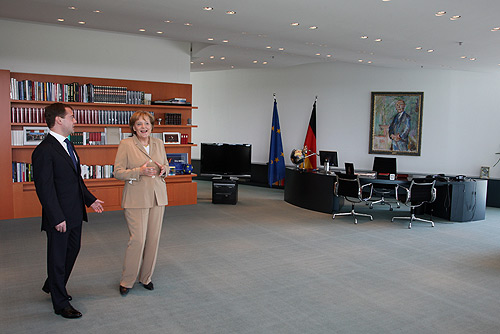
Angela Merkel with Dmitry Medvedev in her office, 2008; a painting of Konrad Adenauer by Oskar Kokoschka hangs above her desk

Kokoschka naturalised as a British subject on 21 February 1947 and would only regain Austrian citizenship in 1978. He travelled briefly to the United States in 1947 before settling in Villeneuve, Switzerland in 1953, where he lived the rest of his life. Kokoschka spent these years as an educator at the Internationale Sommer Akademie für Bildenden Künste, (Ricarda Jacobi being one of his pupils) while also working on stage designs and publishing a collection of his writings. A retrospective of Kokoschka's work was exhibited at the Tate Gallery in London in 1962. As a member of the Deutscher Künstlerbund, Oskar Kokoschka took part in its annual exhibitions from 1952 to 1955.[16] He took part in documenta 1 (1955), documenta II (1959), and also documenta III in 1964 in Kassel. In 1966 he won the competition for the commissioned portrait of Konrad Adenauer for the German Bundestag against his competitor Eugen Denzel.

Kokoschka died on 22 February 1980 in Montreux, at the age of 93, eight days before his 94th birthday, of complications after contracting influenza. He was interred in the Montreux Central Cemetery.

Kokoschka had much in common with his contemporary Max Beckmann. Both maintained their independence from German Expressionism, yet are now regarded as textbook examples of the style. Nonetheless, their individualism set both apart from the main movements of twentieth-century modernism. Both wrote eloquently of the need to develop the art of "seeing" (Kokoschka emphasized depth perception while Beckmann was concerned with mystical insight into the invisible realm), and both were masters of innovative oil-painting techniques anchored in earlier traditions.

== Honours ==
Kokoschka was appointed Commander of the Order of the British Empire in the 1959 New Year Honours. He also received the Erasmus Prize in 1960 together with Marc Chagall.

== Artworks ==
Portrait of Lotte Franzos 1909, (oil on canvas, 114.9 cm × 79.4 cm), The Phillips Collection, Washington, DC

Nude with Back Turned, ink, gouache and chalk drawing, c. 1907

Veronica's Veil. 1911, (120,6 cm x 80,7 cm), Museum of Fine Arts, Budapest

'The Port of Marseille', painting by Oskar Kokoschka, 1925, Musée Cantini de Marseille

- 1909: Lotte Franzos
- 1909: Martha Hirsch I
- 1909: Hans and Erika Tietze
- 1909: St. Veronica with the Sudarium
- 1909: Les Dents du Midi
- 1909: Children Playing
- 1910: Still Life with Lamb and Hyacinth
- 1910: Rudolf Blümner
- 1911: Lady in Red
- 1911: Hermann Schwarzwald I
- 1911: Egon Wellesz
- 1911: Crucifixion
- 1912: Two Nudes
- 1913: Landscape in the Dolomites (with Cima Tre Croci)
- 1913: The Tempest
- 1913: Carl Moll
- 1913: Still Life with Putto and Rabbit
- 1914: The Bride of the Wind
- 1914: Portrait of Franz Hauser
- 1915: Knight Errant
- 1917: Portrait of the Artist's Mother
- 1917: Lovers with Cat
- 1917: Stockholm Harbour
- 1920: The Power of Music
- 1919: Dresden, Neustadt I
- 1921: Dresden, Neustadt II
- 1921: Two Girls
- 1922: Self-Portrait at the Easel
- 1923: Self-Portrait with Crossed Arms
- 1924: Venice, Boats on the Dogana
- 1925: Amsterdam, Kloveniersburgwal I
- 1925: Toledo
- 1926: Mandrill
- 1926: Deer
- 1926: London Large Thames View I
- 1929: Arab Women and Child
- 1929: Pyramids at Gizeh
- 1932: Girl with Flowers
- 1934: Prague, View from the Villa Kramář
- 1936: Portrait Ferdinand Bloch-Bauer
- 1937: Olda Palkovská
- 1938: Prague – Nostalgia
- 1940: The Crab
- 1941: Anschluss – Alice in Wonderland
- 1941: The Red Egg
- 1948: Self-Portrait (Fiesole)
- 1950: The Myth of Prometheus
- 1962: Storm Tide in Hamburg
- 1966: The Rejected Lover
- 1966: Portrait of Konrad Adenauer
- 1971: Time, Gentlemen, Please

== Writings ==
Kokoschka's literary works are as peculiar and interesting as his art. His memoir, A Sea Ringed with Visions, details his theories of both corporeal and visceral vision and how they shape consciousness, art, and realities. His short play Murderer, the Hope of Women (1909, set ten years later by Paul Hindemith as Mörder, Hoffnung der Frauen) is often called the first Expressionist drama. His Orpheus und Eurydike (1918) became an opera by Ernst Krenek, who was first approached for incidental music.

=== Bibliography ===
- 1908: Die traumenden Knaben (The Dreaming Youths) Vienna: Wiener Werkstätte (Originally published in an edition of 500 by the Wiener Werkstätte. Unsold copies numbered 1–275, were reissued in 1917 by Kurt Wolff Verlag.)
- 1909: Mörder, Hoffnung der Frauen (Murderer, the Hope of Women) (Play)
- 1913: Der gefesselte Columbus (Columbus Bound). [Berlin]: Fritz Gurlitt, [1913] (known as Der weisse Tiertoter (The White Animal Slayer).
- 1919: Orpheus and Eurydike, in: Vier Dramen: Orpheus und Eurydike; Der brennende Dornbusch; Mörder, Hoffnung der Frauen; [and] Hiob. Berlin
- 1955: Designs of the Stage-Settings for W.A. Mozart's Magic Flute, Salzburg Festival 1955/56. Salzburg: Galerie Welz
- 1962: A Sea Ringed with Visions. London: Thames & Hudson ISBN 978-0-500-01014-3 (Autobiography)
- 1974: My Life. Translation by David Britt of Oskar Kokoschka: Mein Leben. London: Thames & Hudson ISBN 978-0-500-01087-7. New York: Macmillan Publishing Co., Inc.

=== First productions of plays ===
- 1907: Sphinx und Strohmann. Komödie für Automaten. 29 March 1909 at Cabaret Fledermaus, Vienna
- 1909: Mörder, Hoffnung der Frauen
- 1911: Der brennende Dornbusch
- 1913: Sphinx und Strohmann, Ein Curiosum. 14 April 1917 in the Dada-Galerie, Zürich
- 1917: Hiob (an enlarged version of Sphinx und Strohmann, 1907)
- 1919: Orpheus und Eurydike
  - 1923: new version as opera libretto; music by Ernst Krenek. 27 November 1926 at the Staatstheater Kassel
- 1936–38/1972: Comenius

=== Articles, essays and writings ===
- 1960: "Lettre de Voyage", Oskar Kokoschka, X magazine, Vol. I, No. II (March 1960)

== See also ==
- Facing the Modern: The Portrait in Vienna 1900

== Literature ==
- Alfred Weidinger: Oskar Kokoschka. Dreaming Boy and Enfant Terrible. Early Graphic Works, 1902–1909. Albertina, Vienna 1996. OCLC 246977185
- Alfred Weidinger: Kokoschka and Alma Mahler: Testimony to a Passionate Relationship. Prestel, New York 1996, ISBN 978-3-7913-1722-9
- Tobias G. Natter, ed., Oskar Kokoschka. The Early Portraits 1909–1914, exhibition catalog Neue Galerie New York and Hamburger Kunsthalle. DuMont, Cologne 2001, ISBN 978-3-8321-7182-7.
- Paul Westheim, Oskar Kokoschka: das Werk Kokoschkas in 135 Abbildungen, exhibition catalogue, Paul Cassirer Verlag, Berlin, 1925.

== Filmography ==
- Kokoschka Life's work, documentary directed by Michel Rodde, Switzerland, 2017, 91', distributed in Canada by K-Films Amérique (VOD).
