= Ferdinand Cohn =

German biologist (1828–1898)

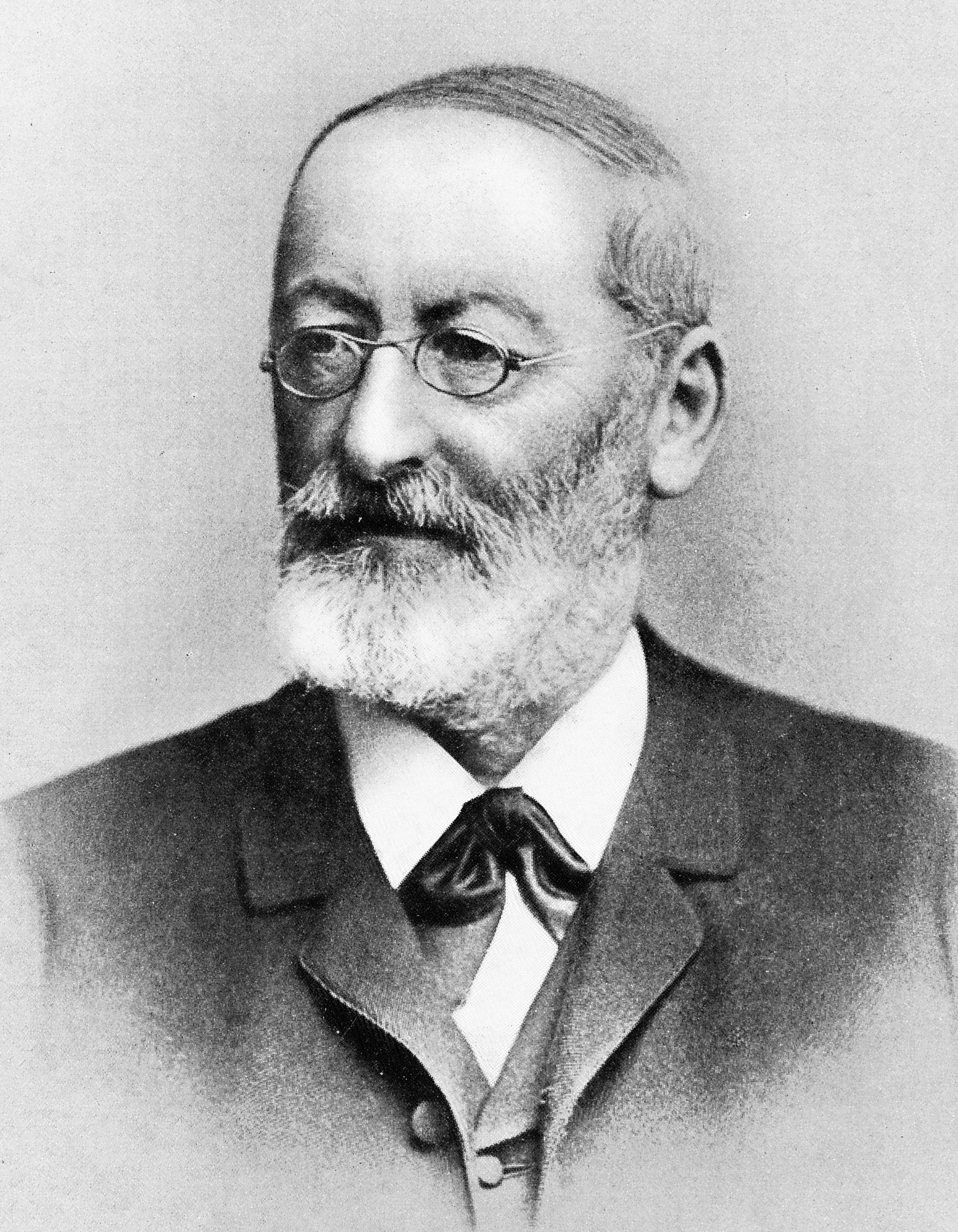
- Born: Ferdinand Julius Cohn; 24 January 1828; Breslau, Silesia, Kingdom of Prussia
- Died: 25 June 1898 (aged 70); Breslau, German Empire
- Resting place: Breslau Jewish Cemetery
- Education: University of Berlin
- Spouse: Pauline Reichenback (m. 1867)
- Relatives: Oskar Justinus (brother); Max Conrat (brother); Hugo Conrat (brother); Ilse Twardowski-Conrat (niece); Erica Tietze-Conrat (niece)
- Awards: Leeuwenhoek Medal (1885); Linnean Medal (1895)
- Scientific career
- Fields: Bacteriology, microbiology
- Workplaces: University of Breslau
- Author abbrev. (botany): Cohn

Ferdinand Julius Cohn (24 January 1828 – 25 June 1898) was a German biologist. He is one of the founders of modern bacteriology and microbiology.

== Biography ==
Ferdinand Julius Cohn was born in the Jewish quarter of Breslau in the Prussian Province of Silesia (modern-day Wrocław, Poland). His father, Issak Cohn, was a successful merchant and manufacturer who for some time held the post of Austro-Hungarian consul. He was the elder brother of humorist and playwright Oskar Justinus Cohn and of historian and jurist Max Conrat.

He was considered a child prodigy, and could read at the age of two. He also suffered hearing impairment from a young age. He entered the Maria-Magdalenen-Gymnasium in 1835 at the age or 6 or 7, and the University of Breslau in 1842 or 1844. There he studied botany under Heinrich Göppert and Christian Nees von Esenbeck.

Cohn was refused admission to the University of Breslau's doctoral program because of his Jewish background. He thus continued his studies at the University of Berlin, where he obtained a Ph.D. in 1847 with a dissertation on the physiology of seeds. In it he advocated for the establishment of botanical gardens dedicated to the study of plant physiology, a vision that he later played a significant role in realizing.

He returned to Breslau in 1848 and, after a delay due to his Jewish heritage, was appointed as a privat-docent in 1850. He remained at that university for the rest of his career, obtaining the titled of professor in 1857 and, following the death of his mentor Göppert, was promoted to a full professorship in 1872.

== Work ==
Cohn was a prolific writer, leaving behind over 150 papers, essays, and books.

In the 1850s he studied the growth and division of plant cells. In 1855 he produced papers on the sexuality of Sphaeroplea annulina and later Volvox globator. In the 1860s he studied plant physiology in several different aspects. From 1870 onward he mostly studied bacteria. He established the use of sterile culture mediums and rediscovered the botanical garden of Lorenz Scholz von Rosenau in Breslau.

Cohn was the first to classify algae as plants, and to define what distinguishes them from green plants. His classification of bacteria into four groups based on shape (sphericals, short rods, threads, and spirals) is still in use today. Among other things Cohn is remembered for being the first to show that Bacillus can change from a vegetative state to an endospore state when subjected to an environment deleterious to the vegetative state.

== Awards ==
Cohn was elected a member of numerous institutions and societies, including the Leopold Carolinische Akademie, Royal Academy of Sciences of Berlin, Société de biologie de France, the Royal Microscopic Society of Great Britain, and the Natural History Society of Boston, among others including in 1889, when he was elected to honorary membership of the Manchester Literary and Philosophical Society.

He received the Leeuwenhoek Medal in 1885, and the Linnean Medal in 1895. For his efforts leading to the establishment of the Botanical Institute in Breslau in 1888, he received the title of Geheimer Regierungsrat. On the occasion of his seventieth birthday he was presented with the honorary freedom of the city of Breslau.
