= İlber Ortaylı =

Turkish historian (1947–2026)

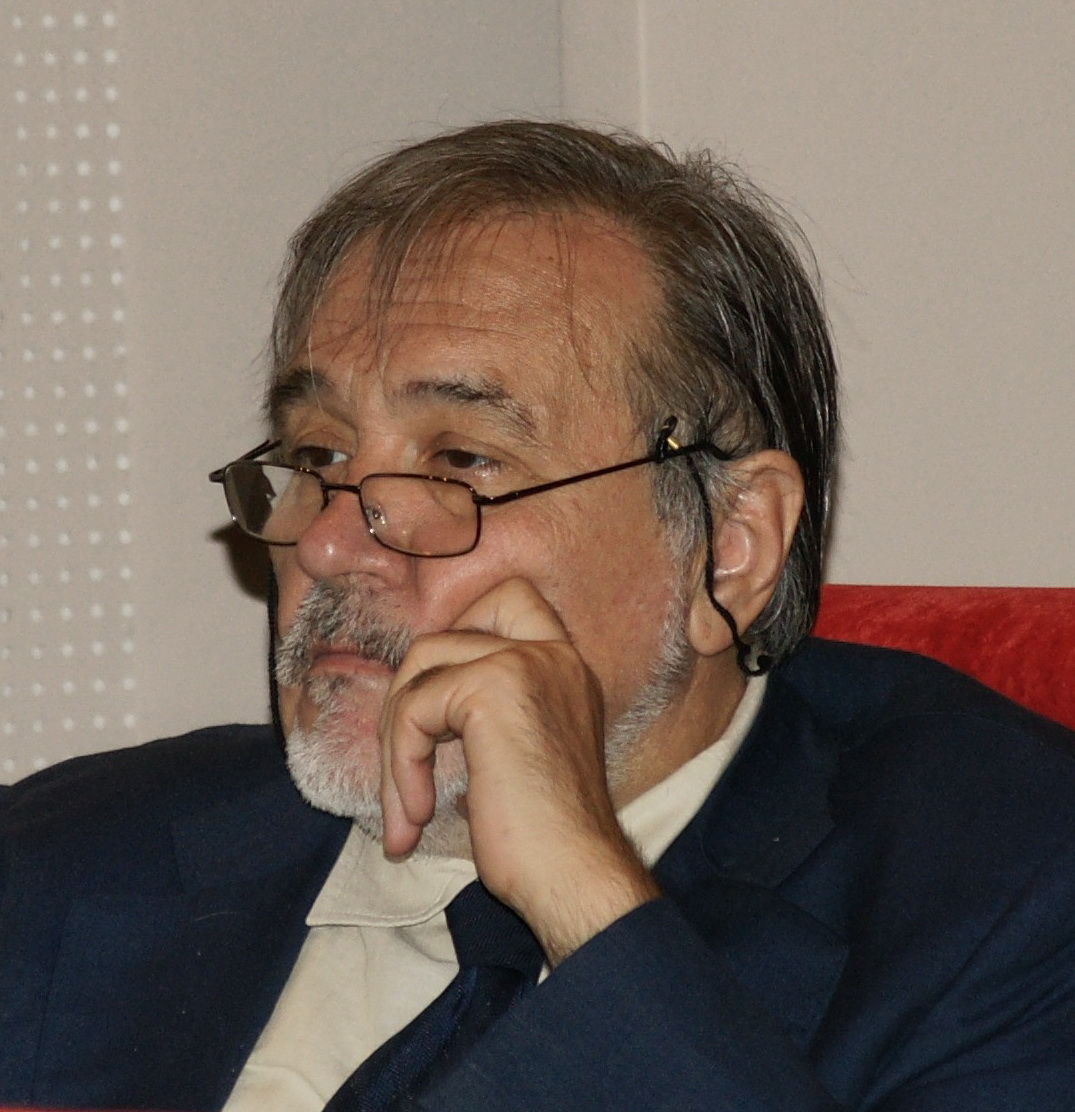
- Ortaylı in 2009
- Born: 21 May 1947; Bregenz, Vorarlberg, Allied-occupied Austria
- Died: 13 March 2026 (aged 78); Zeytinburnu, Istanbul, Turkey
- Resting place: Fatih Mosque Graveyard
- Citizenship: Turkish
- Known for: History of the Ottoman Empire; History of Turkey
- Spouse: Ayşe Özdolay (m. 1981; div. 1999)
- Children: Tuna Ortaylı

Academic background
- Education: Ankara University (BA, PhD); University of Chicago (MA)
- Doctoral advisor: Halil İnalcık

Academic work
- Discipline: History
- Notable works: The Empire's Longest Century (1983); Studies on Ottoman Transformation (1994); Discovering the Ottomans (2006)

İlber Ortaylı (Turkish: [ˈilbæɾ oɾˈtajɫɯ]; 21 May 1947 – 13 March 2026) was a Turkish historian and professor of history of Crimean Tatar origin at the Galatasaray University in Istanbul and at Ankara University and Bilkent University in Ankara. In 2005, he was appointed the director of the Topkapı Museum in Istanbul, until he retired in 2012.

Considered one of the most prominent historians in Turkey, Ortaylı has influenced both academic scholarship and public understanding of history through his research, widely read popular history books, and television programs.

== Early life and education ==
Ortaylı was born on 21 May 1947 in a refugee camp in Bregenz, Austria, where his Crimean Tatar parents, Kemal and Şefika (née Karashaysky; 1918–2020), had fled to avoid Joseph Stalin's deportation of the Crimean Tatars. His family immigrated to Turkey when he was two years old. His father worked as an aircraft engineer and participated in some translation projects on Crimean history. His mother, a descendant of Crimean Tatar Mirza nobility, served long years as a lecturer of Russian language and Literature in the Faculty of Language, History and Geography at Ankara University. He had boy-girl twin siblings, Enver and Emeldar, and another sister, Nuriye.

He started elementary school at St. George's Austrian High School in İstanbul and later transferred to Ankara Atatürk High School. He studied public policy at Ankara University Mekteb-i Mülkiye and later left for Vienna to attend University of Vienna, where he studied both Slavic studies and Oriental studies while he worked with Andreas Tietze. He received his master's degree under the supervision of professor Halil İnalcık at the University of Chicago and obtained his doctorate from the Faculty of Political Science at Ankara University with a thesis on Local Administration in the Tanzimat Period (1978).

== Academic career ==
After his doctorate, he joined the faculty at the School of Political Sciences of Ankara University. In 1979, he was appointed associate professor. In 1982, he resigned from his position to protest the academic policy of the government established after the 1980 Turkish coup d'état. After teaching at several universities in Turkey, Europe and Russia, he in 1989 returned to Ankara University and became a professor of history and the head of the department of administrative history, after having worked at Middle East Technical University in 1988.

Ortaylı made acquaintance with intellectuals from both Turkey and other countries. Notable are Halil İnalcık, Irene Melikoff, Bernard Lewis, Andreas Tietze.

His published articles are mainly in Turkish, German and French and a variety of them are translated into English.

Ortaylı was an honorary member of the Macedonian Academy of Sciences and Arts (2011), the Turkish Academy of Sciences (2012) and Turkish Historical Society, a member of the Foundation for International Studies, the Societas Iranologica Europeae and Austrian-Turkish Forum of Sciences.

== Research ==
Ortaylı published numerous articles focused on diplomacy, cultural history and intellectual history. Some examples are:

- Ottoman History
- Russian History (e.g. "Romanovs and Constantinople" and "19th-century Russian Empire")
- Ottoman-Habsburg Relations
- German Influence in the 19th century Ottoman Empire (as his masters degree thesis)
- Travel writing In the Ottoman Empire
- History of Turkish Drama

He also published articles on urban history including Latins of the Pera district of the Constantinople for Istanbul and various historical cities which were once under the Ottoman influence; history of provincial administration focusing on the transformation of institutions in the Ottoman Empire from the beginning to the 19th century.

== Views ==
Ortaylı supported the transition to the Latin alphabet in 1928 to facilitate education, but at the same time, he strongly opposed the policy of linguistic elimination and cultural purification against the heritage and Middle Eastern-influenced vocabulary that became at the core of the Turkish language.

== Personal life ==
He grew up trilingual, learning German from his father and Russian from his mother. As a polyglot historian he was proficient in Turkish, German, Italian, English, French, Arabic, Persian, Ottoman Turkish, Russian, and Latin.

Ortaylı was married to Ayşe Özdolay (born 1950) between 1981 and 1999. From this marriage, the couple has a daughter, Tuna Ortaylı Kazıcı (born 1982).

His biography Time Does not Disappear: Book of İlber Ortaylı (Turkish: Zaman Kaybolmaz: İlber Ortaylı Kitabı) was published in February 2006. The book includes a long journalistic conversation with Nilgün Uysal, passages from his childhood, student years in Ankara, Vienna and Chicago, his then recent reflections on near history events and anecdotes from the years when he worked as a tour guide all over Turkey.

During his studies in Turkey, he worked as a tour guide, which, according to him, influenced his approach to history. It cultivated his apprehension in practice and gave him an opportunity "to teach history" to different groups of people with various backgrounds. He credits his experiences as a travel guide in his writing of "popular history" books and essays.

Ortaylı wrote columns for the daily Hürriyet.

== Death ==
Ortaylı died in Istanbul on 13 March 2026, at the age of 78, after being treated in an intensive care unit for some time. He was buried in the Fatih Mosque Graveyard following a memorial ceremony at Galatasaray University and the religious service at Fatih Mosque. Many prominent figures and politicians attended his funeral.

== Awards and honors ==
- 2001: Aydın Doğan Award in the field of history, from the Aydın Doğan Foundation, for his works, articles, and books published since the early 1970s, his efforts to popularize the science of history, his activities to make history beloved by Turkish people of all ages, his scientific activities abroad, and his significant international role in Turkish historiography, in addition to his work Osmanlı Tarihinde Aile (Family in Ottoman History).
- 2005: Order of the Star of Italian Solidarity
- 2006: Il Lazio tra Europa e Mediterraneo
- 2007: Medal of Pushkin for his "great contribution to the spread and study of the Russian language, the preservation of cultural heritage and the rapprochement and mutual enrichment of different nations’ and people's cultures" under a decree signed by Vladimir Putin and announced officially by the Kremlin, the ceremony took place at the Russian Consulate in Istanbul.
- 2010: Austrian Decoration for Science and Art
- 2011: Officier des Arts et des Lettres
- 2016: Officer of the Order of the Star of Italy
- 2017: Turkish Presidential Culture and Arts Grand Awards

== Bibliography ==
- Tanzimat'tan Sonra Mahalli İdareler (Provincial administration after Tanzimat) (1974)
- Türkiye'de Belediyeciliğin Evrimi (Evolution of municipality in Turkey; with İlhan Tekeli, 1978)
- Türkiye İdare Tarihi (Administrative history of Turkey) (1979)
- Osmanlı İmparatorluğunda Alman Nüfuzu (German influence in the Ottoman Empire) (1980)
- Gelenekten Geleceğe (From tradition to the future) (1982)
- İmparatorluğun En Uzun Yüzyılı (The longest century of the Empire) (1983)
- Tanzimat'tan Cumhuriyet'e Yerel Yönetim Geleneği (Local administration tradition from Tanzimat to the Republic) (1985)
- İstanbul'dan Sayfalar (Pages from Istanbul) (1986)
- Studies on Ottoman Transformation (1994)
- Hukuk ve İdare Adamı Olarak Osmanlı Devletinde Kadı (Kadıs as a legal and administrative figures in the Ottoman State) (1994)
- Türkiye İdare Tarihine Giriş (Introduction to the history of Turkish administration) (1996)
- Osmanlı Toplumunda Aile (Family in Ottoman Society) (2000)
- Osmanlı İmparatorluğu'nda İktisadi ve Sosyal Değişim (Economic and social change in the Ottoman Empire) (2001)
- Osmanlı Barışı (Ottoman peace) (2004)
- Osmanlı’yı Yeniden Keşfetmek 1 and 2 (Rediscovering the Ottoman Empire) (2006)
- Kırk Ambar Sohbetleri (Kırk ambar conversations) (2006)
- Eski Dünya Seyahatnamesi (Travelogue of the old world) (2007)
- Topkapı Palace: Milestones in Ottoman History (2007, Blue Dome Press)
- Ottoman Studies (2012, Tarih Vakfı)
- Private and Royal Life in the Ottoman Palace (2014, Blue Dome Press)
