= Adelheid Gnaiger =

Austrian architect

Adelheild Gnaiger (1916–1991) was an Austrian architect. She studied at the Vienna Institute of Technology, now TU Wien, graduating in 1937. After working in an office in Zurich, she took her licensing exams in 1950 to found her own office. She was the first woman to head her own architectural practice in Vorarlberg. Her office worked on civic and private commissions, including banks, schools and public buildings. She was the architect of the ... and also designed of a number of private residences. Her architecture, defined by a style that negotiated between modern architecture and tradition, influenced the architecture of Vorarlberg in the post-war period. Her life and work was the subject of Ingrid Holzschuh's book Adelheid Gnaiger. Die erste Architektin Vorarlbergs (Adelheid Gneiger. First Architect of Vorarlberg) with contributions by a number of notable Austrian art historians. The book was published in collaboration with the vorarlberg museum.
