= Cupid and the Graces =

Cycle of paintings by Angelica Kauffman

Cupid and the Graces is a cycle of six paintings by Angelica Kauffman, produced in the late 1770s during her stay in Great Britain.

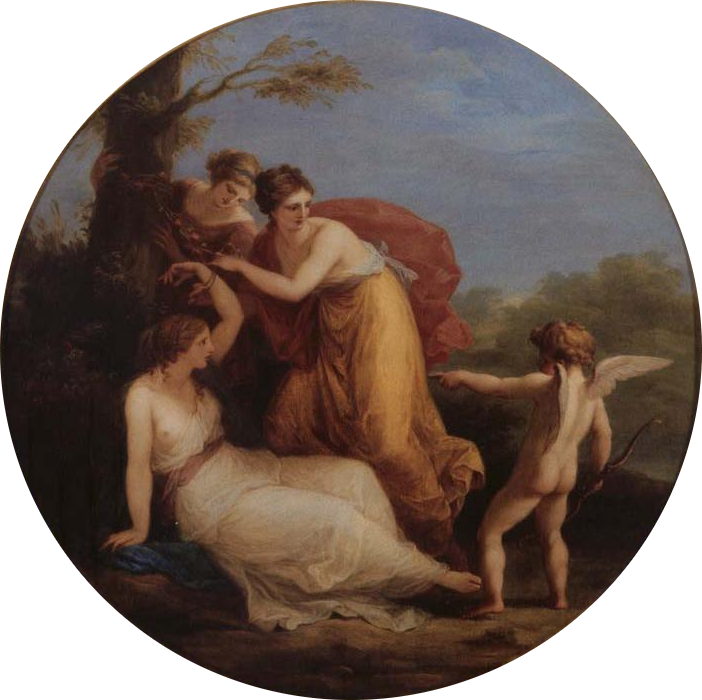
Cupid Ties One of the Graces to a Tree (vorarlberg Museum)

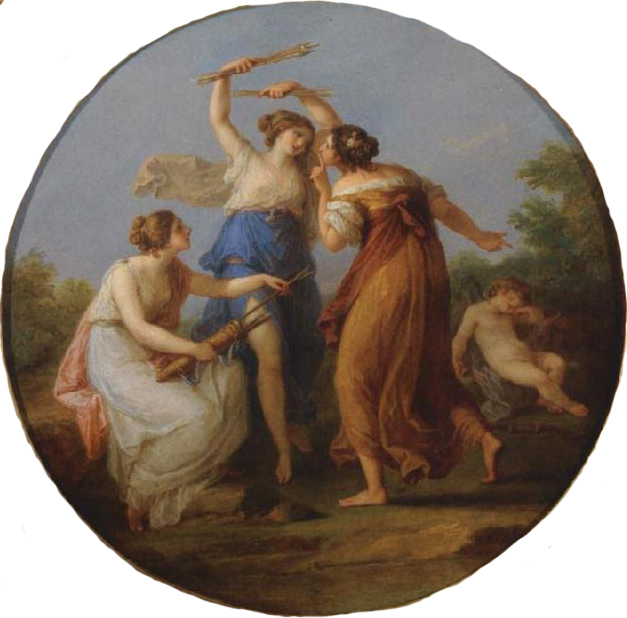
Cupid Will No Longer Seduce Hearts (vorarlberg Museum)

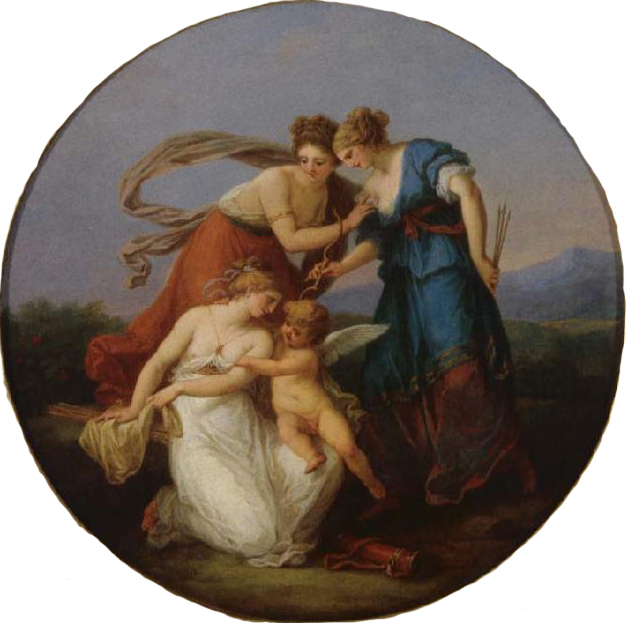
Cupid Fights the Graces for his Arrows (vorarlberg Museum)

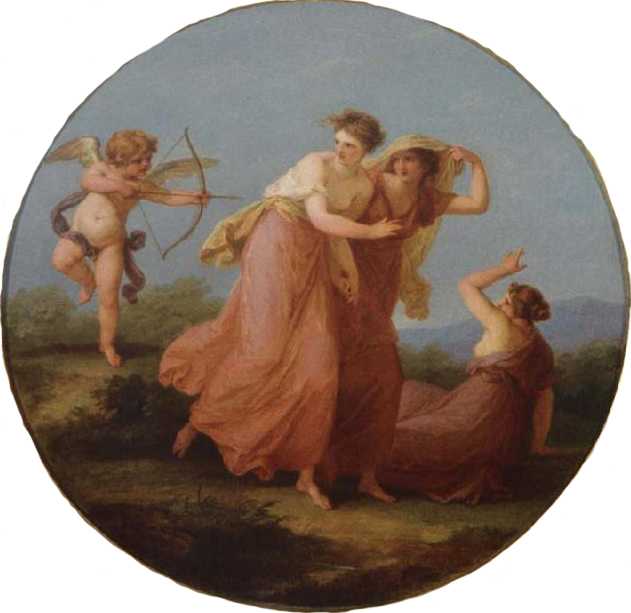
Cupid's Revenge (vorarlberg Museum)

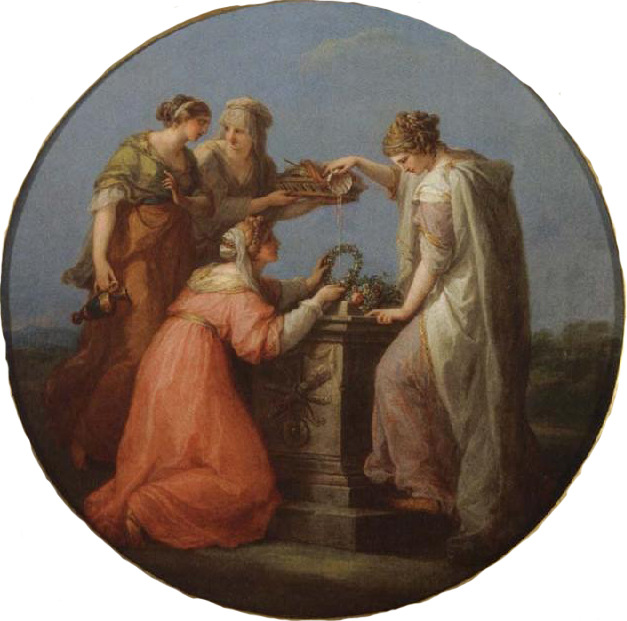
A Victim of Love (vorarlberg Museum)

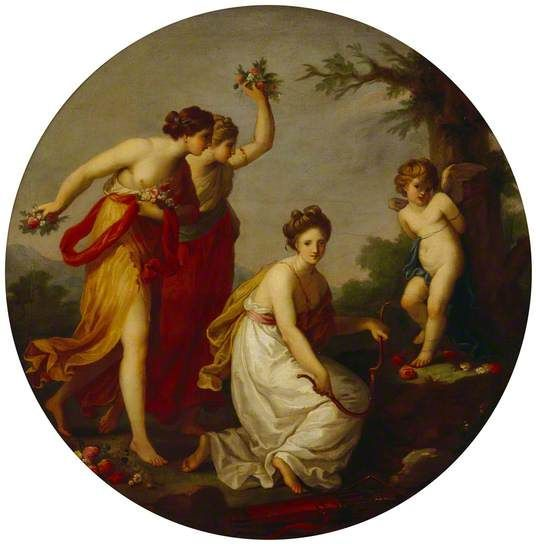
The Disarming of Cupid, The Punishment of Cupid, Cupid Bound by Nymphs, Cupid in the Pillory or Cupid Tied to a Tree by the Graces (private collection)

== See also ==
- List of paintings by Angelica Kauffman
