= The Bride of the Wind =

Painting by Oskar Kokoschka

- Artist: Oskar Kokoschka
- Year: 1913–1914
- Medium: oil on canvas
- Dimensions: 181 cm × 220 cm (71 in × 87 in)
- Location: Kunstmuseum Basel, Basel

The Bride of the Wind (Die Windsbraut), also called The Tempest, is an oil on canvas painting by Austrian painter Oskar Kokoschka, from 1913–1914. It is held in the Kunstmuseum Basel.

== History and description ==
Kokoschka's best known work, it is an allegorical picture featuring a self-portrait by the artist, lying alongside his lover Alma Mahler.

In 1912, Kokoschka first met Alma Mahler, the recently widowed wife of composer Gustav Mahler. A passionate romance ensued, with the artist producing numerous drawings and paintings of his muse. The painting depicts Alma in a peaceful sleep beside Kokoschka, who is awake and stares into space. The couple's break-up in 1914 had a profound effect on Kokoschka, whose expressive brushwork grew more turbulent.

When Kokoschka painted the picture, poet Georg Trakl visited him almost daily and extolled the painting in his poem Die Nacht (The Night).
