= Errant Husbands =

1931 film

- Directed by: Carl Heinz Wolff
- Written by: Franz Rauch
- Based on: Play by Oskar Justinus and Heinrich Wilken
- Produced by: Carl Heinz Wolff
- Starring: Max Adalbert; Hansi Arnstaedt; Henry Bender
- Cinematography: Alfred Hansen; Georg Muschner
- Music by: Austin Egen; Bert Reisfeld
- Production company: Carl Heinz Wolff-Filmproduktion
- Release date: 7 September 1931
- Running time: 87 minutes
- Country: Germany
- Language: German

Errant Husbands (German: Kyritz - Pyritz) is a 1931 German comedy film directed by Carl Heinz Wolff and starring Max Adalbert, Hansi Arnstaedt and Henry Bender.

== Cast ==
- Max Adalbert as Dr. Peter Liezow, Bürgermeister
- Hansi Arnstaedt as Henriette
- Henry Bender as Anton Piepenberg, Apotheker
- Magda Elgen as Tusnelda
- Paul Hörbiger as Otto Rux, Weinhändler
- Lotte Stein as Ulrike
- Harry Halm as Fritz Ebert
- Gustl Gstettenbaur as Emil, Lietzows Neffe
- Otti Dietze as Frau Soltmann, Pensionsinhaberin
- Lilian Ellis as Anni, ihre Nichte
- Eugen Rex as Wilhelm Klobig, Stadtkapellmeister
- Paul Westermeier as Waldemar Schwefelmann, Schneider
- Paul Heidemann as Emil Nauke, Friseur
- Hermann Picha as Hausdiener

== Bibliography ==
- Churton, Tobias. Aleister Crowley: The Beast in Berlin: Art, Sex, and Magick in the Weimar Republic. Simon and Schuster, 2014.
- Klaus, Ulrich J. Deutsche Tonfilme: Jahrgang 1931. Klaus-Archiv, 2006.
