= Hans Tietze =

Austrian art historian (1880-1954)

Hans Tietze (1 May 1880 – 11 April 1954) was an Austrian art historian. He was a member of the Vienna School of Art History.

== Life and work ==
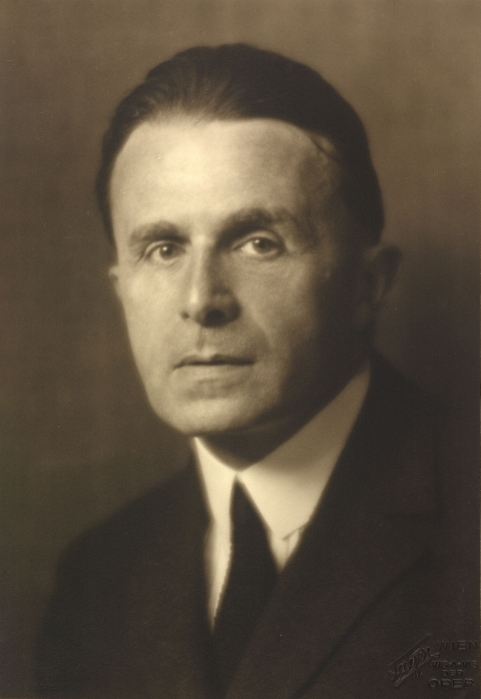
Tietze in 1927

Tietze was born on 1 May 1880 in Prague, Bohemia, into the family of a Jewish lawyer. He grew up in Prague in a German-speaking environment. In 1893, his family moved to Vienna, Austria. From 1900 to 1903, he studied archaeology, history and art history under Alois Riegl, Julius von Schlosser and Franz Wickhoff at the University of Vienna. In 1903, he completed his Ph.D. dissertation, supervised by Wickhoff, on the topic of medieval typological representation. In 1905, he wrote his Habilitationsschrift on Annibale Caracci's frescos at the Palazzo Farnese.

In 1905, he married fellow art-history student Erika Conrat. For some time, he was Wickhoff's assistant at Vienna's first art historical institute chaired by Josef Strzygowski. He also became an assistant and secretary at the Commission for Monument Preseveration. In 1909, he was appointed lecturer in art history at the University of Vienna. After World War I he became assistant professor and began editing the art journal, Die bildenden Künste. In 1913, he published his Methode der Kunstgeschichte, which "attempted to summarize the basic principles of the evolutionist methodological project developed by Franz Wickhoff and Alois Riegl and articulated explicitly by Max Dvořák." From 1923 to 1925, Tietze helped reorganizing Vienna's traditional art museum system into a more popular and pedagogical one. For instance, he combined the print collection of the Hofbibliothek into the Albertina collection and created the Belvedere galleries, consisting of the baroque museum, the 19th-century museum and the 20th-century art museum. He also wrote radio broadcasts on art.

Tietze supported modern art, joining the Gesellschaft zur Förderung der modernen Kunst in Wien (Association for the Promotion of Modern Art in Vienna), but also wrote groundbreaking studies on Albrecht Dürer and Venetian renaissance art. For instance, in Tintoretto: The Paintings and Drawings (1948) the Venetian painter is portrayed as a Baroque artist and the dominant figure in the transition from the High Renaissance, as a "modern artist, clothed in the grab of the Classic Art".

In 1932 and 1935, Tietze was a visiting lecturer in the USA. After the annexation of Austria by the Nazis in 1938, he and his wife went to London and then to the United States, where he was appointed visiting professor at the Toledo Museum of Art in 1938–1939. In 1940, he settled as a private scholar in New York City, where he wrote introductions to some museum catalogs and "great art" surveys for the general public.

Among his students in Vienna were Ernst Gombrich, Otto Kurz and Fritz Grossmann. His son is the turcologist Andreas Tietze.

In 1965, the Tietzestraße in Vienna was named in honor of Tietze's memory. The "Tietze Galleries for Prints and Drawings" at the Albertina, Vienna, are also named after the art historian.

== Select publications ==
- Die illuminierten Handschriften in Salzburg. Leipzig 1905.
- Die Denkmale des Benediktinerstiftes St. Peter in Salzburg. Vienna 1913.
- Die Methode der Kunstgeschichte. Leipzig 1913.
- Die Entführung von Wiener Kunstwerken nach Italien. Eine Darlegung unseres Rechtsstandpunktes, mit einem offenen Brief an die italienischen Fachgenossen von Max Dvořák. Vienna 1919.
- Deutsche Graphik der Gegenwart. Leipzig 1922 (Bibliothek der Kunstgeschichte, 37).
- Domenico Martinelli und seine Tätigkeit in Österreich. Vienna 1922.
- Die Zukunft der Wiener Museen. Vienna 1923.
- "Geisteswissenschaftliche Kunstgeschichte". In Johannes Jahn, ed., Die Kunstwissenschaft der Gegenwart in Selbstdarstellungen. Leipzig 1924, pp. 183–198.
- Lebendige Kunstwissenschaft. Zur Krise der Kunst und Kunstgeschichte. Vienna 1925.
- Kritisches Verzeichnis der Werke Albrecht Dürers, Vol. 1. Augsburg 1928.
- Die Kunst in unserer Zeit. Vienna 1930.
- Gerhart Frankl. Vienna 1930.
- Wien: Kultur – Kunst – Geschichte. Vienna and Leipzig 1931.
- Geschichte und Beschreibung des Stephansdomes in Wien. Vienna 1931.
- Die Juden Wiens: Geschichte – Wirtschaft – Kultur. Vienna and Leipzig 1933.
- Tizian: Leben und Werk. Vienna 1936.
- Kritisches Verzeichnis der Werke Albrecht Dürers, Vol. 2. Basel and Leipzig 1937-38.
- (with Erica Tietze-Conrat), The Drawings of the Venetian Painters in the 15th and 16th Centuries, New York 1944.
- Tintoretto: The Paintings and Drawings. London 1948.
- Dürer als Zeichner und Aquarellist. Vienna 1951.
