= Tobias G. Natter =

Austrian art historian (born 1961)

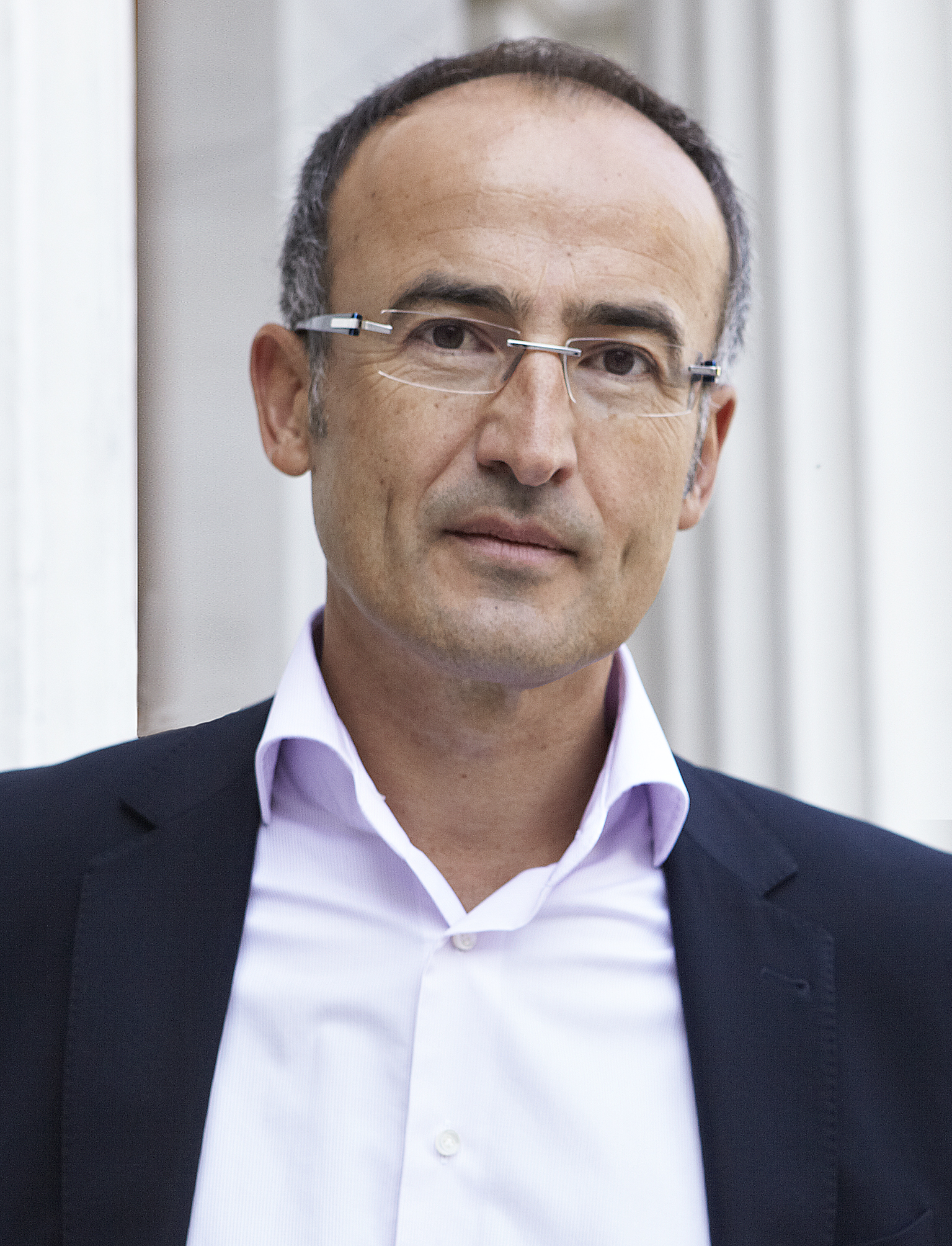
Tobias G. Natter

Tobias G. Natter (born 26 May 1961 in Dornbirn, Vorarlberg) is an Austrian art historian, curator and art consultant. His main areas of expertise are 19th and 20th-century Austrian art, particularly the work of Gustav Klimt, Egon Schiele, and "Vienna 1900". He has hold positions at several institutions, including the Belvedere Gallery in Vienna, the Vorarlberg Museum and the Leopold Museum. Since 2014, he is working as an independent art expert.

Natter is regarded as one of Austria´s "most prominent art historians and exhibition curators". He combines art-historical research with many years of museum experienceand an extensive international exhibition record. As a guest curator, he has workedwith numerous major Austrian and international art institutions. In addition, through his catalogues raisonnés, exhibition catalogues and scholarly publications, he has made significant contributions to the research and interpretation of Austrian art around 1900.

== Career ==
Tobias G. Natter studied at the universities of Innsbruck, Munich, and Vienna, earning his doctorate (Dr. phil.) in Innsbruck in 1988. From 1988 to 1991, he worked as a researcher at the Wien Museum. In 1991, he joined the Österreichische Galerie Belvedere, where he remained until 2005, ultimately serving as Chief Curator. At the same time, he served as an advisor and guest curator to the Jewish Museum Vienna, which had been re-established in 1990. In 2001–2002, Natter worked with the Neue Galerie in New York, where he conceived its first loan exhibition. This marked the beginning of an international curatorial career that subsequently took him to exhibition venues across Europe, the United States, and Japan.

In 2006, Natter was appointed Director of the Vorarlberg Museum in Bregenz. In this capacity, he oversaw the institution’s conceptual and museological reorientation, including the development of a new institutional vision in conjunction with the construction of its new museum building.

In September 2011, Natter was appointed Curatorial Director of the Leopold Museum in Vienna. During his tenure, he developed a distinctive exhibition program that attracted considerable international attention, most notably with Naked Men (2012–2013). In October 2013, he resigned following a dispute over the newly established Gustav Klimt / Vienna around 1900 Private Foundation. The controversy centered on the dual role of Commercial Director Peter Weinhäupl, who had also assumed the chairmanship of the Foundation’s Board. Natter objected to this overlap in responsibilities, which he regarded as giving rise to a structural conflict of interest.

In 2014, Natter founded the agency Natter Fine Arts, establishing himself as an independent art expert and consultant. His work encompasses the conception and realization of exhibitions, art-historical assessments, provenance research and reporting, as well as the appraisal and valuation of individual works of art and entire collections. As a generally sworn and court-certified expert, he has been entrusted with the assessment and valuation of several major artistic estates, including those of Maria Lassnig (1919–2014), Ernst Fuchs (1930–2015), and Anton Lehmden (1929–2018).

Over the course of his career, Natter has served on various art commissions. He worked on behalf of leading art institutions in Austria, Germany, Italy, France, the United Kingdom, the Tate in London, Musée d’Orsay in Paris, Fine Arts Museums of San Francisco, Neue Galerie New York, and Kunsthaus Zürich.

Alongside his curatorial practice, Natter is the author and editor of numerous exhibition catalogues, monographs, and scholarly essays. In 2012, he edited Gustav Klimt: All Paintings, with his commented catalogue raisonné of Klimt’s painted oeuvre. In 2017 there followed the catalogue raisonné of Egon Schiele’s paintings, thereby providing fundamental scholarly surveys of the painted works of both artists. His 2003 monograph on the collectors and patrons of Gustav Klimt, Egon Schiele, and Oskar Kokoschka is a reference work to the cultural history of collecting in this field. In the same year, 2003, he also published his research on the history of the Galerie Miethke, a contribution to the history of the Viennese art trade. .

Natter has also been repeatedly called upon to provide expert advice and assessments in matters of art provenance, particularly concerning works by Gustav Klimt and Egon Schiele.

== Awards ==
2018: Natter is awarded the title Professor by the Austrian Federal President.

== Books ==
On Gustav Klimt, Egon Schiele, Oskar Kokoschka, and Vienna Modernism

- Gustav Klimt and Medicine: The Flow of Life. co-edited with Christiane Druml und Markus Müller. Munich/London/New York 2026, ISBN 978-3-8195-0014-5.
- Gustav Klimt: Interiors. On behalf of the Neue Galerie New York. Prestel publishing, Munich e.a. 2023, ISBN 978-3-7913-7978-4.
- Hodler, Klimt und die Wiener Werkstätte. Edited on behalf of Kunsthaus Zürich. Scheidegger & Spiess, Zurich 2021, ISBN 978-3-03942-016-2.
- The Self-Portrait: From Schiele to Beckmann. Edited on behalf of the Neue Galerie New York. Prestel Verlag, Munich e.a. 2019, ISBN 978-3-7913-5859-8.
- Egon Schiele. Sämtliche Gemälde 1909–1918. Taschen publishing, Cologne 2017, ISBN 978-3-8365-4613-3.
- Klimt & Rodin: An Artistic Encounter. Co-edited with Max Hollein. DelMonico Books – Prestel Verlag, München u. a. 2017, ISBN 978-3-7913-5708-9.
- Klimt and Antiquity. Erotic Encounters. Co-edited with Stella Rollig. Prestel publishing, Munich e.a. 2017, ISBN 978-3-7913-5699-0.
- Klimt and The Women of Vienna’s Golden Age 1900–1918. Edited on behalf of the Neue Galerie New York. Prestel publishing, Munich e.a. 2016, ISBN 978-3-7913-5582-5.
- Art for All. The Colour Woodcut in Vienna around 1900. Co-edited with Max Hollein and Klaus Albrecht Schröder. Taschen publishing, Cologne 2016, ISBN 978-90-00-06619-3.
- Kokoschka. Das Ich im Brennpunkt. Co-edited with Franz Smola. Christian Brandstätter publishing, Vienna 2013, ISBN 978-3-85033-785-4.
- Gustav Klimt. Die Sammlung im Leopold Museum. Co-edited with Elisabeth Leopold. Hatje Cantz, Ostfildern 2013, ISBN 978-3-7757-3744-9.
- Gustav Klimt: Sämtliche Gemälde. Taschen publishing, Cologne 2012, ISBN 978-3-8365-2794-1.
- Klimt: Up Close and Personal: Paintings - Letters - Insights. Co-edited with Franz Smola and Peter Weinhäupl. Christian Brandstätter publishing, Vienna 2012, ISBN 978-3-85033-629-1.
- Gustav Klimt. Painting, Design and Modern Life. Co-edited with Christoph Grunenberg. Tate Publishing, London 2008, ISBN 978-1-85437-735-7.
- Gustav Klimt and The Dialogues of the Heterae. Erotic Boundaries in Vienna Around 1900. In: Renée Price (Ed. ): Gustav Klimt. The Ronald S. Lauder and Serge Sabarsky Collections. Prestel publishing, Munich e.a. 2007, ISBN 978-3-7913-3834-7.
- Die Tafelrunde. Egon Schiele und sein Kreis. Co-edited with Thomas Trummer. DuMont publishing, Cologne 2006, ISBN 3-8321-7700-0.
- nach Schiele. Co-edited with Thomas Trummer. DuMont publishing, Cologne 2006, ISBN 3-8321-7722-1.
- The Naked Truth: Klimt, Schiele, Kokoschka and other Scandals. Co-edited with Max Hollein. Prestel publishing, Munich e.a. 2005, ISBN 3-7913-3283-X.
- Egon Schiele and the Neulengbach Affair. In: Renée Price (Ed.): Egon Schiele. The Ronald S. Lauder und Serge Sabarsky Collection. Prestel publishing, Munich e.a. 2005, ISBN 3-7913-3390-9.
- Schiele & Roessler. Der Künstler und sein Förderer. Kunst und Networking im frühen 20. Jahrhundert. Co-edited with Storch. Hatje Cantz publishing, Ostfildern 2004, ISBN 3-7757-1479-0.
- Die Welt von Klimt, Schiele und Kokoschka. Sammler und Mäzene. DuMont publishing, Cologne 2003, ISBN 3-8321-7258-0.
- Die Galerie Miethke. Eine Kunsthandlung im Zentrum der Moderne, Wien 2003, ISBN 3-901398-32-5.
- Oskar Kokoschka. Das Moderne Bildnis 1909–1914. Edited on behalf of the Neue Galerie New York. DuMont publishing, Cologne 2001, ISBN 3-8321-7182-7.
- Klimt and the Women. Co-edited with Gerbert Frodl. DuMont publishing, Cologne 2000, ISBN 0-300-08796-9.
- Kokoschka und Wien. Selbstverlag Österreichische Galerie Belvedere, Wien 1996, ISBN 3-85202-131-6.

On the Baroque, Art History and Cultural History

- Der Himmel auf Erden. Barockentwürfe & Design. Edited on behalf of Abbey Wettingen-Mehrerau. Bad Vöslau 2023, ISBN 978-3-200-09074-3. Zweite, erweiterte und überarbeitete Auflage, Online-Veröffentlichung 2026. https://doi.org/10.11588/artdok.00010270 .
- Fürstenglanz. Die Macht der Pracht. Co-edited with Agnes Husslein-Arco. Belvedere Eigenverlag, Wien 2016, ISBN 978-3-902805-97-3.

On Vorarlberg, the Lake Constance region, and its art history

- Grüne Kuh und Ziegenbock. Das große Tier-ABC. Bilder um 1900. Edited on behalf of Sammlung Hans Bäumler, Hohenems, in Co-operation with MAK, Vienna. Hohenems 2026, ISBN 978-3-85298-259-5.
- Gustav Klimt und Vorarlberg. Edited on behalf of Sammlung Hans Bäumler. Arche Noah – Kunst & Natur, Hohenems 2025, ISBN 978-3-85298-256-4. Online published 2026. https://doi.org/10.11588/artdok.00010262 .
- Hoi b’sundrig. Große Dinge – kleine Dinge. Edited on behalf of Abbey Wettingen-Mehrerau. Hard 2025, ISBN 978-3-85298-253-3. Online published 2026. https://doi.org/10.11588/artdok.00010267 .
- Schnee. Rohstoff der Kunst. Edited on behalf of the Vorarlberger Landesmuseums. Hatje Cantz publishing, Ostfildern 2009, ISBN 978-3-7757-2430-2.
- Gold. Schatzkunst zwischen Bodensee und Chur. Edited on behalf of the Vorarlberger Landesmuseums. Hatje-Cantz publishing, Ostfildern 2008, ISBN 978-3-7757-2213-1.

International exhibition projects and other art-historical topics

- Ernst Fuchs und Arnulf Rainer. „Mein Atelier ist verwaist“. Gerettete Werke aus der Haasgasse 10. Edited on behalf of Ernst Fuchs Museums, Vienna 2025, ISBN 978-3-200-10833-2.
- Wolken. Welt des Flüchtigen. Co-edited with Franz Smola. Hatje Cantz publishing, Ostfildern 2013, ISBN 978-3-9503018-4-7.
- nude men. from 1800 to the present day. Co-edited with Elisabeth Leopold. Hirmer publishing, Munich 2012, ISBN 978-3-7774-5851-9.
- Das Schaudepot. Zwischen offenem Magazin und Inszenierung. Cop-edited with Michael Fehr and Bettina Habsburg-Lothringen. transcript publishing, Bielefeld 2010, ISBN 978-3-8376-1616-3.
- Angelika Kaufmann: A Woman of Immense Talent. Edith on behalf of the Vorarlberger Landesmuseums. Hatje-Cantz publishing, Ostfildern 2007, ISBN 978-3-7757-1984-1.
- Chaim Soutine. Ein französischer Expressionist. Edited on behalf of Jüdisches Museum Wien. Vienna 2000, ISBN 3-901398-12-0.
- Max Liebermann und die französischen Impressionisten. Co-edited with Julius H. Schoeps. DuMont publishing, Cologne 1997, ISBN 3-7701-4294-2.
- aufBRÜCHE. Österreichische Malerei und Plastik der 50er Jahre. Edited on behalf of Österreichische Galerie Belvedere. Vienna 1994, ISBN 3-901508-00-7.
