= Andreas Tietze =

Austrian Turkologist (1914–2003)

- Born: April 26, 1914; Vienna, Austria
- Died: December 22, 2003 (aged 89); Vienna, Austria
- Spouse: Süheyla Uyar
- Parent(s): Hans Tietze; Erica Tietze-Conrat

Academic background
- Education: University of Vienna
- Thesis: Die Stellungnahme der italienischen Wirtschaftstheoretiker des 17. Jahrhunderts zu den agrarischen Problemen (1937)

Andreas Tietze (April 26, 1914 – December 22, 2003) was an Austrian scholar of Turkish lexicography and language.

== Biography ==
Tietze was born on April 26, 1914, in the early months of World War I to art historians Hans Tietze and Erica Tietze-Conrat.

He studied at the University of Vienna, focusing on economic history under Alfons Dopsch, as well as East European and Balkan history and Slavic, Turkic, Persian, and Arabic languages. He received his doctorate in 1937 with the thesis Die Stellungnahme der italienischen Wirtschaftstheoretiker des 17. Jahrhunderts zu den agrarischen Problemen.

Prior to receiving his doctorate, Tietze had already traveled to Turkey. Due to his Jewish background, the rise in Antisemitism caused him to move to Turkey in 1937. His parents relocated to the United States in 1938 for the same reason. In Turkey, Tietze accepted an offer to teach German and English at Istanbul University.

While in Turkey, Tietze furthered his studies of Turkish, publishing a Turkish reader for beginners in 1943 and serving on the editorial committee for the revised edition of James Redhouse's Turkish dictionary. In 1952, Tietze's reputation as a linguist led to an invitation to the University of Illinois. In 1957 he accepted Gustave E. von Grunebaum's invitation to join the new Near East Center at the University of California, Los Angeles. In 1974, Tietze returned to the University of Vienna to direct their Oriental Institute. While there he published translated and annotated editions of Ottoman court texts and founded the journal Turkologischer Anzeiger (ISSN 0255-5425) in an attempt to compile a bibliography of the growing number of works on Turkology.

Tietze retired from the University of Vienna in 1984, but continued to work. At age 80 he began work on an etymological dictionary of Turkish. The first volume was published in 2002. At the time of his death in 2003, he was working on the letter "S"; the remaining volumes were published posthumously.

== Selected works ==
- Tietze, Andreas (1943). Türkisches Lesebuch für Auslaender [Turkish reader for foreigners] (in German). Istanbul. OCLC 13786851.
- Tietze, Andreas, ed. (1968). Redhouse yeni Türkçe-İngilizce sözlük: New Redhouse Turkish-English dictionary. İstanbul: Redhouse Yayınevi. OCLC 378049.
- Âli, Mustafa bin Ahmet (1975). Tietze, Andreas (ed.). Mustafa Ali's Description of Cairo of 1599: text, transliteration, translation, notes. Wien: Verl. d. Österr. Akad. d. Wiss. ISBN 9783700101192. OCLC 2523612.
- Âli, Mustafa bin Ahmet (1979). Tietze, Andreas (ed.). Mustafā Ali's Counsel for sultans of 1581: edition, translation, notes. Wien: Verlag der Österreichische Akademie der Wissenschaften. ISBN 9783700102885. OCLC 8196221.
- Tietze, Andreas (2002). Tarihi ve etimolojik Türkiye Türkçesi lugatı: Sprachgeschichtliches und etymologisches Wörterbuch des Türkei-Türkischen [Historical and etymological dictionary of Turkey Turkish] (in Turkish and German). Simurg. ISBN 9789757172567. OCLC 54096158.
