= Ilse Twardowski-Conrat =

Austrian sculptor

Ilse von Twardowski
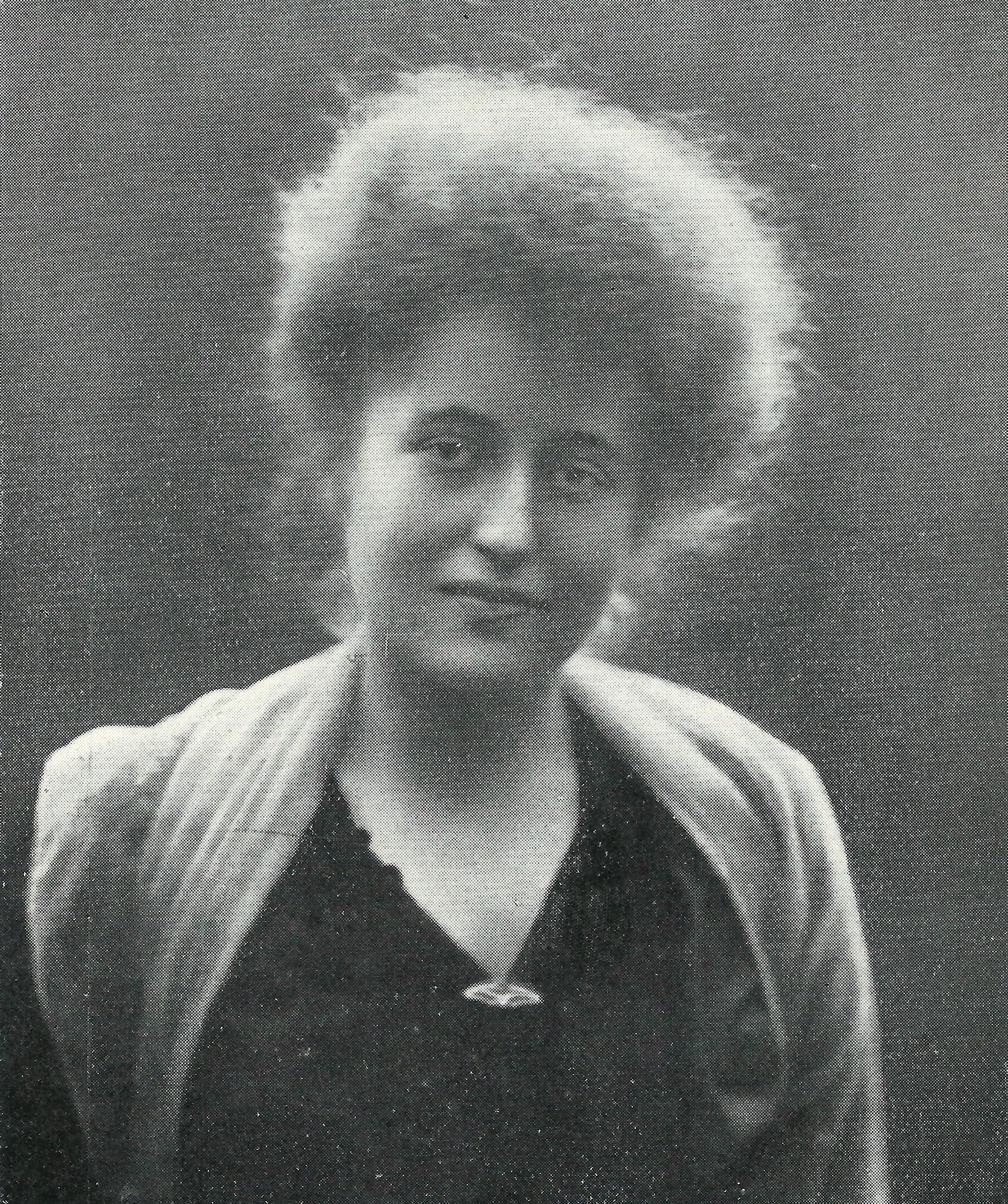
- Born: Ilse Beatrix Amalia Cohn; 1880; Vienna, Austria-Hungary
- Died: 1942 (aged 61–62); Munich, Nazi Germany
- Other name: Ilse Conrat
- Occupation: Sculptor
- Spouse: GenMaj. Ernst August Dobrogast von Twardowski (d. 1928)

Ilse von Twardowski or Ilse Twardowski-Conrat (1880–1942) was an Austrian sculptor. She created many noted sculptures. She took her own life in 1942 as a result of the Holocaust.

== Life ==
Twardowski was born in Vienna in 1880. Her father was a merchant who converted from the Jewish faith in 1882 together with his family. Her father changed his name from Hugh Cohn to Hugh Conrat. His brother who became a leading bacteriologist, Ferdinand Cohn, kept his birth name. Her sister, Erica Tietze-Conrat, was one of the first women to study art history, a strong supporter of contemporary art in Vienna and an art historian specializing in Renaissance art and the Venetian school drawings.

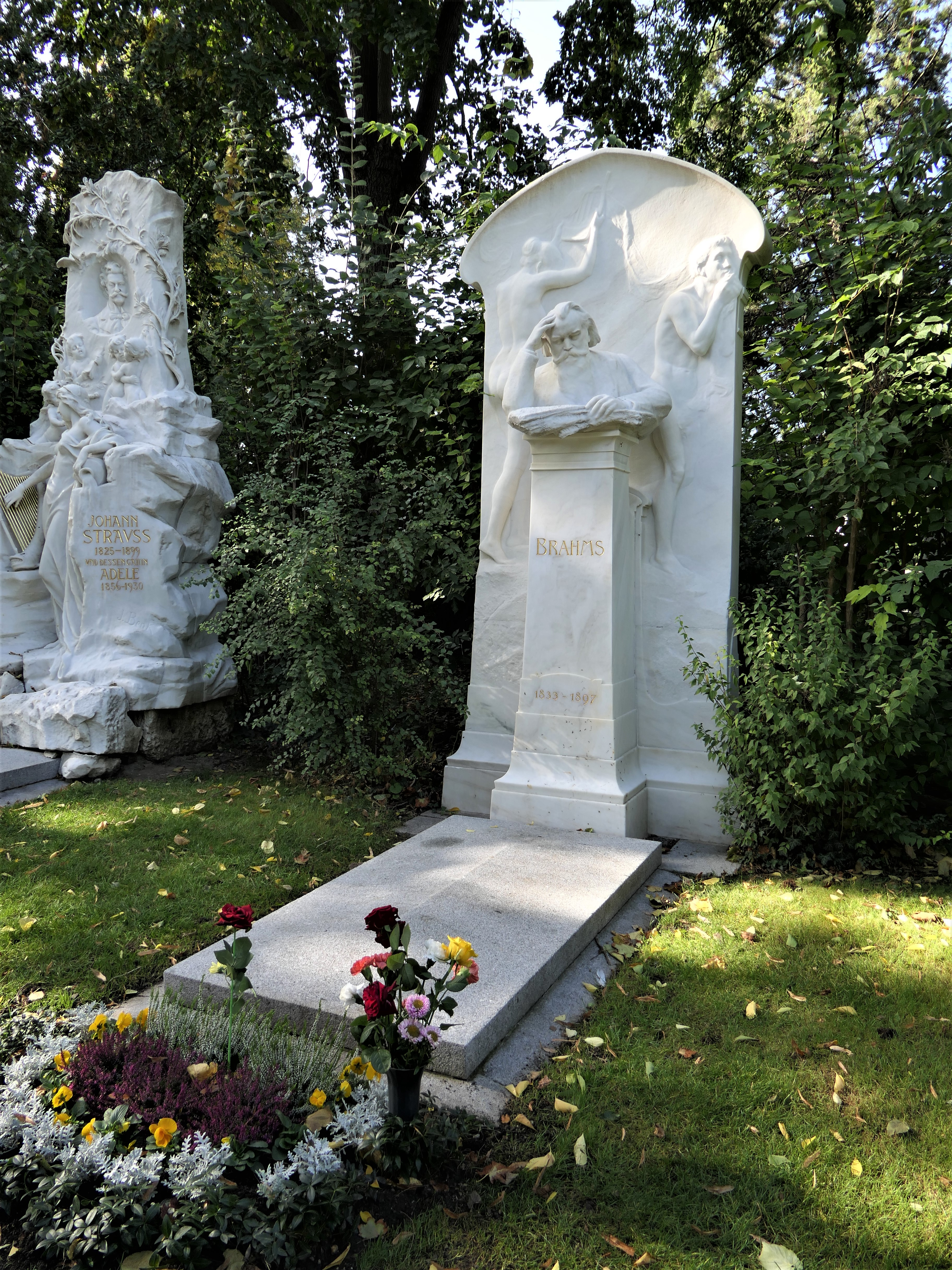
Brahms's grave in the Zentralfriedhof (Central Cemetery), Vienna by Twardowski.

Twardowski became a leading sculptor after training with Josef Breitner and Charles van der Stappen. One of her commissions was the gravestone for Johannes Brahms whom she had known. Another early commission was for Empress Elisabeth of Austria. She exhibited in 1909 in the "8 women artists" exhibition. She joined the Austrian Association of Women Artists (VBKÖ) which was founded in 1910 and that year she was chosen to create a funerary monument for her teacher Charles van der Stappen.

In 1935 she was told that she could no longer practice her art in Munich. She had to sell her large studio and move out to the suburbs.

Twardowski took her own life in Munich in 1942 after receiving orders to join other Jews during the time of the Holocaust.

== Legacy ==
Her work was included in the 2019 exhibition City Of Women: Female artists in Vienna from 1900 to 1938 at the Österreichische Galerie Belvedere.
