= Erica Tietze-Conrat =

Austrian art historian (1883–1958)

- Born: Erica Conrat; June 20, 1883; Vienna, Austria
- Died: December 12, 1958 (aged 75); New York City, U.S.
- Other names: Erica Cohn, Erica Tietze
- Education: University of Vienna
- Occupations: Art historian, researcher, lecturer
- Spouse: Hans Tietze

Erica Tietze-Conrat (née Erika Conrat, also known as Erica Tietze; born June 20, 1883 – died December 12, 1958) was an Austrian-born American art historian, one of the first women to study art history, a strong supporter of contemporary art in Vienna and an art historian specializing in Renaissance art and the Venetian school drawings.

== Life ==
Erica Conrat was born June 20, 1883, in Vienna, Austria. She came from a prominent Jewish family in Vienna, which had converted to Protestantism. She was the youngest of three sisters, and the oldest, Ilse Twardowski-Conrat was a sculptor. The father Hugo Conrat (also known as Hugo Cohn) was an avid music lover and friends of Johannes Brahms. Erica was highly musical, played the piano and was among others friends with Alexander von Zemlinsky and Arnold Schoenberg, through which they met Karl Kraus. They also shared a long-standing friendship with Alma Mahler.

Erica Conrat studied art history at the University of Vienna from 1902 until 1905 under Franz Wickhoff and Alois Riegl and in 1905 received her doctorate with dissertation contributions to the history of Georg Raphael Donner. She was the first woman who completed the study of art history at the University of Vienna with a doctorate. In the same year Erica married fellow student Hans Tietze, he was also studying art history during the same time. This was the first "Vienna School" art history program. European universities discriminated even more blatantly against women scholars at the time than they do now, and apparently Erica's husband did not foster her independent research but rather expected her to help with his and cook for him as well. Between 1908 and 1910 the Tietzes had four children.

Erica and Hans Tietze were friends with many contemporary artists including Oskar Kokoschka who was commissioned to paint them in 1909, the portrait is now at the Museum of Modern Art in New York. The sculptor Georg Ehrlich created two bronze busts of Hans and Erica Tietze which are now in the Österreichische Galerie Belvedere in Vienna, as well as numerous portrait drawings of Erica Tietze.

In 1938 the couple emigrated to the U.S. for political reasons during World War II, Erica Tietze worked as a researcher, academic lecturer at Columbia University and published art historical publications on Renaissance artists as well as contemporary Vienna artists until her death.

In 1970, a room at the Austrian Museum of Baroque Art was named in Erica Tietze-Conrat’s honor for her contributions to the study of Austrian artists.

In the fall of 2004, the International Hans Tietze and Erica Tietze-Conrat Society founded in Vienna, which has taken the care of the complete works of art historian-married couple to the task. The son of the couple is the Turcologist, Andreas Tietze.

== Works ==
- "The Art of Woman. An epilogue to the exhibition at the Vienna Secession", in: Journal of Fine Art, NF 22, 1911, pp. 146–148.
- Austrian Baroque Sculpture, Vienna 1920.
- Oskar Laske, Vienna 1921.
- Andrea Mantegna, Leipzig 1923.
- The French engraving of the Renaissance, Munich 1925.
- The Drawings of the Venetian Painters in the 15th and 16th Centuries, New York 1944 (with Hans Tietze)
- Mantegna. Paintings, Drawings, Engravings, London 1955.
- Georg Ehrlich, London 1956.
- Dwarfs and Jesters in Art, London 1957.

== Literature ==
- Essays in Honor of Hans Tietze, Paris, 1958 (with a complete bibliography of the writings of Hans Tietze and Erica Tietze-Conrat).
- Almut Krapf-Weiler: "Erica Tietze Conrat (1883–1958) and Alma Mahler-Schindler (1879–1964), an encounter", in: Without smoke goes nothing! A Festschrift for the 50th birthday of Dr. Peter Rauch, Vienna, Cologne and Weimar 1992, p 77–84.
- Almut Krapf-Weiler: "'Lion and Owl'. Hans Tietze and Erica Tietze-Conrat – a biographical sketch", in: Belvedere, 1, 1999, pp. 64–83.
- Almut Krapf-Weiler (ed.): Erica Tietze-Conrat. The woman in the science of art. Texts 1906–1958, Vienna, 2007.
- Ulrike Wendland: Biographical Handbook of German art historians in exile. Life and work of the persecuted and exiled under Nazism scientists. Saur, Munich, 1999, vol. 2, p 679-703

== See also ==
- Women in the art history field
