= Vorarlberg museum =

vorarlberg museum
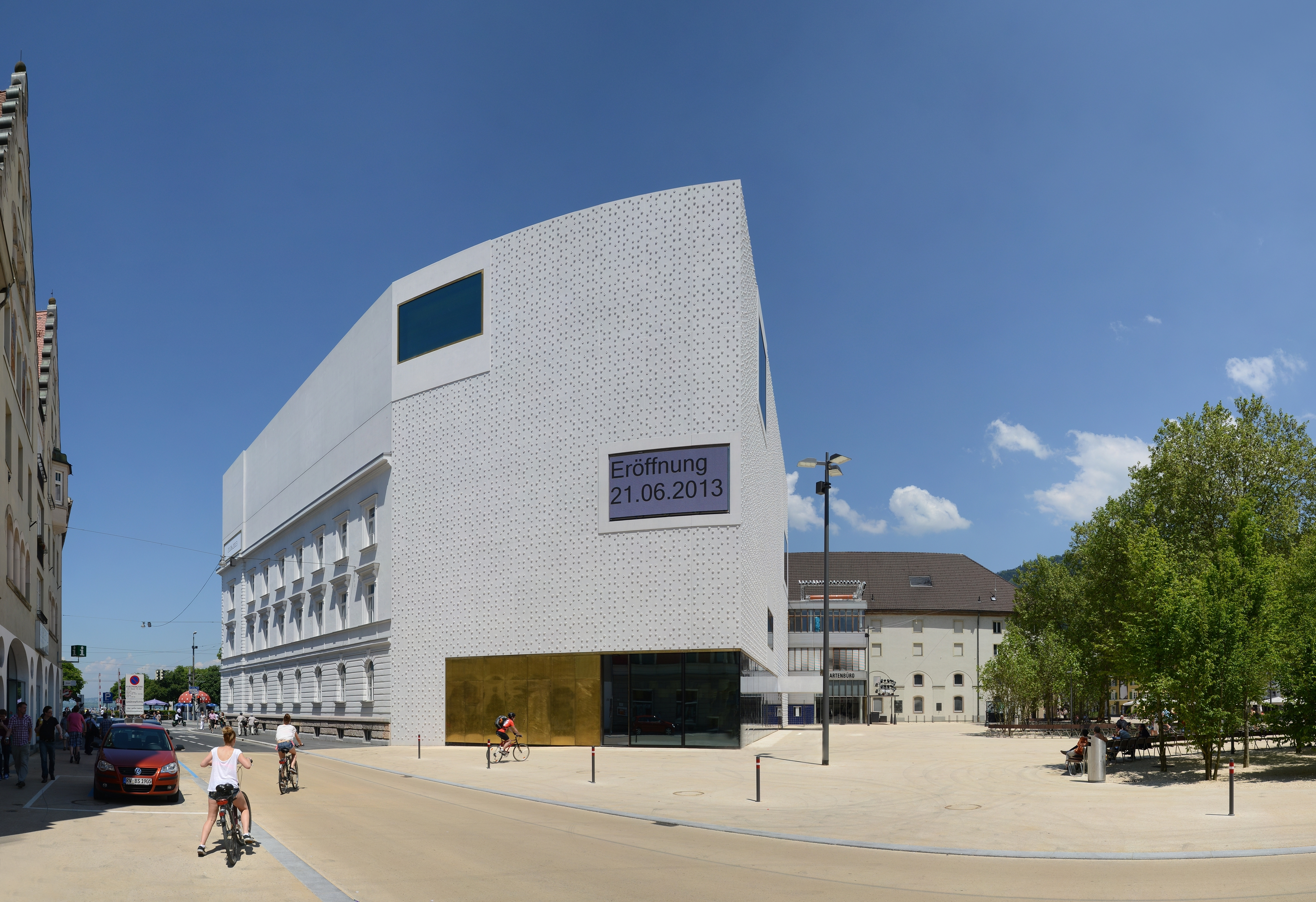
- Former name: VLM - Vorarlberger Landesmuseum
- Established: 1857
- Location: Bregenz, Vorarlberg, Austria
- Coordinates: 47°30′16″N 9°44′48″E
- Type: Art, History, Archeology and Folklore
- Director: Michael Kasper
- Curators: Gerhard Grabher (Archaeology); Ute Pfanner, Kathrin Dünser (Arts); Theresia Anwander (Ethnology)
- Architect: Cukrowicz Nachbaur Architekten
- Website: www.vorarlbergmuseum.at

First building of 1905

The vorarlberg museum (former name Vorarlberger Landesmuseum) in Bregenz is the state art and cultural museum of the Austrian federal state of Vorarlberg.

It was founded in 1857, and has since been a centre for collection and preservation of the state's art and cultural material. The museum conducts research into this material and makes it available to the public. In terms of content, the museum's work focuses on Vorarlberg material, and at the same time considers this in a context which goes beyond the state's boundaries. The collection contains 150,000 artifacts from archaeology, history, history of art and folklore.

The museum co-operates with other national, international and regional cultural institutions and aims at supporting science by cooperating with research facilities and making research findings visible.

== History ==
The museum was founded in 1857 by a private association to secure the state's cultural heritage, prevent the export of significant materials, and, where possible, achieve the return of materials previously exported.

The museum building opened in 1860 but was soon too small for the rapidly-expanding collections. Despite financial contributions from local industry and from the town of Bregenz, it was not financially possible to commence the building of a new purpose-built museum until 1902. The new state-of-the-art museum opened in 1905. It was designed by Georg Baumeister, and incorporated heating, fire, and flood protection. Despite the provision for the growth of the collections, it was soon overflowing again. Despite complaints in the 1930s of a shortage of space, it was not until the 1950s that the next reconstruction took place; a new story was added and the decorative façade was removed. It was reopened in 1960, and represented the first investment in the building for half a century to address the increasing expectations of visitors.

Meanwhile, in 1947–48, the collections and the museum building were transferred to the state of Vorarlberg. Since 1997, it has had management support, together with the Bregenz art gallery and the Vorarlberg state theatre, from a management service company set up for that purpose.

In 2007, a decision was made to redesign the museum once again. The redesign was carried out by the Cukrowicz Nachbaur Architekten, who had won the previously announced competition. On 5 October 2009, it was closed for construction of a new building designed to double its previous floor area. The district administrative center was intended to be incorporated into the new building. The redesign was completed in 2013. The façade is adorned with 16,656 "blossoms". These are concrete casts of the bottom of commercially available PET bottles.

=== Main exhibitions ===
- "Vorarlberg. A Making Of" (on the history of Vorarlberg)
- "Buchstäblich Vorarlberg" ("Literally Vorarlberg", presentation of more than 160,000 artefacts from art, history and archaeology)
- "Weltstadt oder so? Brigantium im 1. Jh. n. Chr." ("Cosmopolitan city or something? Brigantium in the 1st century AD")

==== Former main exhibitions ====
- 2013–2018 “Römer oder so? Eine Ausstellung zum Gräberfeld in Brigantium” ("Romans or something? An exhibition on the burial ground in Brigantium")
- 2016–2021 “Ganznah. Landläufige Geschichten vom Berühren” ("Up close. Touching local stories", on surprising stories and facts about the region)

== Directors of Vorarlberg museum ==
- 1948–1986: Elmar Vonbank
- 1986–2006: Helmut Swozilek
- 2006–2011: Tobias G. Natter
- 2011–2024: Andreas Rudigier
- 2024–present: Michael Kasper

== Facilities ==
The museum operates a library with a stock of some 30,000 volumes on subjects connected to the museum's focus.

== Photo gallery ==
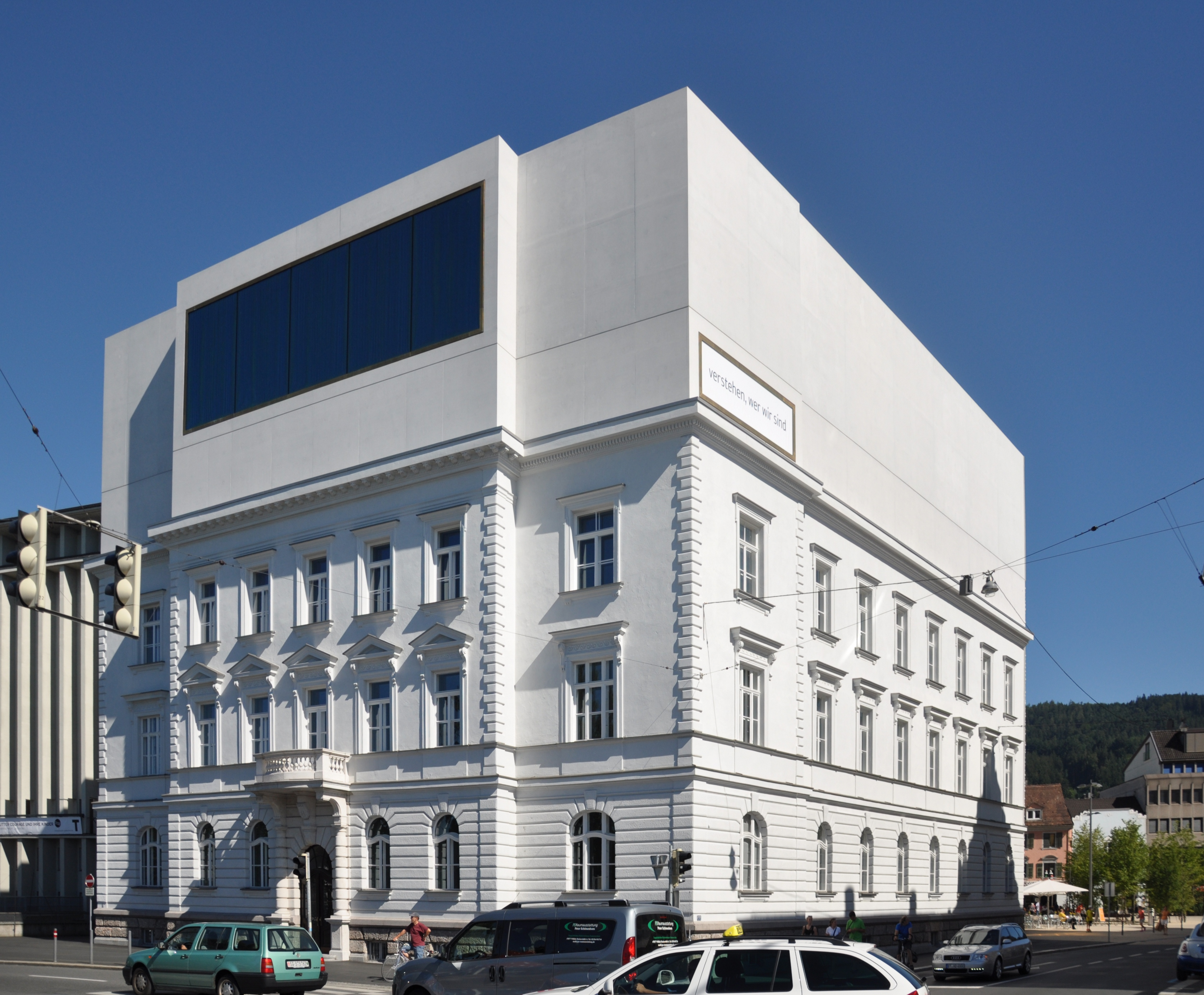
The vorarlberg museum from the outside (2013)

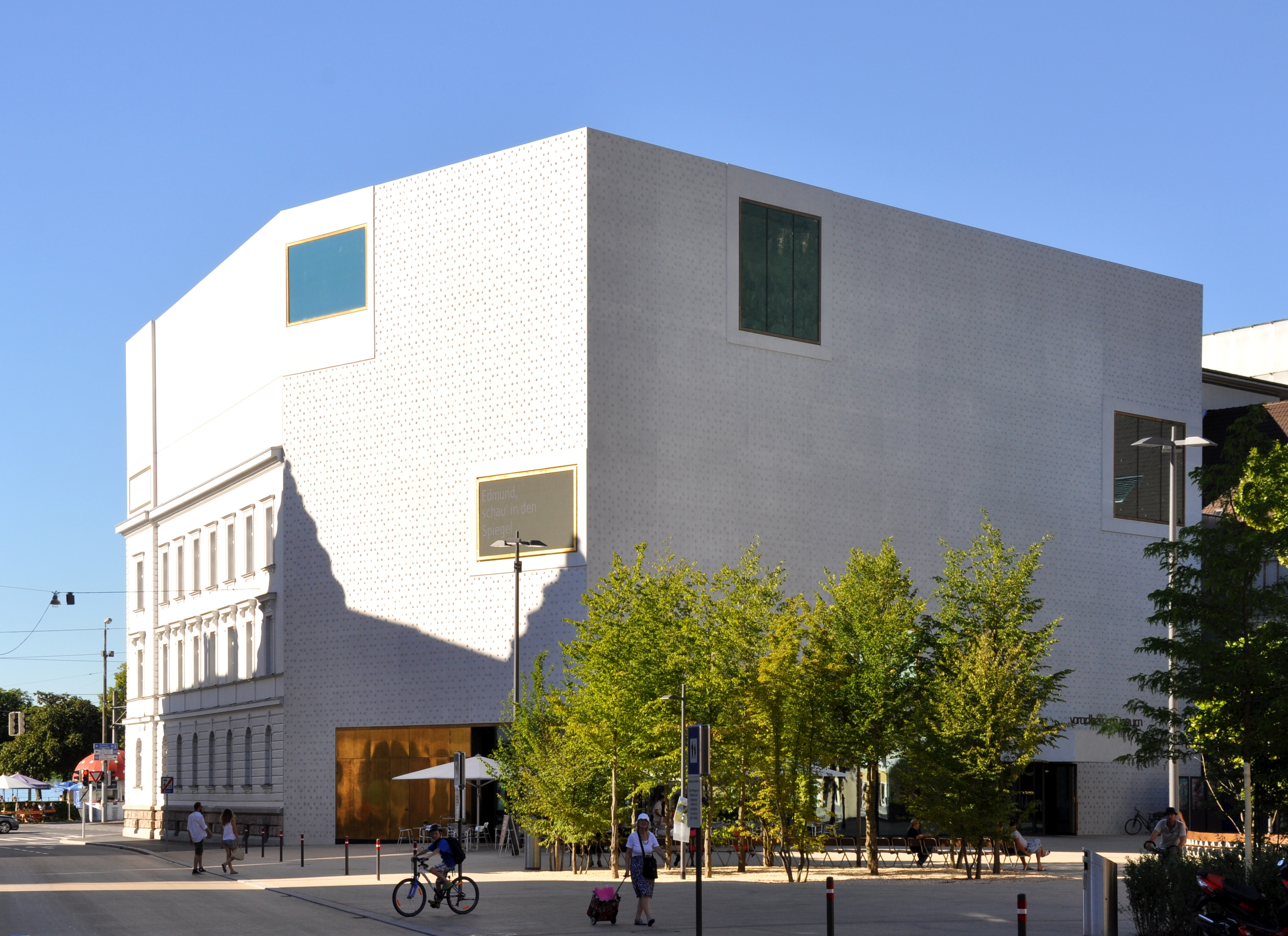
The vorarlberg museum from the outside (2013)

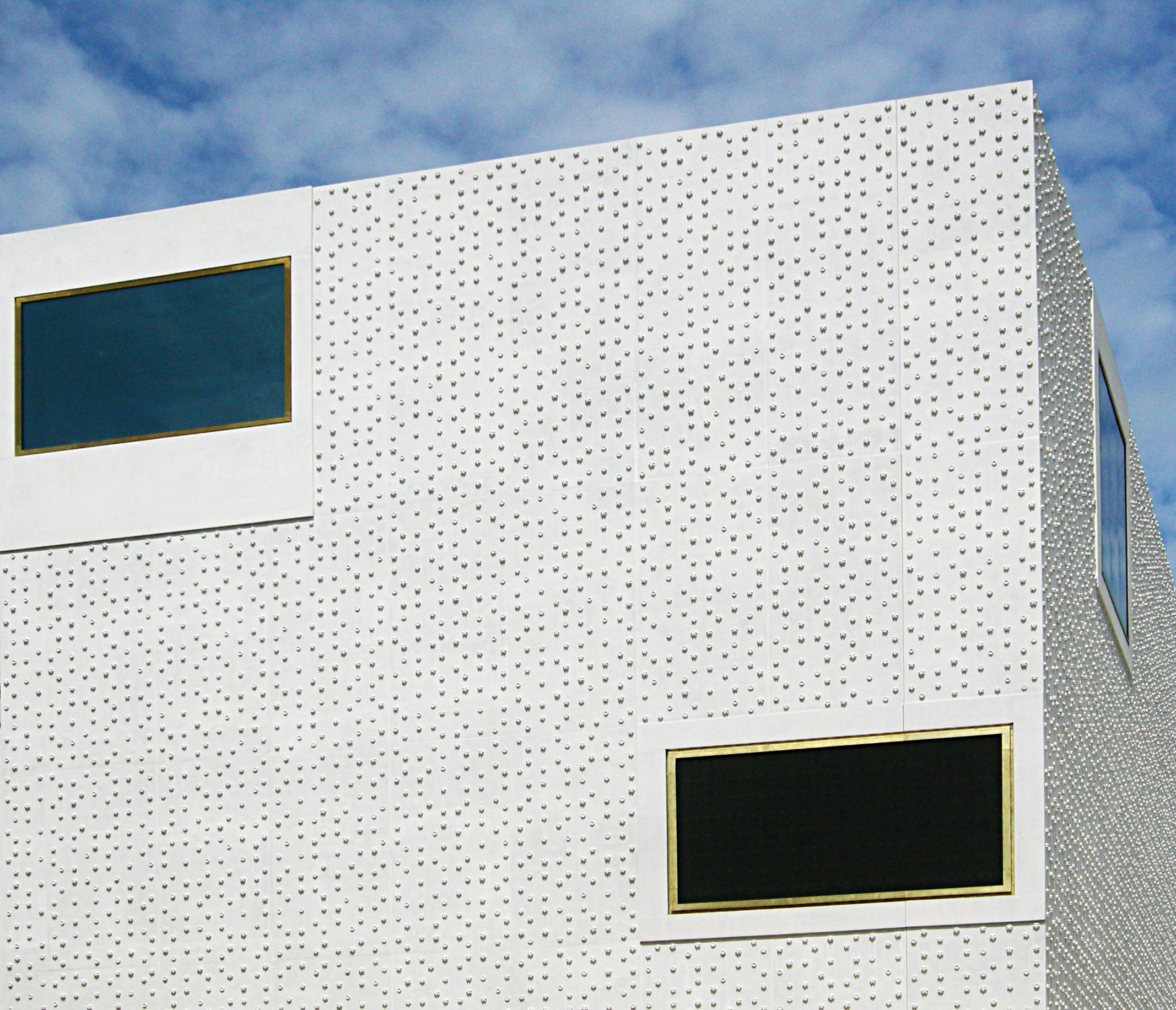
The vorarlberg museum from the outside

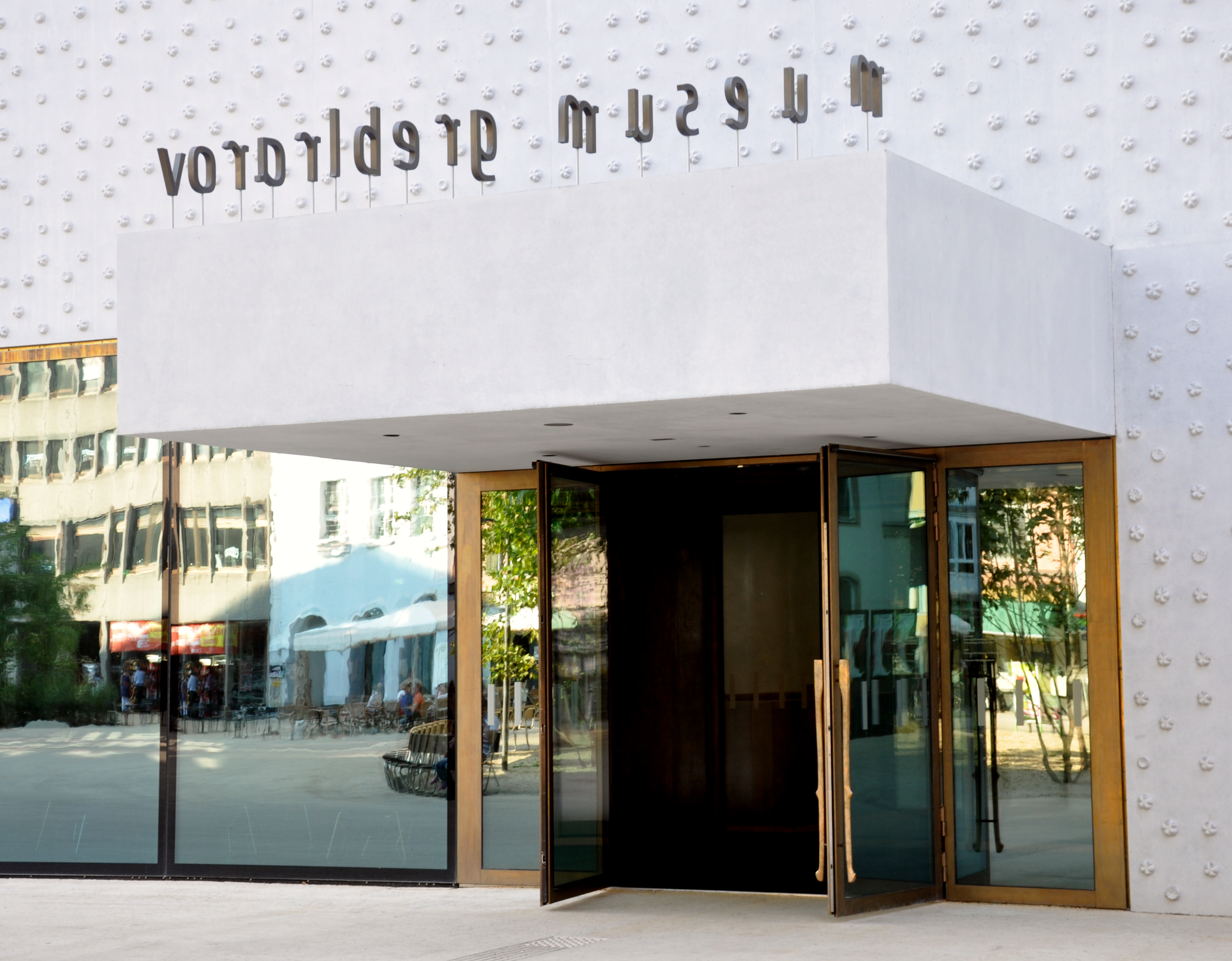
The entrance of the vorarlberg museum (2013)

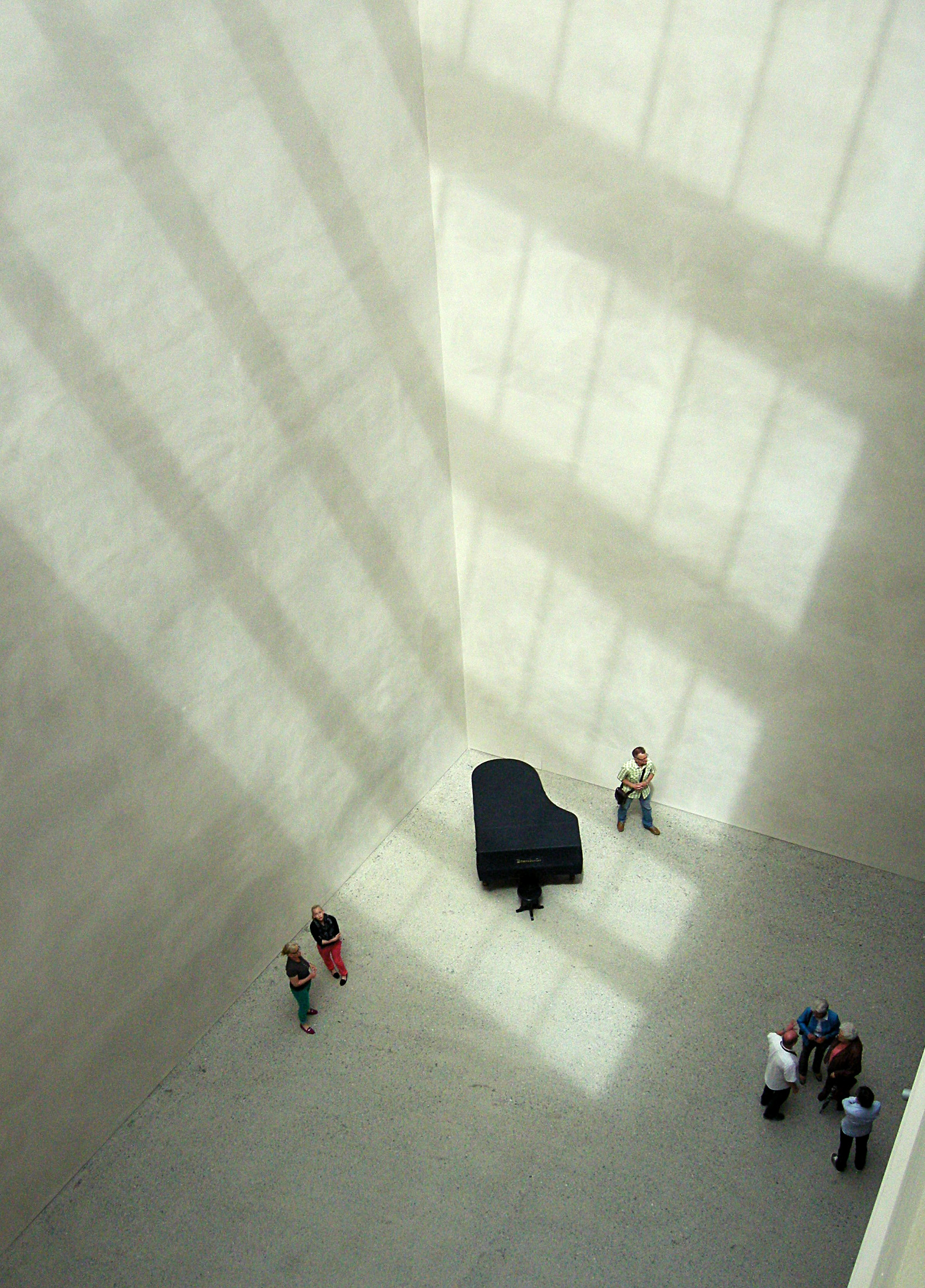
Inside the vorarlberg museum

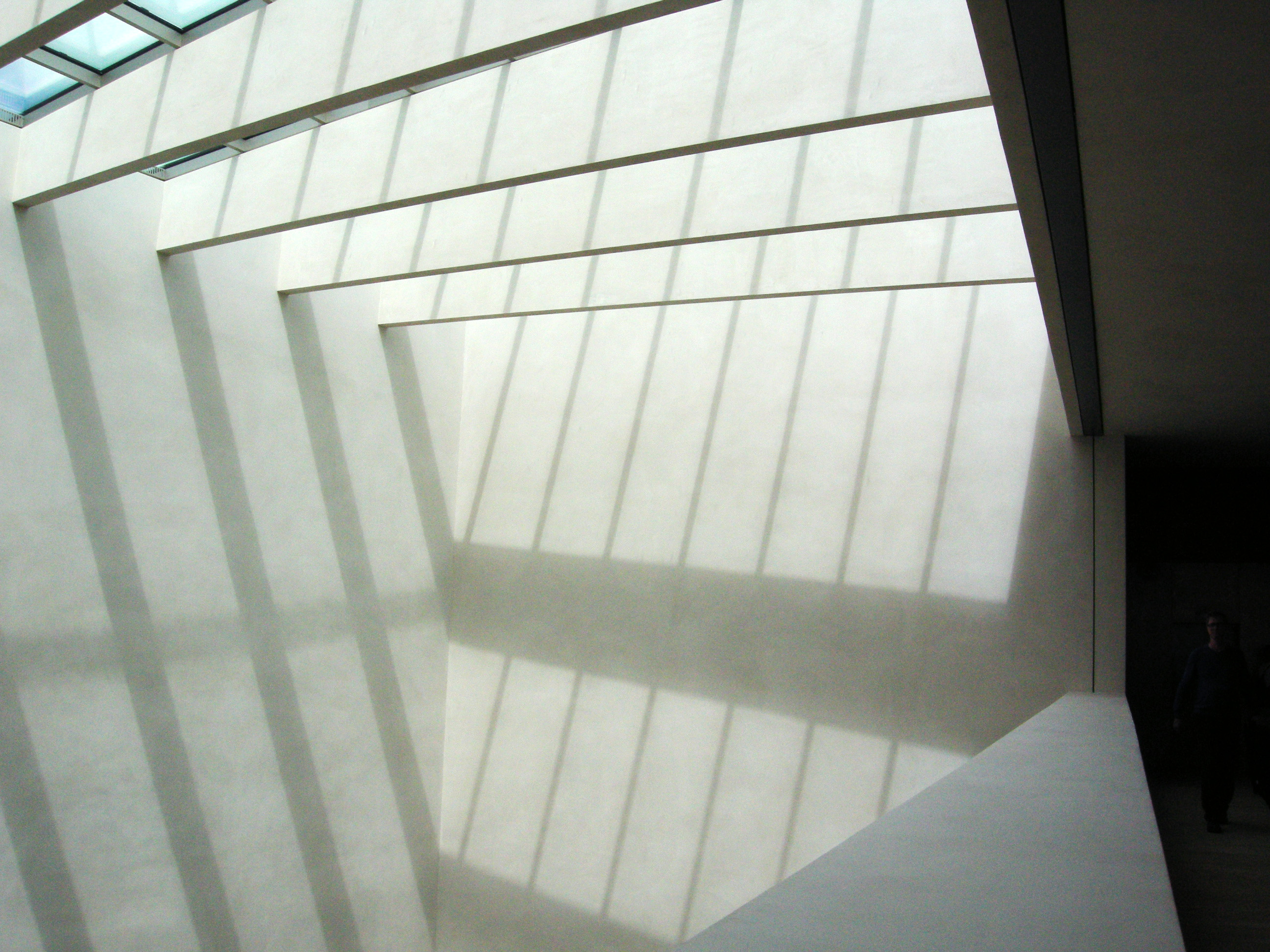
Inside the vorarlberg museum

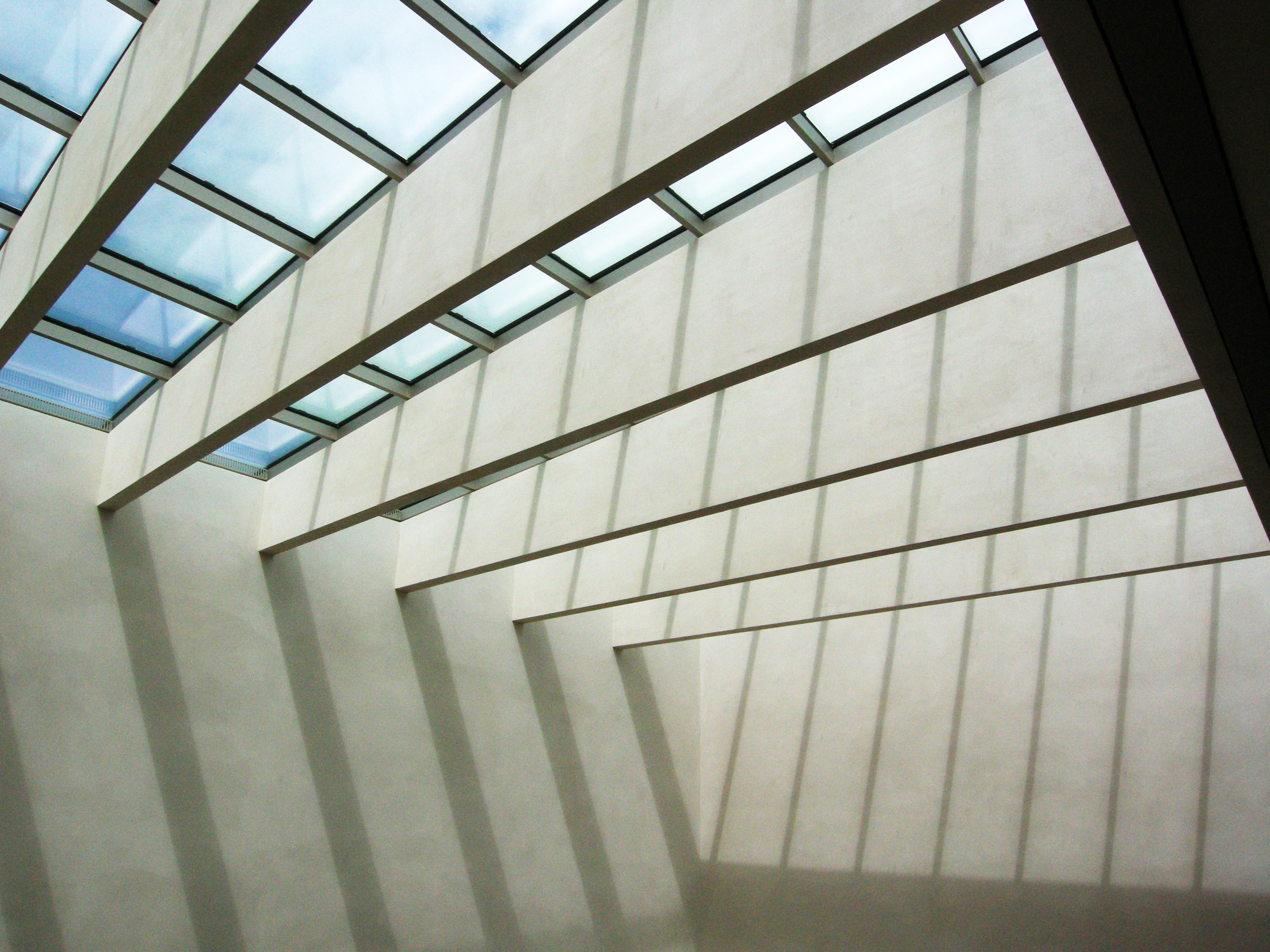
Inside the vorarlberg museum

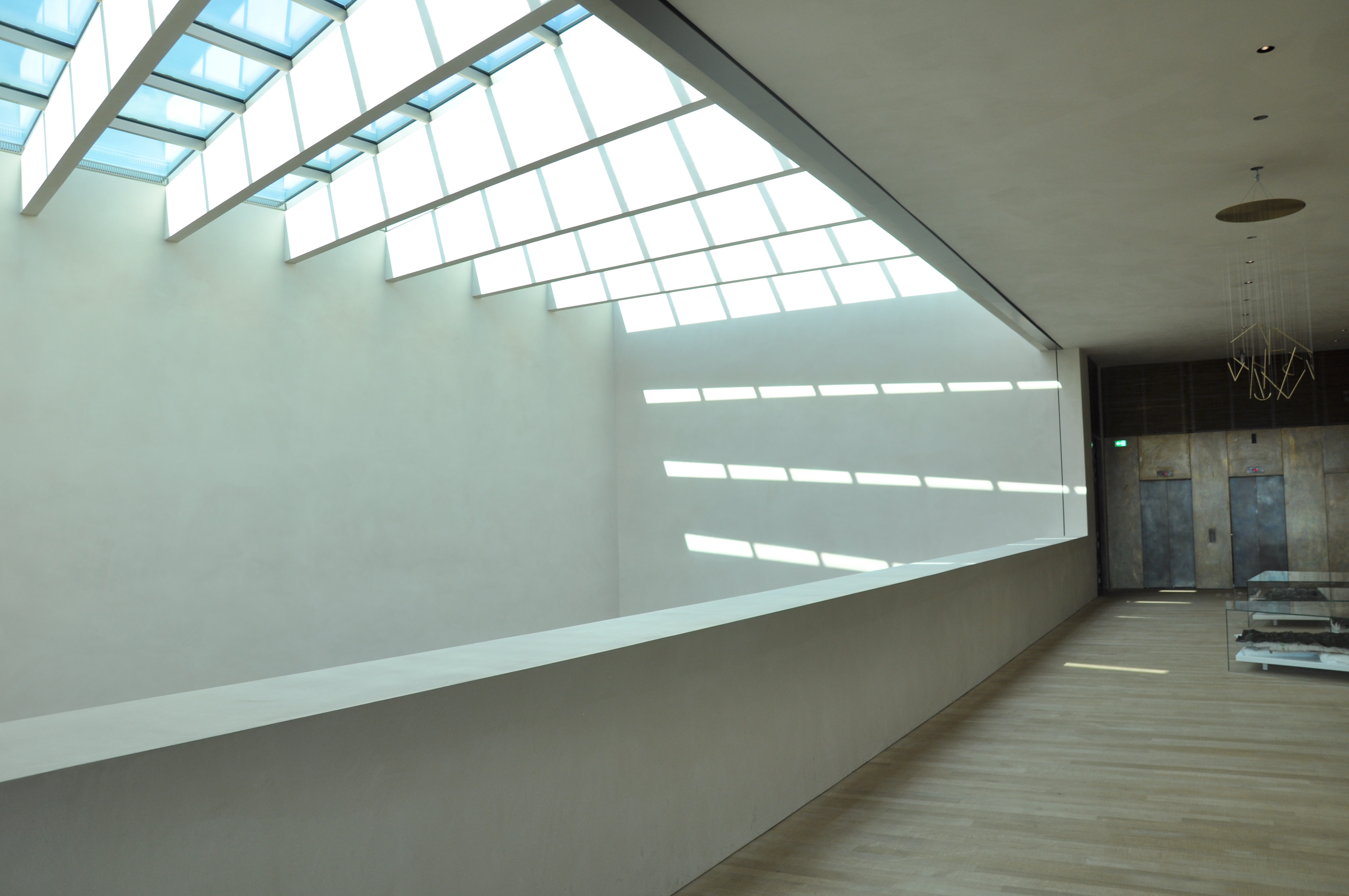
Inside the vorarlberg museum

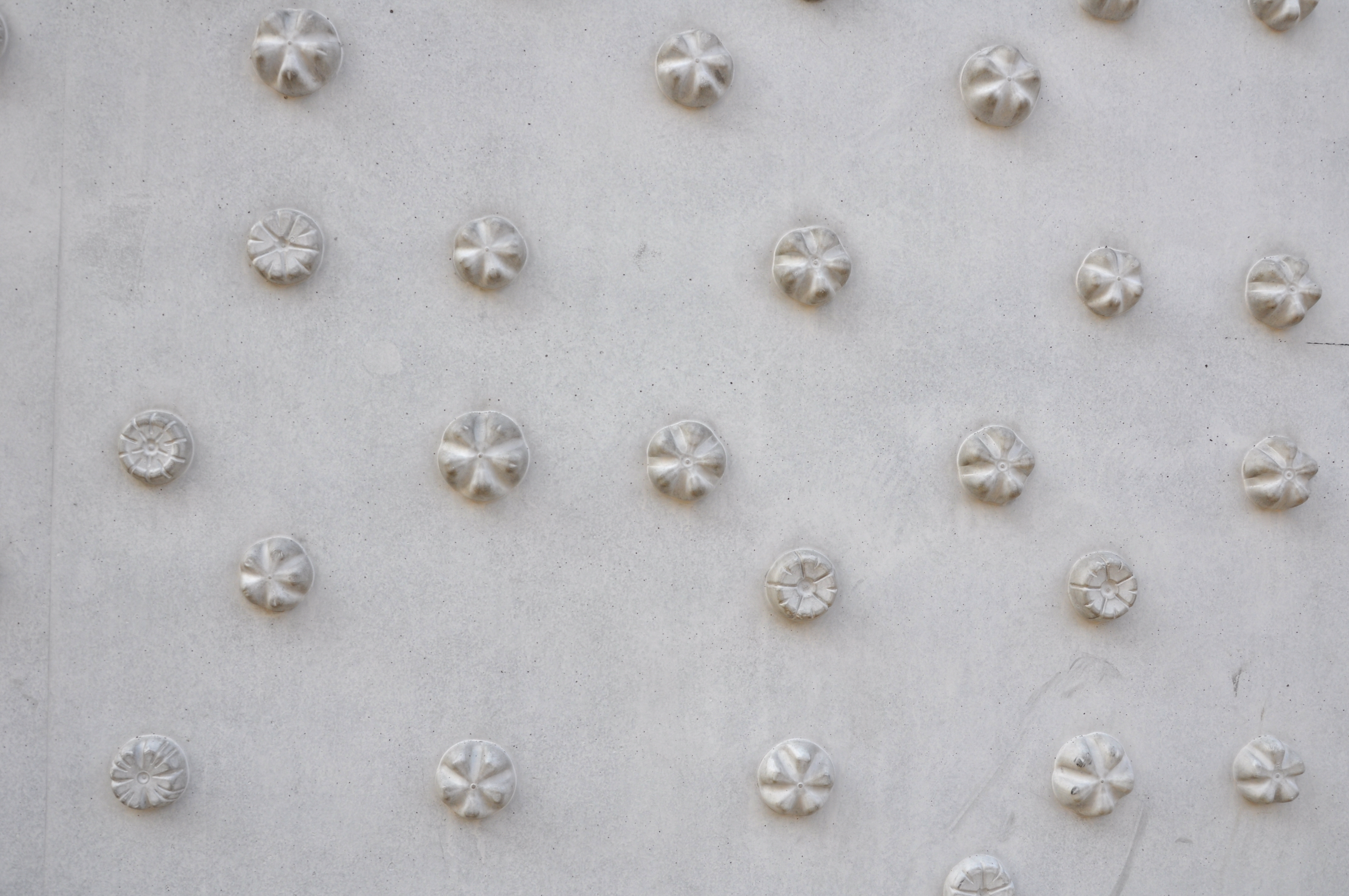
Close-up of the façade (made of 16,656 casts of plastic bottles)

== See also ==
- List of museums in Vorarlberg
