= Hugo Haberfeld =

Austrian art historian (1875–1946)

Hugo Haberfeld (November 24, 1875 – February 6, 1946), was an Austrian Jewish art dealer, who owned Galerie Miethke in early 20th century Vienna. When Austria joined Nazi Germany in the 1938 Anschluss, Haberfeld fled to Paris.

== Biography ==
Haberfeld was the son of the Jewish factory owner Julius Haberfeld and his wife Rosa.

After graduating from the Staatsobergymnasium in Bielitz, Haberfeld studied law and philosophy in Berlin and Vienna before earning his doctorate in 1900 in Breslau on Piero di Cosimo. He had studied art history, archaeology, history and philosophy there beforehand. His professors included Ernst Robert Curtius, Max Dessoir, Richard Förster, Richard Muther, Max Semrau and Georg Simmel.

Haberfeld married Paula Köberl on March 30, 1902 in Lipnik-Biala. In 1904, his daughter Marianne was born on April 16. Haberfeld earned his living by contributing as a freelance writer, for example, to the Viennese newspaper Die Zeit and the Berlin magazine Kunst und Künstler. Haberfeld became the business manager of the Miethke Gallery in Vienna in 1907. Haberfeld kept in touch with Wilhelm von Bode, the director of the Royal Museums in Berlin. In 1912 he became a sworn treasurer and expert for old and modern paintings at the Vienna commercial court.

He helped his son in law, René Sennhein, to form an art collection.

Director of the Miethke Gallery and a freelance writer, Haberfeld lived at Reisnerstraße 15 until February 4, 1938, according to the Vienna Meldearchiv. After Austria's Anschluss with Nazi Germany, he emigrated to Paris with his family in 1938.

== Galerie Miethke ==
Haberfeld joined the Miethke Gallery in 1907 as a replacement for Emil Maria Steininger. However competition between Hugo Haberfeld and Carl Moll led to the departure of Moll from gallery on July 31, 1912.

Under the mantle of the Miethke Gallery, Haberfeld also directed exhibitions of the municipal art gallery in Karlovy Vary in 1913.

Haberfeld expanded Galerie Miethke into exhibitions of private collections, exhibiting in 1912 art from the collections of art critics Ludwig Hevesi and Richard Muther and later works from the Dr. Oskar Reichel Collection. Haberfeld focused on the European avant-garde in the survey show Die Neue Kunst 1913, followed in 1914 by exhibitions of Picasso and André Derain.Haberfeld presented both Old Masters - e.g. Goya - and New Masters, and even photography.

In early 1917 Haberfeld purchased the Galerie Miethke. He shifted his focus away from exhibitions to the old master trade, occasionally auctioneering for the Glückselig auction house.

After the Anschluss with Nazi Germany, the Haberfelds were persecuted by the Nazis because of their Jewish heritage. They emigrated to Paris in 1938.

Galerie Miethke was deleted from the commercial register on October 1, 1940.

Clients of the Miethke Gallery included art collectors such as the Petscheks, the Breuers, the Hellmanns, the Oppenheimers and many other Jewish collectors who were later plundered by the Nazis.

== Hugo Haberfeld and Adolf Loos ==
Haberfeld entrusted Loos with the design of the apartment furnishings in Alser Strasse in Vienna's ninth district and Loos furnished Haberfeld's apartment with dining room, study and bedroom.

== Hugo Haberfeld and Christian Morgenstern ==
Morgenstern dedicated the poem ODI PROFANUM to Haberfeld in 1911. Haberfeld reviewed Morgenstern's poems IN PHANTAS SCHLOSS and HORATIUS TRAVESTITUS in the Wiener Rundschau.

== Writings ==
- Piero di Cosimo, Dr. R. Galle’s Buchdruckerei: Breslau, 1902. Dissertation
- Diavortrag über Gustav Klimt, in: Die Kunst für Alle. Monatsheft für freie und angewandte Kunst, Jg. 13, Heft 4, Januar 1912, pp. 173–183.
- Ferdinand Waldmüller. Galerie Miethke Ausstellung von Werken alter und moderner Kunst. November-Dezember 1904. Chwala: Wien, 1904.
- Beiträge in der Monatsschrift „Kunst und Künstler“:
  - 1902–1903
  - 1904
  - 1905
  - 1906
- „Religiöse Kunst in der Wiener Secession“, in: Kunst und Künstler, 1906, p. 164–170.
- Berliner Secession, in: „Die Zeit“ vom 15. September 1900 Bd. 23, Nr. 311
- Unsere Ausstellungen, in: „Die Zeit“ vom 1. Dezember 1900 Bd. 23, Nr. 322
- „Der Bildhauer Franz Metzner“, in: Kunstgewerbeblatt, 18. Jahrgang, Seemann: Leipzig, 1907, p. 89–102.
- "Modern Plastic Work in Austria", in: Holme, Charls (Hg.): “The Art-Revival in Austria”
- "The Architectural Revival in Austria", in: Holme, Charls (Hg.): “The Art-Revival in Austria”
- „Deutsch-Böhmische Kunst“, in: Deutsche Kunst und Dekoration, Vol. 19, Nov. 1906, p. 139–160.
- Der Bildhauer Anton Hanak. In: Neues Wiener Journal, Jg. 27, Nr. 9179, 23. Mai 1919, p. 5–6 (online).
- „Die Wiener Amateurphotographen“, in: Die photographische Kunst im Jahre 1906, p. 34–48.

== Literature ==
- Christian Morgenstern. Werke und Briefe. Urachhaus.
- Piero di Cosimo. Dr. R. Galles Buchdruckerei.
- Die Galerie Miethke. Eine Kunsthandlung im Zentrum der Moderne. Verlag des Jüdischen Museum Wien.
- Adolf Loos. Leben und Werk. Residenz.
