= Mankiewicz =

Mankiewicz (Polish pronunciation: [manˈkjɛvit͡ʂ]) is a patronymic surname of Polish and Ruthenian origins, and it is also common among Polish Jews.

Note: the letters "a" and "o" are interchangeable. Lithuanian Mankevičius and Monkevičius are the same.

Language	Masculine	Feminine
Polish	Mankiewicz	Mankiewicz (the most common form); Mankiewiczówna (unmarried); Mankiewiczowa (married); z Mankiewiczów ("née Mankiewicz")
Belarusian (Romanization)	Манкевіч (Mankievič, Mankievich, Mankievitch)	
Latvian	Mankevičs, Mankēvičs	Mankeviča, Mankēviča
Lithuanian	Mankevičius, Mankus	Mankevičienė (married); Mankevičiūtė (unmarried)
Russian (Romanization)	Манкевич (Mankevich, Mankevitch, Mankevič)	
Ukrainian (Romanization)	Манкевич (Mankevych, Mankevytch, Mankevyč)	
German	Mankiewitz	

== People with the name ==
- Francis Mankiewicz (1944–1993), Canadian film director, screenwriter and producer
- Frank Mankiewicz (1924–2014), American journalist and political adviser
- Henriette Mankiewicz (1852–1906), Austro-Hungarian embroiderer
- Mankiewicz family, an American family of film and media professionals
- Paul Mankiewitz (1857–1924), German bank manager

== Fictional Characters ==
- Melman Mankiewicz III, male giraffe from Madagascar franchise
