= Galerie Miethke =

Former art gallery in Vienna, Austria

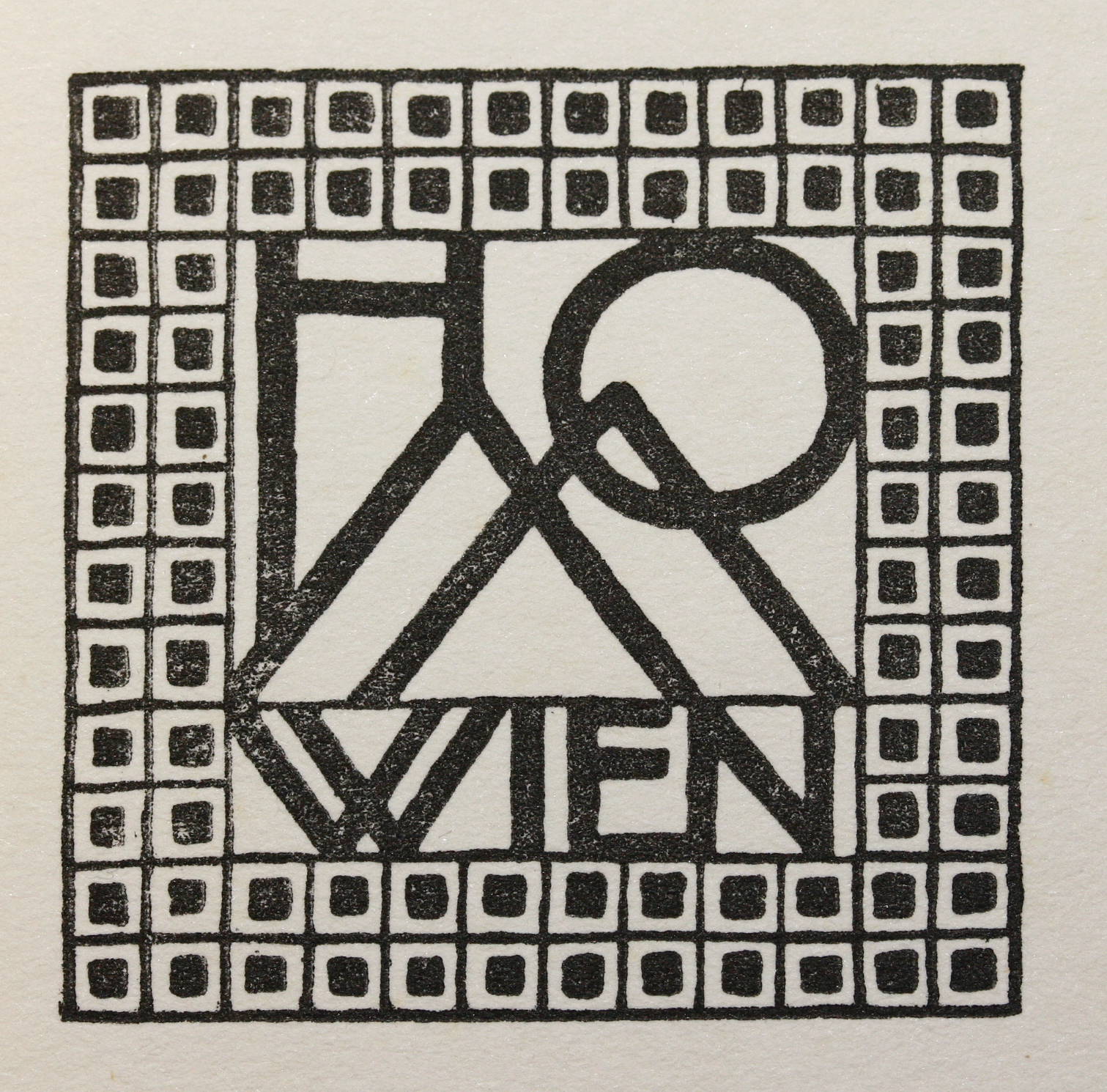
- Established: 1861; 165 years ago
- Location: Plankengasse 6 (1860s); Neur Markt 13 (1882); Dorotheergasse 11 (1895); Augustinerstrasse (1919); Vienna, Austria
- Type: Art gallery
- Owner: Hugo Othmar Miethke

Galerie Miethke (English: Miethke Gallery), also known as Galerie H. O. Miethke, was an Austrian art gallery established by Hugo Othmar Miethke in Vienna, Austria.

== History ==
=== Miethke's Beginnings ===
Originally known as Miethke & Wawra, the venture started as a collaboration between Miethke and Carl Josef Wawra, focusing on art publishing with an emphasis on editing photographs, reproductions, and printed works. Over time, they transitioned into hosting art auctions in Vienna, before eventually moving into art gallery management as the art market in Austria expanded. The art dealership, based in Vienna on Plankengasse 6, was granted by imperial decree in 1868 the exclusive rights to produce copies of the esteemed works from the Belvedere Gallery, planning to issue the best masterpieces in large volumes as photographic reproductions.

Carl Josef Wawra and Miethke went their separate ways around 1874. In Vienna, Miethke, as the sole proprietor of the gallery, established the 'Galerie H.O. Miethke'. The gallery moved from Plankengasse 6 to its second location at the corner of Neur Markt 13 in 1882. Miethke's aim was to enhance the Viennese public's appreciation of art, fostering both the pleasure of art enjoyment and the pride of art ownership.

The Viennese art dealer held an auction of the art collection of Daniel Penther, the Polish-Austrian painter and curator at Vienna's Academy of Fine Arts on 22 November 1887. An 1888 exhibition at the Parisian gallery featured the artistic estate of Hans Makart and published a catalogue of his art and antiques collection.

The gallery's owner, H.O. Miethke, purchased the Palace of Nákó (now Palais Eskeles) at Dorotheergasse 11. In 1895, he commissioned the Viennese architecture firm Kupka & Orglmeister to complete a redesign of the palace to house Galerie Miethke.

Galerie Miethke was featured in the 'Swiss Review' (German: Schweizerische Rundschau), a Swiss magazine, when the new venue was opened to the general public in 1896. It contained masterpieces by Meissonier, Troyon, Roybet, Corot, Leempoels, Pradilla, Rumpler, Molitor, Giacomo Favretto, Achenbach, Stuck, Gabriël, Max, Grützner, Burne-Jones, and more. Franz von Lenbach also had his own home in the upper rooms, which were decorated with Venetian ceilings, wallpaper, and draperies. There was a Hans Makart room with a Makart bust created by Tilgner. Another room held a genuine painting by Peter Paul Rubens that was rediscovered, bearing the name "Mars and Venus." The gallery presented the large artwork which was part of a batch of valuable pieces by old Dutch masters that Miethke had obtained from a Scottish private collection a few years earlier. The painting was done in Rubens' series for Marie de' Medici. A stormy landscape by Jan van Goyen, a male portrait by Sir Joshua Reynolds, a dune landscape by Salomon van Ruysdael, and an artwork by Gerard ter Borch were all shown at the Miethke Gallery.

By 1896, the Viennese gallery was well-regarded among Austrian art salons, with its space in the courtyard of the former Palais Náko on Dorotheergasse. On 17 October 1896, the Miethke Gallery hosted an exhibition of a collection of about 300 pieces by Viennese landscape artist Robert Russ, which included finished paintings, studies, pencil sketches, watercolors, and gouache works. Some pieces were contemporary creations, while others were rumored to date back to his days studying under the German artist Albert Zimmermann. The gallery hosted its exhibition of Viktor Tilgner's estate from November 28 until the auction on 1 December 1896. During that year, H.O. Miethke also enriched the gallery's holdings by acquiring Arnold Böcklin's "God the Father and Adam in Paradise" for 40,000 marks.

Miethke began an exhibition of the work of the Austrian painter Franz Rumpler in April 1897. The gallery displayed over 200 works by Rumpler, the Viennese Academy professor, encompassing oil paintings, watercolors, and drawings. The Austrian emperor Franz Joseph I notably visited the Rumpler Exhibition at the gallery on 14 May 1897 to view the paintings. He took interest in Rumpler's individual works, especially the landscape painting "Area near Mies in Bohemia", the "Peasant Types from Bohemia", the portrait of the artist's mother, and the "Parade in Tachau".

Galerie Miethke in December 1897 curated an exhibition that included all the artworks that German painter Franz von Stuck had produced in recent times. The Franz Stuck exhibition included the following paintings: "The Fall of Man", "Paradise Lost", "Procession of Bacchantes", "The Bad Conscience", "Sin", and a portrait of Luitpold, Prince Regent of Bavaria. The works were displayed at the gallery before being auctioned as private property.

=== Moll's Creative Direction ===
In 1904, H.O. Miethke retired from the business, and the gallery changed ownership twice, from Hans Weidenbusch to Paul Bacher. The new owner, Bacher, was a close friend of Austrian painter Gustav Klimt. That year, Carl Moll, an Austrian painter of the Vienna Secession, was installed as artistic consultant and organized significant exhibitions.

Between November and December 1905, the gallery at Dorotheergasse 11 hosted an exhibition showcasing art by modern Munich painters. The first floor of Galerie Miethke was filled with the works of artists like Franz Stuck, Fritz von Uhde, Adolf Hengeler, Julius and Wilhelm Diez, Hans Harburger, Fritz Hegenbart, Walter Geffcken, Josef Willroider, Nikolaos Gyzis, Count Freiburg, Hans Reinhold Lichtenberger, Gino Parin, Carl Friedrich, Benno Becker, among others.

The gallery launched a new business venue at the Graben in Vienna's Innere Stadt on 3 December 1905 through an exhibition titled "Die Jungen". It was the first time the Wiener Werkstätte presented to a local audience, featuring major works by Josef Hoffmann, Koloman Moser, and Carl Otto Czeschka. Rudolf Kalvach also participated in the group exhibition held at Galerie Miethke.

In January 1906, the gallery under Moll's creative direction, held an exhibition of 45 works by Vincent van Gogh at Galerie Miethke's Dorotheergasse venue. The works of Eugene Spiro and Alfred Kubin were also showcased together in February 1906 at Dorotheergasse.

From March to April 1906, an exhibition of the works of Austrian painter Carl Schuch was hosted at Graben 17. Russian painter Nicholas Roerich was showcased at the location from May to June 1906.

=== The Haberfeld Era ===
After Bacher's death, his wife, Emma-Bacher-Paulick took over ownership of the gallery. Dr. Hugo Haberfeld, an art historian, journalist, and writer from Vienna, started co-managing Galerie Miethke with Carl Moll in 1907. Haberfeld's journalism career included detailed coverage of the exhibitions of the Vienna Secession and events at Galerie Miethke. Haberfeld facilitated the sale of art and obtained loans for the gallery, enabling exhibitions to be held in Austria and on the international stage.

Galerie Miethke hosted the estate auction of Austrian painter Wilhelm Bernatzik on 17 February 1907 at Dorotheergasse 11 and Graben 17. During March and April 1907, an exhibition featured works by the French artist Paul Gauguin. Carl Moll at Galerie Miethke produced "Das Werk von Gustav Klimt" in installments between 1908 and 1914, a folio featuring collotypes of Gustav Klimt's works. The gallery hosted an exhibition of Spanish painter Francisco Goya's art from March to April 1908, organized by Moll. From November to December 1908, French artist Honoré Daumier's work was exhibited at the Galerie Miethke. An exhibition of works by French painter Henri de Toulouse-Lautrec from the collection of Alfred Walter Heymel was notably arranged in autumn of 1909. Haberfeld and Moll worked together to showcase Édouard Manet and Claude Monet in 1910. Moll arranged an exhibition at the gallery of Austrian painter Egon Schiele in 1911. That year, Austrian artist Koloman Moser exhibited 53 works in a solo exhibition.

The collaboration of Moll and Haberfeld ended by 1912 due to professional discord, leading to Moll's exit.

Under Haberfeld's direction, Galerie Miethke hosted an exhibition titled 'The New Art' (German: Die Neue Kunst) from January through February 1913. The exhibition catalogue was created by the Paris-based art critic Adolphe Basler. From January to February 1912, Miethke Gallery held exhibitions of French Masters, including Renoir, Pissarro, Manet, Sisley, Courbet, Cezanne, and D'Espagnat. From April to May 1912, the works of painters and sculptors from the Berlin Secession were exhibited at Galerie Miethke. In February of the following year, the gallery hosted an exhibition of the private collection belonging to Oskar Reichel.

In 1914, the gallery published various exhibition catalogues, including Pablo Picasso who exhibited from February to March, and André Derain from March to April, which was followed by Lea von Littrow.

Miethke Gallery closed in 1915, with Haberfeld buying it from Emma-Bacher-Paulick in 1917 to become the sole proprietor. Haberfeld directed the gallery until he relocated to Paris, France with his family in 1938. As of 1 October 1940, Galerie Miethke was no longer listed in the commercial register.

== See also ==
- Hugo Othmar Miethke
