= Kupka & Orglmeister =

Austrian architecture and construction firm

Practice information
- Firm type: Architecture
- Founders: Franz Kupka; Gustav Orglmeister
- Founded: 1889 in Vienna, Austria
- Dissolved: 1911

Significant works and honors
- Buildings: Kaasgrabenkirche

Kupka & Orglmeister was an Austrian architecture and construction firm founded in 1889 by Vienna-based architects and master builders Franz Kupka and Gustav Orglmeister.

== History ==
Kupka & Orglmeister was founded in Vienna, Austria in the late 19th century by Franz Kupka and Gustav Orglmeister. Orglmeister was an Austrian architect from Prague, and Kupka was a master builder from Głubczyce. The duo, Kupka and Orglmeister, launched their architecture and construction firm in Vienna in 1889, and in 1890, they were granted their city architect's license.

In December 1892, construction consent was granted to the city architects and firm to build a residential building on Jaquingasse 39 in Vienna.

In 1894, the two became involved with Stefan Esders, a Belgian-born merchant who came to Vienna and enjoyed a world-wide reputation as the founder and co-owner of men's clothing establishments in Brussels, Rotterdam, Paris, London, and other cities. Esders commissioned a new warehouse and one of the largest Viennese department stores at the corner of Mariahilfer Straße 18 and Breitegasse called "The Big Factory" (Zur großen Fabrik). It was built by Kupka & Orglmeister according to the designs of the Viennese architect Friedrich Schachner. Within the spacious building, the basement up to the first floor operated as the warehouse and factory, and the second and third floors were designated for apartments. The construction was notably completed in just seven months. The official opening of the building occurred on the 3rd of April in 1895.

The task of redesigning the Palace of Nákó (now known as Palais Eskeles) for the Galerie Miethke in 1895 was given to the Viennese architecture firm by Hugo Othmar Miethke. They also completed a building with nine storeys, following a blueprint provided by the renowned Austrian architects Fellner & Helmer. From 1895 to 1896, the Van-Swieten-Hof at Rotenturmstraße 19 was constructed by Kupka & Orglmeister, using the designs of Julius Deininger.

That year in 1896, the Vienna-based company Valerian Gillar, executed a wrought iron gate with a grille based on drawings by Kupka & Orglmeister for a building on Kohlmarkt.

Around 1897, Kupka & Orglmeister designed the plan for Josef Krantz's Hotel Krantz-Ambassador. The building at Neuer Markt 6, which replaced "Zur alten Mehlgrube," was completed in 1898, standing on a site once designed by the renowned Fischer von Erlach. The entire 793-square-meter plot was developed at ground level, with the exception of a 12-meter-wide atrium.

In 1898, the Esders Pavilion was built according to the detailed drawings of the architects Kupka and Orglmeister. An annex of the pavilion was designed to replicate a small, modern salon, with five wax figures elegantly dressed in salon outfits, travel costumes, and liveries, as it was known in the past. The firm later designed Esder's family residence, the Villa Stefan Esders, built in Vienna in 1900.

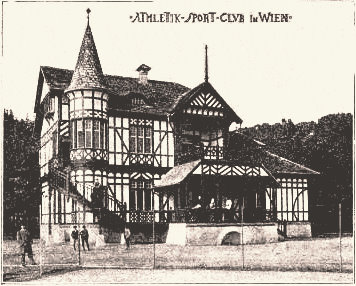
WAC-Clubhaus, Kupka & Orglmeister, 1900

The Club House of Wiener Athletiksport Club, a villa-like building, was designed by the Kupka & Orglmeister firm between 1898 and 1899.

In August 1899, a group including Kupka & Orglmeister was granted permission for technical preparatory work on a narrow-gauge railway, starting from Hüttedorf-Hacking station of the Imperial Royal Austrian State Railways and leading to a planned villa complex near Wolfsberg in Carinthia.

Orglmeister, who was a part of the Vienna Secession movement established in 1897, contributed significantly to its architectural expressions. Between 1899 and 1900, the architecture and construction firm was tasked with constructing a building with influences from the Vienna Secession on Landstraßer Hauptstraße 15 in Vienna. From 1901 to 1903, Kupka & Orglmeister constructed a Secessionist house on Königsklostergasse 6. They built another house in the Secession style on Mariahilfer Straße 27 in 1908. A five-storey apartment building was constructed by the firm in 1905, showcasing a fusion of Neo-Classical and Mannerist styles, distinguished by a staircase featuring ceiling paintings by Alexander Demetrius Goltz. In 1908, Kupka & Orglmeister created the design for Vienna's Carlton Hotel, a large-scale project with 311 rooms and 436 beds, which was built at a cost of 14 million francs.

In 1908, the firm of Kupka & Orglmeister was commissioned to build a pilgrimage church. Between 1909 and 1910, the Kaasgrabenkirche in Grinzing, was built by the Vienna-based architects. Orglmeister completing the planning and Kupka carrying out the design and execution. Stefan Esders played a crucial role in financially supporting the church's construction.
