= Hans Makart =

Austrian academic history painter, designer, and decorator (1840–1884)

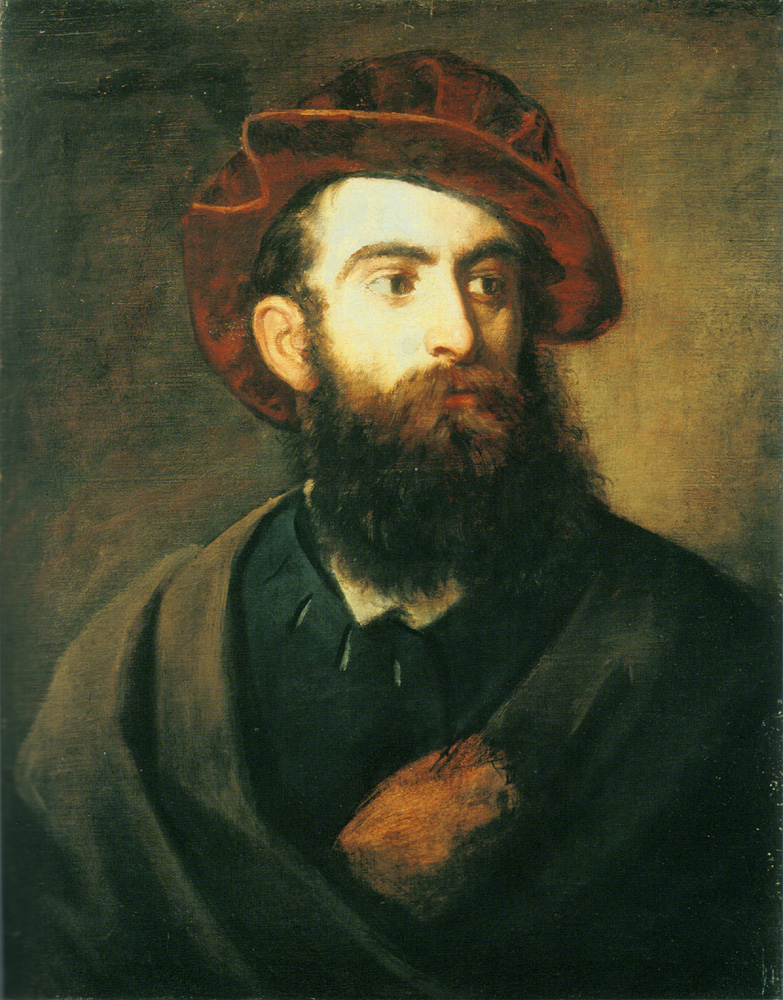
- Hans Makart, Self-portrait, 1878
- Born: 28 May 1840; Salzburg, Austria
- Died: 3 October 1884 (aged 44); Vienna, Austria
- Education: Vienna Academy (1850-1851); Karl Theodor von Piloty, Munich
- Known for: Painter, draughtsman, designer and decorator
- Movement: Academic history painting; Orientalist

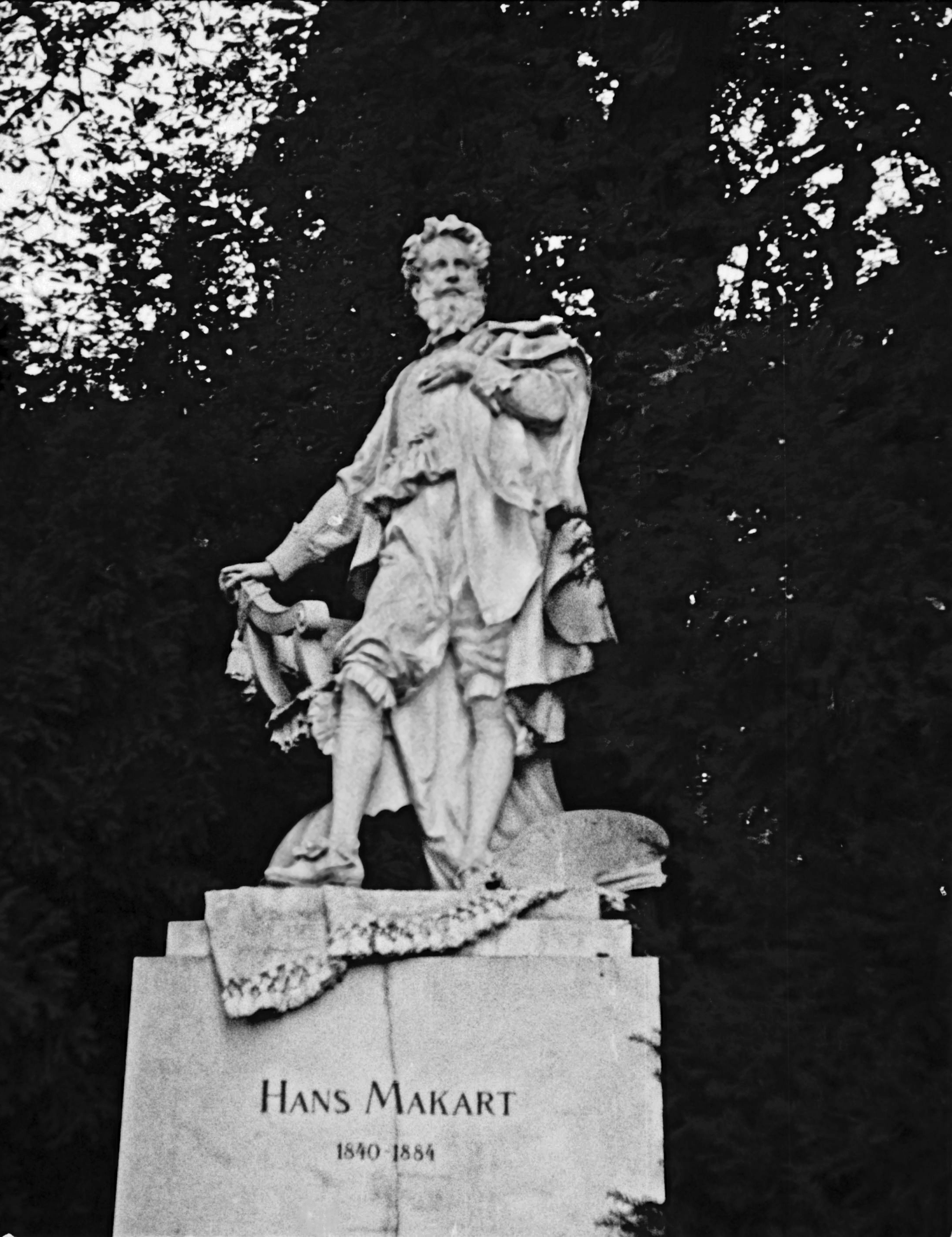
Statue of Hans Makart in Vienna City Park ("Stadtpark")

Hans Makart (28 May 1840 – 3 October 1884) was an Austrian academic history painter, designer and decorator. Makart was a prolific painter whose ideas significantly influenced the development of visual art in Austria-Hungary, Germany, and other countries.

== Life ==
Modern Amoretti, right panel of three main panels, Hans Makart Leopold Museum

Makart was the son of a chamberlain at the Mirabell Palace, born in the former residence of the prince-archbishops of Salzburg, the city in which Mozart had been born. He was initially trained in painting by Johann Fischbach at the Vienna Academy between 1850 and 1851. During Makart's training at the Academy, German art was governed by classicism, which was entirely intellectual and academic: clear and precise drawing, sculpturesque modelling, and pictorial erudition were esteemed above all. Makart, who was a poor draughtsman but had a passionate and sensual love of colour, was impatient to escape from the routine of art school drawing. Fortunately for him, he was adjudged by his instructors to be devoid of all talent and was forced to leave the Vienna Academy.

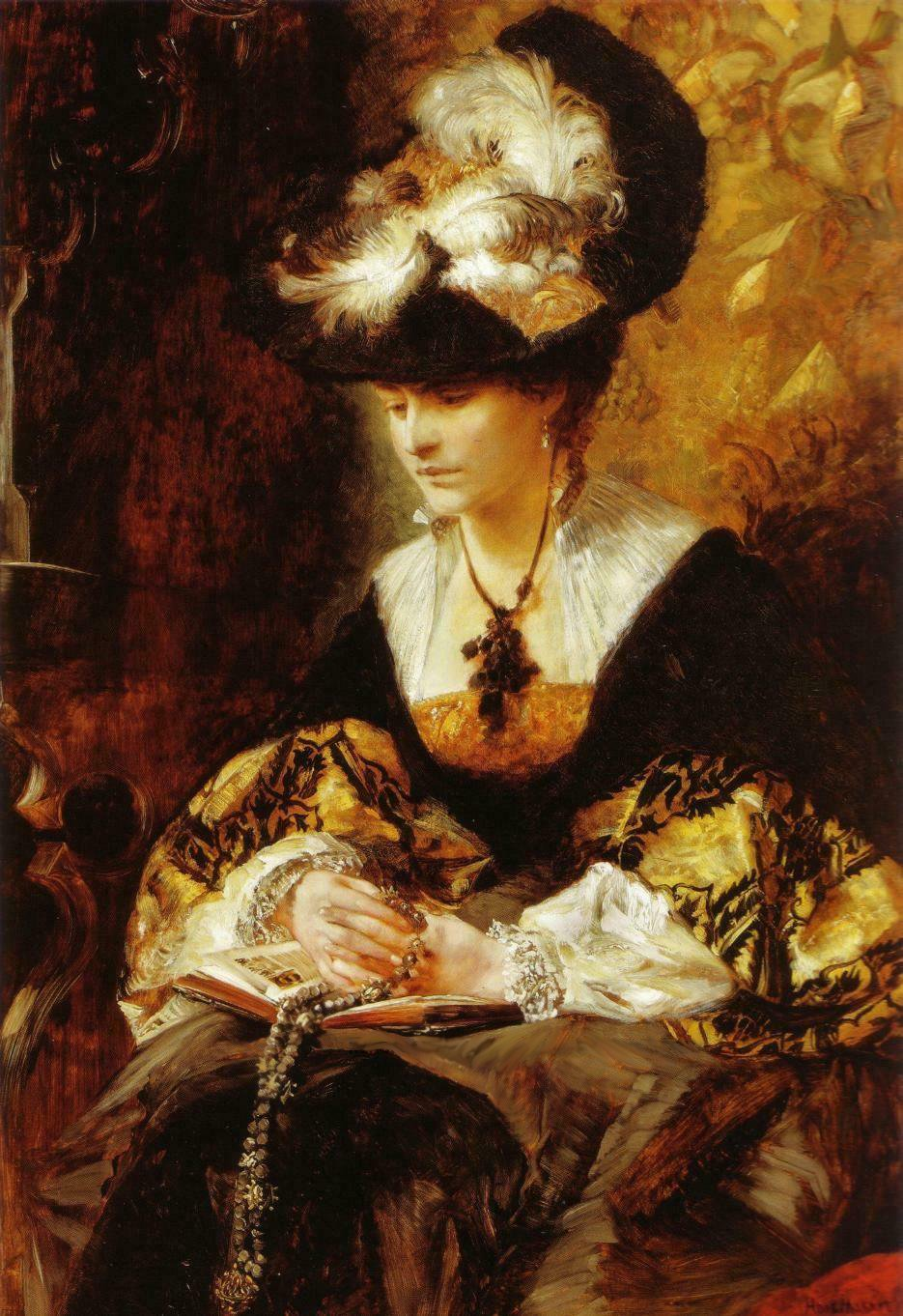
Portrait of Countess Palffy (Die Betende), 1880

He went to Munich, and after two years of independent study attracted the attention of Karl Theodor von Piloty, under whose guidance he developed his painting style between 1861 and 1865. During this period, Makart also travelled to London, Paris and Rome to pursue his studies. The first picture he painted under Piloty, Lavoisier in Prison, although generally considered timid and conventional, nevertheless attracted attention by its sense of colour. In his subsequent work, The Knight and the Water Nymphs, he first displayed the decorative qualities to which he afterwards sacrificed everything else in his work. His fame became established during the following year with two works: Modern Amoretti and The Plague in Florence. Shortly after this, his painting Romeo and Juliet was purchased for the Vienna Museum by the Austrian Emperor, and Makart was invited by the aristocracy to go to Vienna.

Prince Von Hohenlohe provided Makart with an old foundry at the Gusshausstraße 25 to use as a studio. He gradually turned it into an impressive place full of sculptures, flowers, musical instruments, requisites and jewellery that he used to create classical settings for his portraits, which were mainly of women. Eventually his studio looked like a salon and became a social meeting point in Vienna. Cosima Wagner described it as "a miracle of decorative beauty, a sublime lumber-room". His luxurious studio served as a model for a great many upper-middle-class living rooms.

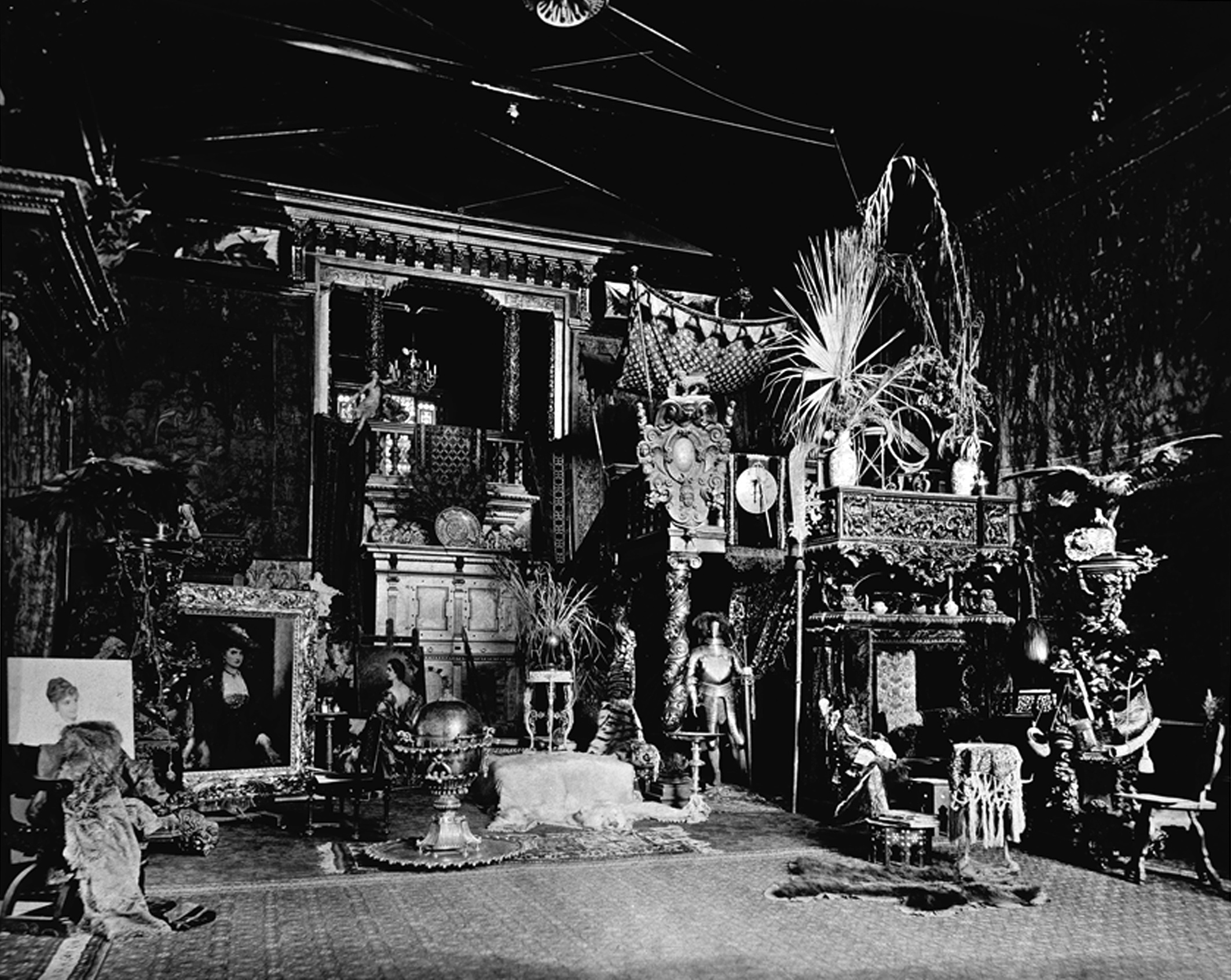
Makart's atelier, 1875

The opulent, semi-public spaces of Makart's atelier were the scene of recurring rendezvous between the artist and his public. Makart became the mediator between different levels of society: he created a socially ambiguous atmosphere in which nobility and bourgeoisie could encounter one another in mutual veneration of the master, and aestheticised the burgeoning self-awareness of the bourgeoisie by means of historical models drawn from the world of the aristocracy. In this way, an artist like Makart acted out the image that high society had created of him.

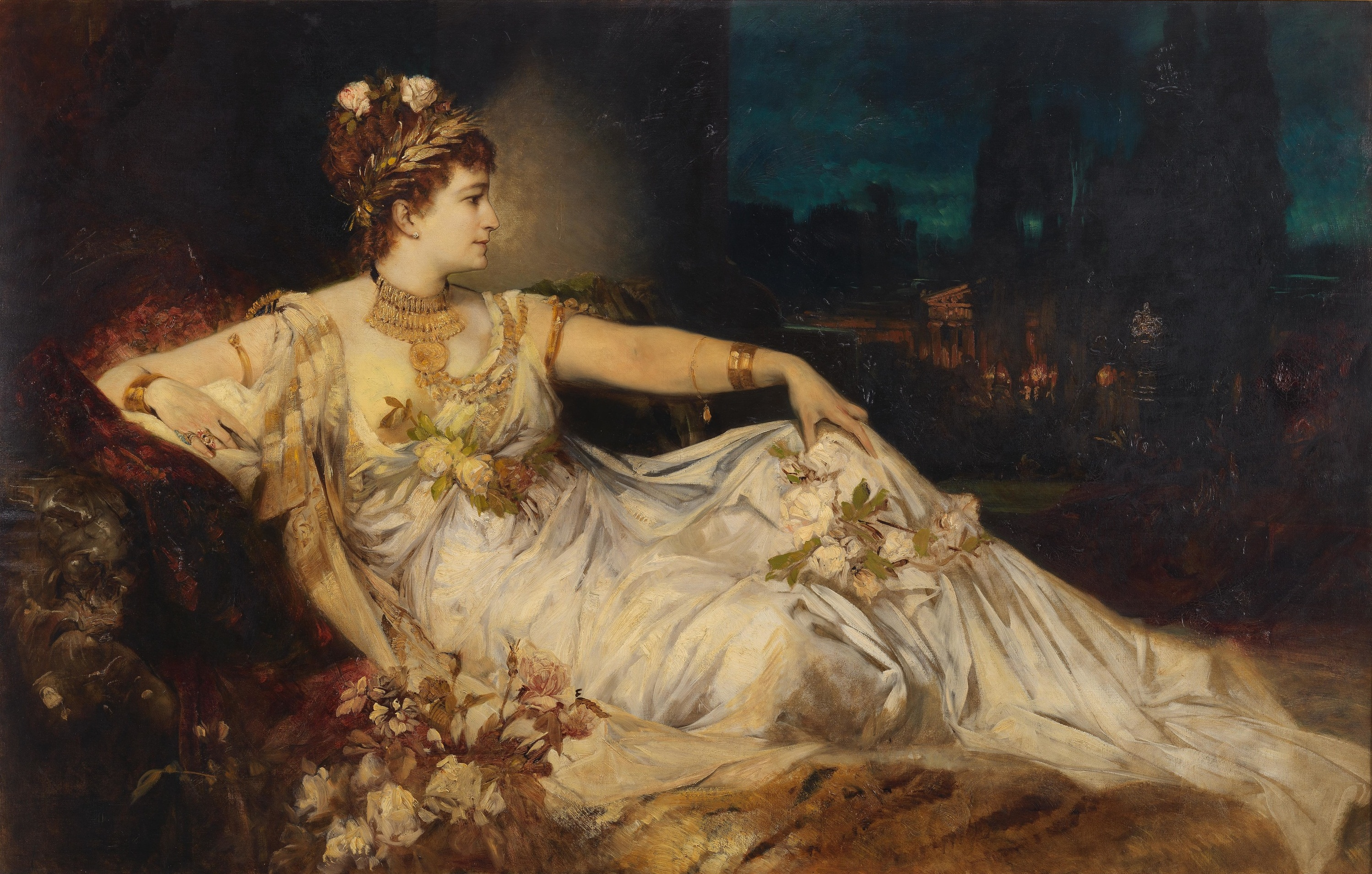
Charlotte Wolter as "Messalina", c. 1875

Makart became the acknowledged leader of Vienna's artistic scene, which in the 1870s passed through a period of feverish activity. One chief result of this activity is the sumptuously-decorated public buildings on the Ringstraße. He not only practised painting, but was also an interior designer, costume designer, furniture designer and decorator, and his work embellished most of the public spaces of the era. His work engendered the term "Makartstil", or "Makart style", which completely characterised the era.

In 1879, Makart designed a pageant organised to celebrate the Imperial couple's silver wedding anniversary (Emperor Franz Joseph I and his wife Elisabeth of Bavaria; he designed, single-handedly, the costumes, scenic setting and triumphal cars. This became known as the "Makart-parade", and gave the people of Vienna the opportunity to dress up in historical costumes and be transported back into the past for a few hours. At the head of the parade was a float for artists, led by Makart on a white horse. His festivals became an institution in Vienna which lasted up until the 1960s. In the same year of the first parade, Makart became a Professor at the Vienna Academy.

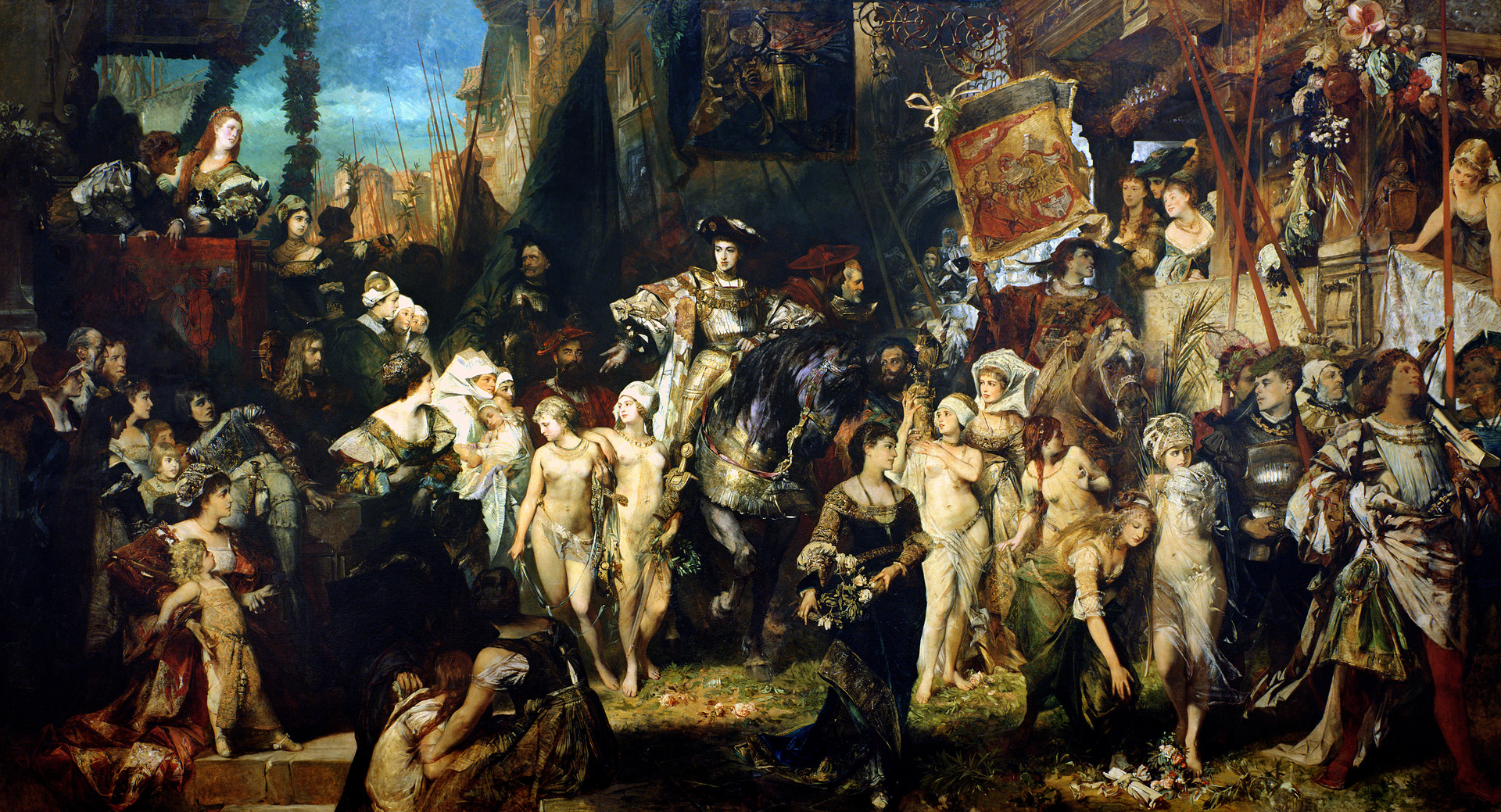
The Entry of Charles V into Antwerp

Makart's painting The Entry of Charles V into Antwerp caused some controversy, because Charles V was depicted arriving in a procession surrounded by nude virgins (it was considered offensive to include nudes in such a relatively modern scene). In the United States, the painting came under the proscription of Anthony Comstock, which secured Makart's fame there. The American public immediately desired to see what Comstock was persecuting, so they could decide whether he was acting correctly or in error.

In 1882, Emperor Franz Joseph I commissioned construction of the Villa Hermes at Lainz (near Vienna) for his Empress, thereby specifying that the bedroom decor be inspired by Shakespeare's A Midsummer Night's Dream. Makart designed for him a dreamworld decoration as a large painting (1882) that is still extant. Unfortunately his design was never executed after his early death in 1884. His collection of antiques and art consisted of 1083 pieces and was put up for auction by art dealer Hugo Othmar Miethke.

Salzburg's Makart Square, or Makartplatz, was named after the painter.

== Art ==
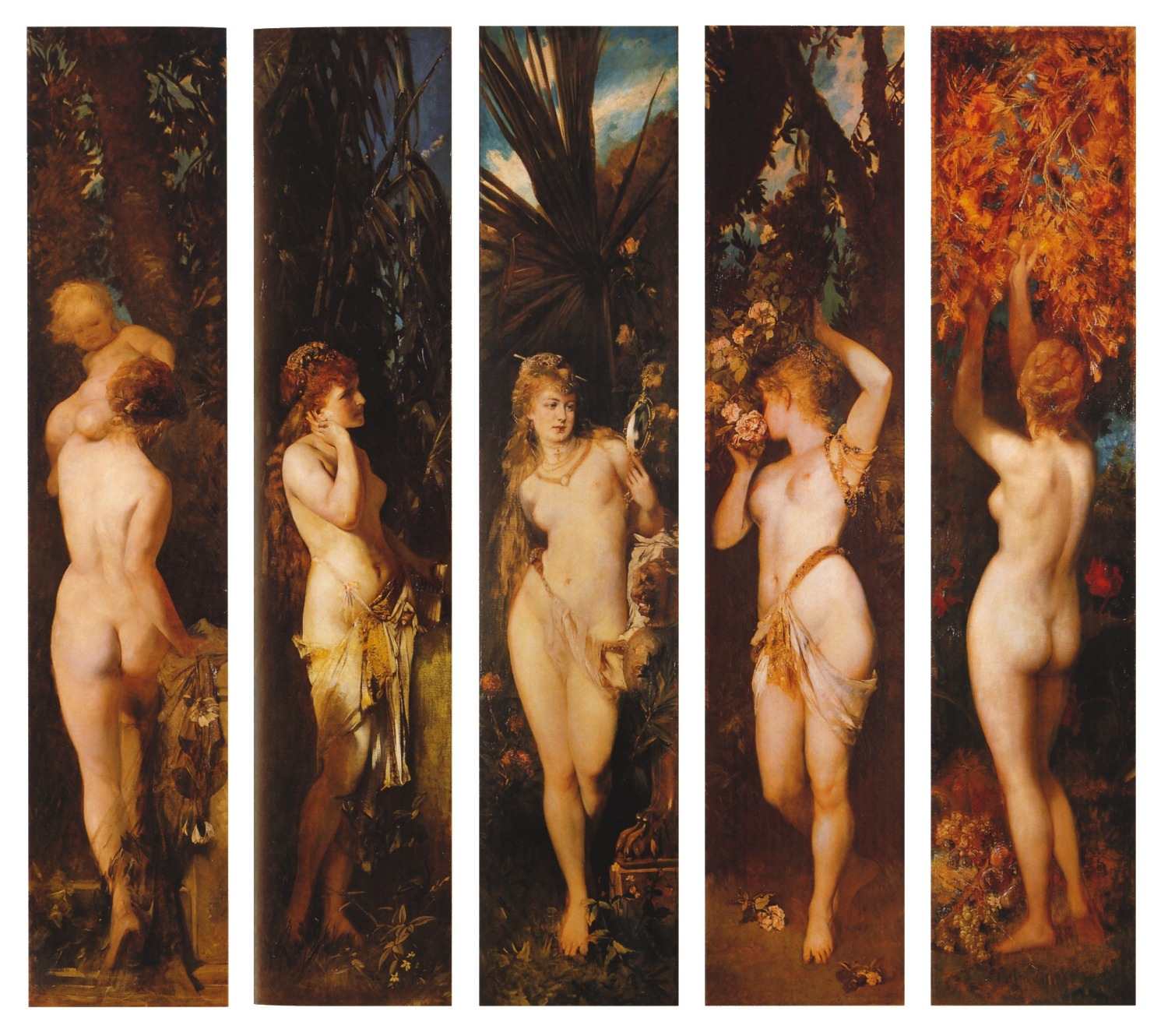
The Five Senses (Makart)

The "Makartstil", which determined the culture of an entire era in Vienna, was an aestheticism the likes of which had never previously been seen, and have not been replicated to this day either. Dubbed "the magician of colours", he painted in brilliant colours and fluid shapes which prioritised design and aesthetics in the work above all other matters. He frequently introduced asphalt into his paint in order to enhance the impact of his colours, which has led to some deterioration in his paintings over the years. The paintings were usually large-scale, theatrical reproductions of historical motifs. Works such as The Papal Election reveal Makart's skill in the bold use of colour to convey drama, as well as his virtuoso draughtsmanship which he succeeded in developing later on.

Makart was deeply interested in the interaction of all the visual arts and therefore in the implementation of the idea of the "total work of art" which dominated discussions on the arts in the 19th century. This was the ideal which he realised in magnificent festivities which he organised and centred on himself. The 1879 Makart Parade was the culmination of all these endeavours. Makart was also a friend of the composer Richard Wagner, and it could be argued that the two developed the same concepts and stylistic tendencies in their differing art forms: a concern for embedding historical and mythological motifs in a framework of aestheticism, making their respective works historical pageants.

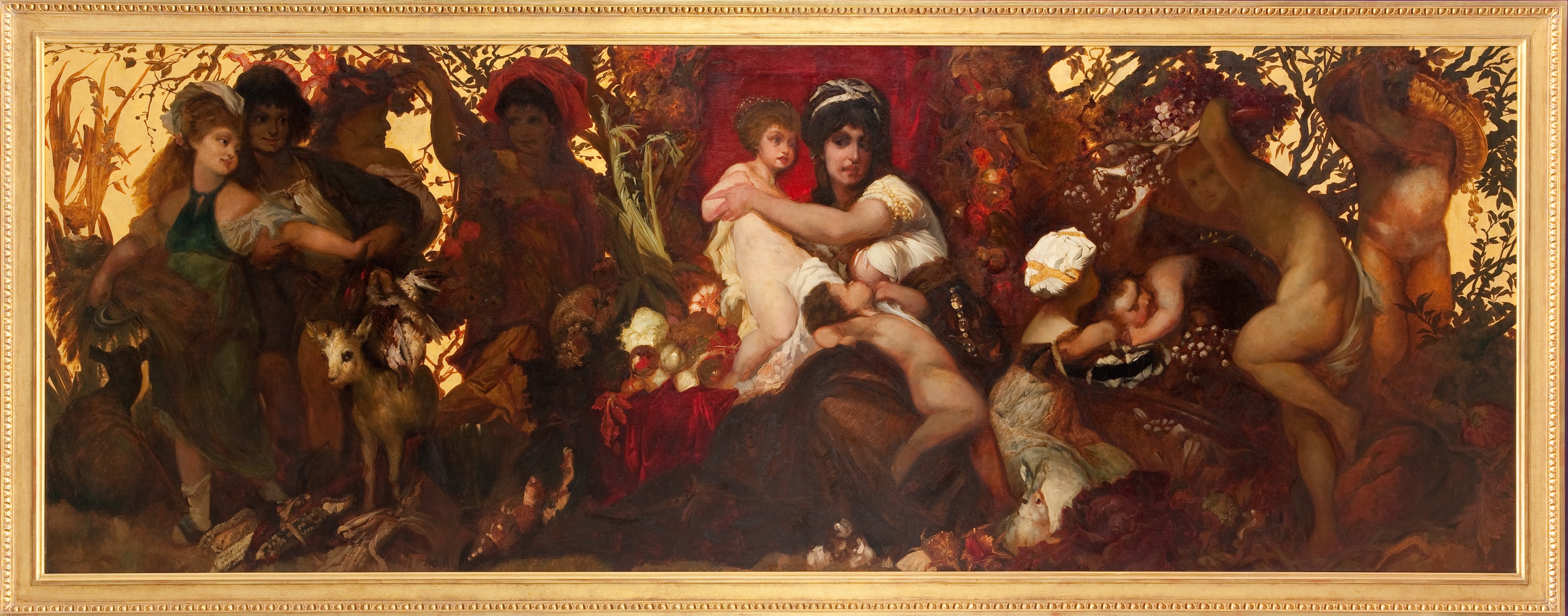
Abundantia, Gifts of the Earth. Oil on canvas w/gold paint. Pendant of the Abundantia, Gifts of the Sea in Musée d'Orsay. On long-term loan to Museum Boijmans van Beuningen, Rotterdam.

Makart's work, like those of other academic artists of the time, consisted of allegorical painting and history painting as seen in Catherina Carnaro, Diana's Chase, The Entry of Charles V into Antwerp, Abundantia, Spring, Summer, The Death of Cleopatra, The Five Senses, and Bacchus and Ariadne. He was considered the Austrian equivalent of the French artist William-Adolphe Bouguereau. In Austria, his closest rival was considered to be Hans Canon, and he was associated with the sculptor Viktor Tilgner, who travelled with him to Italy.

== Influence ==
Apart from his obvious influence on Viennese academic art and high culture at that time, Makart also influenced a range of painters and decorators who followed him, including many who rebelled against his style – the most notable being Gustav Klimt, who is said to have idolised him. Klimt's early style is based in historicism and has similarities to Makart's paintings. The entire decorative focus of the Secession, the Austrian Art Nouveau of which Klimt was a part, arose in an environment in which Makart had prioritised the decorative aspects of art. Some people have also suggested that the primacy of sexual symbolism in Art Nouveau artworks were influenced by the sensuality in many of Makart's paintings.

== Works ==
Hans Makart's paintings

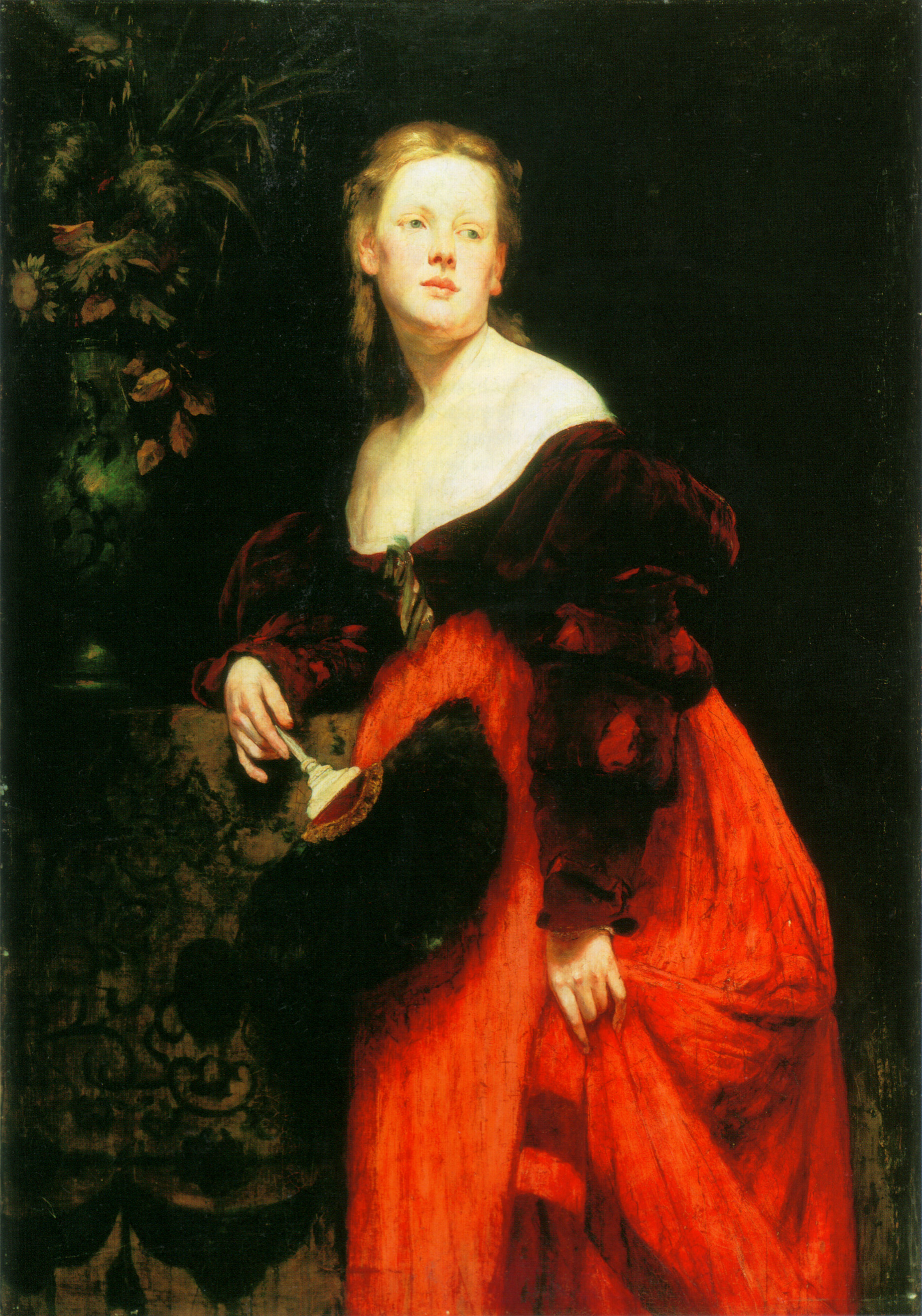
Caroline Gomperz (1870)

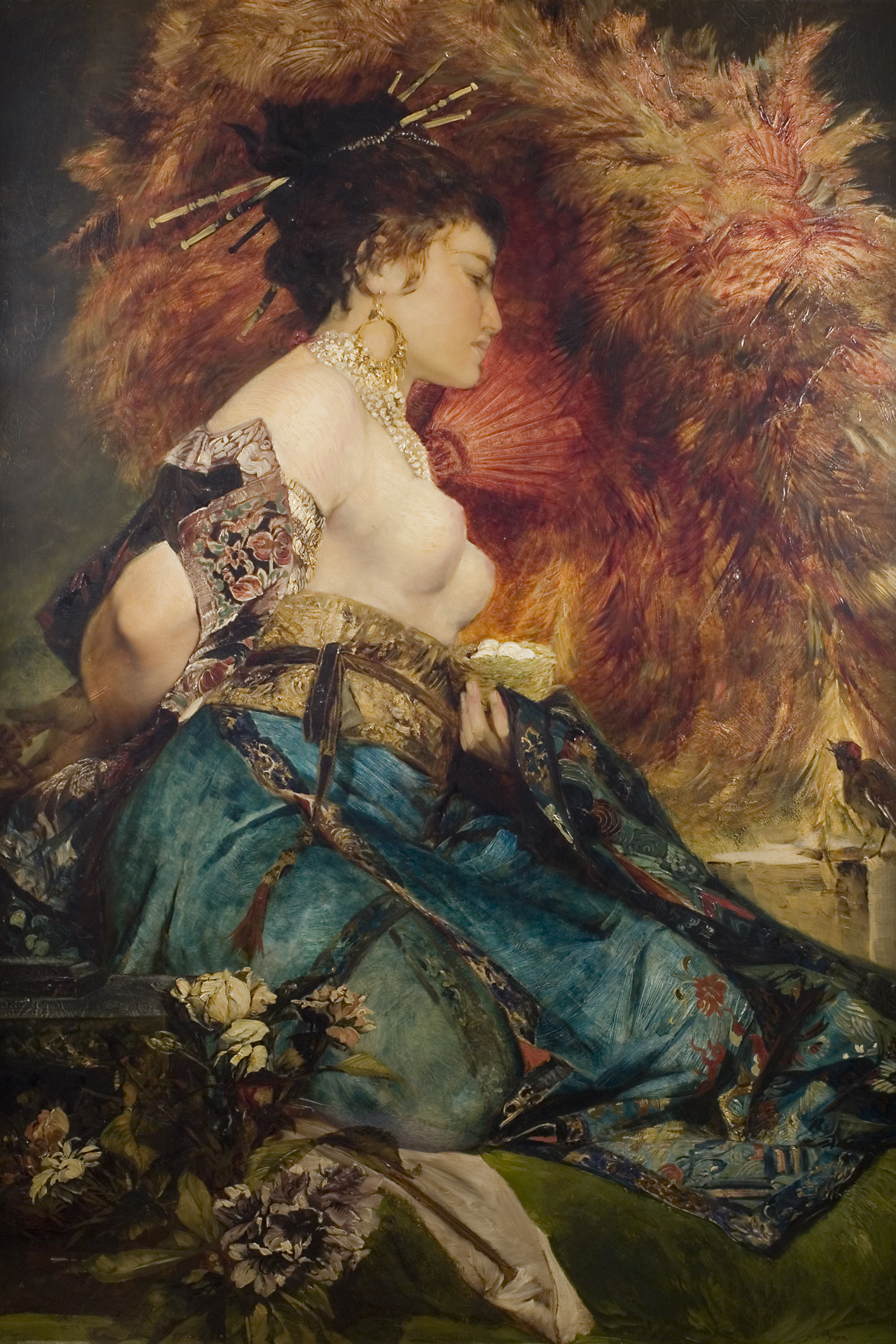
Japanese kimono (c. 1870–1875)

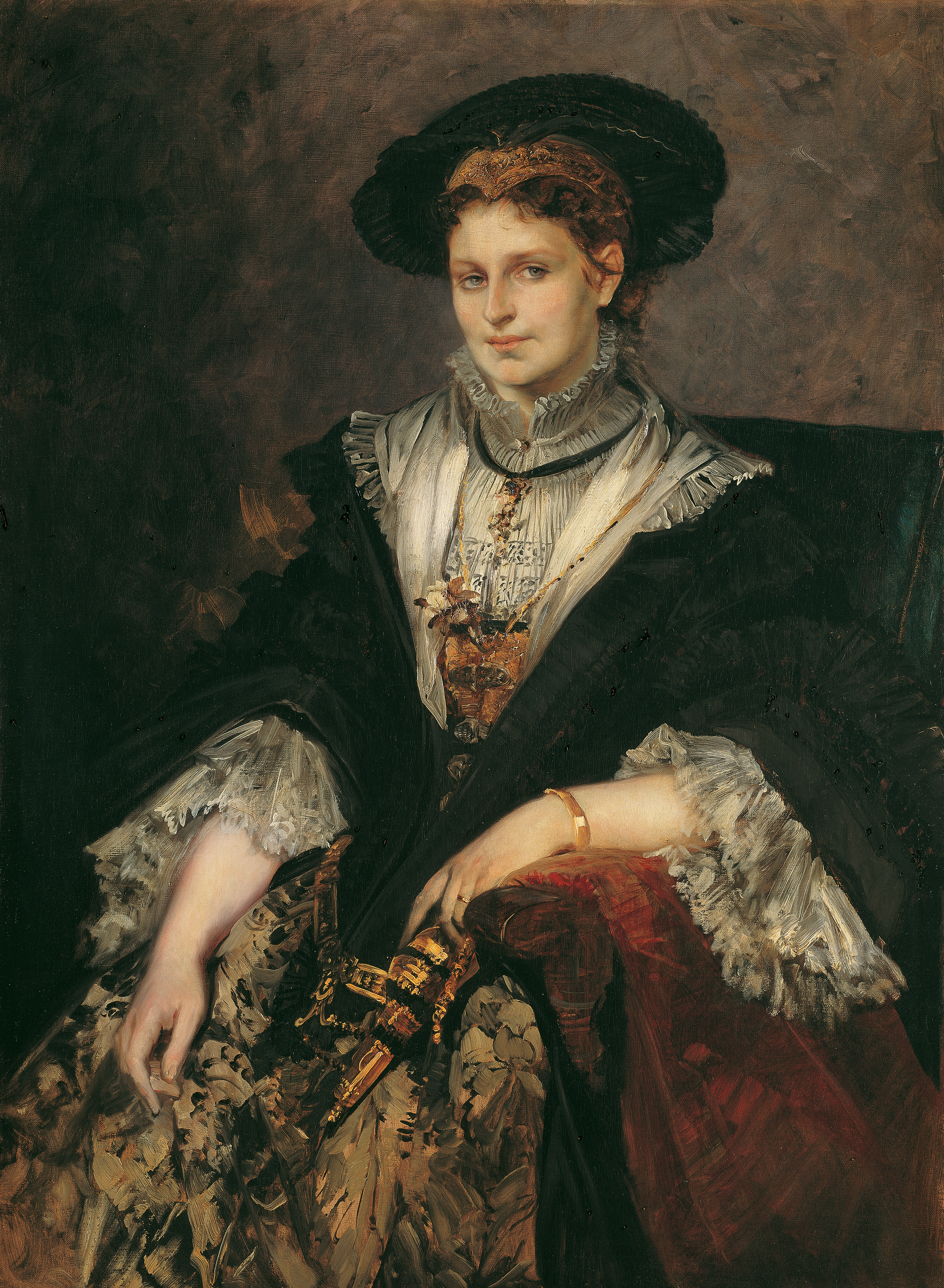
Bertha von Piloty (1872–1873)

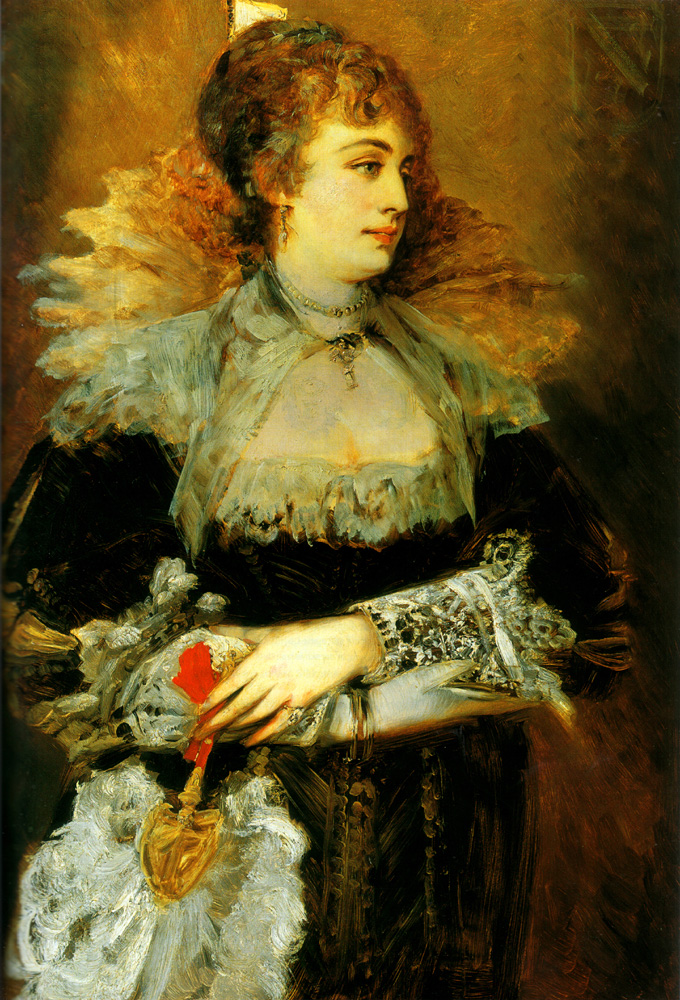
Hanna Klinkosch (1875)

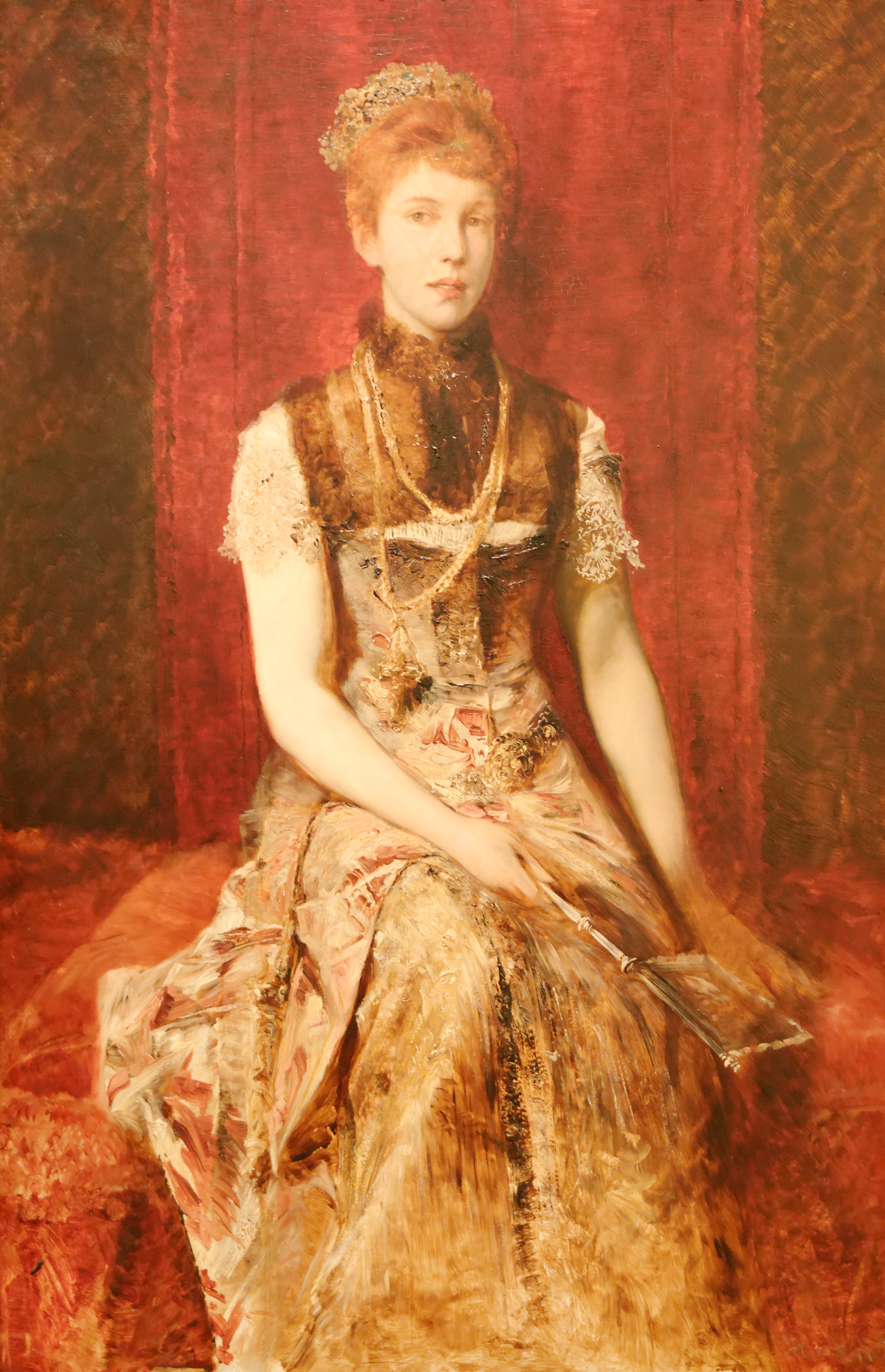
Portrait of Dora Fournier-Gabillon (c. 1879)

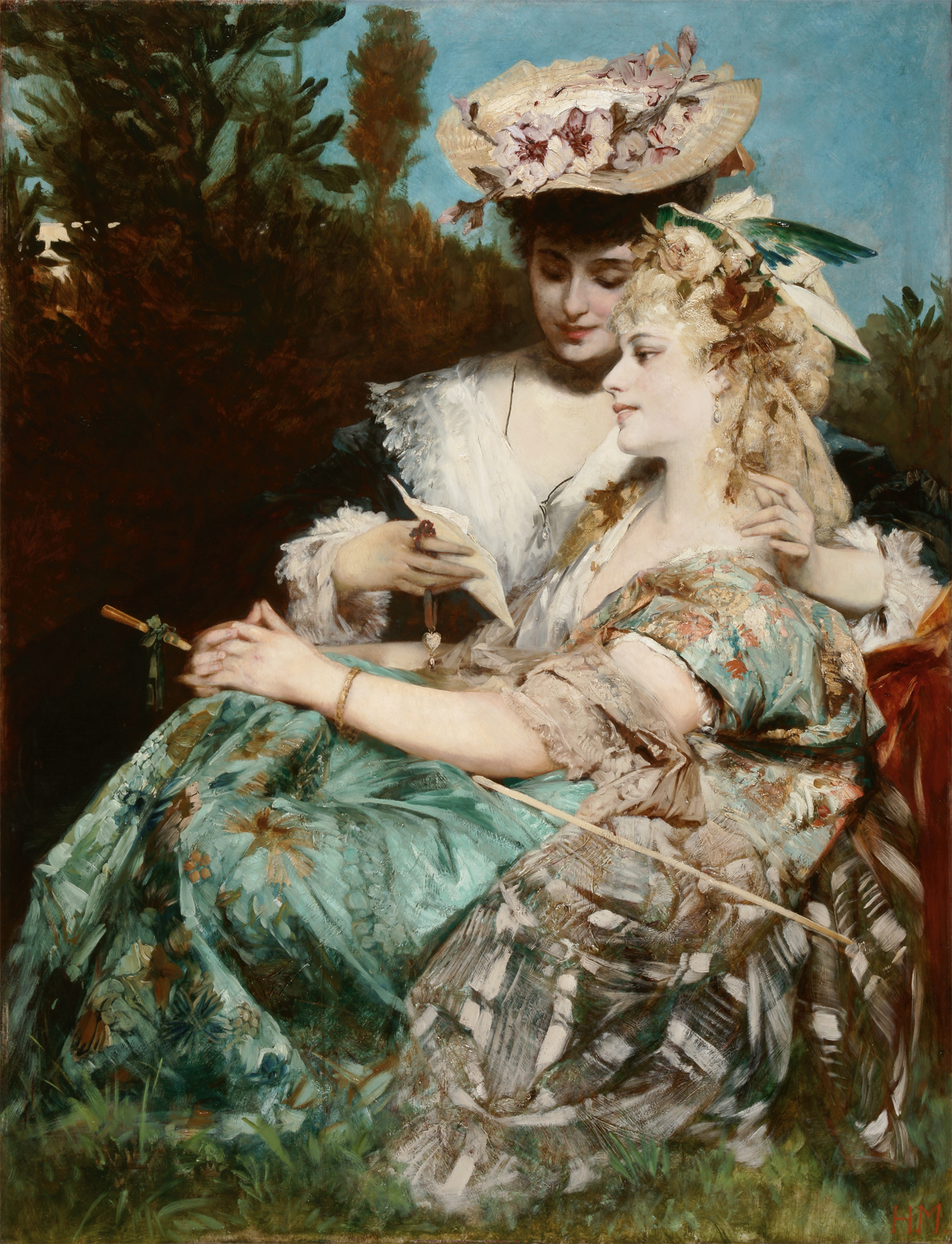
The love letter (1875)

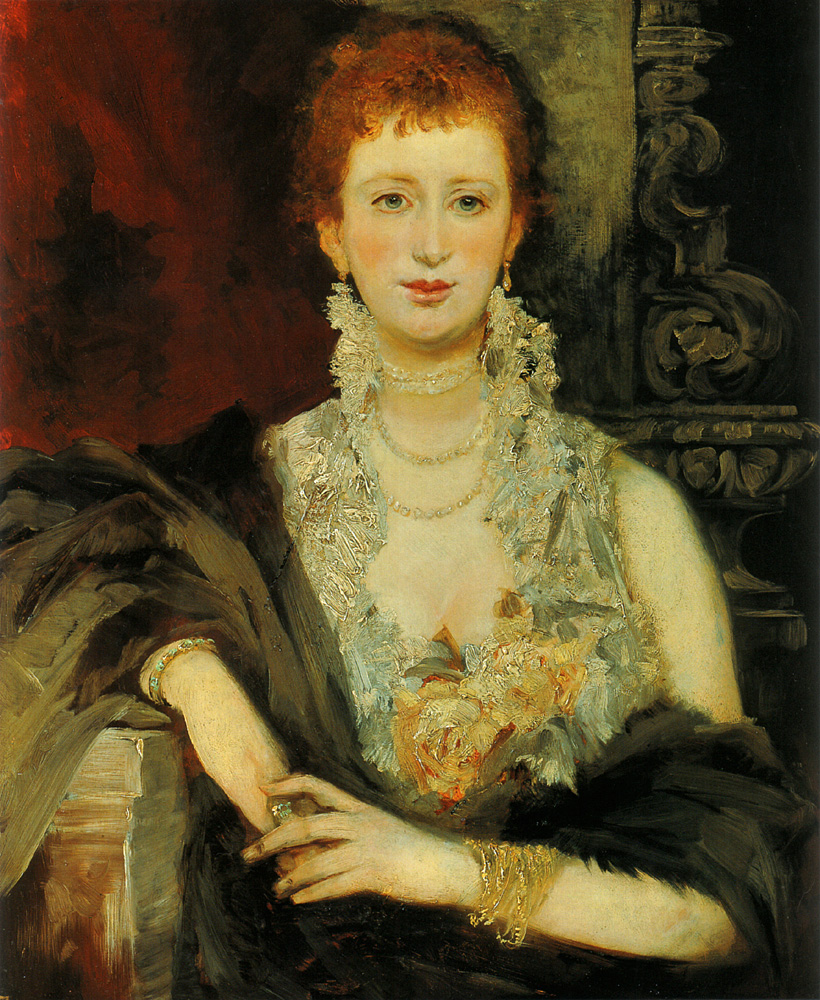
Clothilde Beer (c. 1880)

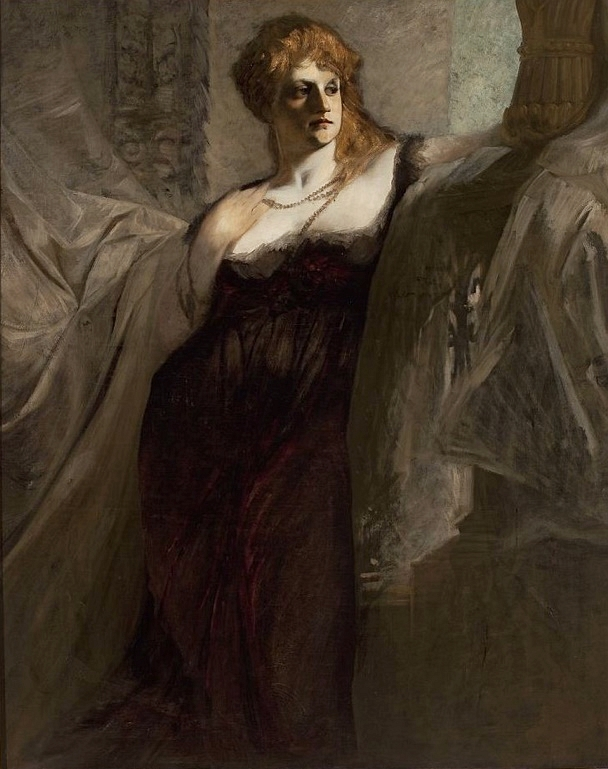
Portrait of a young woman (1882–1884), National Museum, Warsaw

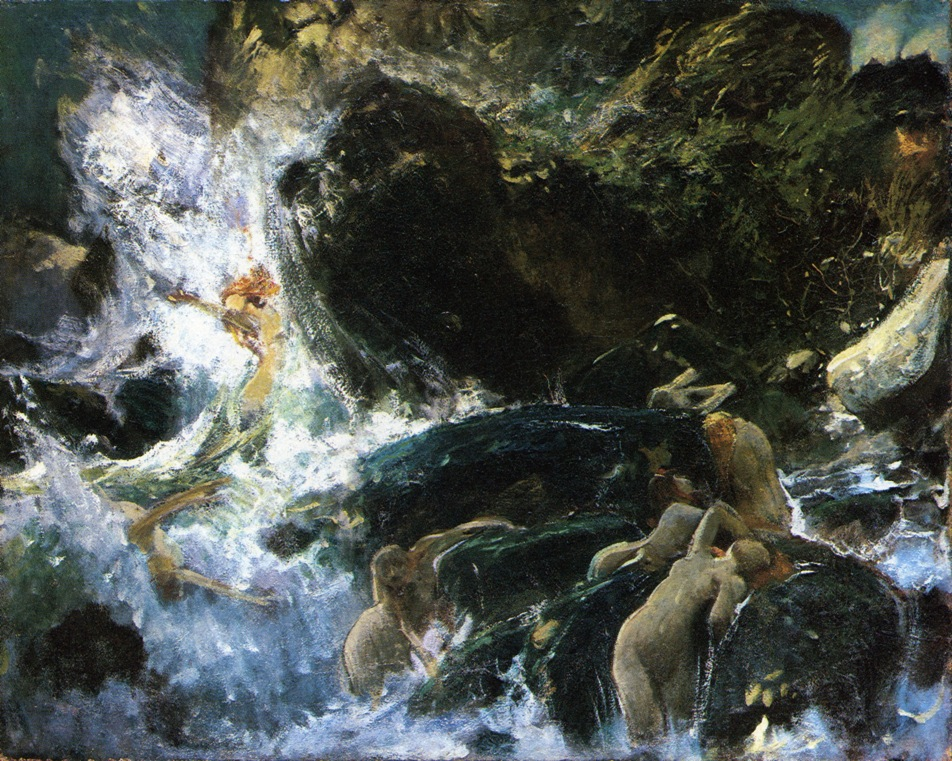
The Rhinemaidens (c. 1883)

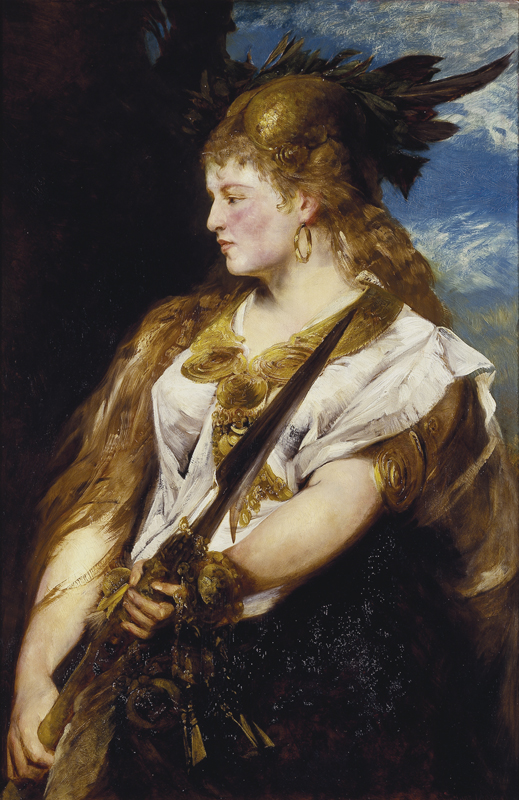
The Valkyrie (1877)

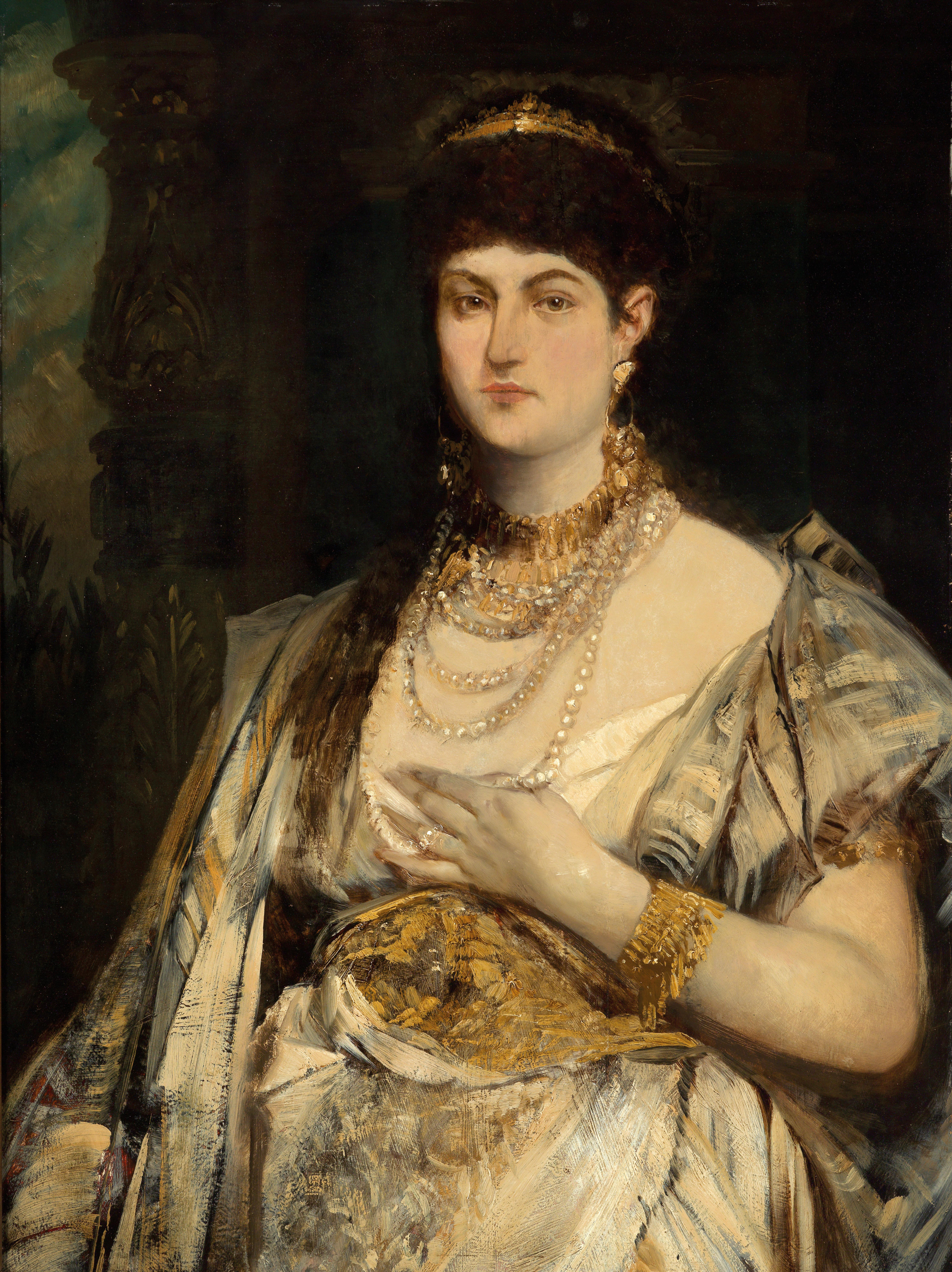
Henriette Mankiewicz

== See also ==
- List of Orientalist artists
- Orientalism
