= Hugo Othmar Miethke =

German art dealer (1834-1918)

- Born: Hugo Hermann Werner Othmar Miethke; 29 July 1834; Potsdam, Brandenburg, Germany.
- Died: 11 January 1918 (aged 83); Celje, Slovenia
- Occupation: Art dealer
- Spouse: Marie Canzi
- Children: Otto Maria Miethke
- Awards: Order of Pope Pius IX (1890); Order of the Cross of Takovo (1890)

Hugo Othmar Miethke (29 July 1834 – 11 January 1918), also known as H.O. Miethke, was a German art dealer who established an art gallery in Vienna, Austria.

== Early life ==
Hugo Hermann Werner Othmar Miethke was born on 29 July 1834 in Potsdam, Brandenburg, Kingdom of Prussia.

== Career ==
Hugo Othmar Miethke partnered with Carl Josef Wawra in 1861 to establish 'Miethke & Wawra,' an art dealership in Vienna, Austria. After more than a decade, the art dealers ended their business partnership, with the Commercial Courts of Vienna recording its removal from the registry by February 1874. Miethke, as the sole proprietor of the business, established it under his own name as Galerie H.O. Miethke.

By 1876, the art dealer was set up on Plankengasse 6 in Vienna. In February 1886, the Commercial Court of Vienna officially appointed and certified him as a master exhibitor and expert in paintings, art objects, and antiques.

Emperor Franz Joseph I granted Miethke in August 1890 the right to bear the Knight's Cross of the Papal Order of Pope Pius IX and the Serbian Order of the Cross of Takovo.

Miethke purchased the palace of Alexander Nákó (now known as Palais Eskeles) at Dorotheergasse 11 in Vienna's Innere Stadt. The land register recorded the transfer of the real estate from Ignaz Fleischer and Solomon Stein to H.O. Miethke on 18 April 1895. During that year, he commissioned Kupka & Orglmeister, a Vienna-based architecture firm, to redesign the palace for his gallery.

Upon retiring in 1904, he transferred ownership of his gallery to Hans Weidenbusch on 31 May 1904. The art business was sold again by November 1904 to Paul Bacher who was linked to the Vienna Secession and designated Austrian painter Carl Moll as the new creative director.

== Death ==
Hugo Othmar Miethke died on 11 January 1918 at Gutenegg Castle near County of Cilli (now Celje, Slovenia).

== Family ==
In 1869, Miethke's first wife, Anna von Carpentier, died at the age of 32. He remarried in 1881 to Marie Canzi, daughter of the painter August Alexius Canzi. Their son, Otto Maria Miethke, gained recognition for his talents in painting, graphic design, and songwriting after studying at the Vienna School of Arts and Crafts with Koloman Moser. By 1936, Dorotheum acquired the Nákó Palace from the heirs of H.O. Miethke.
