= Wilhelm Bernatzik =

Austrian painter (1853–1906)

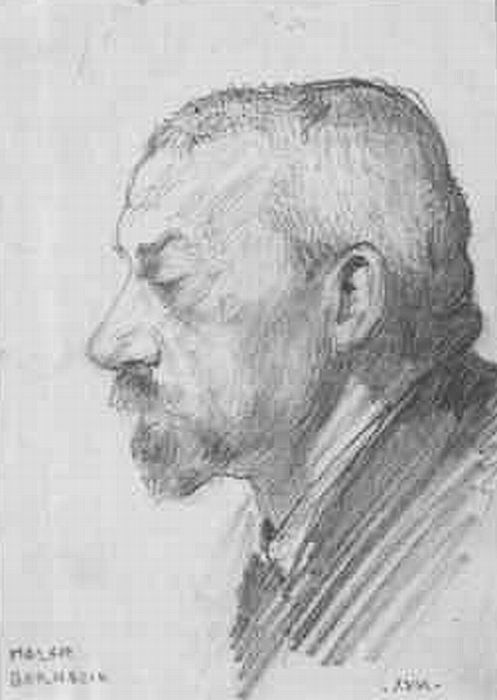
Self-portrait

Wilhelm Bernatzik (18 May 1853 – 25 or 26 November 1906) was a painter from Austria-Hungary.

== Life ==
Bernatzik was born in Mistelbach, Austrian Empire. He was the brother of the constitutional law teacher Edmund Bernatzik. Initially a law student at his father's request, he studied at the Special School for Landscape Painting at the Academy of Fine Arts, Vienna under Eduard Peithner von Lichtenfels from 1873 to 1875. In 1875, he received the Golden Füger-Medal and studied at the Kunstakademie Düsseldorf until 1878. Finally, he finished his training in Paris with Léon Bonnat. In 1880 he joined the Vienna Künstlerhaus. He painted The Vision of St Bernhard in 1882 in Heiligenkreuz Abbey, having been attracted by the mood of the Gothic place. At the 1894 World Exhibition in Antwerp, he won a medal (second class). In 1897 he was a founding member of the Vienna Secession, and served as the group's president in 1902–03. With the art critic Julius Meier-Graefe he organised a successful Impressionist exhibition in Vienna in 1903. Together with the group around Gustav Klimt, he left the Secession in 1905.

He died in Hinterbrühl in his brother Marx's house. He was buried in Hinterbrühl cemetery. In 1907, the Galerie Miethke in Vienna held a retrospective exhibition on his life.

== Style ==
Bernatzik was primarily a landscape painter, taking motifs from Vienna and Lower Austria and preferring to paint en plein air. During his time in Paris, he absorbed Impressionist tastes. However, he also created genre paintings, including processions in landscapes and symbolic images. He was one of the art's main representatives in Vienna at the turn of the century.

== Selected works ==
- Corridor approaching Dürnstein, (St Pölten, Niederösterreiches Landesmuseum, inventory number KS-1838), 1881, oil on canvas, 73.2×129 cm
- The Vision of St Bernhard (Vienna, Österreichische Galerie Belvedere, inventory number 2705), 1882, oil on canvas, 105×201 cm
- The Messenger of Salvation – Versehgang (St Pölten, Niederösterreiches Landesmuseum, inventory number KS-6627), 1887, oil on canvas, 91.5×186 cm
- Winter (Vienna, Österreichische Galerie Belvedere, inventory number 797), 1888, oil on canvas, 96×78 cm
- Bemused (Brno, Moravskie Galerie Brno), 1898, oil on canvas
- Pond (Vienna, Österreichische Galerie Belvedere, inventory number 6557), 1900, oil on canvas, 100×71 cm

== Gallery ==
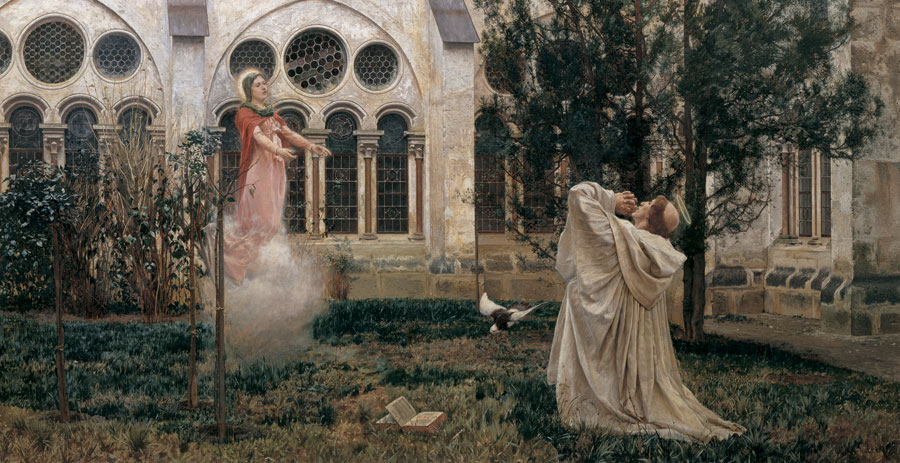
The Vision of Saint Bernard

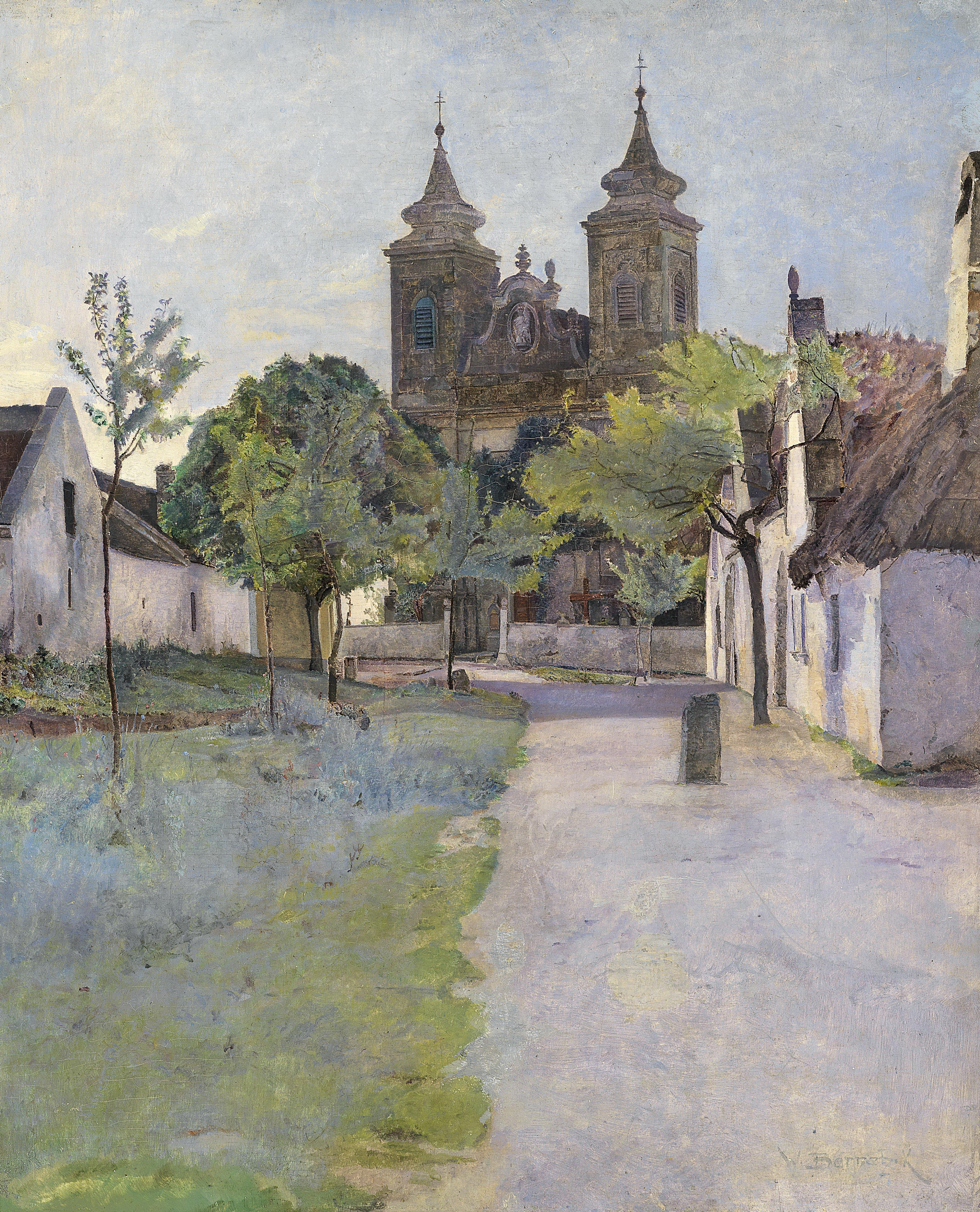
View of a Church Square

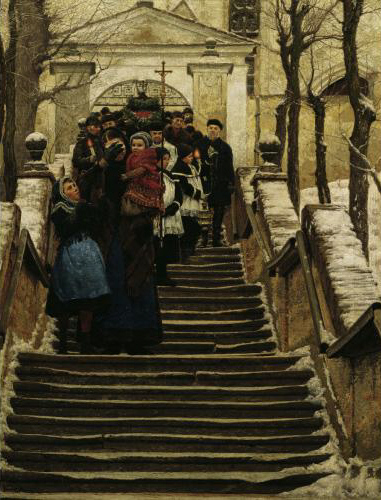
Winter (1888)

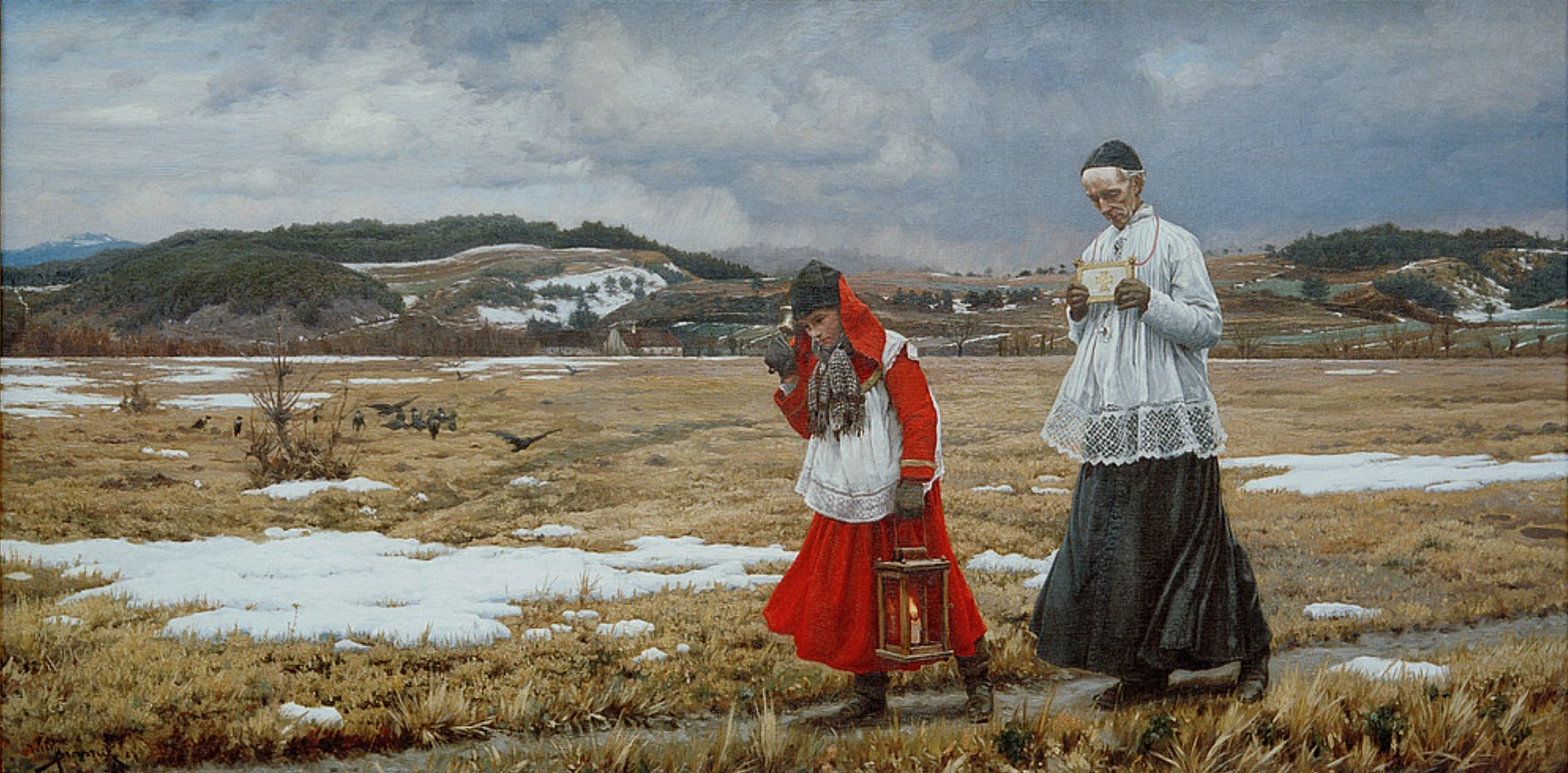
The Messengers of Salvation (1887)

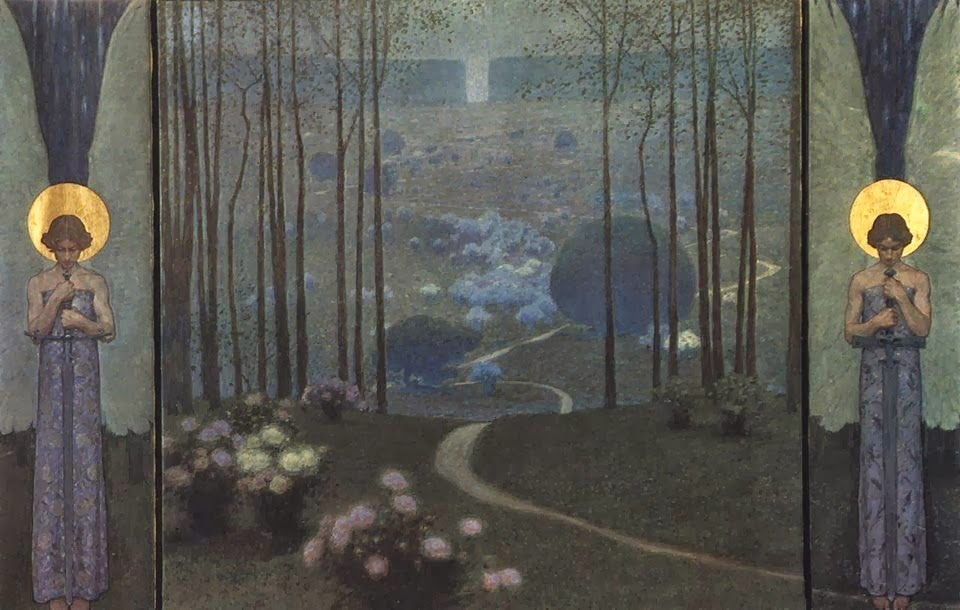
Entrance to Paradise
