= Kaasgrabenkirche =

Coordinates: 48°15′12″N 16°19′59″E

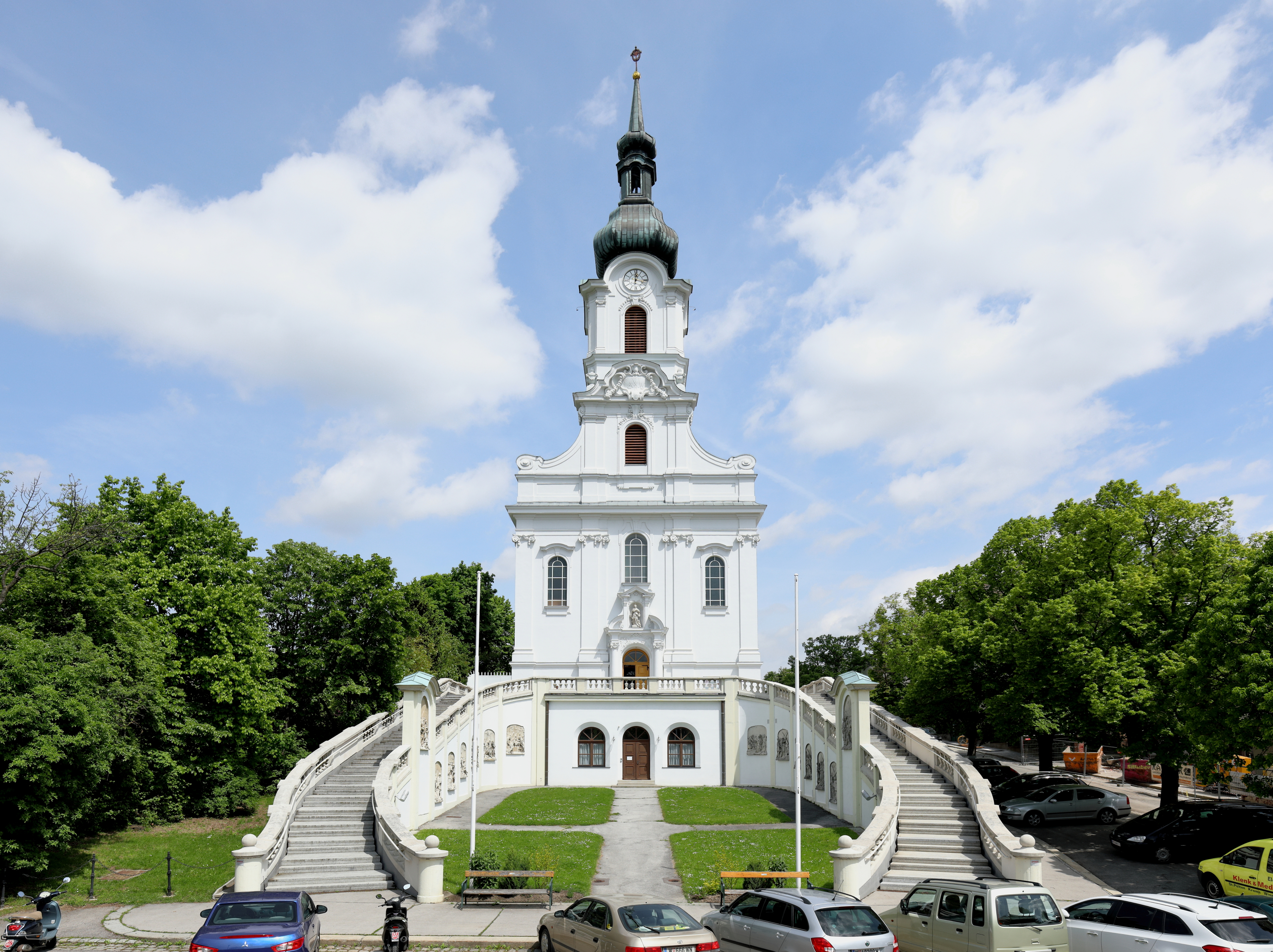
Kaasgrabenkirche

The Kaasgrabenkirche, also known as the Wallfahrtskirche “Mariä Schmerzen”, is a Roman Catholic parish and pilgrimage church in the suburb of Grinzing in the 19th district of Vienna, Döbling. The church has been managed since 1903 by the order of the Oblates of St. Francis de Sales and is equally the seat of the branch of the order covering Austria and Southern Germany. It has had the status of a parish church since 1939.

The name Kaasgrabenkirche hearkens back to an old name for the local area, which probably indicates the presence of water (mineral springs) that were rich in iron and sulphur. The smell and colour of this water resembled whey, which is sometimes referred to as Käsewasser (literally, cheese water) in German. References survive from 1280 to Chezwazzeresgraben and from 1331 to Cheswassergraben.

== History ==
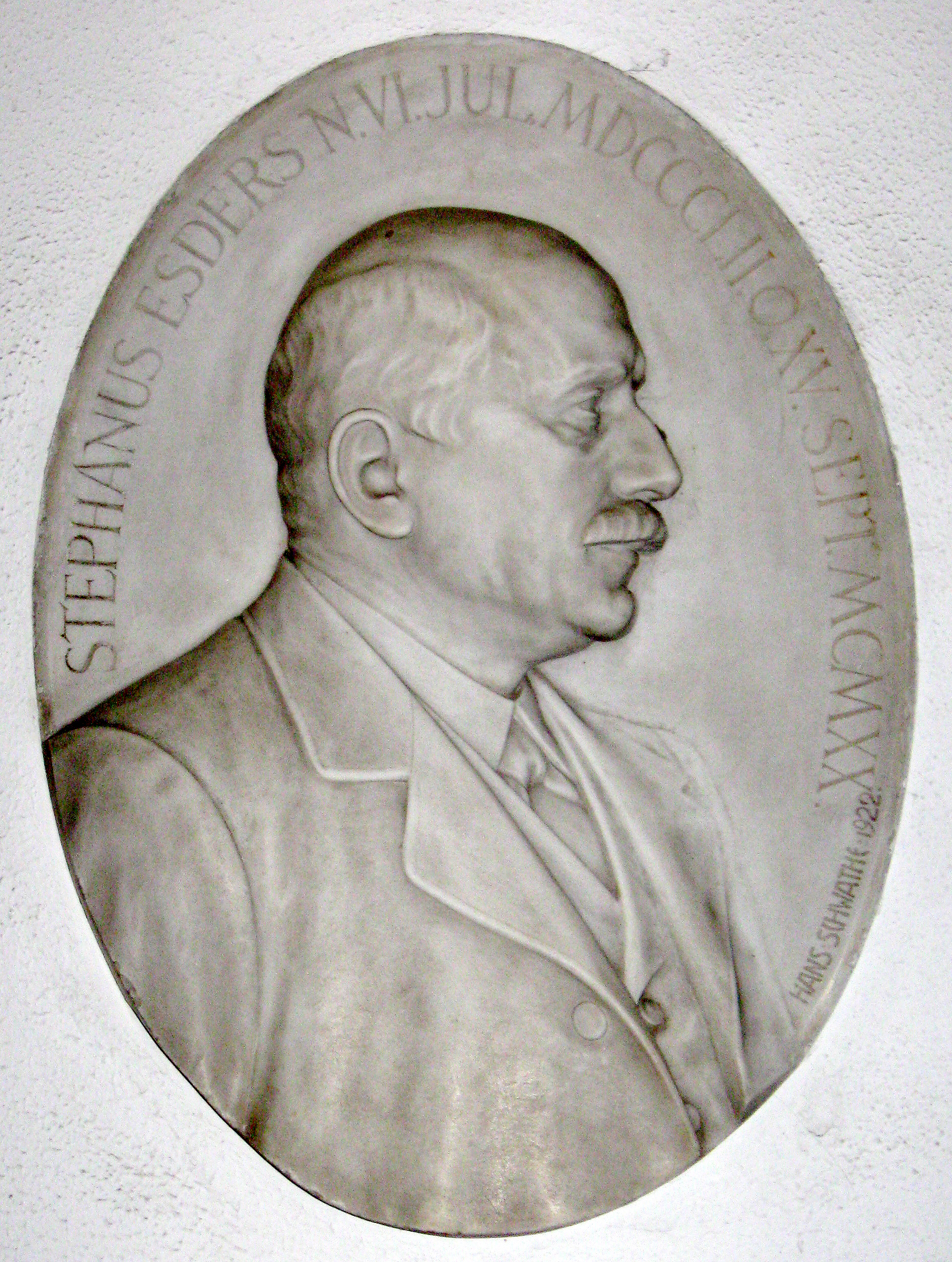
A portrait of the church benefactor Stefan Esders located in the entrance to the church (by Hans Schwathe, 1922)

There is a legend concerning the Kaasgrabenkirche that takes place during the second siege of Vienna in 1683. According to the legend, a young woman was scavenging for berries with her child when she was surprised by Turkish soldiers. She hid behind an elderberry bush. The soldiers followed her footprints to the bush but, seeing swallows nesting in the branches, assumed that no-one could be hiding there. The woman donated a Bildstock dedicated to Mary as a sign of her gratitude. There is however no evidence that such a shrine ever existed.

The land on which the church now stands belonged in the 19th century to a Mr. Kothbauer, an industrial magnate who owned sand pits in the Kaasgraben area. He also owned a house in the 7th district, Neubau, near the St.-Ulrichskirche (St. Ulrich's Church). When his house was torn down, he relocated a much-revered pietà statue from its courtyard to the site of the Kaasgrabenkirche, and, to mark the 200th anniversary of the young woman's rescue from the Turkish soldiers in the legend, built a small chapel over the statue in 1883. Kothbauer also opened a Heuriger next to the chapel. Sellers of devotional objects and musicians who performed in the restaurant were quickly attracted to the site. Kothbauer added swings and a shooting gallery, so that the “Schwalbenkapelle” (“Swallows’ Chapel”, as it was known, in reference to the legend) quickly became famous as the “Kapelle mit Heurigenschank” (“The chapel with the bar”). Given Kothbauer's fine business sense, it has even been suggested that he invented the legend and had it reported in the newspapers. Kothbauer's success was such that many Heurige in Sievering and Grinzing saw it as a threat to their business and the “pious” enterprise was closed in 1903.

Thereafter, the entrepreneur Stefan Esders, who owned a warehouse in Vienna, bought the property and had the chapel torn down. He built a villa with a park for himself and his family on a neighbouring plot and donated the funds to have a proper pilgrimage church built. Architects Gustav Orglmeister and Franz Kupka of Kupka & Orglmeister performed this task between 1909 and 1910. The foundation stone was laid on 26 April 1909 and the church was consecrated almost exactly a year later, on 30 April 1910, by auxiliary bishop Gottfried Marschall Kirche. Archduke Ferdinand Karl of Austria attended the consecration as representative of the emperor.

== Construction ==
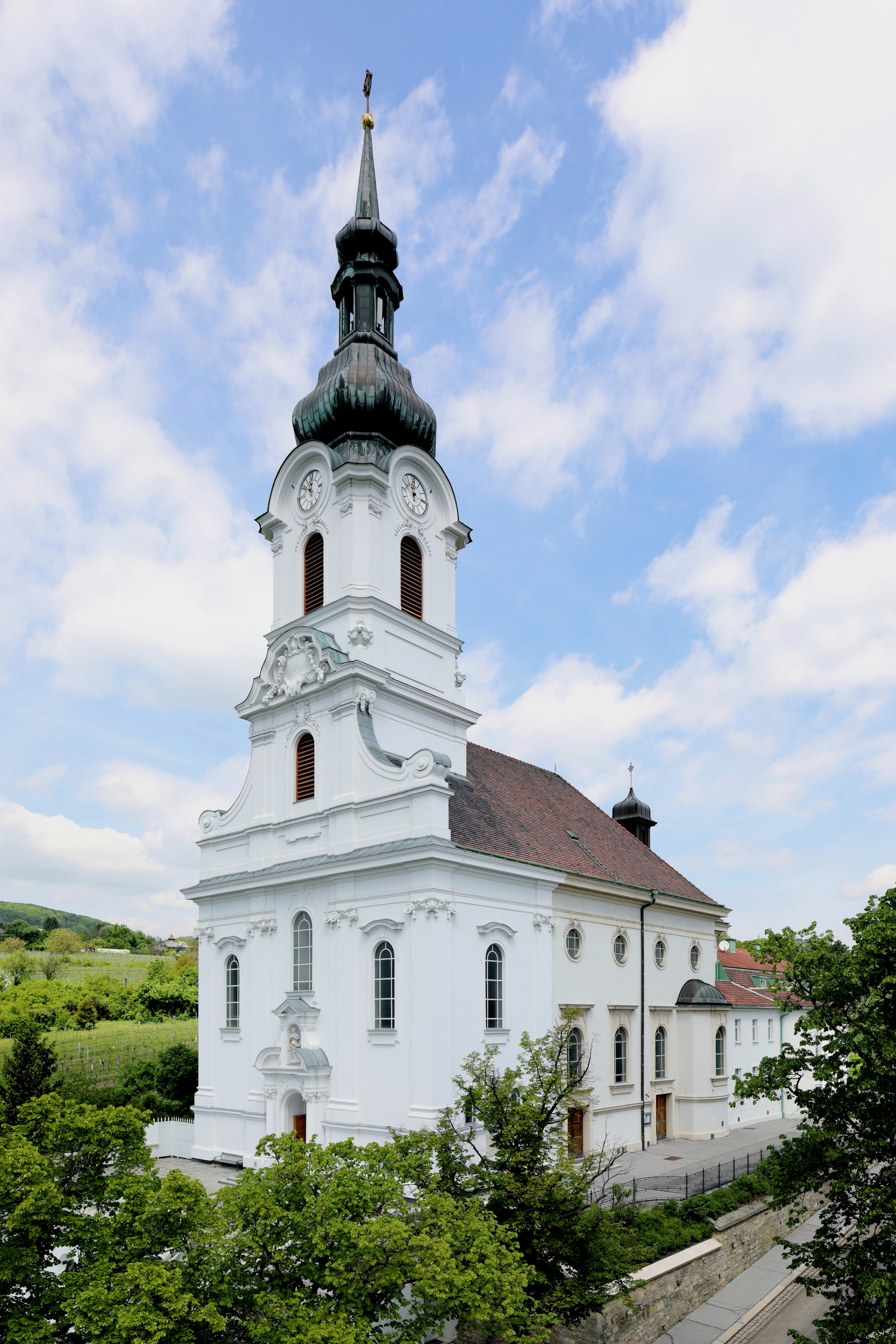
The Kaasgrabenkirche seen from the south side

The church was built in the neo-baroque style. The double staircases in front of the church are shaped like a horseshoe and are decorated on the inner wall with stone reliefs carved by Franz Abel and Paul Paintl and depicting the stations of the cross. The pictures inside the church of the stations of the cross are also the work of these two stonemasons. Stefan Esders’ portrait is carved in stone to the left of the entrance to the church. In the well-lit interior of the church, a visitor's eye is drawn to a baroque figure of the Madonna. The altarpiece behind the statue was created by Rudolf Fuchs and shows angels revering Mary. To the left and right of the altar are statues of Saint Francis de Sales and Saint Bernard of Clairvaux. In the entrance to the sacristy, there is a statue of Saint Louis (Louis IX of France) and, opposite this, a statue of Saint Henry II (Henry II, Holy Roman Emperor). Esders’ brothers were named Bernard, Louis and Henry.

Additions to the church's original interior include a modern chapel commemorating the Danube Swabians from Yugoslavia and Hungary. There is also a plaque commemorating the Catholic Hans Karl von Zessner-Spitzenberg, who was arrested here in 1938 and died a few months after having been interned in the Dachau concentration camp.

The church crypt, which was designed by Hans Schwathe, featured a marble tomb with a life-size depiction of the resurrection of Christ, in which the church's benefactor, Stefan Esders, was interred. The tomb and the votive offerings from the old chapel that had been stored here were destroyed in a bombing raid on 12 March 1945.

Another building, which from 1914 housed the congregation's theological college and a museum, stood next to the church until its destruction in 1945.
