= Henriette Mankiewicz =

Austrian art embroiderer

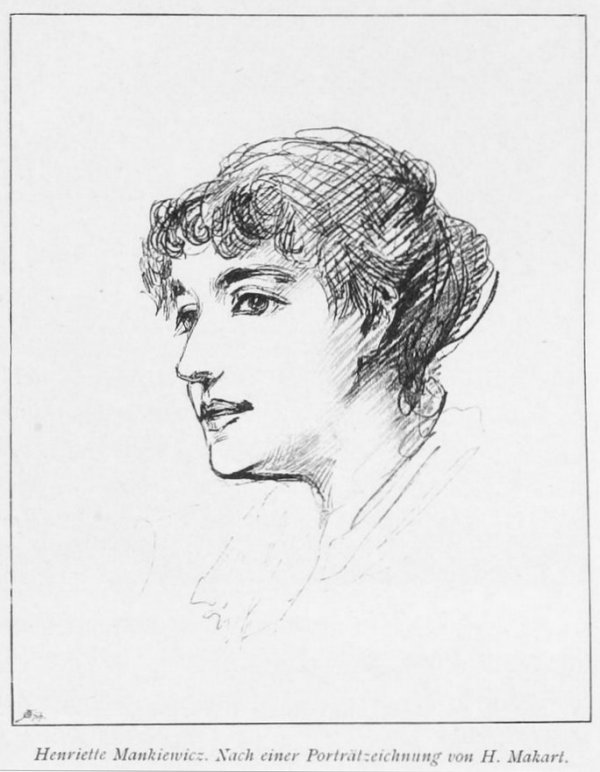
Illustration from The Graphic Arts 1899

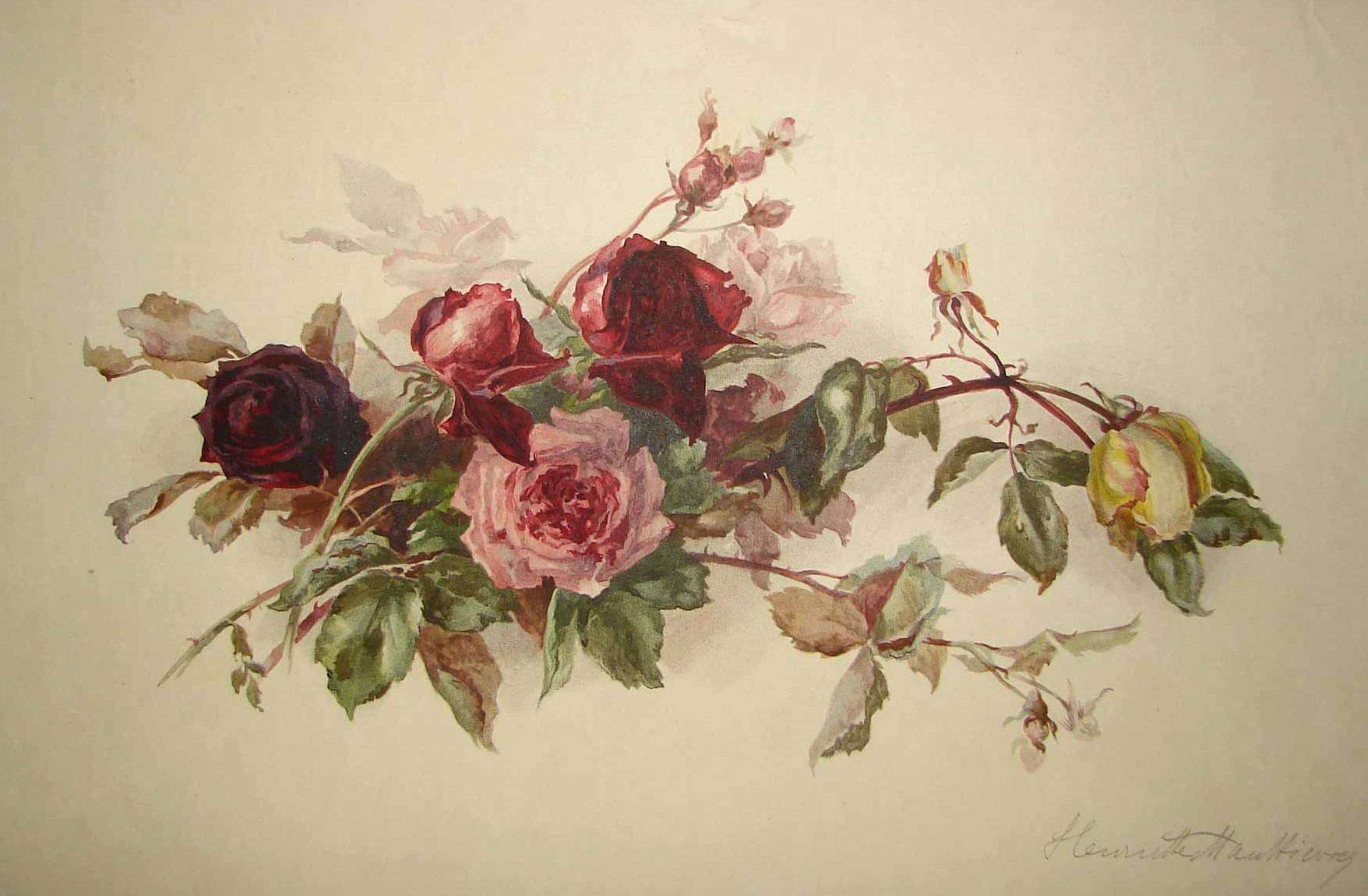
Henriette Mankiewicz: Rosenzweige, Aquarell, 1899

Henriette Mankiewicz (born 20 July 1852 in Vienna as Henriette Tauber; died 30 June 1906 in Bad Vöslau) was an art embroiderer from Austria-Hungary.

== Early life ==
Mankiewicz was the daughter of the stockbroker and writer Joseph Samuel Tauber (1824-1879) and his wife Louise, née Edle von Hönigsberg (1824-1894). Her great-grandfather Israel Hönig von Hönigsberg was a tobacco merchant and was the first Jew to be ennobled in Austria. The father's family was also of the Jewish faith. In 1872 she married the widowed Carl Mankiewicz (1834-1896) in Vienna. He served as Serbian consul general elect in Dresden, where the couple lived after their marriage. Her husband was buried in the New Israelite Cemetery in Dresden in 1896. She moved back to Vienna after his death and later converted to the Catholic faith. With Carl Mankiewicz she had a daughter Margarethe (1881-1938). She worked as a writer and translator and married the First Lieutenant and Serbian Consul General Ernst von Schuch. Margarethe von Schuch-Mankiewicz had also left Judaism in 1897 and lived in Rome from 1931 onwards.

== Woman in art ==
Mankiewicz grew up in an art-loving family. However, as a woman she was not allowed to study in an institution, so she received private art lessons from teachers like Hans Makart, who portrayed her several times. Influenced by Makart's taste for refined luxury, from 1888 she specialized in embroidered works of art.

Mankiewicz made decorative panneaus, mostly with flowers and landscapes. Her works - often called needle paintings - were often a combination of different techniques - embroidery, painting and sewing on silk. Her works were shown in numerous German cities. At the Paris World's Fair in 1889, her works were on display in the Austrian section to acclaim. Subsequently, she was honored with a medal by the jury of the World's Fair and, at the suggestion of the painters Ernest Meissonier, Léon Bonnat and Émile Auguste Carolus-Duran, received the distinction of Officier de l'Academie. She received further medals in Prague and in the Netherlands. In 1894 she successfully exhibited her so-called giant paintings in Berlin. She also collected art, and donated the painting Houses in Argenteuil by Claude Monet to the National Gallery in 1898.

Mankiewicz maintained a literary salon that was known far beyond the city's borders. She was friends with the composer Gustav Mahler.

== Literature ==
- Malerinnen. Vol. 2. A. H. Payne. 1900. pp. 416–417.
- Hermann Clemens Kosel (Hrsg.): Deutsch-österreichisches Künstler- und Schriftsteller-Lexikon. Verlag der Gesellschaft für graphische Industrie, Wien 1906, Band II, S. 44.
- Kunstchronik. N. F. II, 1891, 205 f.; XVII 491.
- Die graph. Künste. XXII (1899) 104/06, m. Taf.
- Kunst u. Kunsthandwerk. VI (1903) 508/12, mit 6 Abb.
- Gazette des Beaux-Arts. 1897, I 344 f.
- Helmut Brenner, Reinhold Kubik: Mahlers Menschen. Freunde und Weggefährten. Sankt Pölten – Salzburg – Wien 2014, ISBN 978-3-7017-3322-4, S. 153–157.
- Johanna Heinen: Ein „jüdisches“ Mäzenatentum für moderne französische Kunst? Das Fallbeispiel der Nationalgalerie im Berlin der wilhelminischen Ära (1882–1911): eine kultur- und sozialhistorische Studie. Peter Lang Edition, Frankfurt am Main 2016, ISBN 978-3-631-64864-3.
- Mankiewicz, Henriette. In: Hans Vollmer (Hrsg.): Allgemeines Lexikon der Bildenden Künstler von der Antike bis zur Gegenwart. Begründet von Ulrich Thieme und Felix Becker. Band 24: Mandere–Möhl. E. A. Seemann, Leipzig 1930, S. 18.
