= Palais Eskeles =

Palace in Vienna, Austria

Coordinates: 48°12′26.00″N 16°22′09.70″E

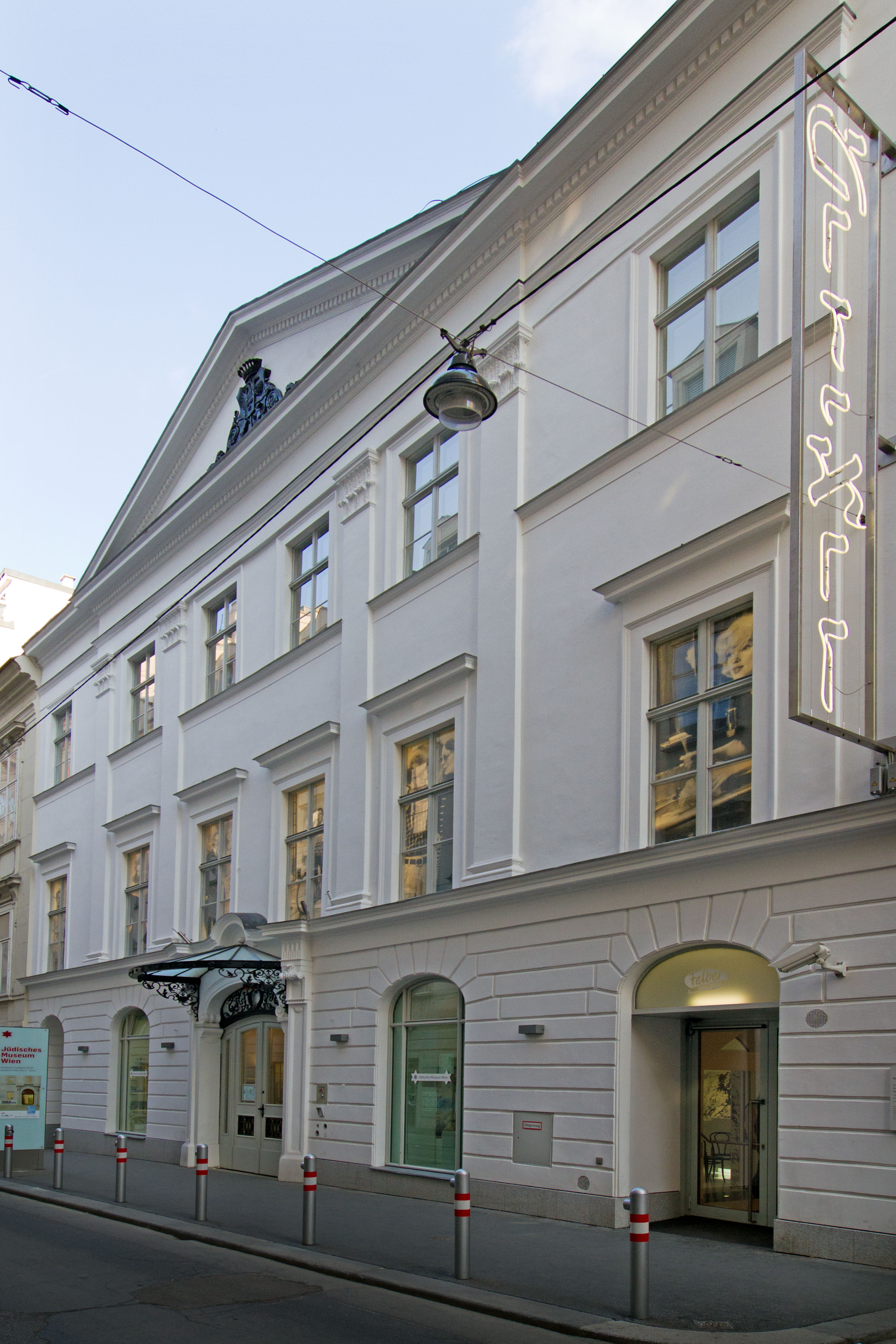
Palais Eskeles

Palais Eskeles is a historic palace in Vienna, Austria. The property traces its history to the 15th century.

It was once owned by the Jewish noble Eskeles family. Today, it houses the Jewish Museum Vienna. In 2024, the Jewish Museum Vienna celebrated their 30th anniversary of residence at Palais Eskeles.
