= Erika Abels d'Albert =

Austrian-German artist (1896–1975)

Erika Abels
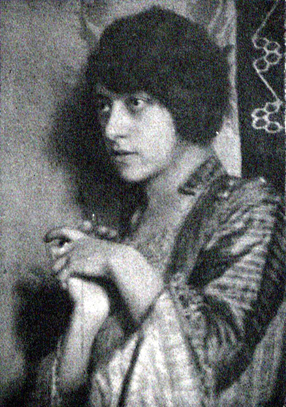
- Erika Abels, 1920
- Born: Erika Abels d'Albert; November 8, 1896; Berlin, Germany
- Died: 1975 (aged 78–79); Paris, France
- Known for: Painting; Graphic design

Erika Abels d'Albert (also known as Erika Abels) (1896–1975) was an Austrian painter and graphic artist.

== Life and work ==
Erika Abels d'Albert was the only child of Dr. Ludwig Abels, a Viennese art collector and writer who edited a satirical magazine. Her mother, Anna Emilie Mewes, was from the Berlin area. Abels d'Albert received a private education in Fine Arts in Vienna. In 1911/12 she studied with Irma Duczynska and in 1912/13 with Felix Albrecht Harta. She decided early to become a professional artist: at the age of 16 she participated in a group show (contributing portraits, nudes, still lifes and fashion designs). In subsequent years she participated in exhibitions at various galleries, at the Imperial and Royal Museum of Art and Industry, at the Temple of Theseus in the Volksgarten and at the Vienna Künstlerhaus. In 1930 she took part in the exhibition of the Austrian Association of Women Artists.

Between 1933 and 1935 she emigrated to Paris. She showed works in 1935 in the Gallery Gregoire Schustermann and in 1938 in the Salon d'Automne. After this her artistic activities are unknown.

Erika Abels d'Albert died in Paris in 1975.

She painted portraits, still lifes and nudes. There are only three works by her known to be extant in the original. The Vienna Museum owns her oil painting Strassenbahnschaffnerin from 1919, and in the Albertina are a charcoal drawing, Kopf einer Frau in mittleren Jahren (1924), and a chalk drawing, Sitzender Rückenakt (1921).
