= Klimt Villa =

Building in Hietzing, Austria

Coordinates: 48°11′19″N 16°16′59″E

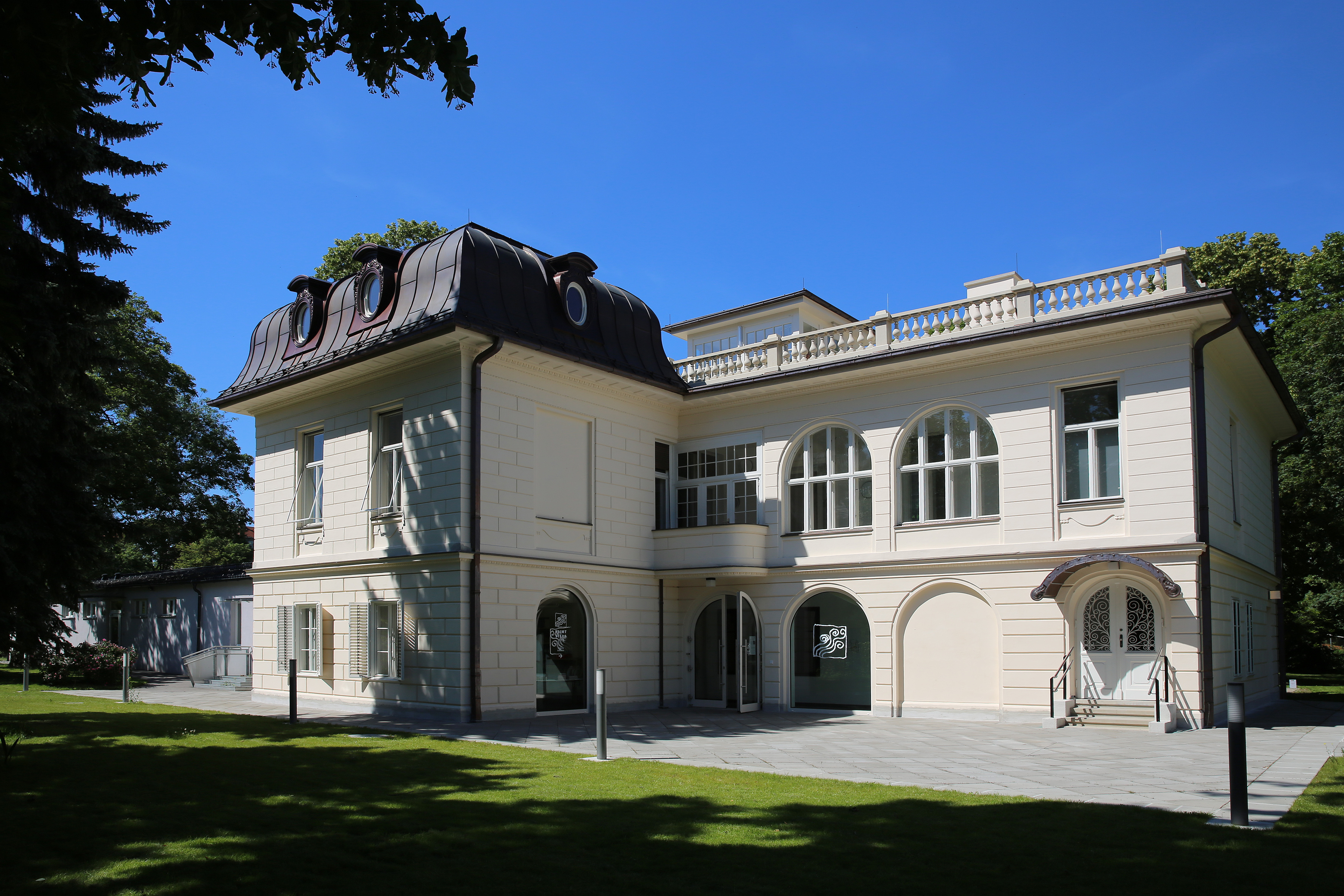
Klimt Villa (2013)

Klimt Villa (i.e. Villa Werner) is a building located in the Hietzing district of Vienna built in the early 1920s upon the last Viennese studio of the painter Gustav Klimt.

The association of the term villa with the name Klimt is ahistorical but has served since to promote the preservation of the building since the 1990s. Klimt did not live in a two-storey, upper-class villa but rather in an unadorned, single-storey country cottage.

== History ==
=== Klimt's atelier ===
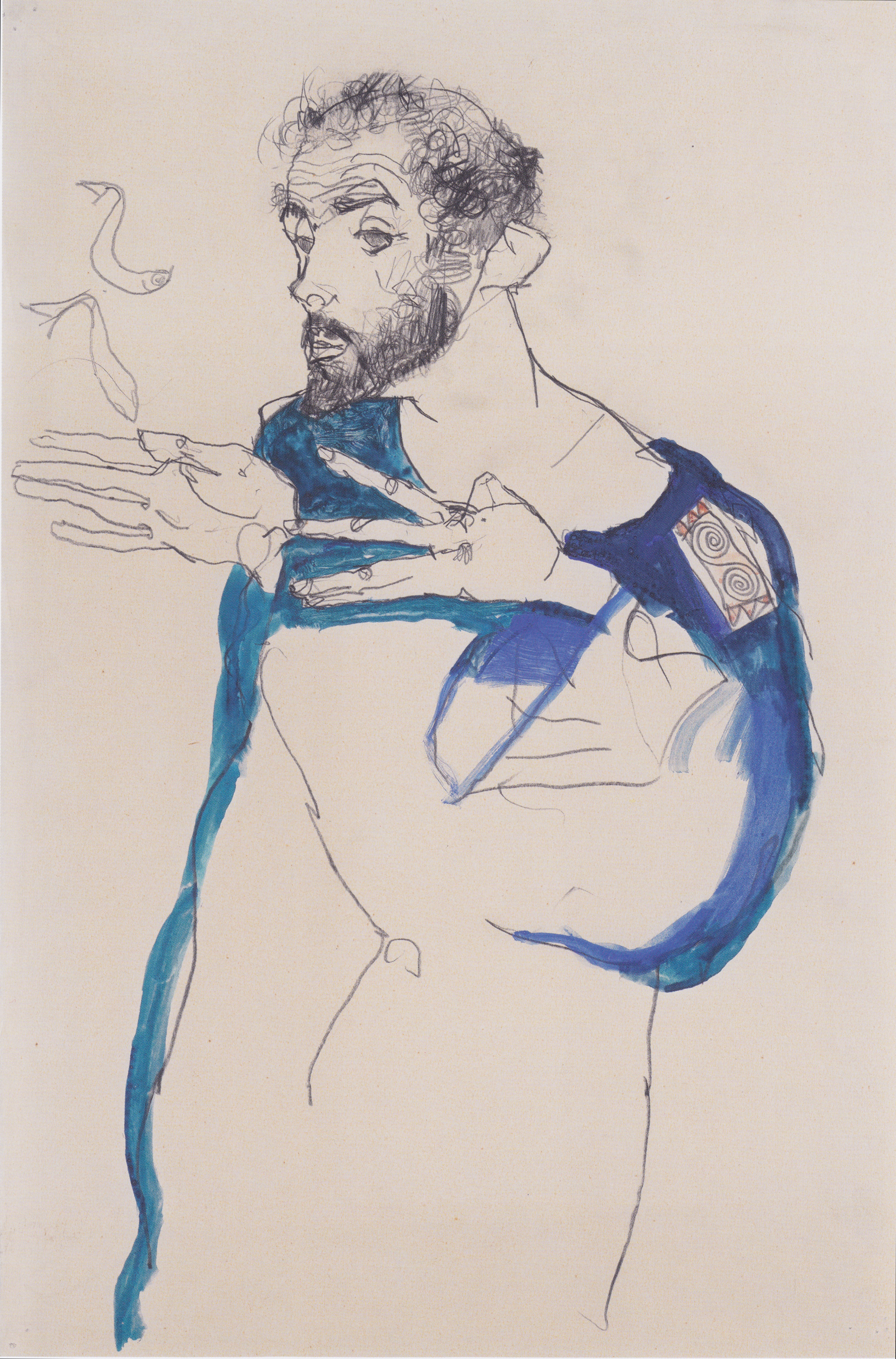
Gustav Klimt in a blue painter's smock, drawing by Egon Schiele (1913)

Building research by Helmut and Heide Buschhausen, Mario Schwarz and Gerhard Weißenbacher has proven that Gustav Klimt's last atelier (studio), used from 1911/1912 to 1918, was incorporated as the ground floor of the present two-storey building at the address Feldmühlgasse 11 (formerly Feldmühlgasse 9 and Wittegasse 15).

In the summer of 1998, further research by Herbert Rasinger and Gerhard Weissenbacher conclusive proof is provided. A considerable part of the controversy over the sale and demolition or preservation of the building, which lasted for more than ten years, revolved around this long-disputed fact.

According to the current state of research, it seems likely that the painter Felix Albrecht Harta, who was a friend of Klimt and also of the family who owned the property, the furniture manufacturer Josef Hermann, recommended that he rent the simple one-storey country house with high windows (according to Arthur Roessler) as a studio. Klimt wrote on 26 August 1911 to the editor of the address book publisher Lehmann: "My present address is 'Gustav Klimt, painter, XIIIth, Feldmühlgasse 9, no longer VIII Josefstädterstr. 21'." Previously, his studio was located in the garden pavilion of the house at Josefstädter Strasse 21 in Josefstadt from 1892 to 1911.

In November 1912, Klimt's fellow painter Egon Schiele, whom he helped as a fatherly friend, rented a studio at 101 Hietzinger Hauptstraße, just four blocks from Klimt's house. In Lehmann's Allgemeiner Wohnungs-Anzeiger Klimt was listed only with the address Feldmühlgasse (then with house number 9) from 1912 to 1915. After the death of his mother Anna, he appeared in the Lehmann from 1916 onwards at her last residential address Westbahnstraße 36 in Vienna Neubau.

Klimt's catalogue raisonné contains about twelve pictures which, if not active in summer at Attersee, he is likely to have painted in the Feldmühlgasse house. Among others, the painting Litzlberg am Attersee (1914), which was sold at an auction in New York in November 2011 for 40.4 million dollars (29.5 million euros), was painted here after his return from a summer retreat at the lake.

=== Expansion into a villa ===
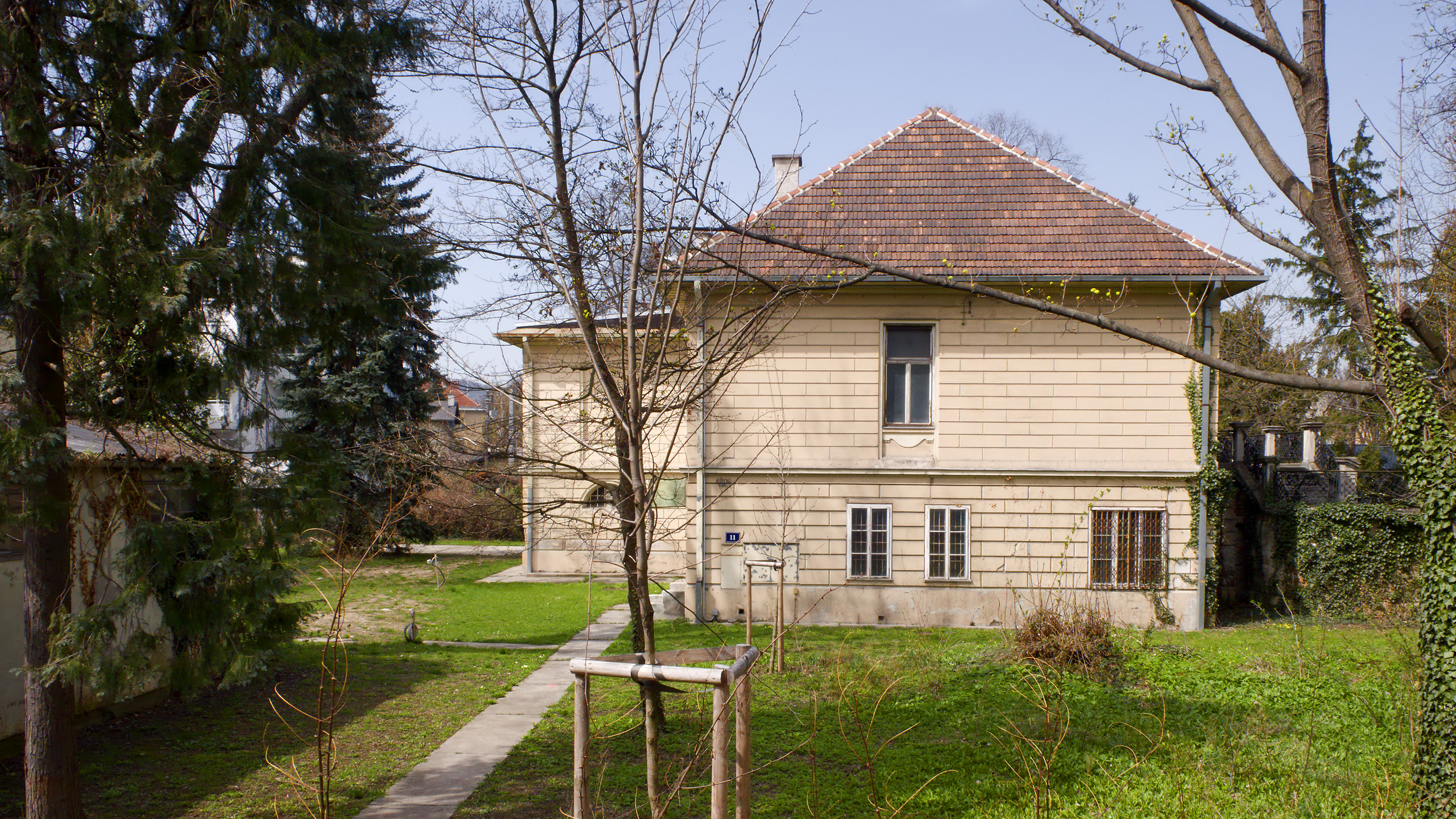
Side view of the "Klimt Villa" as seen from Feldmühlgasse, before the alterations to the roof (2010)

In 1922, the culturally interested Hermann family (involved, among other things, with Harta in the founding process of the Salzburg Festival) began building a villa around the preserved walls of Klimt's last place of work, but apparently had to interrupt it for economic reasons. After the death of Josef Hermann, the building was sold as a shell by the now sole owner and widow Helene Hermann in 1922.

The purchaser was Ernestine Werner, who soon married the wine wholesaler Felix Klein, becoming known as Ernestine Klein. She had the villa completed as a two-storey neo-baroque building with a flight of steps in the "Rosenkavalier style", which was widespread among the K.u.k.-nostalgic (especially Jewish) upper middle classes at the time. Felix Klein was listed in Lehmann's Vienna address book in 1928 for the first time, and in 1939 for the last time, with the address Feldmühlgasse 11. (An account by contemporary witness Edith Crossman, née Werner, provides information about the cultivated life in this ambience).

=== State property ===
When Austria merged with Nazi Germany in 1938, the Jewish Klein family was a target of persecution. The villa was Aryanized in 1939, that is forcibly sold to non-Jewish owners, and the Kleins fled to London. After the war, the Austrian state restituted the property to the Kleins, in 1948. The house was in poor condition, and in 1954 the Kleins sold it for 500,000 shillings to the Republic of Austria, which used the building for school purposes and added modern, ground-level buildings in the surrounding area. Shortly before 2000, a citizens' initiative turned against the sale of the building by the federal authorities, mainly for financial reasons, and constituted itself in January 1999 as the Verein Gedenkstätte Gustav Klimt and demanded the preservation of the parts of the building with the studio and its extensive garden. The association received the villa from the state in 2002–2007 as a precarium contract (Bittleihe) and appeared in public with various cultural events.

=== Controversy ===
In 2007, the Österreichische Galerie Belvedere under its new director Agnes Husslein took over the area for museum use at the invitation of the Wirtschaftsministerium, but refrained from taking care of the villa in 2008, as its plans to return it to the state of construction during Klimt's lifetime were not accepted.

The circles active in the matter of the "Klimt Villa" have always striven to save the building and its park, whereby the existing building status, at best restored to the condition of 1923 without the hipped roof added in 1958, was to be respected. Husslein, on the other hand, planned to restore the building to its condition at the time of Klimt and to remove the components of the neo-baroque villa building. Against this, it was argued that lack of documentation would prevent restoration of the building's design to that of Klimt's lifetime. In addition, the largely preserved villa represented an essential and hitherto disregarded cultural achievement of the Viennese Jewish bourgeoisie.

The public debate in 2007 about the possible demolition of the villa building and the excavation of the remains of Klimt's studio became more heated again at the end of the year due to a report about "secret" demolition plans. In March 2008, the decision of the Ministry of Economics against the Belvedere's preferred project and in favour of the preservation of the villa and its careful restoration to the state of construction at the time of its erection in 1923 with a flat roof was ultimately based on considerations of monument protection.

=== Since 2012 ===
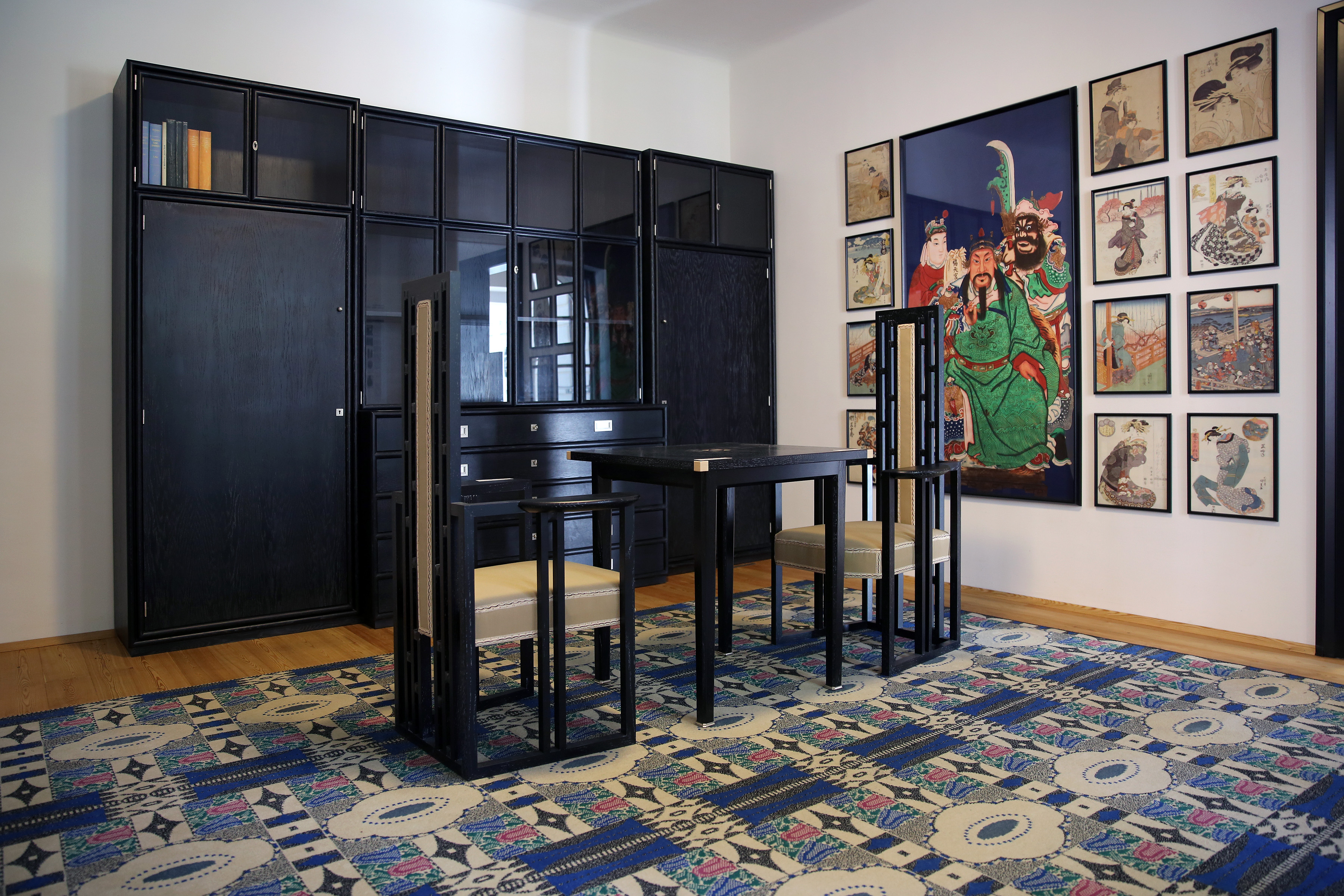
The reconstructed reception room (2013)

In 2008, the Ministry of Economy transferred the fruitful enjoyment of the property to the Kuratorium für künstlerische und heilende Pädagogik (Comenius Institute, President Elisabeth Rössel-Majdan) with the condition that the former Gustav Klimt studio rooms be made accessible to the public as a memorial.

The Burghauptmannschaft Österreich renovated two outbuildings according to the needs of the new users. In 2009, the Comenius Institute opened a workshop for the disabled, and in the same year the villa was listed as a historic monument. In 2010, the new users presented a concept for the operation of the Klimt memorial and estimated the necessary budget at 1.8 million euros. The renovation work began in spring 2011 and the rooms were presented to the public on 30 September 2012.

On the ground floor, the rooms were renovated and designed in such a way that visitors get an impression of the conditions at the time of Klimt's use. The reconstruction of the furnishings was based on photographs by Moriz Nähr from 1918, descriptions handed down by Egon Schiele and Kijiro Ohta, and existing original samples of objects. In the front area is the reception room with furnishings based on designs by Josef Hoffmann, which were originally produced by the Wiener Werkstätte (reconstruction of table and chairs: HTL Mödling, carpet: Joh. Backhausen & Söhne).

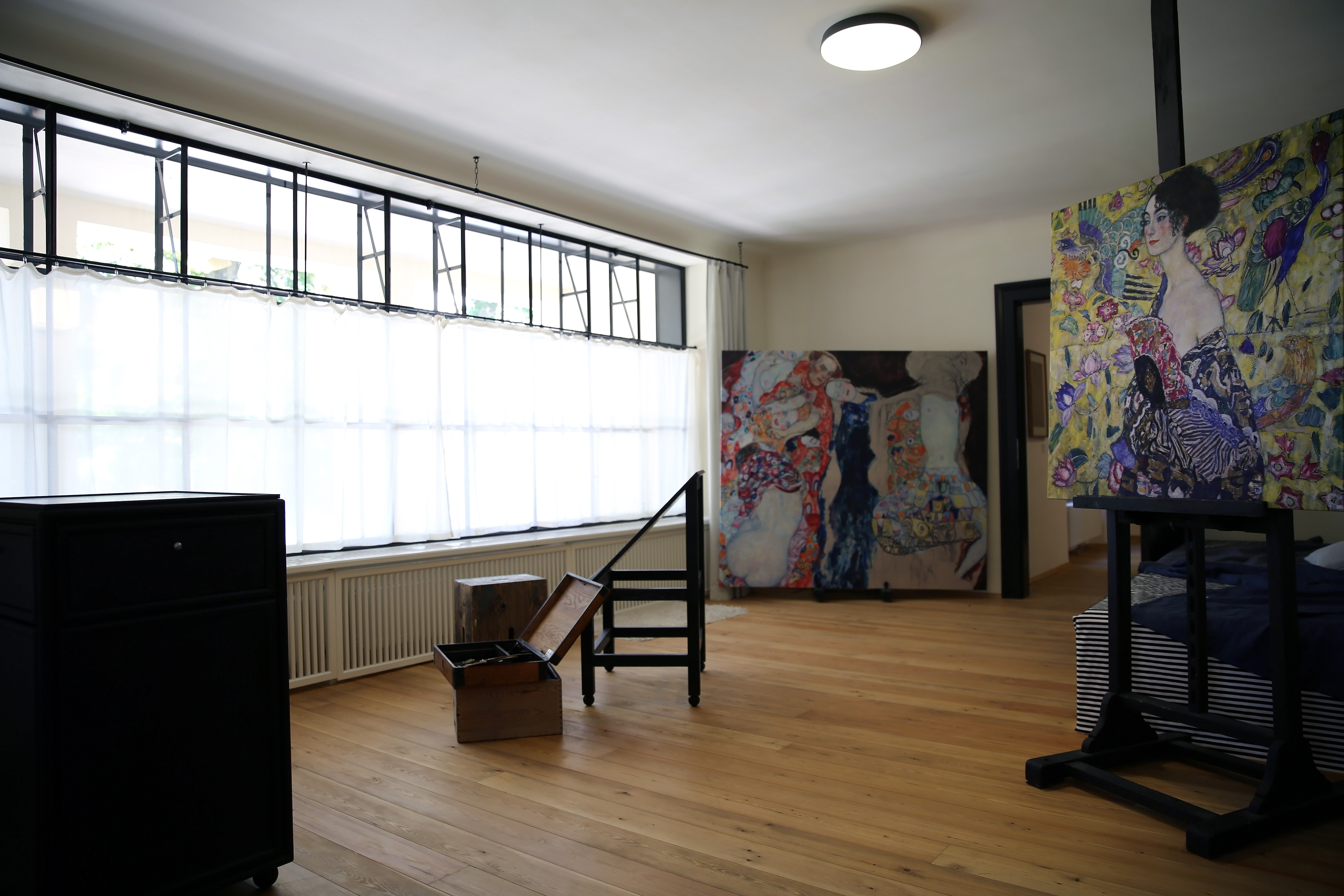
Klimt's reconstructed studio (2013)

In addition to four smaller rooms, where information panels, exhibits and several drawings by Klimt explain these years of his life, especially his models and relationships, the reconstructed studio on the north side forms the centre of the exhibition. As seen in a photograph by Nähr, reproductions of the paintings Lady with Fan (1917/18) and The Bride (1917/18, unfinished) are also displayed here on easels.

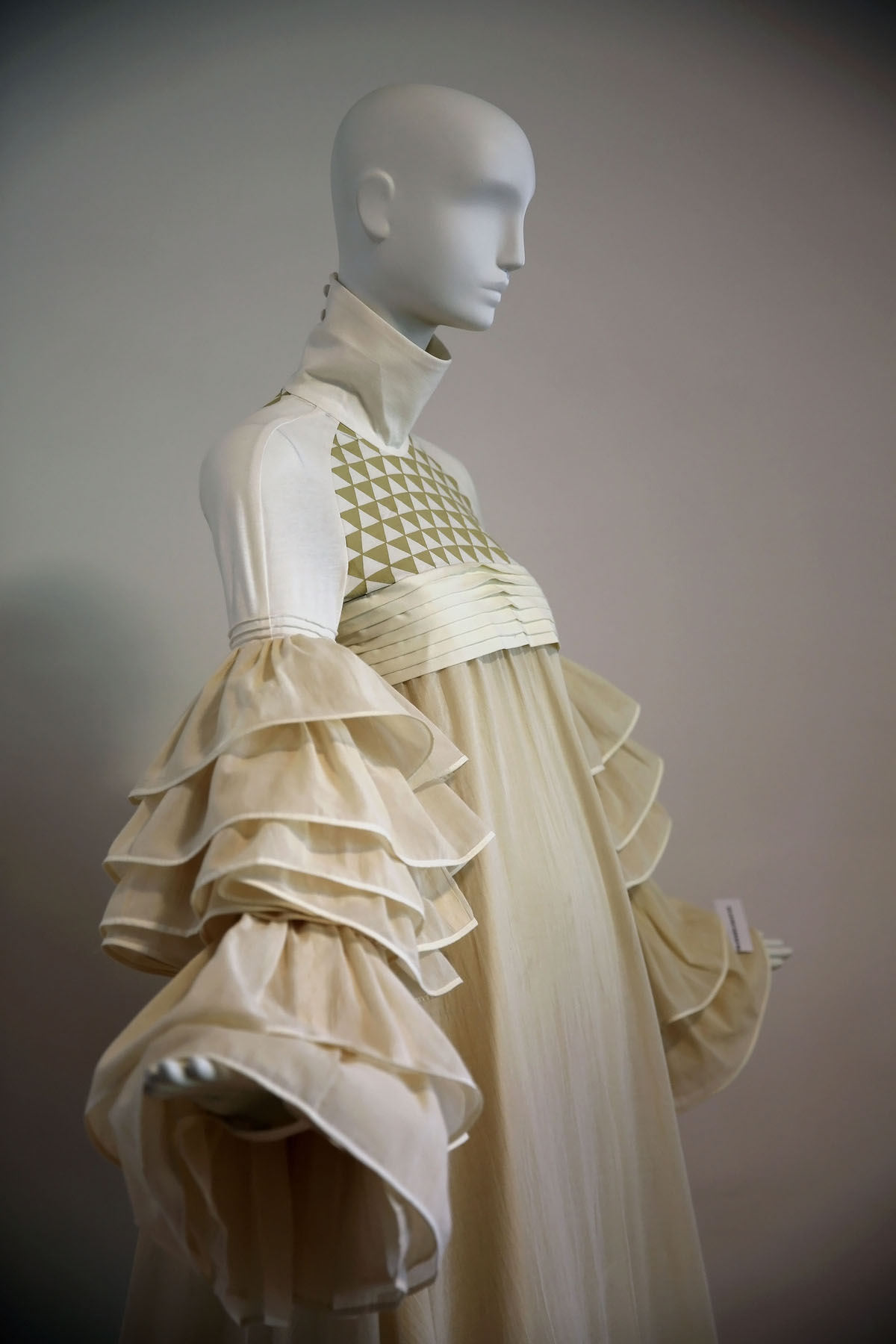
Dress according to the design of the Flöge sisters' salon

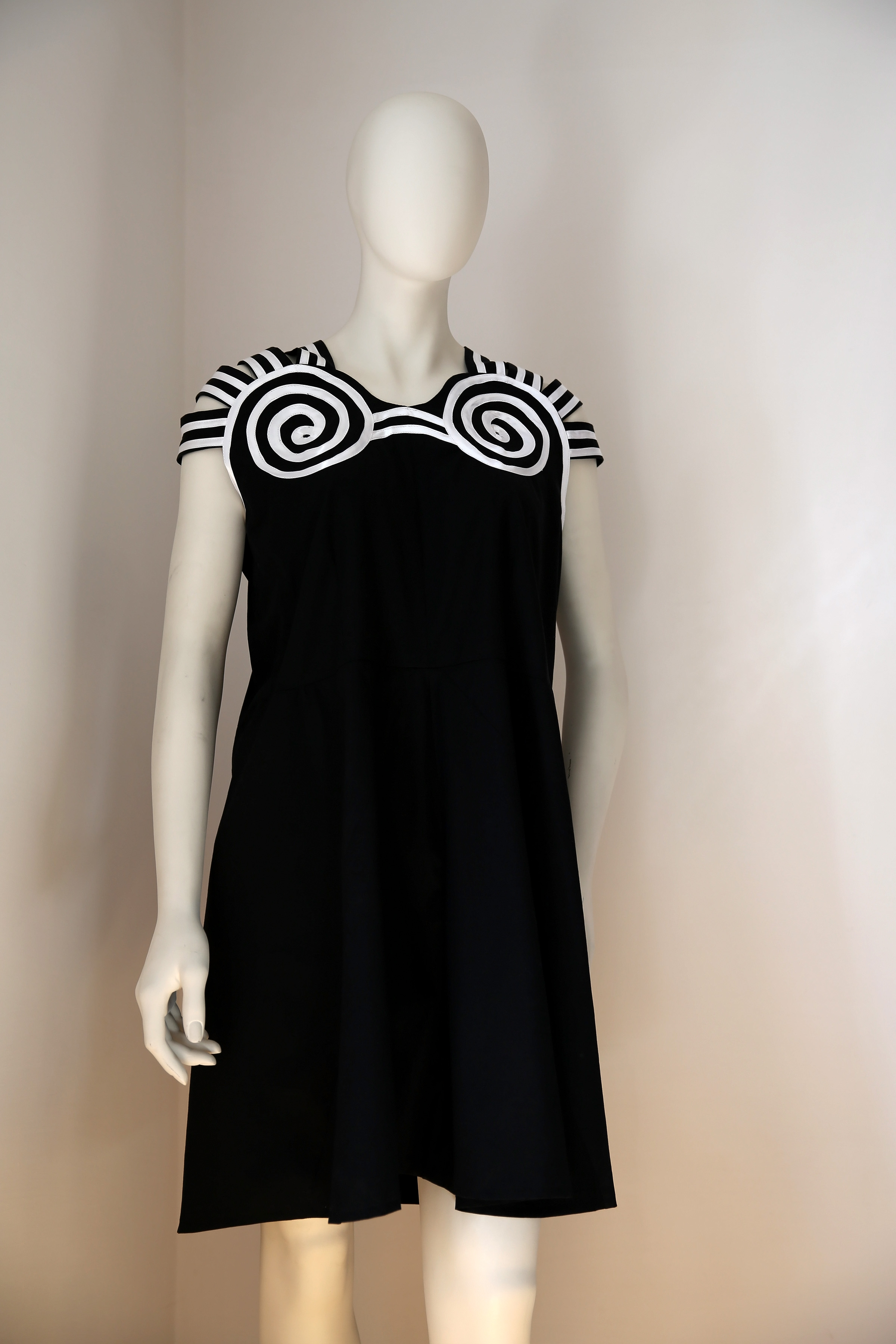
Emilie Flöge's Bathing Dress

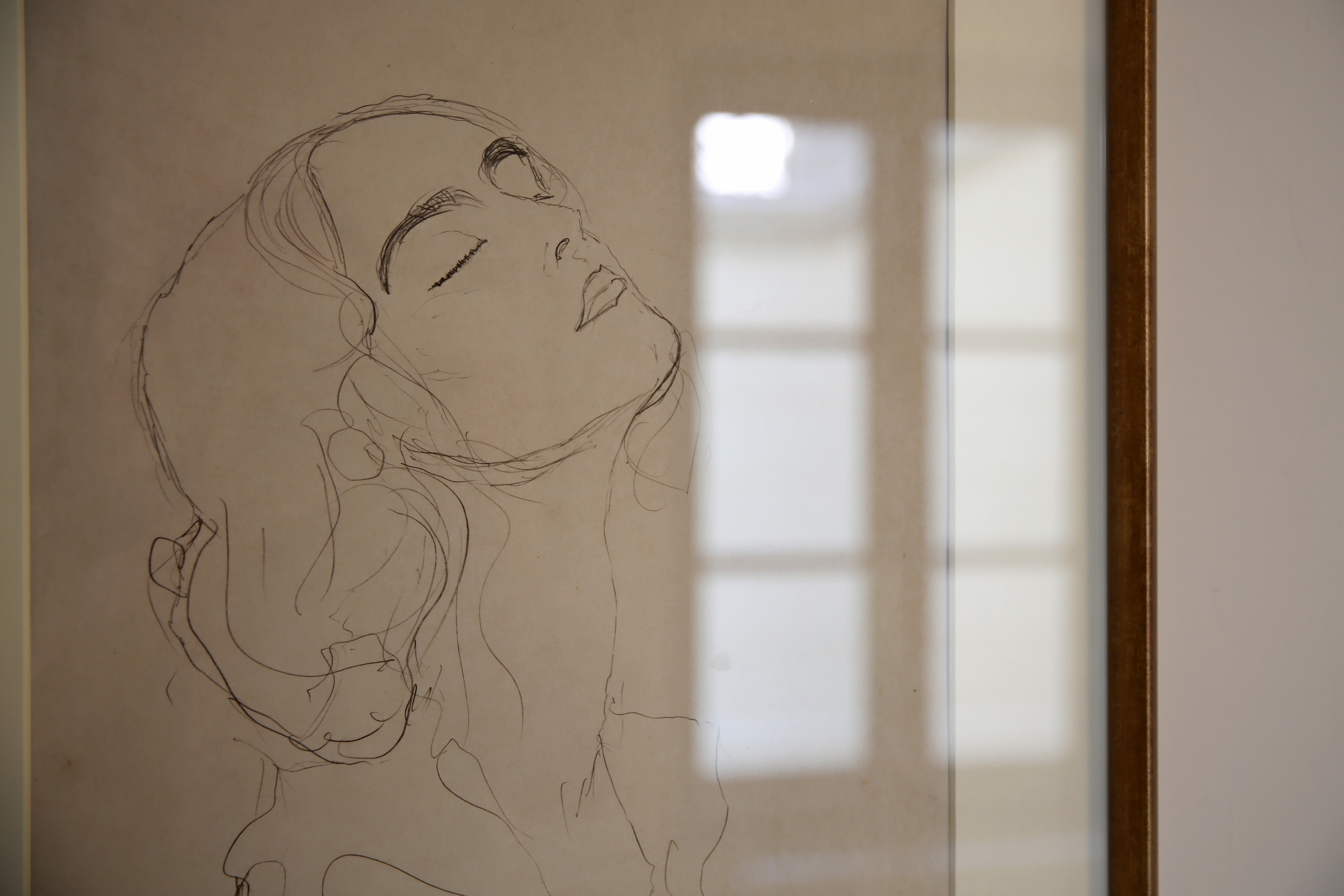
Gustav Klimt: Mädchenkopf mit geschlossenen Augen (1913)

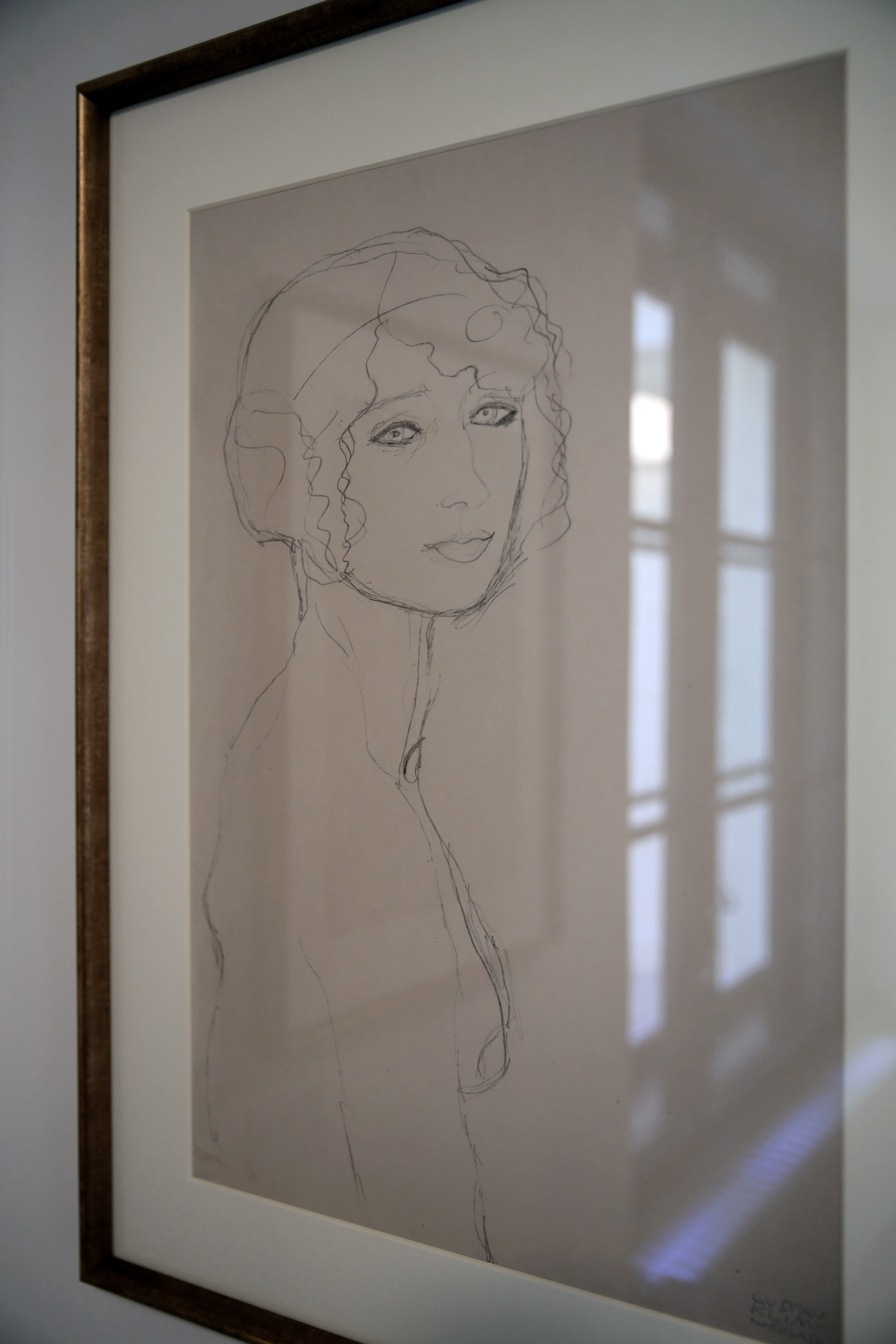
Gustav Klimt: Brustbild eines Frauenaktes (ca 1916)

== See also ==
- List of single-artist museums
