= Villa Skywa-Primavesi =

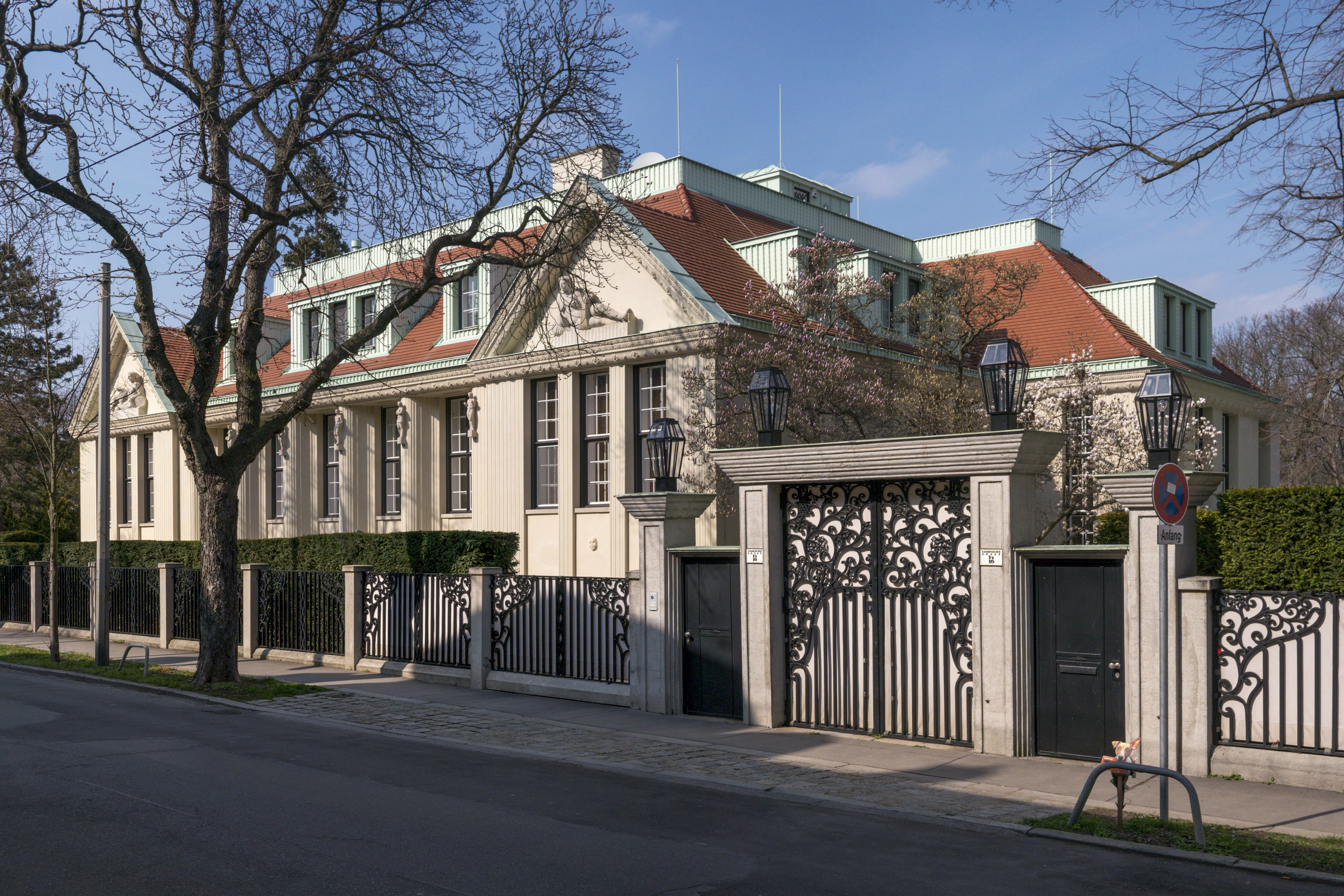
Villa Primavesi in Vienna

The Villa Primavesi (also: Villa Skywa-Primavesi) at Gloriettegasse 14–16 in Vienna-Hietzing is one of the most famous buildings by the Austrian architect Josef Hoffmann.

The villa should not be confused with the Villa Primavesi in Olomouc (Olmütz)[1].

== Description ==
The building was constructed between 1913 and 1915 for Robert Primavesi, an industrialist, landowner, and member of the Imperial Council, who was born in Olomouc, and his partner, Josefine Skywa.

From 1942, the building was owned by the Nazis party; for the period from 1945–49, the Republic of Austria is listed in the land register as the owner.

After 1945, it was used as a trade union training center, and for a time, was an official residence for the Federal President. The Austrian Trade Union Federation sold the property in 2005 to the aluminum industrialist Peter König, who had the house renovated, adding an underground parking garage for his classic car collection. Plans to use the building for the Bösendorfer piano factory were abandoned due to protests from local residents.

Hoffmann's Art Nouveau garden was redesigned in 1956. It is one of the most important garden architectural monuments in Austria and is listed in the monument protection law.

== Literature ==
- H. de Fries (Hrsg.): Moderne Villen und Landhäuser, 3. Auflage, Wasmuth, Berlin 1925, S. 186–189.
- Gerhard Weissenbacher: In Hietzing gebaut, 2 Bde., Wien Holzhausen, 1996 und 1998, S. o.A.
- Gabriele Fahr-Becker: Wiener Werkstätte, 1903–1932. Taschen, Köln 2008, ISBN 978-3-8228-3771-9, S. 72–83.

== Weblinks ==
- Villa Skywa-Primavesi, hietzing.at
- Villa Primavesi. In: architektur im netz, nextroom.at.
