= Frieda Salvendy =

Austrian painter and engraver (1887–1965)

- Born: 4 January 1887; Vienna, Austria-Hungary
- Died: 1965 (aged 77–78); Malvern, England
- Known for: Painting

Frieda Salvendy (4 January 1887 – 1965) was a Jewish Austrian painter, engraver, feminist and Holocaust refugee.

== Biography ==
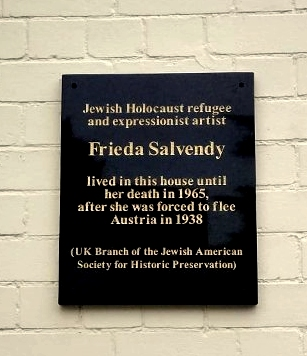
Plaque to Salvendy, Worcestershire

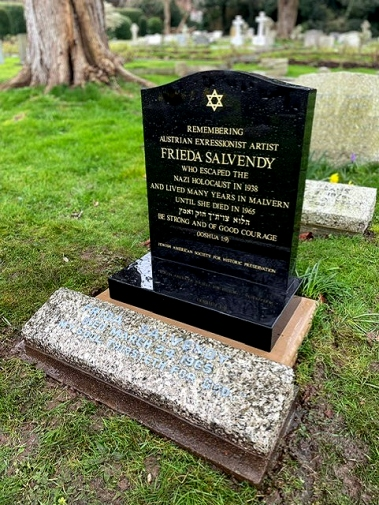
Salvendy tombstone

Salvendy was born in Vienna, Austria-Hungary. She studied under Albin Egger-Lienz and Felix Albrecht Harta. She was known for her landscapes and figure painting, as well as her lithography. Like many of her contemporaries she shunned the more decorative approach of Art Nouveau and saw painting as a means of spiritual expression. She exhibited with the Vereinigung bildender Künstlerinnen Österreichs (VBKÖ) and the Wiener Frauenkunst. She was a member of the Austrian artists' group Hagenbund, a prestigious group of Austrian artists which allowed her to mix with others who embraced the newer schools of Expressionism and New Objectivity. Her works were exhibited in Stockholm, Prague and Vienna.

Salvendy traveled abroad quite extensively in the pre-war years and, in the 1930s, paid a lengthy visit to Cornwall, where she befriended the Adams family who were also artists and musicians. Salvendy returned to Prague in 1938 to stay with her ailing mother and was still in Prague when Hitler's forces moved into the city. Salvendy escaped to England, seeking refuge in Cornwall, from where she was able to organize numerous exhibitions of her work around England. Many of her works dated to her earlier period so she had been able to arrange for their safe passage at some point. There is a suggestion that she may have been interred on the Isle of Man as an 'enemy alien' but if so it could not have been for long, as she appeared in the 1939 Register living in Mousehole, Cornwall, and was holding an exhibition of her work in Bradford as early as May 1940. Exhibitions followed in Newlyn, Newcastle and Middlesbrough (1940), Leicester and Reading (1941), and Manchester (1942). Others took place in 1944 in Newcastle, Shipley, and Cheltenham, with 50 paintings being presented at the latter venue. These occasions were used by Salvendy to promote the plight of Czechoslovaks living under Nazi rule.

The London Gazette edition for November 1947 listed Salvendy as one of the 'aliens' who had been granted Certificates of Naturalisation, with her address being given as Maldron in Cornwall. Her closest friend, Ruth Adams, tragically lost her life on a cliff fall. Salvendy eventually settled in Malvern, Worcestershire where she died in 1965. She lived in an apartment in a house in Malvern Link and had a small group of close friends. Her death was announced in the local newspaper: 'Salvendy (Frida) - on March 24, 1965, at Malvern, great painter, grand friend'. The notice was placed by her companion, Anna Grace Adams, Salvendy's friend from Cornwall who had moved to Malvern in the mid-1930s. Salvendy spent her last days in Court House nursing home in Malvern. Her ashes were interred at Malvern Wells cemetery, and a simple stone memorial includes scripture from Psalm 63 - 'My soul thirsts for God. She shares the plot with Adams, who died in 1976 and two other local women.

There has been a renewed interest in Frieda Salvendy and her contribution to the art world. Some of her work was featured in the Jewish Museum Vienna in 2017 as part of an exhibition entitled, ‘The Better Half – Jewish Women Artists Before 1938’. Her work was included in the 2019 exhibition City Of Women: Female Artists in Vienna from 1900 to 1938 at the Österreichische Galerie Belvedere. In 2020 the Ben Uri Research Unit in London published Czech Routes to Britain in which Frieda Salvendy is given prominence. She exhibited with Ben Uri in 1945 and 1946, and the book explains how “her reputation is currently undergoing a reassessment.”

In December 2021, a plaque was installed on the outer wall of the care home where she died, in Court Road, Malvern, Worcestershire, by Martin Sugarman of the Jewish American Society for Historic Preservation U.K. Branch and others. Additionally, a "Remembering Stone" was placed over her forgotten gravesite in the Malvern Cemetery.

Some sources cite her birthplace as Nové Mesto nad Váhom in modern-day Slovakia.
