= Ernestine Klein =

Ernestine Klein (1887 - 1973 née Kreisler) was an Austrian Jewish art collector whose art collection was looted by the Nazis.

== Personal life ==
Klein was born on 24 February 1887 in Vienna into a Jewish family. She married Hugo Werner with whom she had a daughter, Edith Werner (later Edith Crossmann), in 1908. Later she married Felix Klein, a wine wholesaler. They owned businesses and property in Vienna and Budapest.

== Art collection and patronage ==
Close to Gustav Klimt, after Klimt's death in 1918 the Klein couple converted the artist’s former studio into a villa which later became known as the Villa Klimt.

Artworks in Klein's collection included Egon Schiele's Portrait of Gerti Schiele, now at the MoMa, and Klimt’s Portrait of Prince William Nii Nortey Dowuona . Klein had loaned Klimt's portrait of the Prince in 1928 at a memorial exhibition for the artist at the Vienna Secession. After it was looted by the Nazis it disappeared, until it suddenly resurfaced in 2023 offered for sale at the TEFAF to the astonishment of art professionals. How it came there from Austria and Hungary was the object of a highly publicized criminal investigation.

== Persecution by Nazis, loss and exile ==
After the Anschluss of Austria with Nazi Germany in 1938, the couple as persecuted due to their Jewish heritage and in 1939 their property in Vienna was Aryanized (forcibly transferred to non Jews). The Kleins fled Austria and survived in hiding in Monaco.

== Postwar life ==
After the defeat of the Nazis, Ernestine returned to find their valuable art collection had been looted. They tried unsuccessfully to find it. They also attempted to recover their home, the Klimt Villa.

== Restitution claims ==
Klimt Villa was restituted to Klein who sold it back to the Austrian authorities in 1957.

Before fleeing, Klein entrusted a friend with safekeeping Klimt’s Portrait of Prince William Nii Nortey Dowuona but instead of returning the painting the friend sold it and its whereabouts were unknown until it appeared at the Wienerroither & Kohlbacher Gallery at TEFAF "following a restitution settlement with Ernestine Klein’s heirs".

== See also ==
- List of claims for restitution for Nazi-looted art
- The Holocaust in Austria
