= Baillo =

Baillo is a Spanish surname. Notable people with the surname include:

- Jorge Gómez Baillo (born 1959), Argentine chess master
- José Antonio Sánchez Baíllo (born 1953), Spanish painter and engraver
