= Baillou =

- Commune
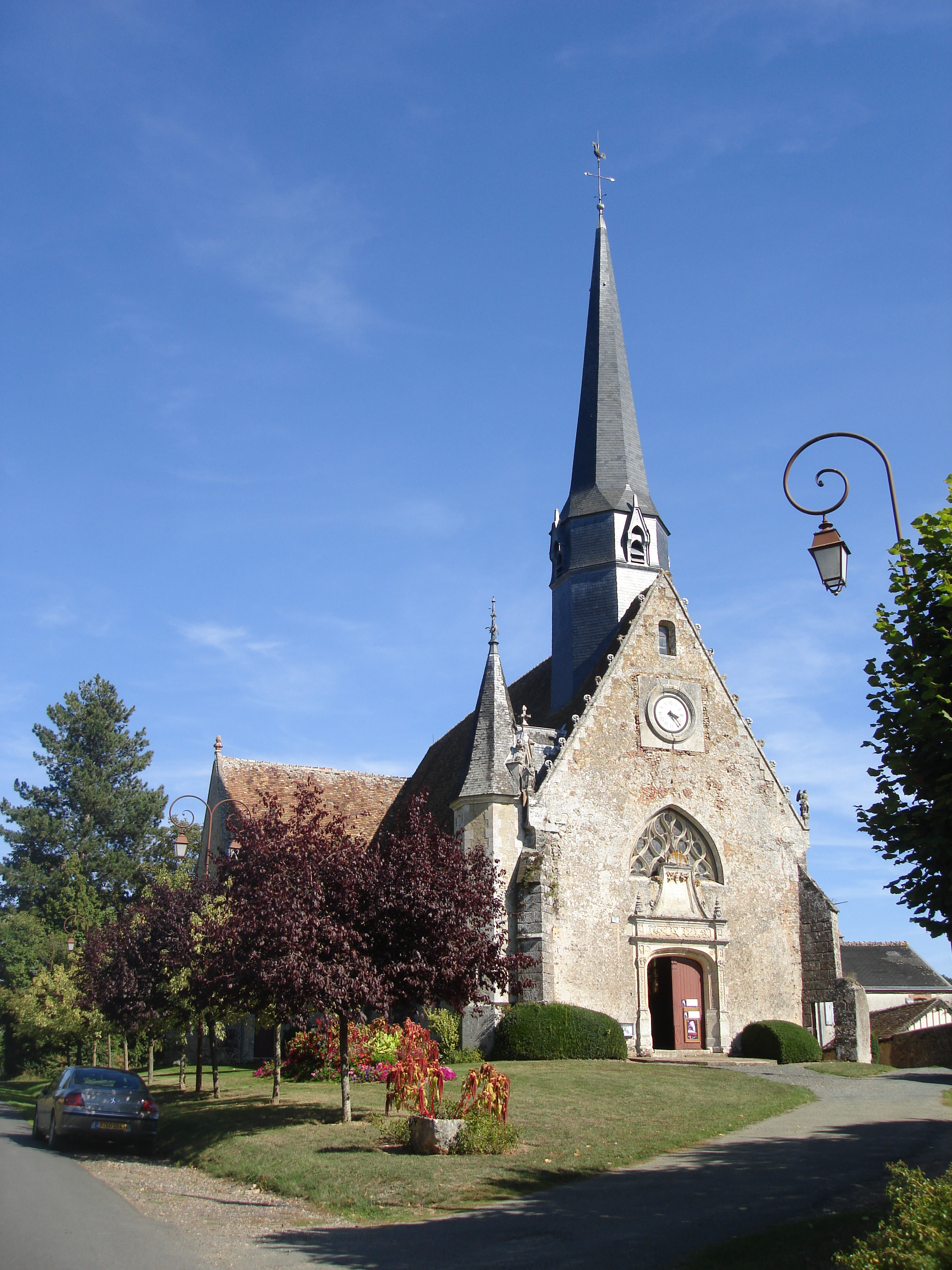
- Church of Saint-Jean-Baptiste

- Coat of arms
- Location of Baillou
- Location within France Location within Centre-Val de Loire
- Coordinates: 47°58′08″N 0°50′35″E
- Country: France
- Region: Centre-Val de Loire
- Department: Loir-et-Cher
- Arrondissement: Vendôme
- Canton: Le Perche
- Intercommunality: Collines du Perche

Government
  - Mayor (2020–2026): Jean-Luc Pelletier
- Area^{1}: 19.85 km^{2} (7.66 sq mi)
- Elevation: 152 m (499 ft)
- Highest elevation: 166 m (545 ft)
- Lowest elevation: 88 m (289 ft)
- Population (2023): 210
  - Density: 11/km^{2} (27/sq mi)
- Time zone: UTC+01:00 (CET)
  - Summer (DST): UTC+02:00 (CEST)
- INSEE/Postal code: 41012 /41170
- ^{1} French Land Register data, which excludes lakes, ponds, glaciers > 1 km^{2} (0.386 sq mi or 247 acres) and river estuaries.

Baillou (French pronunciation: [baju]) is a commune in the Loir-et-Cher department in central France. Notable buildings are the church of Saint-Jean-Baptiste and the Château de Baillou whose vast property spans most of the region.

The history of Baillou is inherently linked to the Baillou family, one of the oldest aristocratic families and landowners in Europe.

== Population ==
Historical population
Year	Pop.	±% p.a.
1968	354	—
1975	276	−3.49%
1982	250	−1.40%
1990	230	−1.04%
1999	229	−0.05%
2007	246	+0.90%
2012	249	+0.24%
2017	226	−1.92%
2023	210	−1.22%
Source: INSEE

== See also ==
- Communes of the Loir-et-Cher department
- Baillo
