= Felix Albrecht Harta =

Austrian Expressionist painter

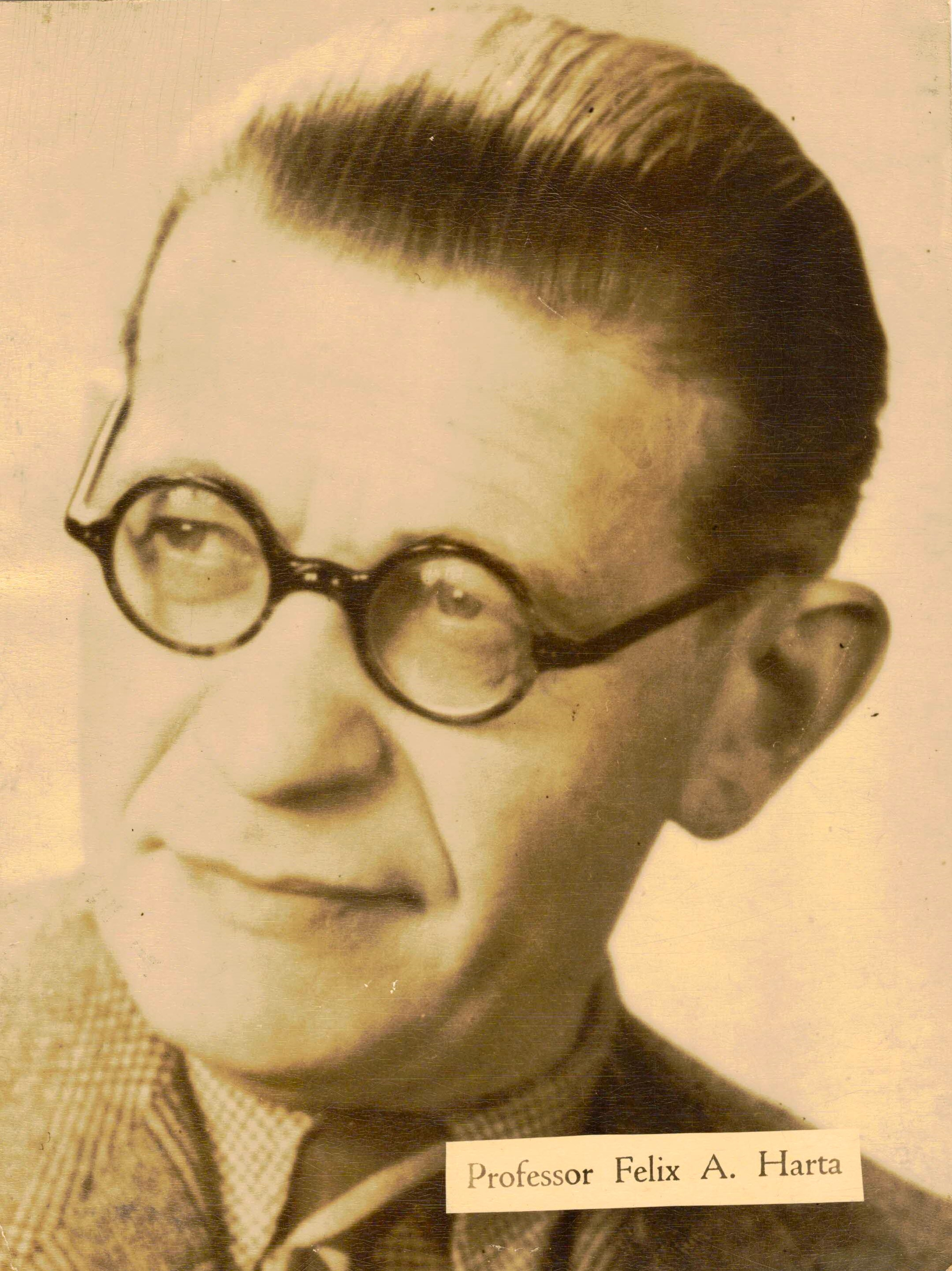
- Born: July 2, 1884; Budapest, Hungary
- Died: November 27, 1967 (aged 83); Salzburg, Austria
- Style: Expressionism, Impressionism, Classicism
- Movement: Austrian Expressionist

Felix Albrecht Harta (né Hirsch; 1884–1967) was an Austrian expressionist painter, graphic artist, organizer, and teacher whose oeuvre consisted of portraits, nudes, landscapes, and still-lives, working in varied media.

== Early life (1884–1905) ==
Felix Albrecht Harta was born Felix Albert Hirsch in Budapest on July 2, 1884, the son of a wealthy merchant, Moritz Hirsch, and his wife Theresia (née Jonas). When Harta was three years old, his father moved the family to Vienna, and Felix spent his childhood with his brother, Ernst, and sister, Alice. Both brothers later changed their surnames: Felix to Harta, and Ernst to Reinhold. Harta's desire to be a painter clashed with his father's insistence that he should study architecture, so he spent four and a half years at the Technische Hochschule in Vienna. In the winter of 1905, Harta passed the entrance exam at the Academy München and was admitted to the painting class of Prof Hugo von Habermann. At the academy, he became friends with future notable painters like Hans Eder, Jules Pascin, and Julius Schülein.

== Early period (1908–1918) ==
In 1908, Harta embarked on study trips, first to Paris, France, where he studied the old masters such as Titian and Tintoretto. There he became captivated by the Impressionists like Cezanne, Manet, Renoir, Courbet, and Van Gogh. He exhibited for the first time at the Vienna Künstlerhaus and in the fall at the Salon D’ Automne in Paris. From Paris, he undertook a three-month study trip to Spain and immersed himself in the painting style of masters like Velasquez, El Greco, and Goya.

In 1909, Harta fell in with a group of young painters that included Egon Schiele, Anton Faistauer, Oskar Kokoschka, Paris von Gütersloh, and Anton Kolig. Around this time, Harta also developed a friendship with Austria’s leading painter, Gustav Klimt.

In 1910–1911, Harta spent much time in the old city of Bruges. Several paintings created there were exhibited in the 38th Exhibition of the Vienna Secession.

In the spring of 1911, Harta met Elisabeth Hermann (nicknamed Elly). Elly is the daughter of the Hermanns, an industrialist family who lived in Hietzing, Vienna, and owned a residential house as well as a small Biedermeier-style cottage with a large garden. At the recommendation of Harta and Elly, they rented the cottage to Gustav Klimt in 1911. This property would become known as "Klimt’s Last Atelier"- usually termed "Klimt Villa" – at Feldműhlgasse 11 in the Hietzing district.

In 1913, Harta exhibited in the 43rd exhibition of the Vienna Secession, and in March in the Exhibition of the Bund Österreichischer Künstler and the Collected Works Gustav Klimt at the Művészház in Budapest. That summer, he traveled to Paris with his friend, the painter, Albert Paris von Gütersloh. In Paris, Harta became acquainted with Futurist painters like Marinetti, Boccioni, and Severini. He visited the painters such as Maurice Utrillo and his mother, Suzanne Valadon, and also met Auguste Rodin and the poet Rainer Maria Rilke. In November and December, along with Erwin Lang and Bertold Löffler, they organized The International Black and White Exhibition in Vienna. In the exhibition catalog, Gütersloh wrote an essay on Harta’s “Street Scene from Montparnasse”. He wrote how Harta excluded everything that could evoke ideas from the beholder, and in great detail explained how the drawing evokes imaginative movement, and how Harta's drawings are "physiognomy".

On April 22, 1914, Harta married Elisabeth in Vienna and their first child, Eva Maria, was born on December 31. Eva Harta would grow up to be a successful commercial artist in her own right. An interesting story is that Harta visited Egon Schiele's studio, and Schiele drew a sketch of baby Eva, that unfortunately is lost.

In January 1916, Harta showed 9 oil paintings and 22 drawings in the Berlin Secession Exhibition along with such notables as Schiele, Klimt, Kokoschka and Kolomon Moser .

Harta was drafted and entered into military service on November 6, 1916. He first served as a volunteer for one year with the Imperial-Royal (k.u.k.), Train Replacement Division No, 16 in Mostar. He was unhappy about being in an infantry division, so he wrote to Klimt who approved his request to be assigned to the War Press Quarters, as a war painter. During this time, he drew and painted numerous portraits of pilots, especially of the 6th, 10th, and 11th Army. He also drew airfields, peasant scenes, and landscapes in the Italian theater of the war and Eastern Galicia. Harta also exhibited in War Exhibitions in Vienna from 1917-18.

== Inter-war period (1918–1938) ==
In March 1918, Harta rejoined his family, who had moved to Salzburg. There he began to cultivate relationships with people such as the writers, Stefan Zweig, Hugo von Hofmannsthal, Oskar A. H. Schmitz, Hermann Bahr, the theater director, Max Reinhardt, the painter, Alfred Kubin, the Mozarteum director, Bernhard Paumgartner, and the hotelier and writer, Alois Grasmayr. They met regularly at the Café Bazar and the Hotel Bristol and were frustrated at the collapse of the Austrian-Hungarian monarchy, while being united in their desire to create a new artistic vision for Austria. Harta strongly advocated for the idea of an artistic association in Salzburg:

"Salzburg had turned from a sleepy town into a culture center. Out of the dislocation of the disintegration of the monarchy arose in all of us the common wish of creating a new Austria of the muses out of the left-over pieces, which was the birth of an artist's union."

— Felix A. Harta, Christa Svoboda "Zur Geschichte des Salzburger Kunstvereins, ", p. 39.

He already had cultivated such societies in Munich, Paris, and Vienna. He carried on a robust letter exchange with his friend, and artist-colleague, Anton Faistauer, who argued against founding a new artistic association. Harta however persists, and a letter from Faistauer dated Jan. 9th 1919 confirms that the initiative to found the new artistic association derives from Harta. The new rebellious association was called “Der Wassermann” (Aquarius in English), and Harta was named President and is listed as a founding member. The first “Wassermann” exhibit opened on August 3, 1919, with Harta featuring ten oils; other notable participants were A.P. Gutersloh, Faistauer, Oskar A.Vonwiller, Anton Kolig, Robin C. Andersen, Alfred Kubin, Broncia Koller-Pinell, Franz Wiegele, and Egon Schiele (posthumously). The exhibit not only focused on painting, but included sub-divisions for graphics, music, and literature. The first exhibition was a success judging by attendance and setting a record. However, critics were polarized with some being very positive, and others negative. Today it is recognized that “Der Wassermann” introduced modern art to Salzburg, and contributed greatly to its cultural development. Two additional exhibitions took place in 1920 and 1921. Harta and Faistauer also arranged for a monument to the Austrian painter, Hans Makart at his birthplace in Salzburg. Finally, both worked to establish a modern painting academy in Salzburg but the lack of financial support from the city and state brought a swift end to this groundbreaking idea.

In 1920, Harta arranged for permanent exhibition space in the Neue Galerie in what today is Salzburg's Alter Markt (old market). Many of Austria's most prominent artists showed their oils and graphics including Faistauer, Harta, Kokoschka, and Klimt and Schiele(posthumously).

On March 24, 1921, Harta was baptized into the Catholic faith, with the critic, playwright, and scholar, Hermann Bahr serving as his Godfather. Harta and his wife celebrated the birth of their second child, Klaudius (Claude) on October 29, 1921.

In 1922, Harta and Faistauer proposed setting up a new gallery of old masters that became the Residenzgalerie in Salzburg.

In early 1924, Harta returned to Vienna, and in March he exhibited twenty-four oil paintings and thirty-seven graphics in the Künstlerhaus of the Cooperative of Fine Artists in Vienna. At the same time, he became a member of the Hagenbund. Harta participated in many of their exhibitions and served on many of the executive and hanging committees. In June 1928, the Hagenbund presented a themed show on the 'Family', including a collection of 36 oil paintings by Harta that received favorable reviews. He designed the posters for the 1931 European Plastik Exhibition and the 58th and 66th Hagenbund Exhibitions. From 1929–31, he served as the Secretary, and functioned as the Vice President in 1932 and 1933. This period is also filled with many exhibitions throughout Europe. Recent research into the Hagenbund Network shows that Harta was one of only twelve artists that most often exhibited in the Hagenbund between 1930 and 1938.

Harta was also a driving force in support of leading Austrian Expressionist Dancers. In January 1933, he shows numerous watercolors at the International Graphics Exhibition, "The Dance, Gothic to the Present". In 1934, he served on The Prominent Jury of the International Dance Competition and Folk Dance, Vienna. Despite the German occupation in 1938, Harta allows the well-known expressionist dancer, Hilde Holger to have dance lessons and secret performances in his studio.

During 1926 and 1927, he returned to Paris and Southern France. He exhibited at the Salon d’Automne, Paris, The Salon du Franc, the Café du Dome, and L’Exposition Internationale des Beaux, where he receives the Diplôme d’Honneur, Bourdeaux. In 1929, he received the Austrian state prize for his poster of the Vienna Festival Week. During this time, Harta took on pupils such as Ilse Tauber, and the artist, Frieda Salvendy. In 1927 the Hartas adopted a young woman named Gusti Wolf who would become a renowned Austrian stage, screen, and television actress. She credited being adopted by Harta as changing the trajectory of her life. Harta drew numerous portraits of her, and his most notable painting of her hangs in the foyer of the Vienna Burgtheater.

1938 was not a good year for Harta. First, there was a fire in the Neue Galerie, where many of his paintings were destroyed. Then, on March 12, 1938, the Germans occupied Austria (the Anschluss). Despite Harta’s conversion to Roman-Catholicism, he was forced to leave Vienna in June 1939, and emigrated to England, where he settled in Cambridge.

== Emigration and stay in England (1939–1950) ==
Initially, Harta's his time in England was marked by trauma and difficulty. In May 1940, he was arrested by British authorities, and taken to a concentration camp at Huyton, near Liverpool where the British determined who was a German sympathizer or spy. After three and a half months of hardship, he was released and returned to Cambridge. In the fall of 1940, his apartment in Cambridge is bombed in the German Blitz attacks. These difficult experiences are critical to understanding the direction of his stylistic development, wherein his paintings become more conservative and the expressionistic tendencies begin to diminish. It has been speculated that he was traumatized by his forced emigration, loss of wealth, and his temporary arrest, and his internment. He was also penniless and needed to earn a living by commissioned drawings of aristocrats and family portraits. Despite these challenges, he managed in 1942 to have two solo exhibitions of his drawings and watercolors organized by the architect, Professor Albert Richardson at the Heffer Gallery in Cambridge, where he received favorable reviews from the Cambridge Daily News. He also participated in the First Group Exhibition of German, Austrian, Czechoslovak Painters and Sculptors at the Wertheim Gallery in London in June 1939 and in the Foyle’s Gallery in London in 1945. He also drew and painted numerous countryside landscapes of Suffolk, Sussex, and Essex.

== Return to Salzburg and later life (1950–1967) ==
In the spring of 1950, Harta returned to Salzburg. He exhibited his English watercolors and drawings in a collective exhibition at the Salzburg Künstlerhaus, and resumed relationships with his old friends and a large circle of Salzburg celebrities. According to his personal records, he was deeply occupied with thoughts of religious content, motivated by his experiences during the war. This preoccupation with religious themes was not new, since many of his post-WWI paintings were religious in nature. In September 1954, on the occasion of Harta's 70th birthday, a collective exhibition of Harta's life work was presented at the Salzburg Künstlerhaus. In April 1955 the Staatsdruckerei Vienna opened a collective of Harta's oeuvre where he exhibited around 100 oil paintings and an approximately equal number of watercolors and drawings. In 1956, he organized the Internationale Portrait Ausstellung which took place between July 19 to August 12 in the Salzburg Künstlerhaus. Harta contacted his friends and colleagues scattered across the world for help in bringing portraits for the exhibition. Many countries and notable artists were represented, such as Albert Birkle, Albert Paris Gütersloh, Oskar Kokoschka, Anton Kolig and Carry Hauser. The catalog shows that Harta exhibited six works, two oils, two watercolors, a charcoal, and an etching. During this time, he painted many portraits, and was considered to be the leading portraitist of Salzburg society. He drew luminaries such as Wilhelm Furtwängler, Herbert von Karajan, and Clemens Holzmeister. In 1956 he painted President Dwight D. Eisenhower’s portrait, which was presented to Ike as a gift.

In December 1959, Harta’s wife, Elisabeth passes after a long illness. In the fall of 1960, he marries the Baroness Margarethe Daisy De Baillou, and they live together quietly in the Pfeiffergasse in Salzburg.

In a diary entry, in 1960, Harta philosophizes about his life:

"A strange time, a time of tension and fulfillment, of expectation and resignation, problems pile up wherever I look, and yet I stand Inwardly above them; perhaps lack of ambition is the reason I have already achieved so much in life and lost so much, so the feeling of joy is muted and I do not think much of happiness. The world in which I live is alien to me I miss any relationship with atoms, moon rockets, and whatever kind of mind agitates today. Man does not change, he has remained the same with all his faults and virtues."

— Felix A. Harta

Professor Harta died on November 27, 1967 at the age of 83. His paintings and graphic work continue to be exhibited posthumously, and many curators include at least one Harta work in retrospectives on Austrian Expressionism from 1908 to 1938. Two major museums, the Belvedere, Vienna, and the Salzburg Museum collaborated on a large groundbreaking exhibition that received international attention entitled: “Faistauer, Schiele, Harta & Co: Painting Unites Us” from July 12 to October 13, 2019 at the Salzburg Museum. This exhibit focused on several connecting themes between these three notable artists. This exhibition advanced and clarified Harta's role in the development of classical Austrian modernism.

== Awards ==
- Diplome d’ Honneur de I’ Exposition Internationale de Bordeaux, 1927
- Prize of the Austrian State, 1929
- Prize of Honour of the City of Vienna, 1934

== Selected museums where works reside ==
- Albertina Museum, Vienna
- Belvedere Museum, Vienna, Austria
- Museum Carolino-Augusteum, Salzburg, Austria
- Lentos Kunstmuseum, Linz, Austria
- Leopold Museum, Vienna
- Museum der Moderne, Salzburg, Austria
- Museum of Military History, Vienna
- Victoria and Albert Museum, London, England

== Selected works ==
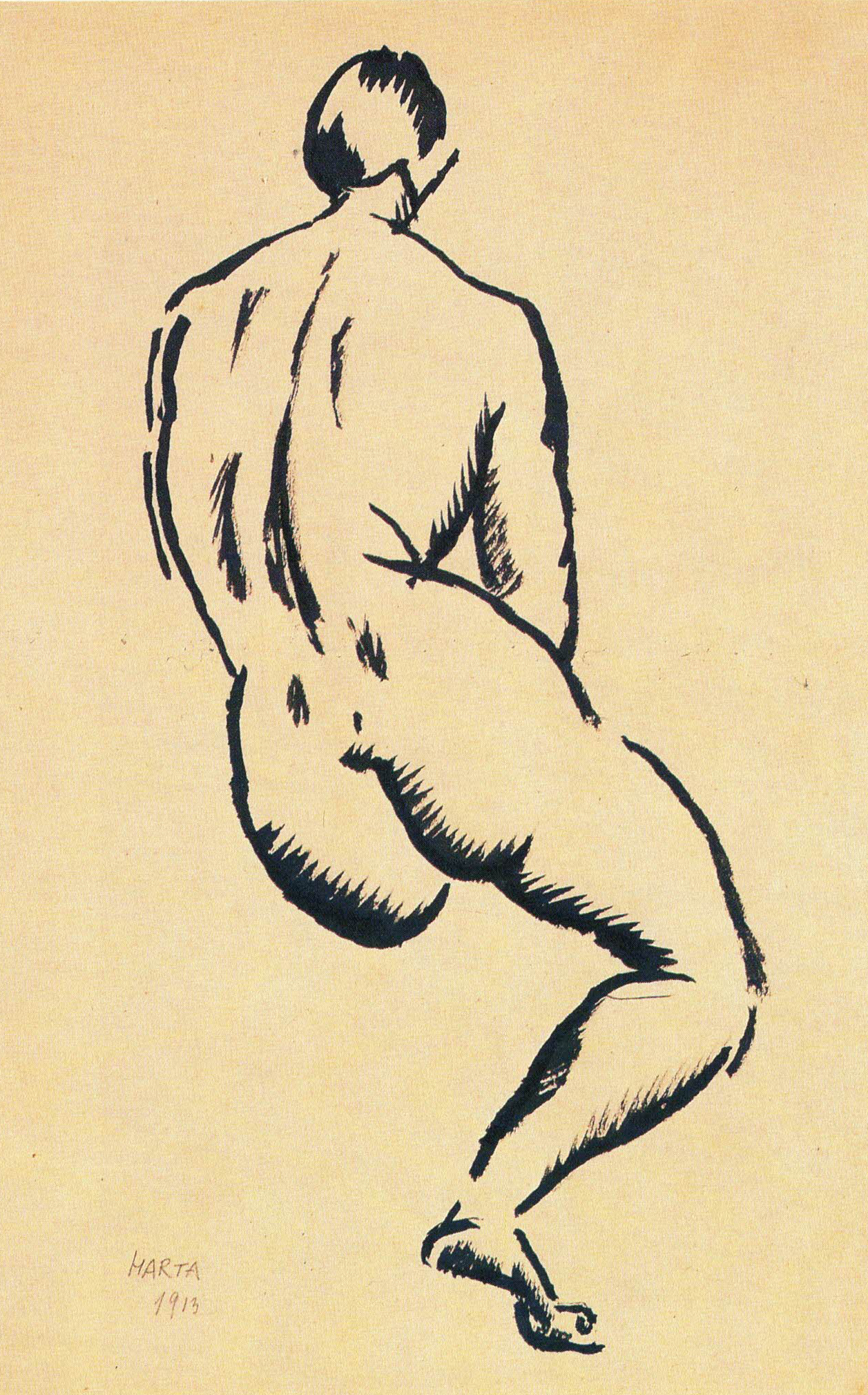
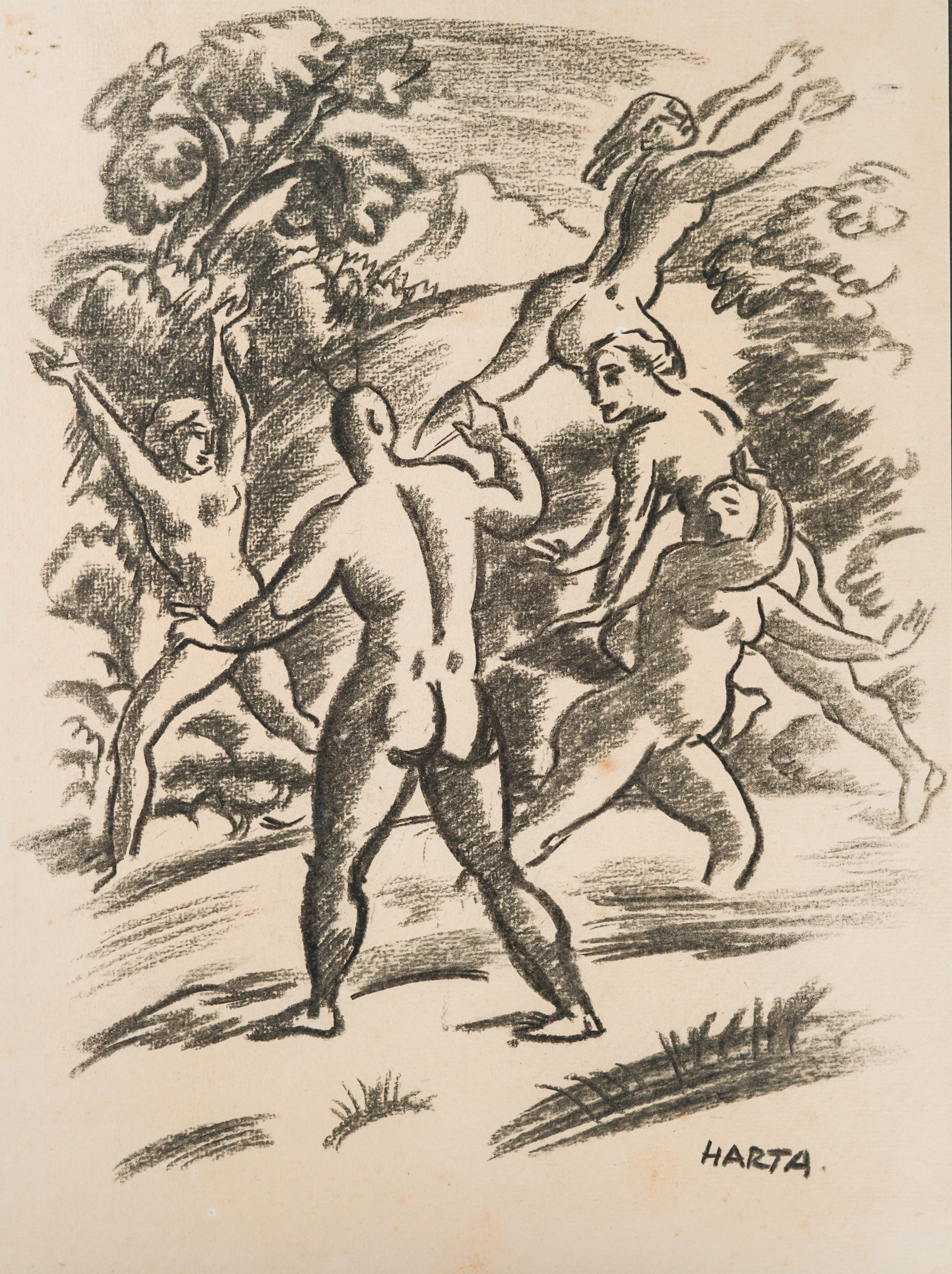
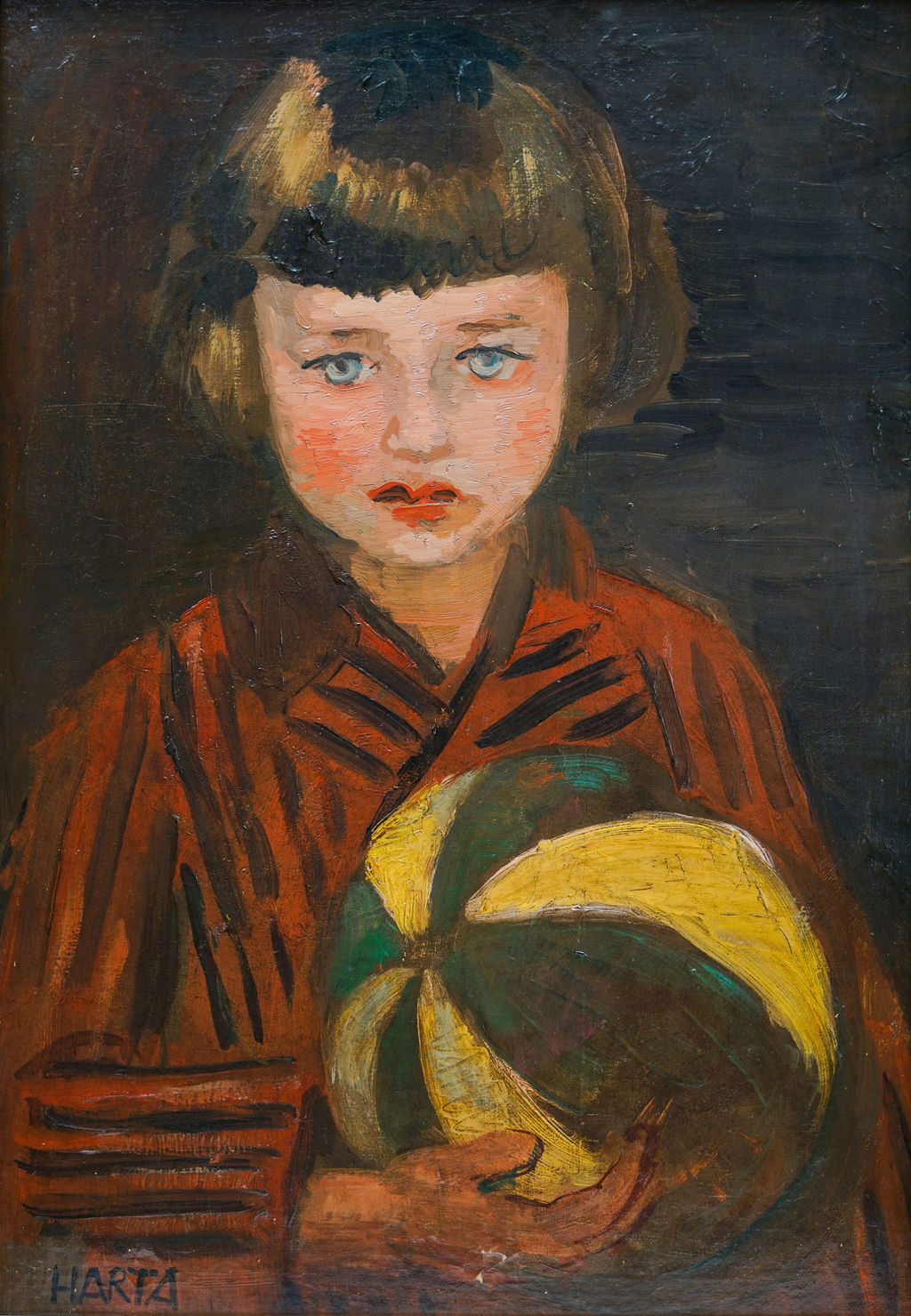
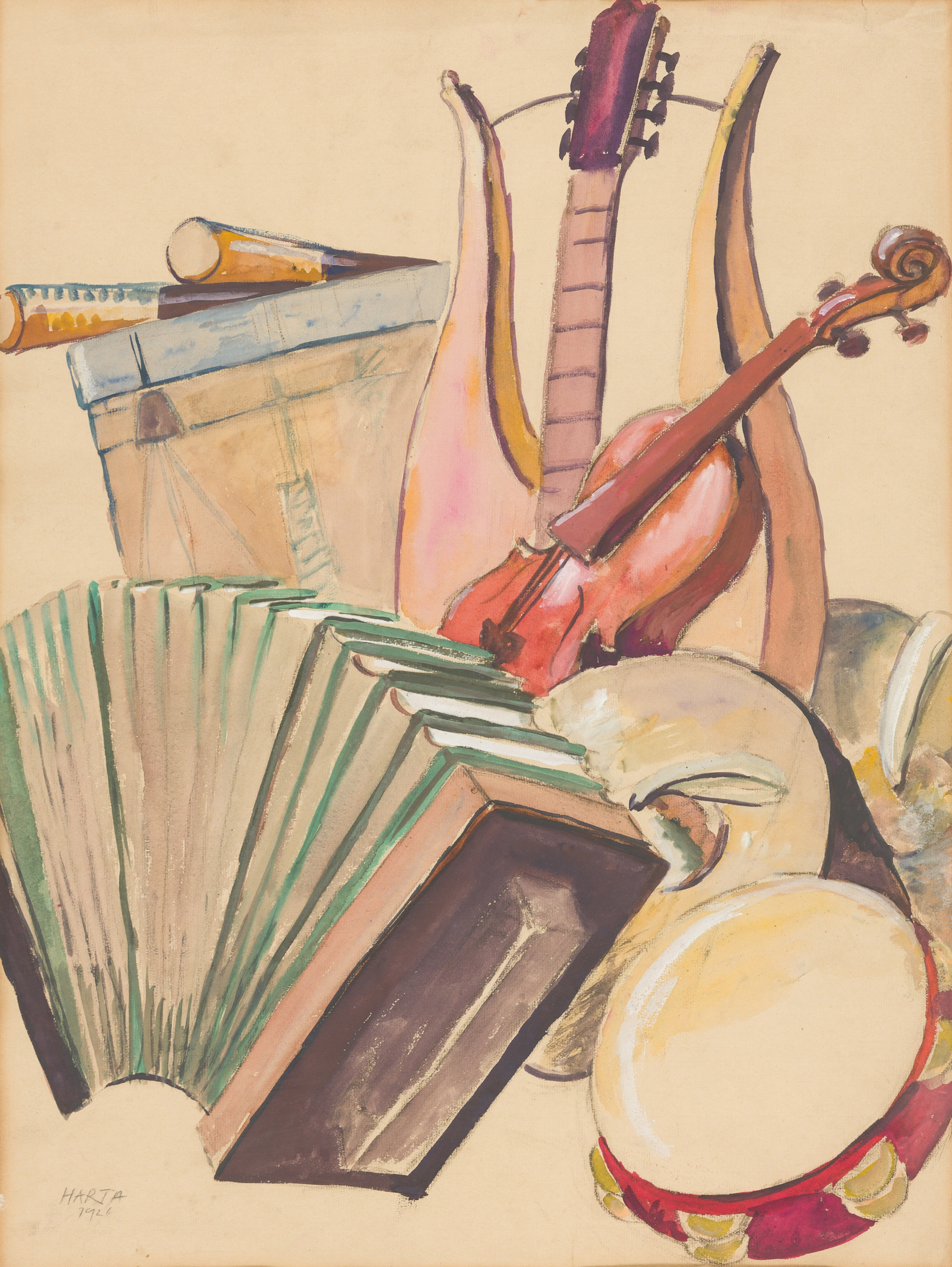
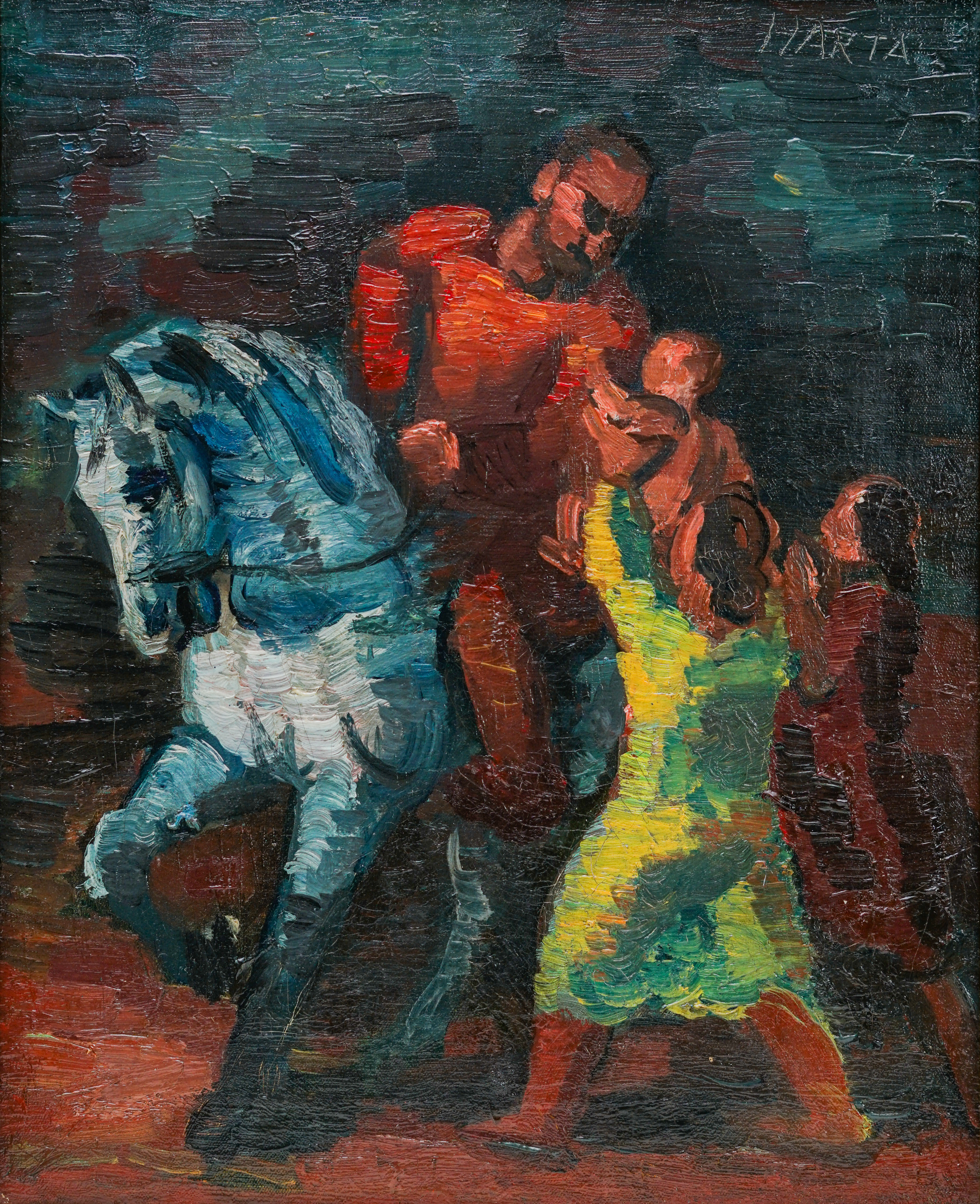
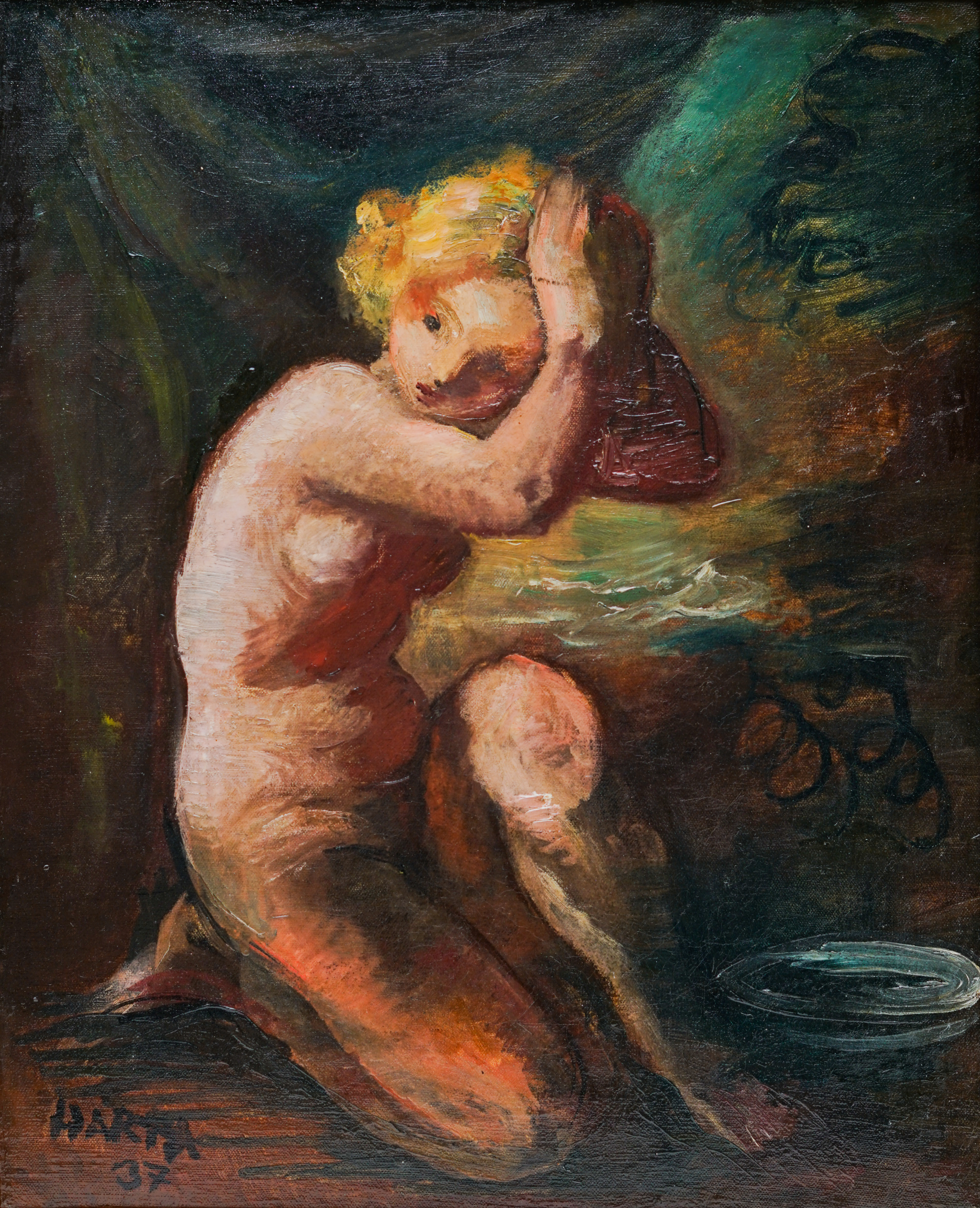
