= José Antonio Sánchez Baíllo =

Spanish painter and engraver (born 1953)

- Born: José Antonio Sánchez Baíllo; 24 October 1953 (age 72); Cartagena, Murcia, Spain
- Education: Doctor of Fine Arts of the University of Seville
- Known for: Painting, Engraving, Printmaking
- Movement: Figurative art

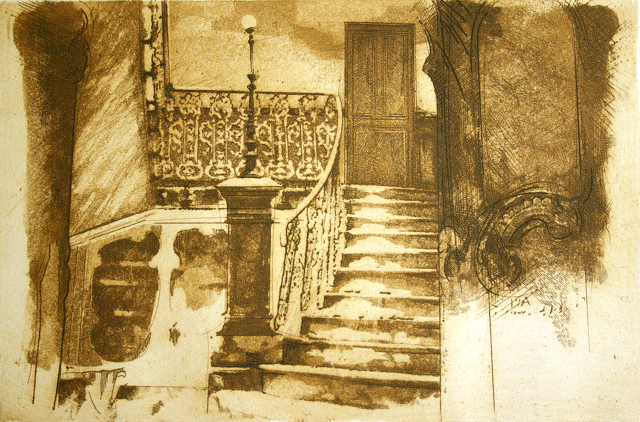
Engraving Portal Interior Medieras

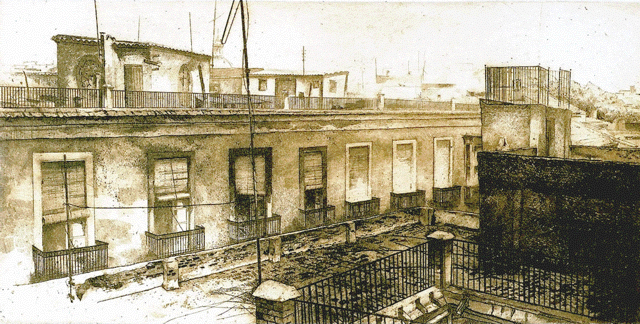
Engraving Azotea Cartagena

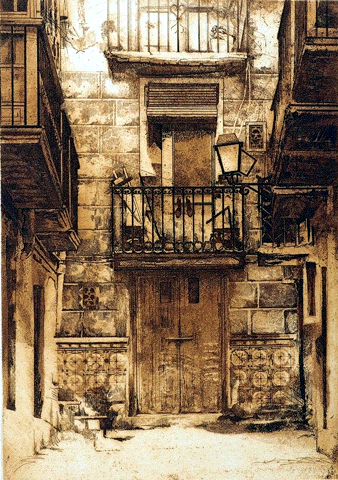
Engraving Callejón

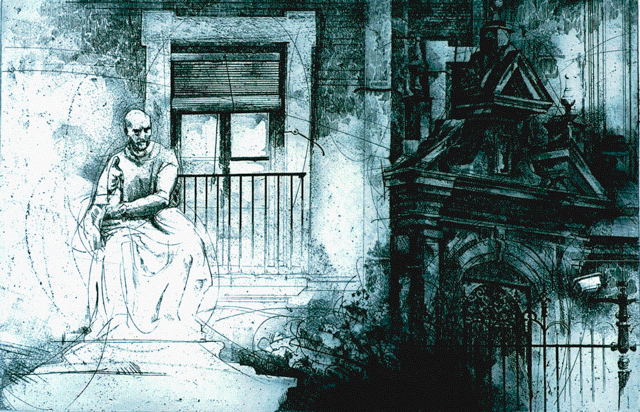
Engraving Plaza Salvador

José Antonio Sánchez Baillo (Cartagena, October 24, 1953) is a Spanish painter and engraver. He is one of the main figures of the intimist trend in new andalusian realism. He is one of the main experts in engraving and stamp techniques, uniting an absolute mastery of technical procedures with an excellent painting and engraving ability. For several decades now, he has been hired as specialist advisor for engraving projects. Moreover, he has a vast trajectory as guest speaker in conferences and seminars. He is a creator of an important web dedicated to the didactics of the Drawing, valued for the university education of the graphical expression.

== Career ==
He was born in Cartagena, Spain in 1953, he has lived in Seville since 1971, when he started his studies at School of Fine Arts Saint Isabel de Hungría. There he won the "Graduation Prize Winner" in 1976 and 1977, the first of the great number of prizes that have marked his career.

He taught in the Faculty of Fine Arts of the University of Seville since 1991.

As a Doctor of Fine Arts, he has always worked linked to the University of Seville as a professor of painting, engraving and drawing at the Faculty of Fine Arts, as a researcher of the group "Research on Graphic Design" at that same faculty, along with his work as a Higher Technician of Graphic Design at the Faculty of Fine Arts of Seville.

== Works ==
His work can be set within the Sevillian figurative movements, in painting and engraving alike. Extremely concerned about technique, his themes reflect on the urban space, still life and the landscape.

He is author, together with Antonio Agudo, of the diploma for the prize to PhD with distinction of the University of Seville, both having been chosen for the task as a sign of appreciation of their merits and importance in art.

He has edited over 150 engravings for public institutions such as Junta de Andalucía, Sevillana de Electricidad, Cartuja 93, the University of Seville, and many others. He has his own editions and participations in different Spanish Art Galleries.

== Prizes ==
- First Prize in the National Painting Contest 'City of Fuente Álamo' in 1979 with the work 'Recuerdo' and again in 1981 with 'Azoteas de Cartagena'
- Prize in the 'Vicente Ros' Painting Contest in Cartagena, 1979 with the work 'Fachada'
- First Prize in the National Painting Exhibition 'City of Murcia' in 1981 with the work 'Número 7'
