= Gerhard Weissenbacher =

Austrian painter and art historian

Gerhard Weissenbacher (born 1941 in Vienna) is an Austrian painter and art educator and the author of a two-volume Standardwerk on the architectural history of the Vienna district of Hietzing.

== Life ==
After graduating from the Bundesrealgymnasium Wien XV in 1961, Weissenbacher studied from 1961 until 1966 at the Academy of Fine Arts Vienna under the professors Josef Dobrowsky, Herbert Boeckl and Max Weiler; at the same time he studied art history and history at the University of Vienna. In 1966, he passed the teacher's examination for art education and history and obtained his diploma as an academic painter. From 1966 to 2001, Weissenbacher worked as an AHS teacher and spent an extended period in West Africa (Liberia). He also lived in Paris between 1978 and 1979. In 1982, Weissenbacher began his many years of research on the architectural development of Vienna's 13th district, which resulted in the publication of the two volumes In Hietzing gebaut. Geschichte und Architektur eines Wiener Gemeindebezirkes.

In 2002, he received the 1952 Decoration of Honour for Services to the Republic of Austria.

Artistic works by Weissenbacher are in the possession of the Albertina, the Federal Ministry of Education, Science and Culture, the Lower Austrian Government, the State Gallery of the Principality of Liechtenstein and private collections.
