= Austrian Association of Women Artists =

Arts organization in Austria

The Austrian Association of Women Artists (German: Vereinigung bildender Künstlerinnen Österreichs; VBKÖ) was founded in 1910. The VBKÖ is located at Maysedergasse 2/4, Vienna 1010, its founding headquarters. The association supports improvements to the economic and educational conditions of female artists, as well as promoting the artists themselves.

== Historical beginnings ==
Founded in 1910, VBKÖ's first president was Baronin Olga Brand-Krieghammer who oversaw the association's first six years. Broadly, the mission of VBKÖ was to make more female artists visible, though in order to achieve this, other economic, educational and health concerns required betterment as well. A program of exhibitions began from VBKÖ's inception, and these shows laid the foundations for future feminist discourse.

"As far as mode as well as completeness are concerned, a similar exhibition to this one had so far not been organized on the continent. The fundamental idea of this exhibition is: to give the public an overview about what women have been and are able to create in the fine arts, and to give new motivations to the artists".

— Introduction to the first catalogue of the first exhibition of the VBKÖ: "The Art of the Woman", held from November until December 1910, Print 1, Archive of the VBKÖ.

Käthe Kollwitz, Tina Blau, Marie Egner, Helene Funke and Olga Wisinger-Florian were all connected to the VBKÖ, some as active members, while others were invited to exhibit. VBKÖ rented its own studio and exhibition space, allowing artists to work outside of the established art world. The VBKÖ is one of many Euro-American organizations that support women artists and other examples include the Society of Female Artists London, founded in 1855; the Vereinigung der Berliner Künstlerinnen und Kunstfreunde, Berlin founded in 1867; the Société de l’Union des Femmes Peintres et Sculpteurs (Society of the Union of Women Painters and Sculptors), Paris, founded in 1881; and the National Association of Women Artists, United States, founded in 1889.

== take! make! activate! VBKÖ-Archiv ==
The take! make! activate! VBKÖ-Archiv contains significant material, files, and collections from 1910 to 2005. The archive, developed by the women artists, has grown since its creation. The inventory list of the archive (compiled by Sabine Harik, PhD) was released in 2006, expanded by the Findbuch zur Vereinigung bildender Künstlerinnen Österreichs (Ed.: VBKÖ, Rudolfine Lackner) as well as the DOWNLOAD, for the purpose of independent preparatory research. The archive is accessible by appointment.
